= 1997–98 South Pacific cyclone season =

Tropical cyclone season

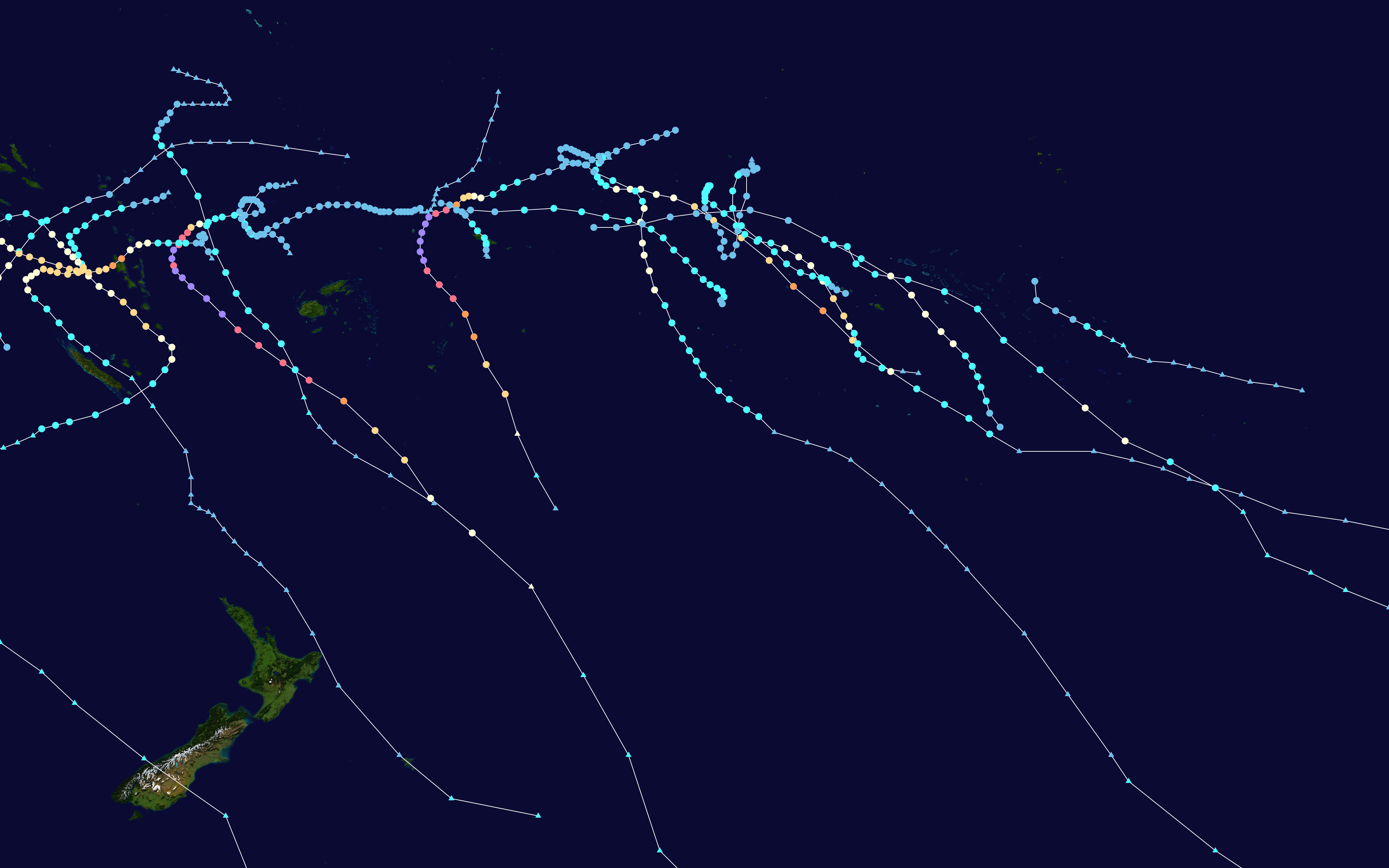
- Season summary map

Seasonal boundaries
- First system formed: October 8, 1997
- Last system dissipated: May 3, 1998

Strongest storm
- Name: Ron and Susan
  - Maximum winds: 230 km/h (145 mph) (10-minute sustained)
  - Lowest pressure: 900 hPa (mbar)

Seasonal statistics
- Total depressions: 20
- Tropical cyclones: 16 (record high)
- Severe tropical cyclones: 7
- Total fatalities: 50 total
- Total damage: > $7.6 million (1998 USD)

Related articles
- 1997–98 Australian region cyclone season; 1997–98 South-West Indian Ocean cyclone season

The 1997–98 South Pacific cyclone season was the most active South Pacific tropical cyclone season on record, with 16 tropical cyclones occurring within the South Pacific basin between 160°E and 120°W. The season started earlier than normal with 3 systems developing before the official start of the season on November 1, 1997, while the final system of the season dissipated on May 3, 1998, after the season had officially ended on April 30. During the season 50 people died as a result of tropical cyclones, with the deadliest being Cyclone Martin with 27 known deaths. The strongest tropical cyclones during the season were Cyclone Ron and Cyclone Susan as both were estimated to have minimum pressures of 900 hectopascals (26.6 inHg), and were the most intense tropical cyclones on record in the South Pacific Ocean until Cyclone Zoe in 2002–03. After the season ended, 11 names had their names either removed or retired from the lists of names, after they caused significant impacts to South Pacific islands.

During the season, tropical cyclones were officially monitored by the Fiji Meteorological Service (FMS), New Zealand Met Service and the Australian Bureau of Meteorology. The United States Armed Forces through the Joint Typhoon Warning Center (JTWC) and Naval Pacific Meteorology and Oceanography Center (NPMOC), also monitored the basin and issued warnings for American interests. During the season the FMS issued warnings and assigned names to any tropical cyclones that developed between the Equator and 25°S while MetService issued warnings for any that were located to the south of 25°S. The JTWC issued warnings for American interests on any significant tropical cyclone that was located between 160°E and the 180° while the NPMOC issued warnings for tropical cyclones forming between 180° and the American coast. The FMS and MetService estimated sustained wind speeds over a 10-minute and used the Australian tropical cyclone intensity scale, while the JTWC and the NPMOC estimated sustained wind speeds over a 1-minute period which are compared to the Saffir-Simpson Hurricane Scale (SSHS).

== Seasonal outlooks ==
Record	Tropical Cyclone	Severe Tropical Cyclone	Ref
Average activity: (1969–70 – 1996–97)	7 – 8	4
Record high activity:	1982–83: 14	1982–83:10
Record low activity	1994–95: 3	1994–95: 0
Activity during this season:	16	7

Ahead of the season officially starting on November 1, the Governor of American Samoa reported that traditionalists were forecasting a hurricane to affect American Samoa during the season after the big breadfruit and mango harvest that the island nation had experienced. The Cook Islands Meteorological Service and National Disasters Committee warned islanders that they could expect the "worst cyclone season in years" and urged residents to prepare. On November 27, New Zealand's National Institute of Water and Atmospheric Research (NIWA) issued a press release, which predicted that because of the strong El Niño phenomenon, there would be more tropical cyclones than average. In particular, they predicted that due to the strong El Niño, countries within the western part of the basin were likely to see fewer tropical cyclones during the season than countries within the eastern part of the basin. The Southern Cook Islands, Tonga, Tuvalu and French Polynesia were predicted to have an increased risk, while Fiji was forecast to have an average risk of being affected by a tropical cyclone. NIWA also reported that Cyclone Martin's impact on the Northern Cook Islands was an early sign of what could be expected during the season, because the system had occurred further east than normal. In mid-December, the Cook Islands Meteorological Service director commented to the media that from now on, by the time cyclones reached Rarotonga, they would have lost their intensity, while a spokesperson for NIWA commented that holidaymakers heading for the Pacific had little chance of running into a cyclone as the damaging core of the cyclone was expected to be over the ocean, while some cyclones were expected to be relatively weak. It was also noted that collectively the Pacific Islands Meteorological Services were collectively bracing for up to 15 tropical cyclones during the season, compared to 12 during an average season.

== Seasonal summary ==
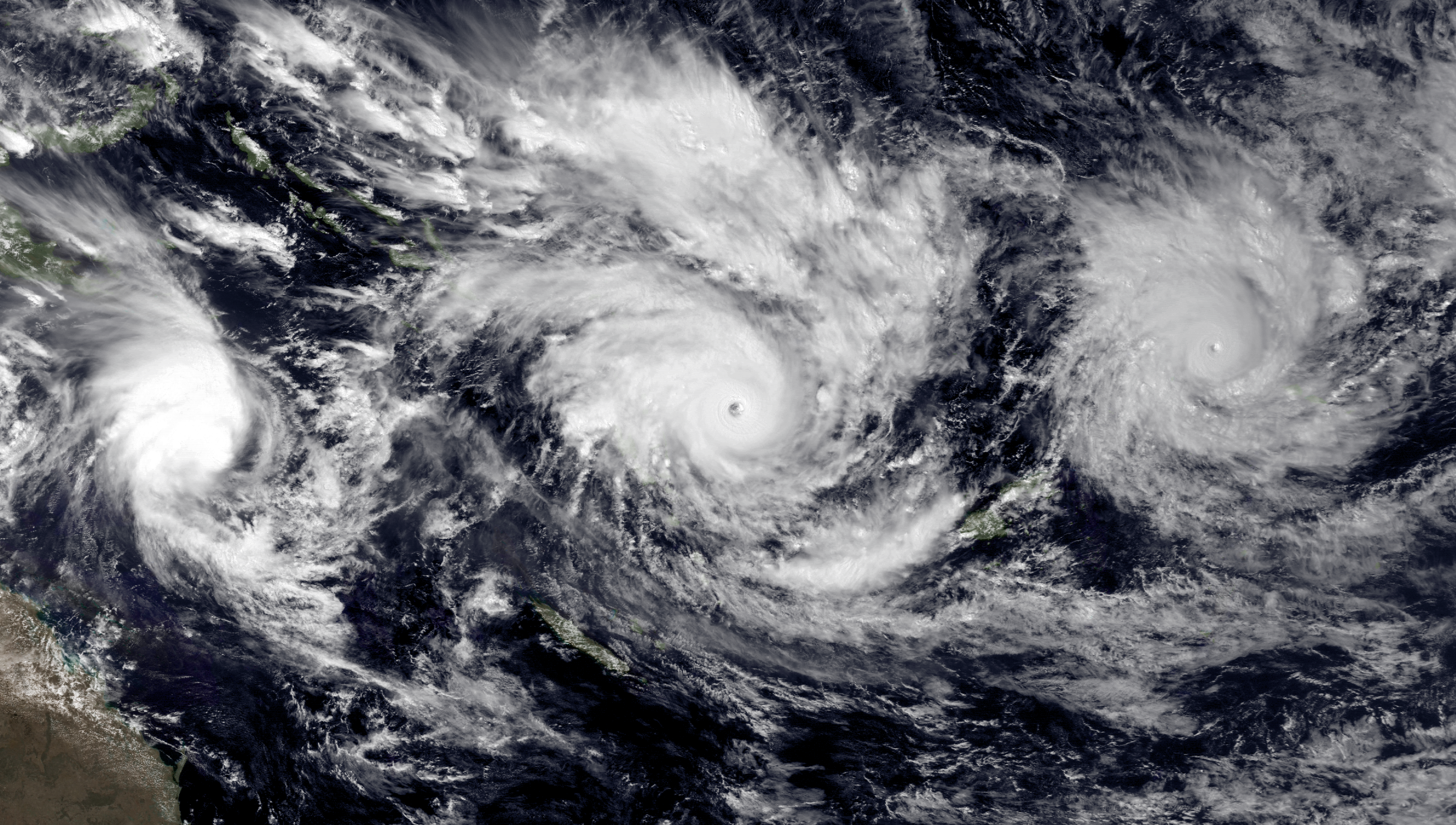
Three simultaneous cyclones on January 5: Katrina (left), Susan (center) and Ron (right)

The 1997–98 season was one of the most active and longest South Pacific tropical cyclone seasons on record, with 16 tropical cyclones occurring within the South Pacific basin between 160°E and 120°W. The season was characterized by a very strong El Niño event, which caused the South Pacific Convergence Zone to move from its usual position near the Solomon Islands to the Northern Cook Islands. As a result, ten tropical cyclones formed to the east of the International Dateline, with seven of these tropical cyclones going on to affect French Polynesia.

After the 1996–97 season had one of the latest ends to a season on record, the 1997–98 season started early, with three tropical systems observed before the start of the season on November 1, 1997. Two other tropical systems, including the precursor tropical disturbance to Severe Tropical Cyclone Martin developed, before the official start of the season on November 1, 1997. Severe Tropical Cyclone Martin impacted the Cook Islands and French Polynesia, where it caused significant damage and 28 deaths during the opening days of the season. Tropical Cyclone Nute was named on November 18, before it moved out of the basin as a Category 2 tropical cyclone during November 19. During the rest of November, several tropical disturbances developed along the South Pacific Convergence Zone, including the precursor system to Severe Tropical Cyclone Osea and Tropical Cyclone Pam.

Severe Tropical Cyclones Ron and Susan were both the strongest tropical cyclones of the season and were thought to be the strongest tropical cyclones in the region since Severe Tropical Cyclone Hina of the 1984–85 season.

After the final warnings on Cyclone Tui were issued a weak circulation remained in the vicinity of Samoa for several days, before a westerly surge from the monsoon resulted in a tropical cyclone developing during February 1. However, due to uncertainties in the continuation of Tui after several other weak low-pressure areas had formed, the FMS decided to treat the cyclone as a separate system and named it Wes.

Tropical Cyclone Bart developed during the final days of the season and caused ten deaths and minor damage to French Polynesia, before it dissipated during May 3.

After the season had ended the names Alan, Katrina, Martin, Nute, Osea, Ron, Susan, Tui, Ursula, Veli, Yali and Zuman were either retired or removed from the list of names for the region, while the names Lusi, Pam and Bart were reused during the 2013–14, 2014–15 and 2016–17 seasons.

== Systems ==
=== Tropical Cyclone Lusi ===
- Category 2 tropical cyclone (Australian scale)
- Tropical storm (SSHWS)
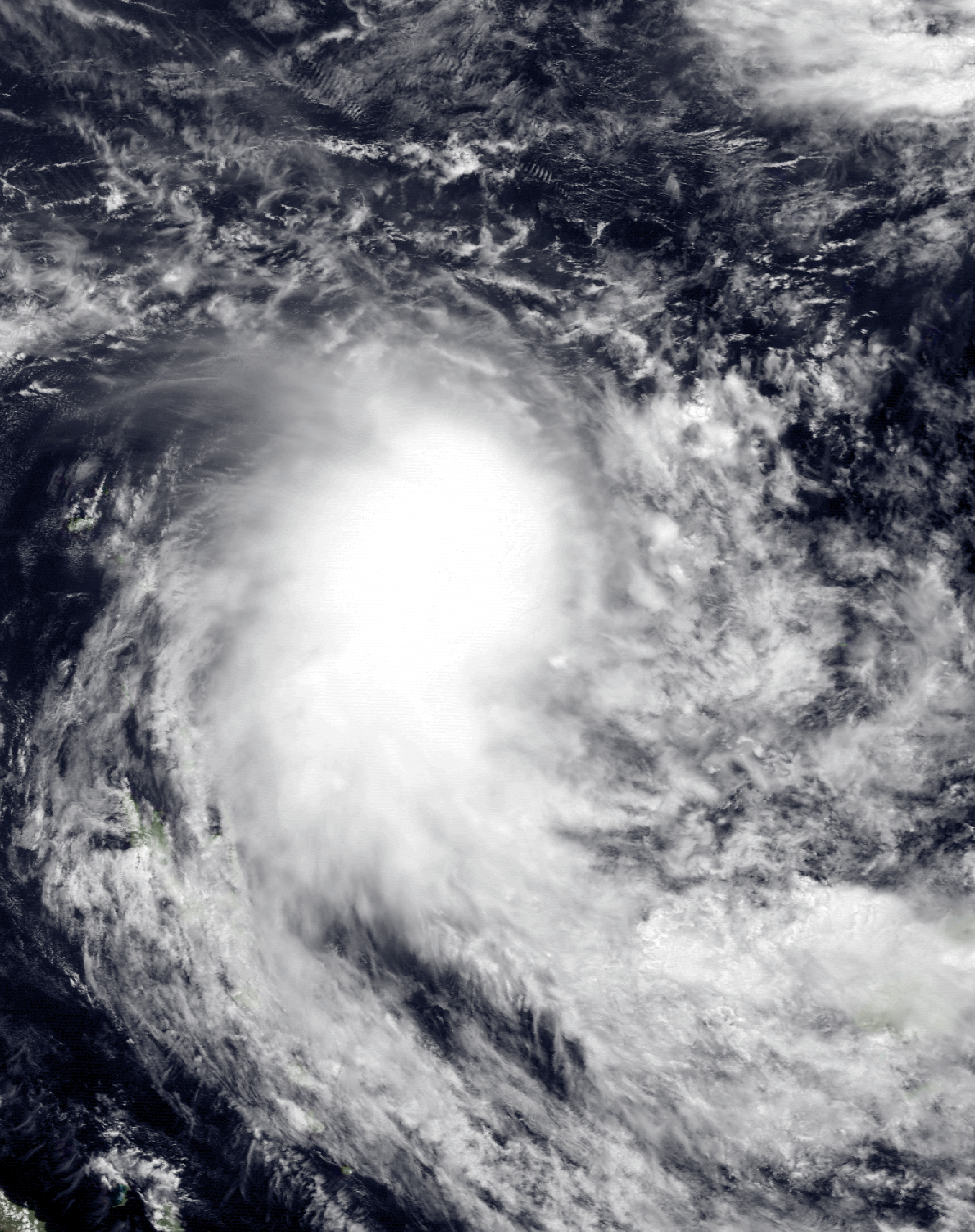
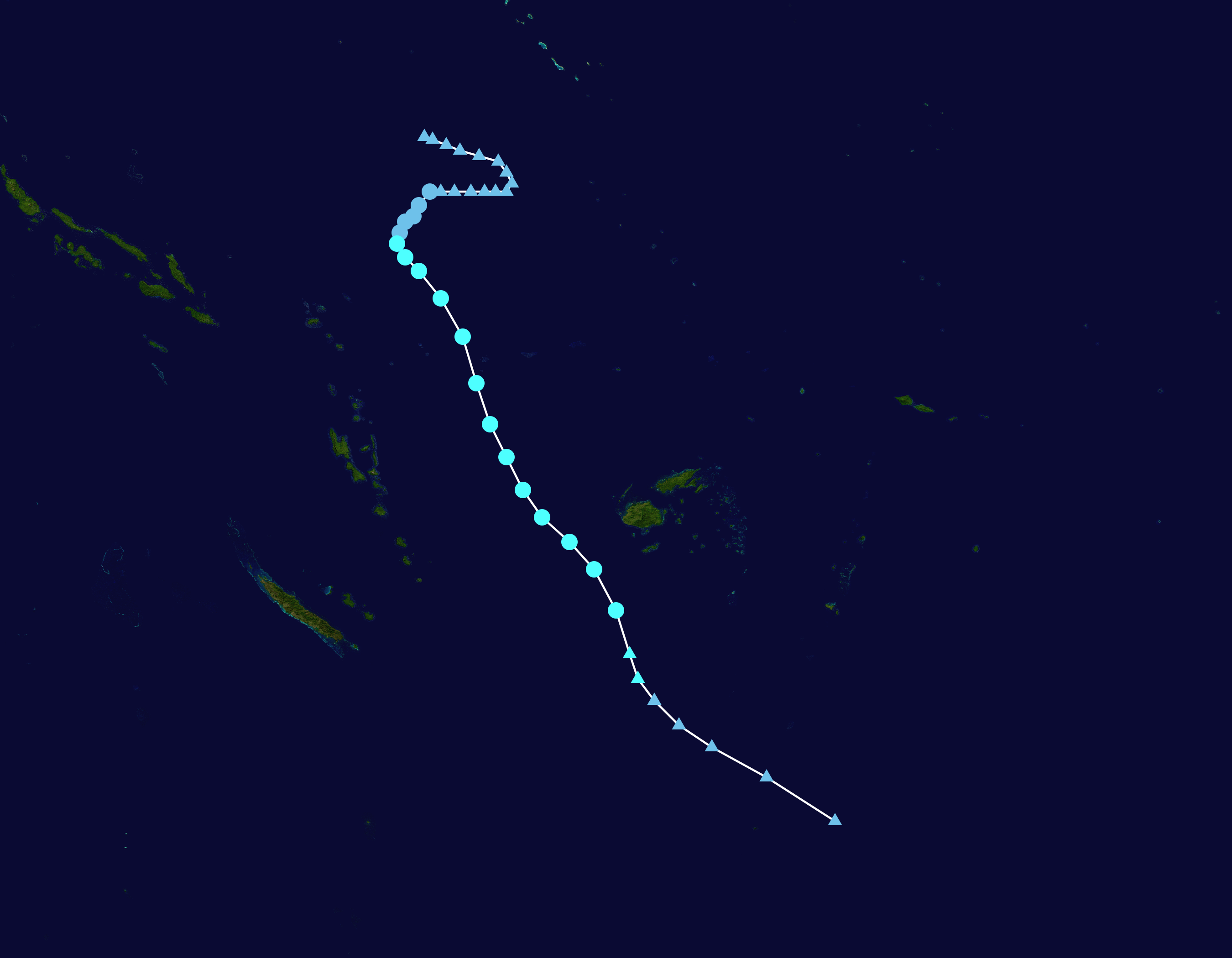
- Duration: October 8 – October 12
- Peak intensity: 100 km/h (65 mph) (10-min); 980 hPa (mbar)

On October 4, a cyclonic circulation became evident within an area of convection, that was located about 500 km (310 mi) to the southeast of Yaren in Nauru. Over the next few days the system moved southwards, towards the upper subtropical ridge while outflow gradually developed further. During October 8, the system was classified as a tropical depression as the system rapidly developed further, before the JTWC initiated advisories on the depression and designated it as Tropical Cyclone 02P. The FMS subsequently named the depression Lusi during the next day, as the system had intensified into the earliest tropical cyclone since 1970, while located about 1020 km (635 mi) to the northwest of Port Vila, Vanuatu. Over the next few days, Lusi moved towards the south-southeast, taking a so-called "gentleman's track" between Vanuatu and Fiji.

During October 10, the JTWC reported that Lusi had peaked with 1-minute sustained wind speeds of 110 km/h (70 mph), while the system was located about 570 km (355 mi) to the northwest of Port Vila, Vanuatu. The FMS subsequently followed suit during the next day and estimated peak 10-minute sustained wind speeds of 100 km/h (65 mph) which made it a category 2 tropical cyclone. After it had peaked in intensity Lusi started to weaken in an area of cooler sea surface temperatures, while vertical wind shear increased because of a mid-level trough and strong north-westerlies. During October 12, Lusi degenerated into an extratropical cyclone, before the remnants were last noted to the northeast of New Zealand. There was no impact caused by Lusi on any island, however, widespread heavy rainfall and gale-force winds were reported on several Fijian Islands.

=== Tropical Depression 03P ===
- Tropical depression (Australian scale)
- Tropical storm (SSHWS)
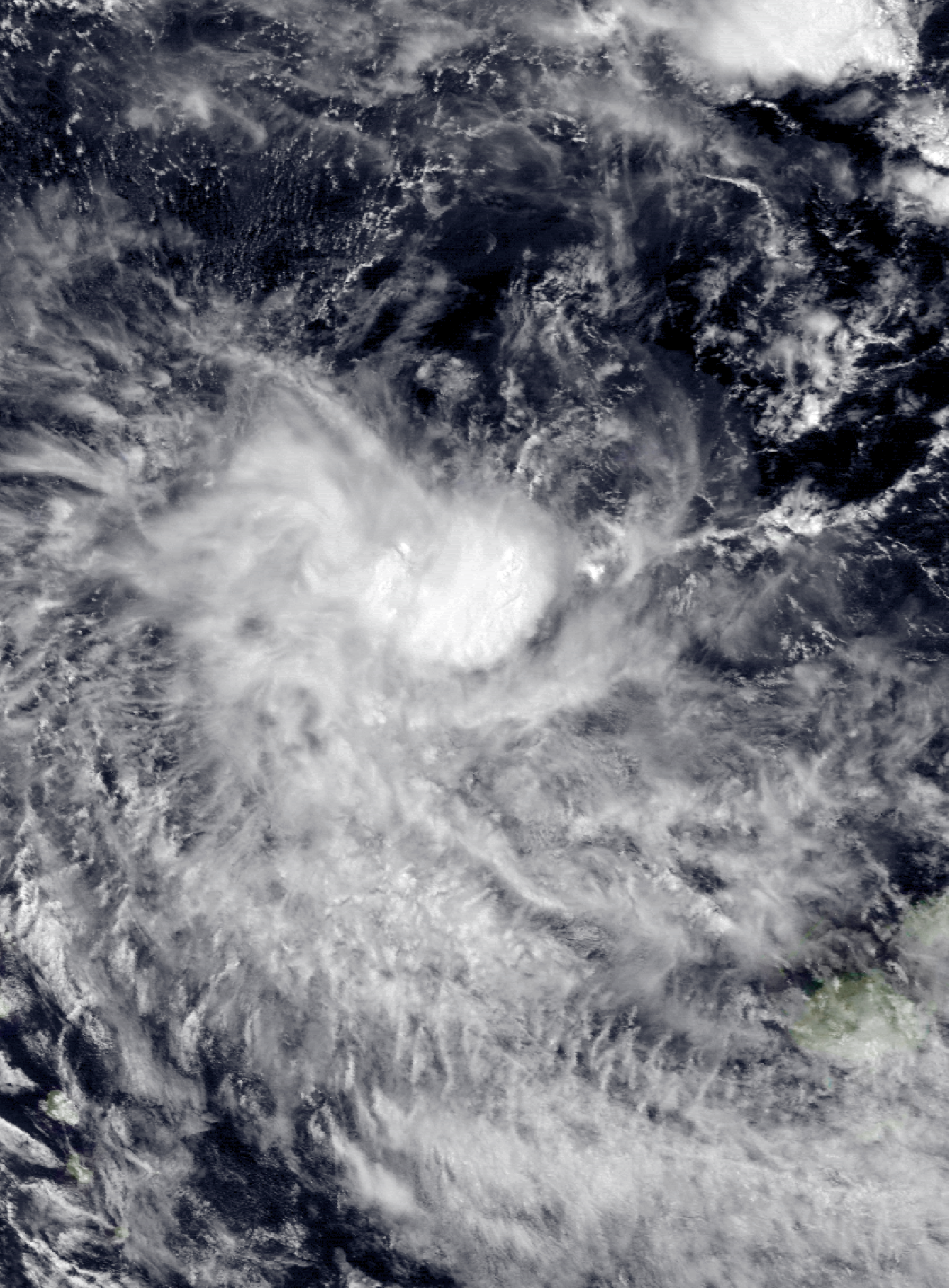
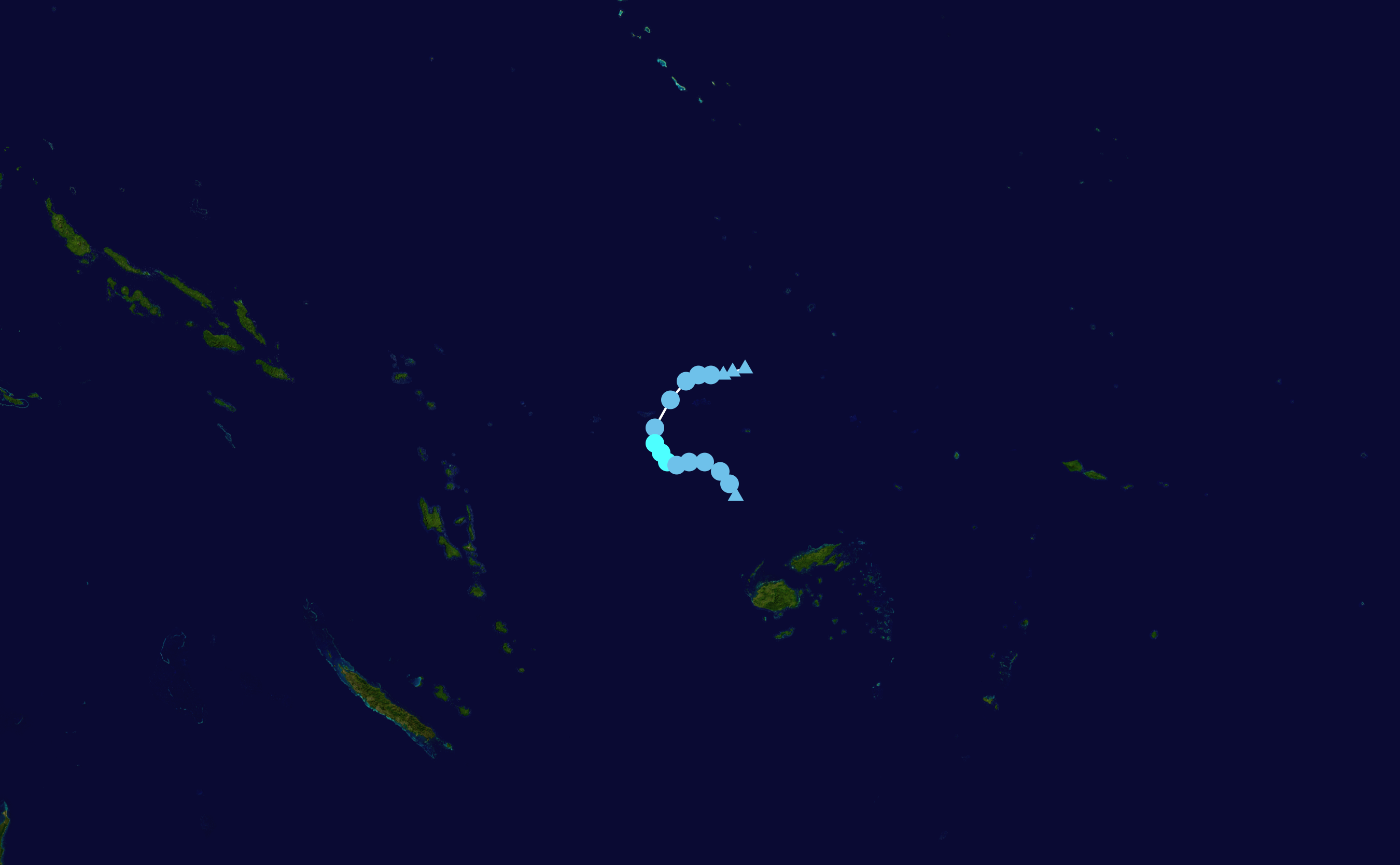
- Duration: October 26 – October 28
- Peak intensity: 65 km/h (40 mph) (1-min); 997 hPa (mbar)

On October 26, the FMS reported that a tropical depression had developed about 295 km (185 mi) to the west of the Fijian dependency of Rotuma. During that day, as the system moved south-westwards a central dense overcast became apparent in satellite imagery, before the JTWC initiated advisories and designated the system as Tropical Cyclone 03P. Within their first advisory, the JTWC noted that atmospheric convection associated with the system had fluctuated considerably over the last few days and that moderate to strong upper-level winds was creating significant vertical windshear over the system. As a result, they estimated that the system had peaked with 1-minute sustained winds of 65 km/h (40 mph), despite estimates of 85 km/h (50 mph) being reached via the Dvorak Technique. Over the next day, the systems original low level circulation center slowly weakened and became indistinguishable from the surrounding atmospheric convection, before a new center developed to the northeast of the old centre. Deep convection had developed around this new centre, however, the convection did not persist as the system was located in a region of strong vertical windshear, before the depression dissipated to the northwest of Fiji during October 28.

=== Severe Tropical Cyclone Martin ===
- Category 3 severe tropical cyclone (Australian scale)
- Category 3 tropical cyclone (SSHWS)
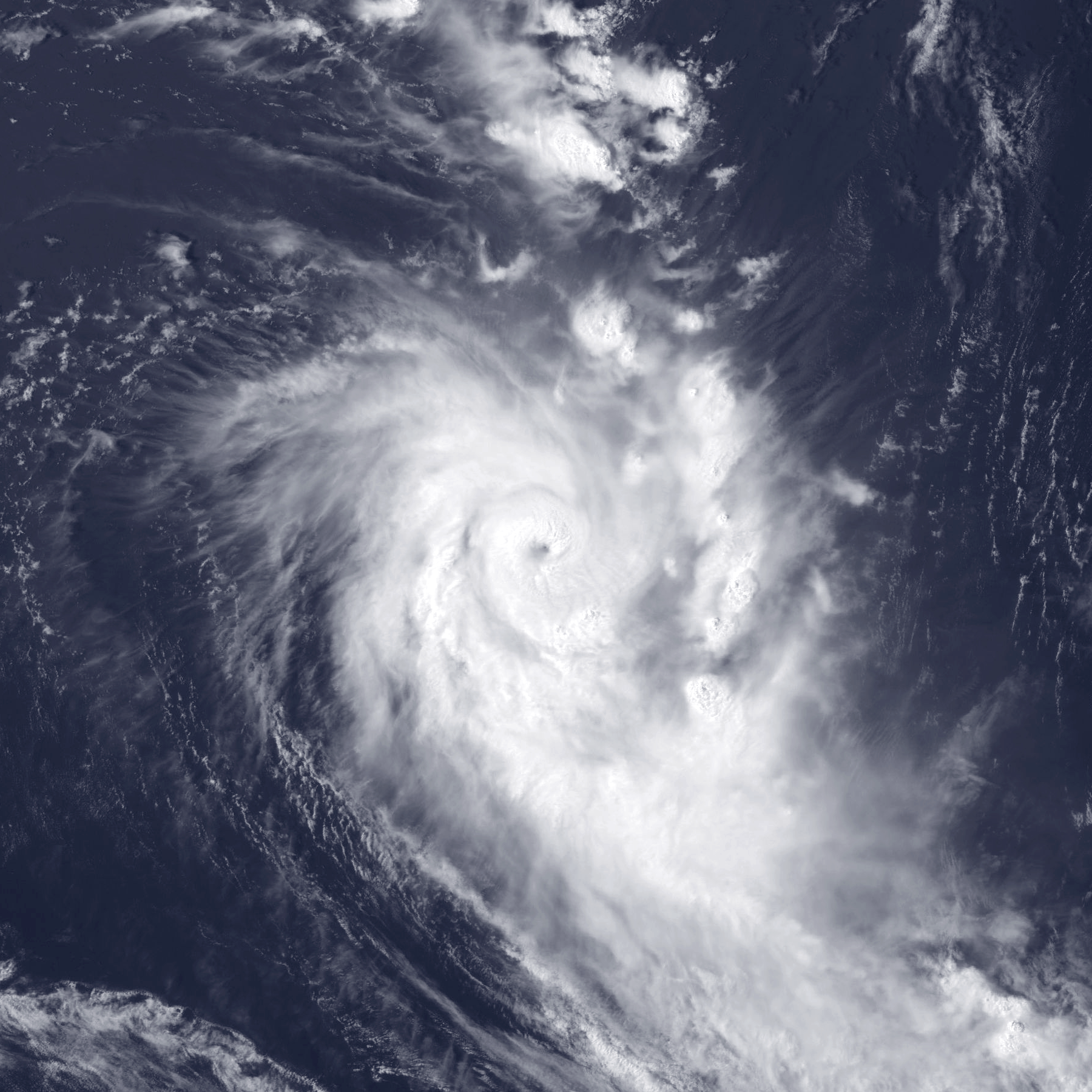
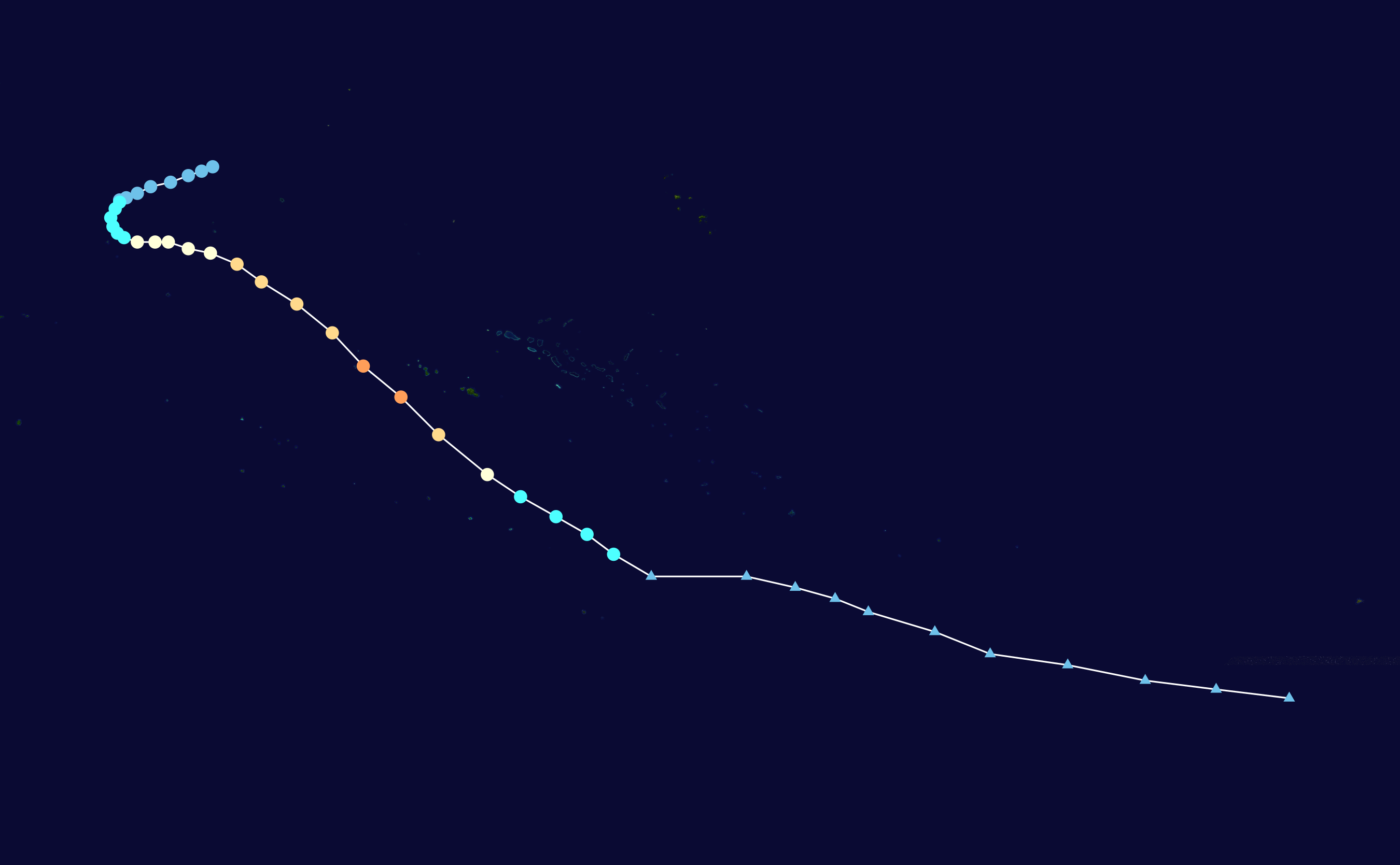
- Duration: October 27 – November 5
- Peak intensity: 155 km/h (100 mph) (10-min); 945 hPa (mbar)

On October 27, the FMS started to monitor a weak tropical disturbance that had developed to the north of the Northern Cook Islands. Over the next few days atmospheric convection surrounding the system remained disorganised, as the system moved to the southwest and was affected by strong upper-level north-easterly winds and moderate to strong vertical wind shear. Late on October 30, the NPMOC designated the disturbance as Tropical Cyclone 04P, after it had developed into a tropical depression. During the next day the system started to show a marked improvement in organisation and began rapidly developing, before the FMS named it Martin at 1500 UTC after it had developed into a category 1 tropical cyclone. When it was named, Martin was located about 500 km (310 mi) to the west of Manihiki Atoll in the Northern Cook Islands and had started to re-curve and move towards the south-east during that day. Early on November 1, the FMS reported that the system had become a category 2 tropical cyclone on the Australian scale, before the NPMOC reported that Martin had become equivalent to a category 1 hurricane on the SSHWS.

During November 2, the system continued to intensify as it moved towards the southeast and became equivalent to a category 2 hurricane on the SSHWS, as it moved towards the French Polynesian Society Islands of Bellingshausen, Mopelia and Scilly. During the next day, Martin passed near the Society Islands as it developed an 17 km (10 mi) eye, before the FMS reported at 06:00 UTC that the system had peaked as a category 3 severe tropical cyclone with 10-minute sustained wind speeds of 155 km/h (100 mph). The NPMOC also reported at around that time that Martin had peaked with 1-minute sustained windspeeds of 185 km/h (115 mph), which made it equivalent to a category 3 hurricane on the SSHWS. After peaking in intensity Martin started to weaken, as it interacted with a frontal system and started to accelerate towards the south-southeast. During November 4, Martin passed within 250 km (155 mi) of Tahiti as it became a category 2 tropical cyclone and started to transition into an extratropical cyclone. Later that day, the NPMOC issued their final advisory on Martin as it had become vertically sheared, with its surface center dislocated about 110 km (70 mi) from its upper level center. During November 5, the system weakened below tropical cyclone intensity as it moved into Met Services's area of responsibility, before it was last noted on November 8.

=== Tropical Cyclone Nute ===
- Category 2 tropical cyclone (Australian scale)
- Category 1 tropical cyclone (SSHWS)
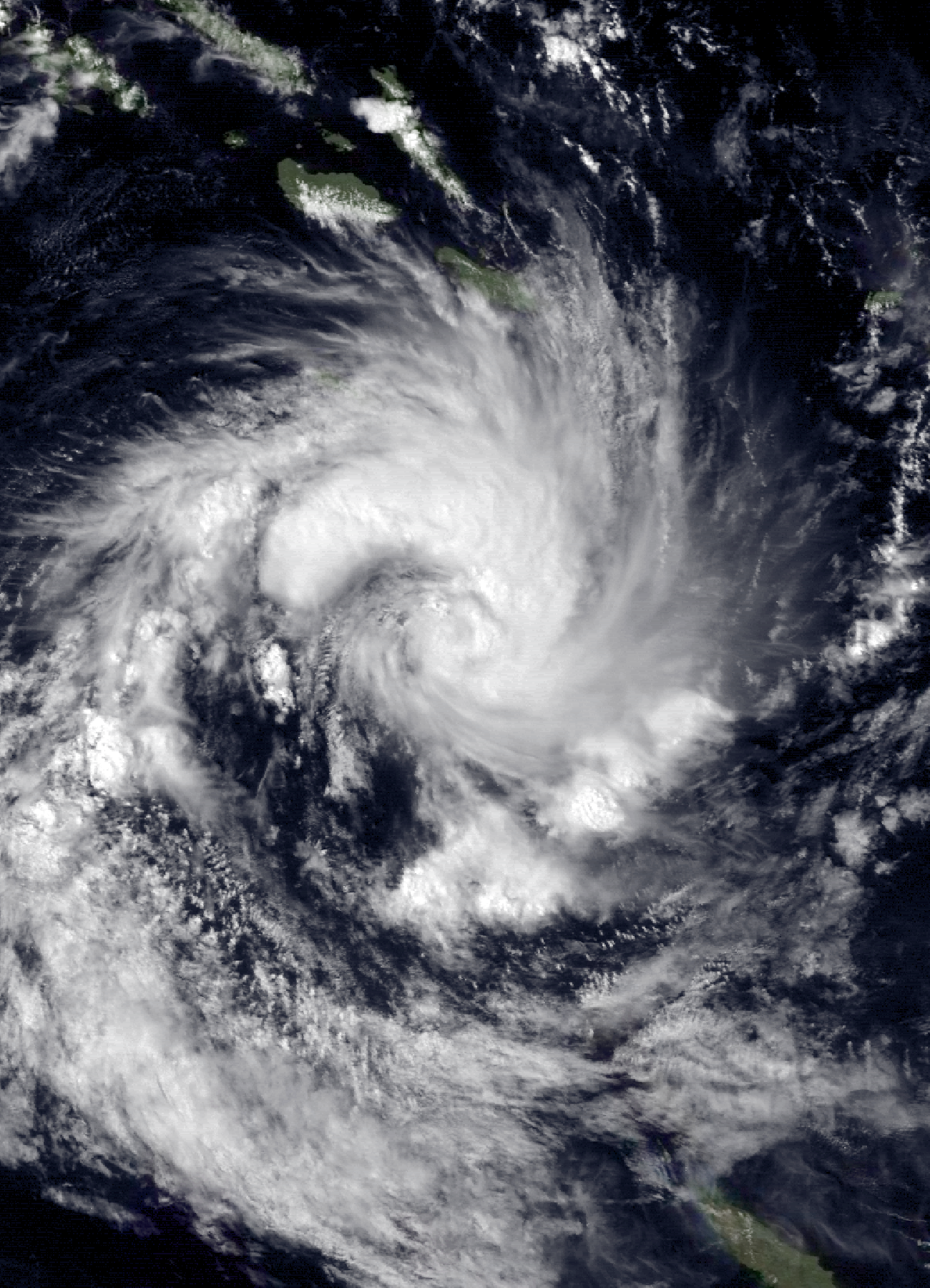
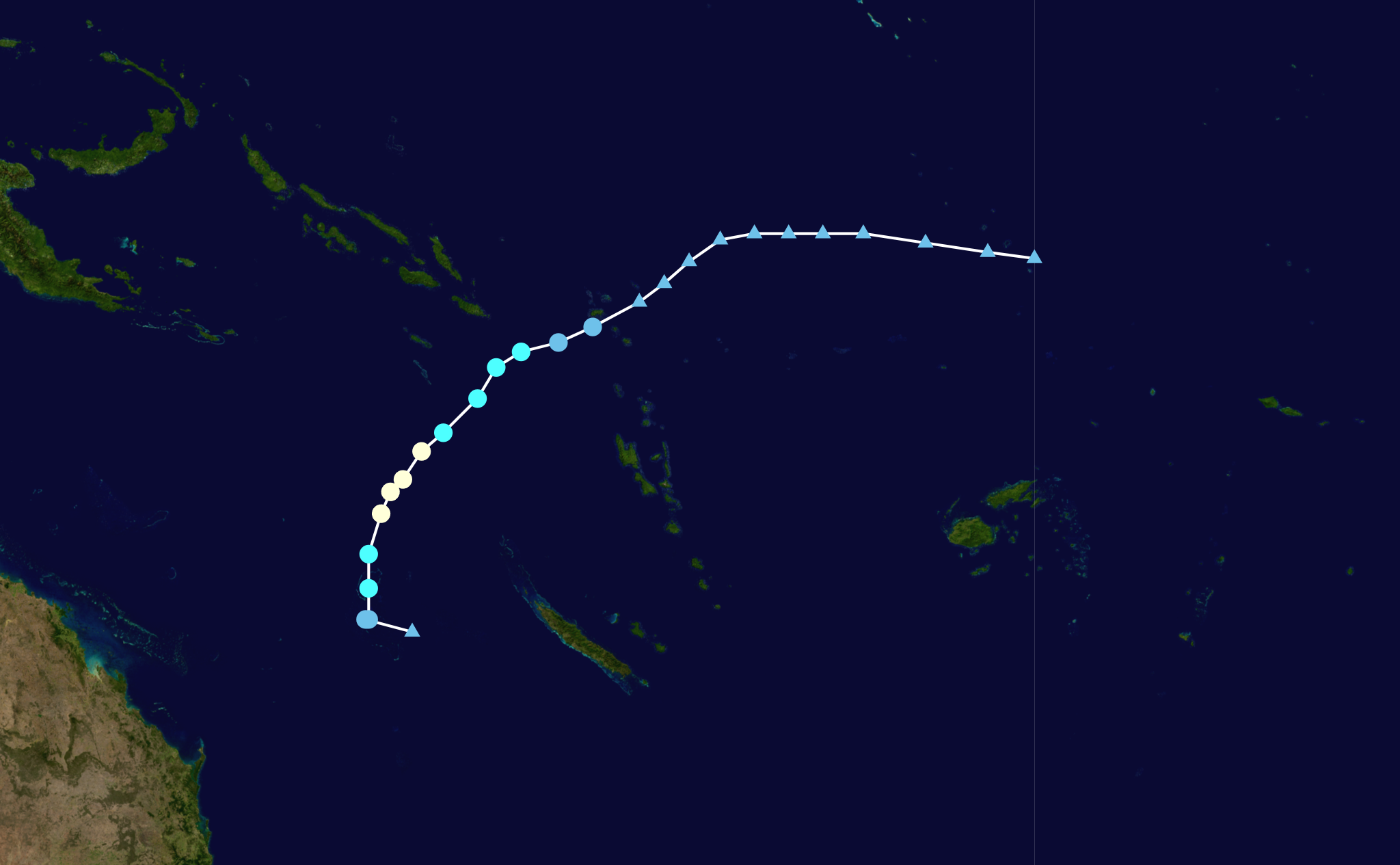
- Duration: November 18 – November 19 (Exited basin)
- Peak intensity: 110 km/h (70 mph) (10-min); 975 hPa (mbar)

On November 18, the FMS reported that a tropical depression had developed within the South Pacific Convergence Zone, about 100 km (60 mi) to the south-southwest of the Santa Cruz Islands in the Solomon Islands. During that day, the depression was steered south-westwards by the subtropical ridge of high pressure and encountered an area of increasing upper-level divergence and favourable sea surface temperatures. Later that day at around 09:00 UTC, the JTWC initiated advisories on the system and designated it as Tropical Cyclone 05P, after satellite imagery showed that the depression had a well defined low-level circulation and atmospheric convection had become better organized. This was followed 3 hours later by the FMS who reported that the system had developed into a Category 1 tropical cyclone and named it Nute, while it was located about 835 km (520 mi) to the north-west of Port Vila in Vanuatu. Over the next day, the newly named system continued to intensify and developed an eye feature, before the FMS reported that Nute had peaked as a Category 2 tropical cyclone with 10-minute sustained wind speeds of 110 km/h (70 mph) at around 0600 UTC on November 19. Later that day, the JTWC estimated that the system had peaked with 1-minute sustained winds of 130 km/h (80 mph), which made it equivalent to a Category 1 hurricane on the SSHWS. At around the same time, the FMS passed the primary warning responsibility for Nute to the BoM, after it had moved into the Australian region, where it dissipated to the west of New Caledonia on November 21, after encountering dry air and increased vertical wind shear.

=== Severe Tropical Cyclone Osea ===
- Category 3 severe tropical cyclone (Australian scale)
- Category 2 tropical cyclone (SSHWS)
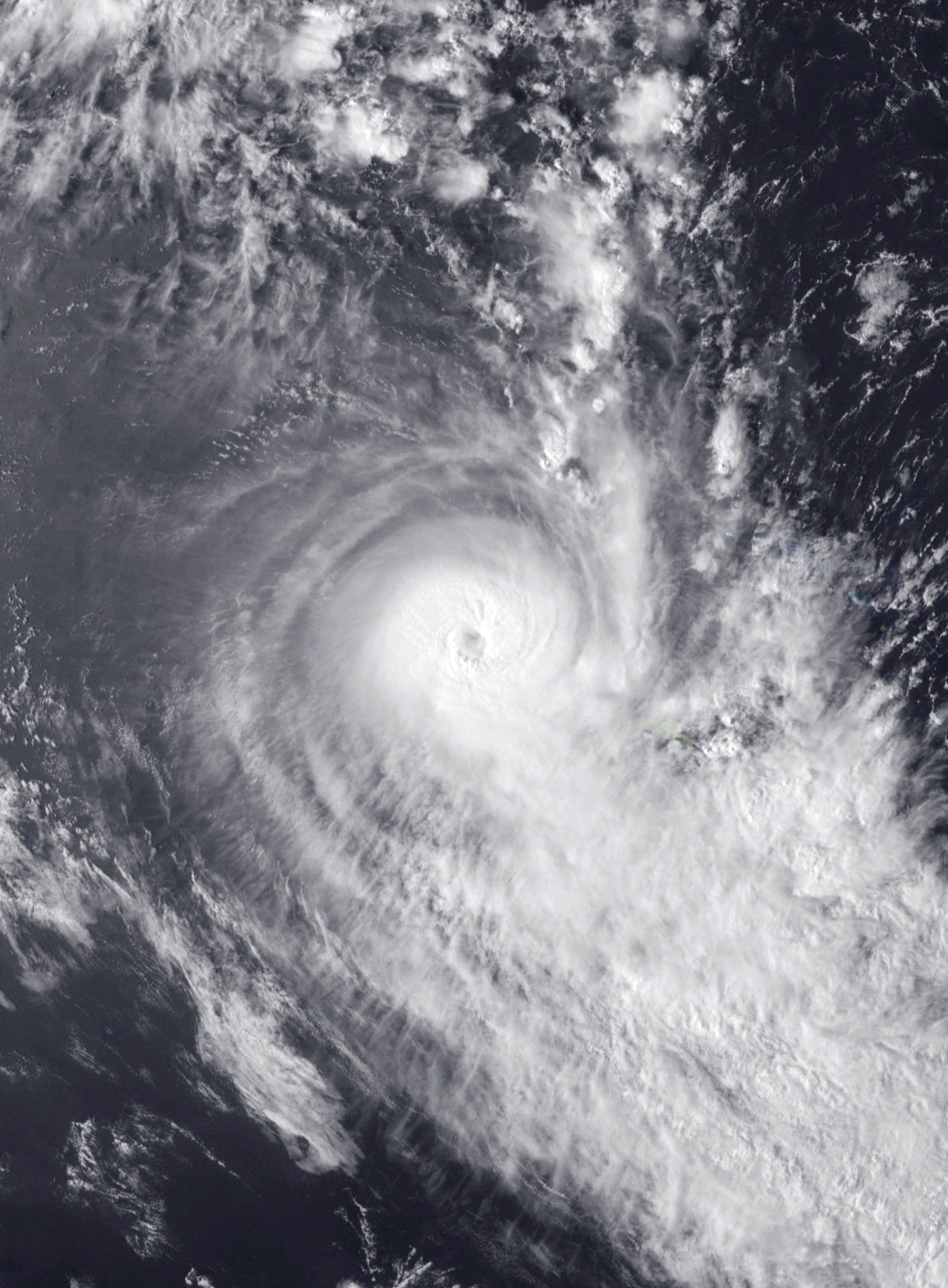
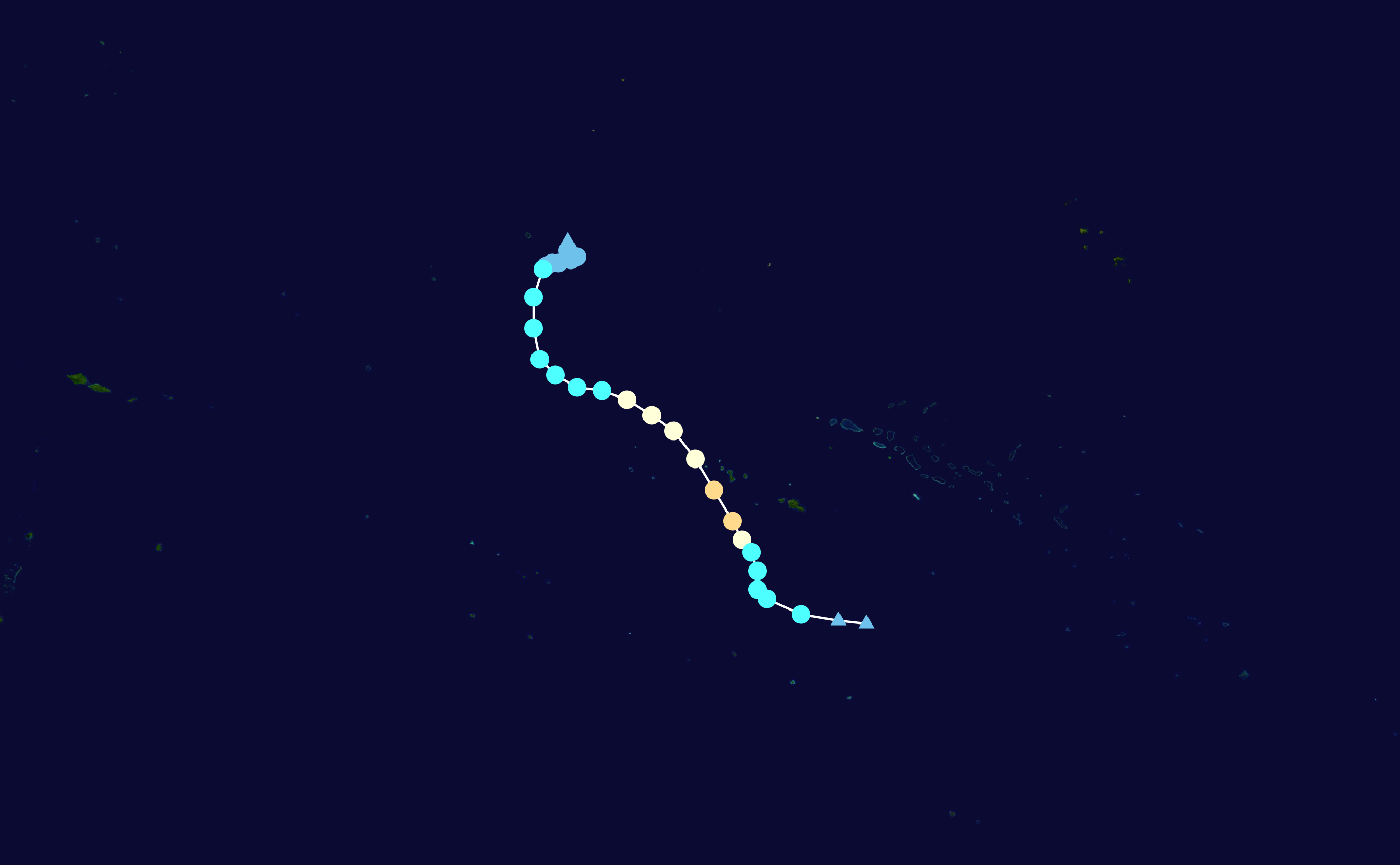
- Duration: November 22 – November 28
- Peak intensity: 150 km/h (90 mph) (10-min); 950 hPa (mbar)

On November 22, the FMS started to monitor a tropical depression that had developed about 465 km (290 mi) to the northeast of Manihiki Island. Over the next two days, the depression gradually developed further. At 1200 UTC on November 23, the NPMOC reported that the depression had become equivalent to a tropical storm and assigned it the designation 06P, before 12 hours later the FMS named the system Osea, as it had developed into a category 1 tropical cyclone. After developing into a tropical cyclone, Osea started moving towards the southeast. During November 26, both agency's reported that the system had reached its peak intensity, with the FMS reporting 10-minute sustained windspeeds of 150 km/h (90 mph), while the NPMOC reported peak 1-minute sustained windspeeds of 165 km/h (105 mph). After it had peaked, Osea started to gradually weaken, before during November 27 the NPMOC issued their final warning on the system as it had become sheared. The FMS monitored Osea for another 24 hours, before the system degenerated into a depression during November 28.

While it was active, Osea caused no deaths but was quite destructive to some of the northwestern Society Islands, with over 700 homes destroyed or severely damaged on Maupiti, Bora-Bora, and Raiatea. On Maupiti, an island with a population of 1100, about 95% of the infrastructure was destroyed. The town hall, two schools, and an airfield were destroyed. The town hall was evacuated due to the strong winds. In addition, 77 homes on the island were destroyed. Due to flooding, many highways were blocked. On Bora-Bora, an island which had a population of 4,500 at the time, roughly 30% of the infrastructure was destroyed, including 309 houses. On the north side of Bora Bora, nearly everything was destroyed, including the village of Vaitape. In Vaitape, roads were blocked and telecommunication lines were hampered. Seven people on the island were injured. Overall, 700 homes were at least somewhat destroyed by Osea. Throughout French Polynesia, banana trees were knocked down due to the strong winds.

=== Tropical Cyclone Pam ===
- Category 2 tropical cyclone (Australian scale)
- Category 1 tropical cyclone (SSHWS)
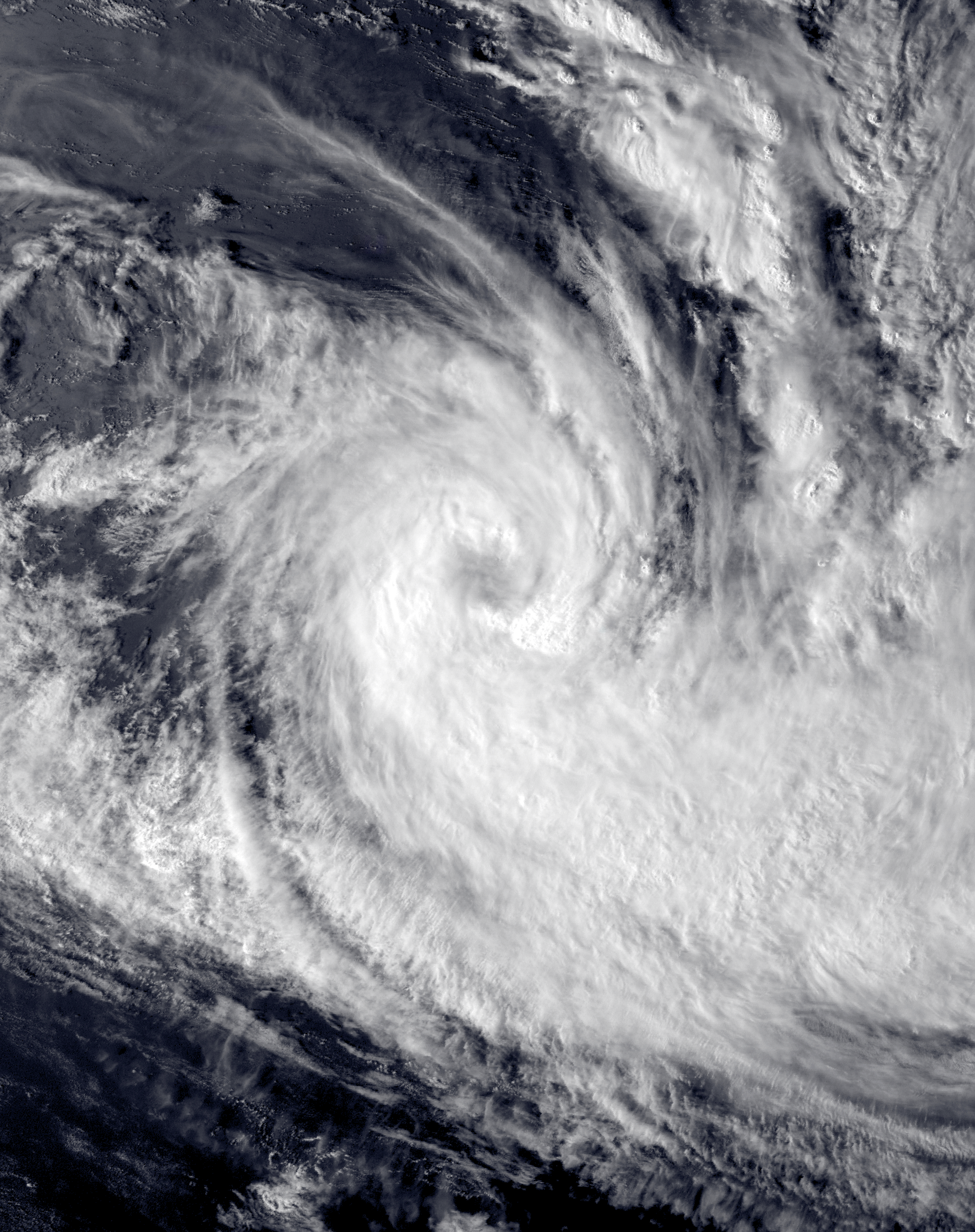
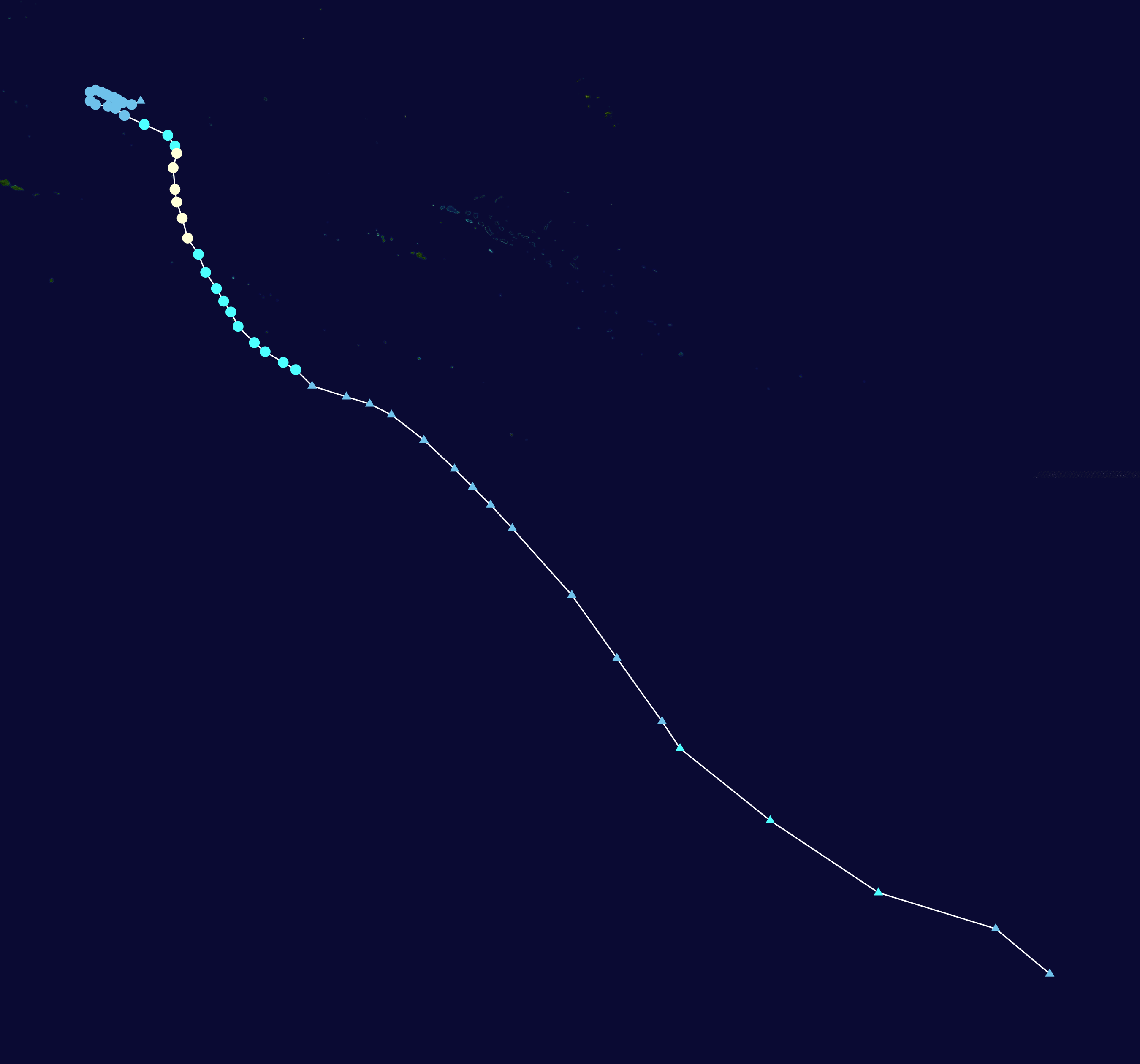
- Duration: December 6 – December 10
- Peak intensity: 110 km/h (70 mph) (10-min); 975 hPa (mbar)

At the end of November, an equatorial westerly wind burst occurred about 2000 km (1245 mi) south-west of Hawaii. This wind burst led to the development of two tropical cyclones to the east of the International Date Line on either side of the equator. On December 5, both the FMS and the NPMOC started to monitor the system as a tropical depression, while it was located between the Samoan and Northern Cook Islands. During the day, the system slowly developed and organized further while moving toward the south-east. Early on December 6, the FMS reported that the system had developed into a Category 1 tropical cyclone and named it Pam. After it was named, the system continued to slowly drift towards the south-southeast, before it started to move quicker later that day as it passed near the Cook Island of Suwarrow. As the system passed near Suwarrow, the NPMOC reported that Pam had reached its peak intensity with 1-minute sustained wind speeds of 120 km/h (75 mph), which made it equivalent to a Category 1 hurricane on the SSHWS.

Over the next couple of days, the system moved southwards before the FMS reported during December 8, that Pam had peaked as a Category 3 severe tropical cyclone with 10-minute sustained wind-speeds of 120 km/h (75 mph). However, during the systems post analysis, the FMS reduced these winds slightly to 110 km/h (70 mph) which made Pam a category 2 tropical cyclone, rather than a category 3 severe tropical cyclone on the Australian scale. During December 8, the system passed about 140 km (85 mi) to the east of Palmerston Island, before it passed about 75 km (45 mi) to the southwest of Rarotonga early the next day. During December 9, Pam started to rapidly weaken as it transitioned into an extratropical cyclone, while the FMS reported during the next day that the system had degenerated into a depression. Over the next few days the system continued to move southeastwards, before it was last noted during December 14, while located to the west of Chile.

=== Severe Tropical Cyclone Susan ===
- Category 5 severe tropical cyclone (Australian scale)
- Category 5 tropical cyclone (SSHWS)
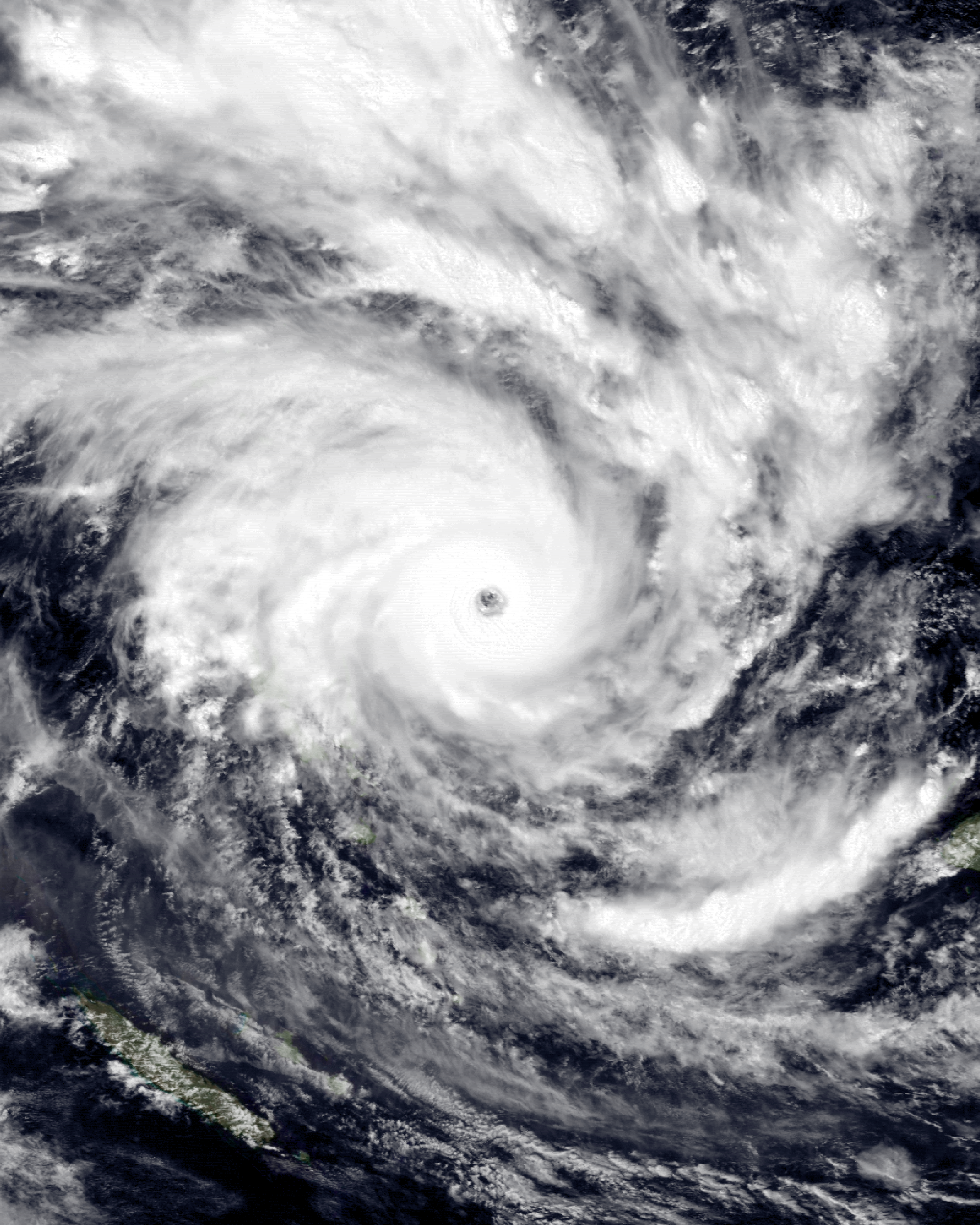
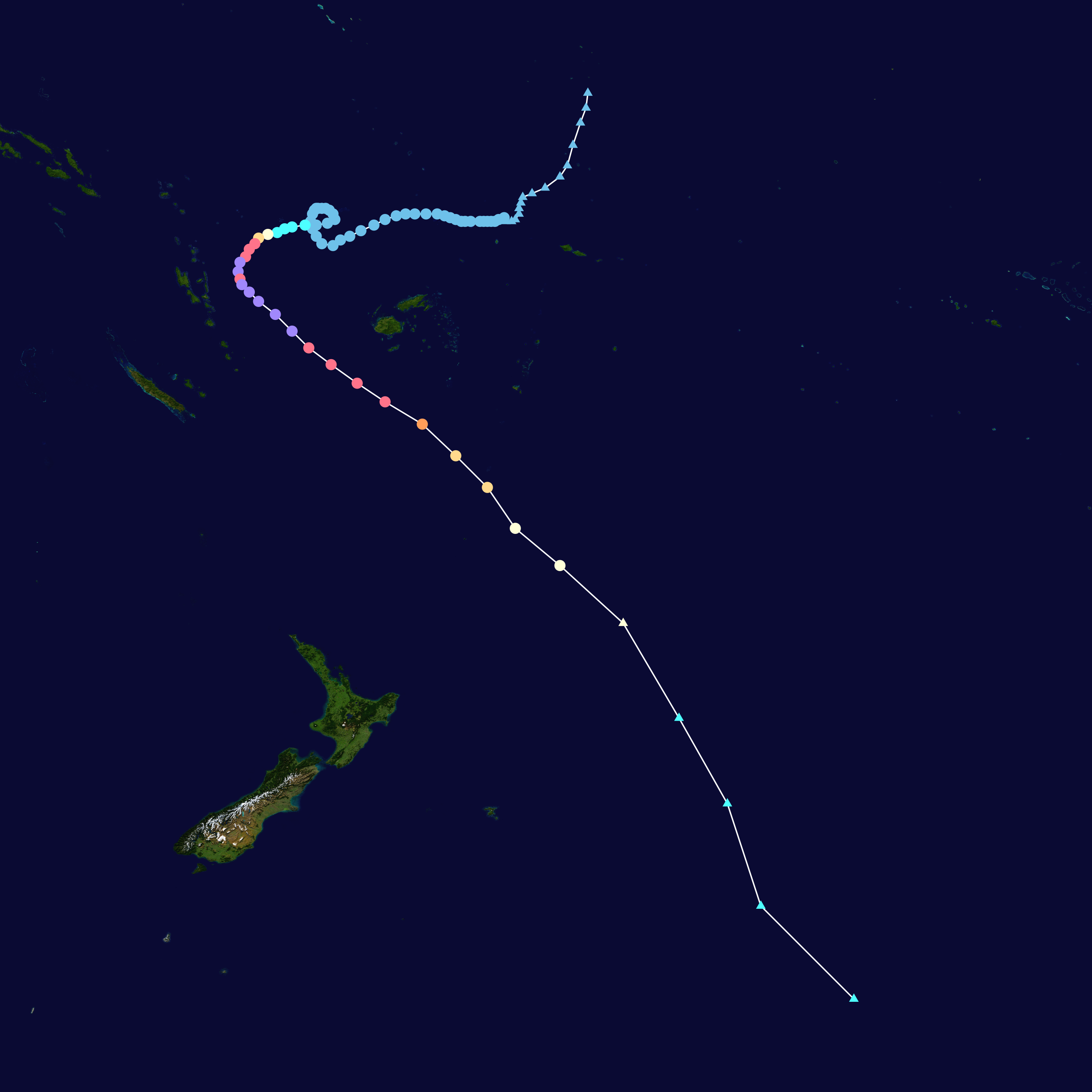
- Duration: December 20 – January 9
- Peak intensity: 230 km/h (145 mph) (10-min); 900 hPa (mbar)

On December 20, the FMS started to monitor a weak tropical disturbance that was located about 915 km (570 mi) to the northwest of Pago-Pago in American Samoa. Over the next two weeks, the disturbance gradually moved towards the west-southwest, without developing into a tropical cyclone. On January 3, the JTWC initiated warnings on the system and designated it as Tropical Cyclone 11P. Later that day, the FMS named the depression: Susan, after the system had intensified into a category 1 tropical cyclone, while it was located near Rotuma. During the day, the system continued to rapidly intensify with the FMS reporting early on January 4 that Susan had become a Category 3 severe tropical cyclone, with 10-minute sustained winds of 120 km/h (75 mph). Later that day, the JTWC reported that Susan had become equivalent to a Category 1 hurricane on the Saffir-Simpson Hurricane Scale, as atmospheric convection surrounding the system organized further and it developed an eye feature.

Susan subsequently moved towards the southwest as the subtropical ridge of high pressure weakened. Early on January 5, the FMS reported that Susan had peaked as a category 5 severe tropical cyclone with 10-minute sustained wind speeds of 145 mph (230 km/h), while the JTWC reported that Susan had peaked with 1-minute wind speeds of 160 mph (260 km/h) equivalent to a low-end Category 5 hurricane on the SSHS. As the system reached its peak intensity, Susan was moving towards the southwest and as a result, it began to pose a serious threat to Vanuatu. However, during that afternoon, Susan recurved back toward the southeast just in time to spare Vanuatu a direct hit. After turning away from Vanuatu, Susan began to accelerate towards the southeast while remaining near or at its peak intensities, before starting to weaken significantly during January 7. The FMS then reported early the next day that Susan had weakened into a Category 4 severe tropical cyclone while it was located about 435 km (270 mi) to the southeast of Nadi, Fiji, where it was close enough for the system to produce gale-force winds in several southern and western Fijian Islands. Later that day, Susan began to interact with Ron. By 0000 UTC on January 9, Susan had completely absorbed Ron. The final advisories on the combined system were then released later that day as Susan lost its tropical characteristics and began to undergo an extratropical transition. The remnants of the combined systems were then monitored for another day until they were last noted at 1200 UTC on January 10, bringing an unseasonable cold snap to New Zealand.

The total damage from Susan was minor. High seas in accordance with Susan inundated the village of Talaulia on Kadavu, Fiji. There was also some destroyed waterfront buildings, roads, jetties and bridges on Kadavu. On Beqa Island, only high seas and swells were experienced. In the town of Lautoka, on Viti Levu, roofs were blown off shops. This damage was possibly caused by a tornado that formed from one of the outer rain bands. One death was reported in accordance with Susan. This death was on Ambrym Island in Vanuatu, where a woman was killed by a falling coconut palm tree.

=== Severe Tropical Cyclone Ron ===
- Category 5 severe tropical cyclone (Australian scale)
- Category 5 tropical cyclone (SSHWS)
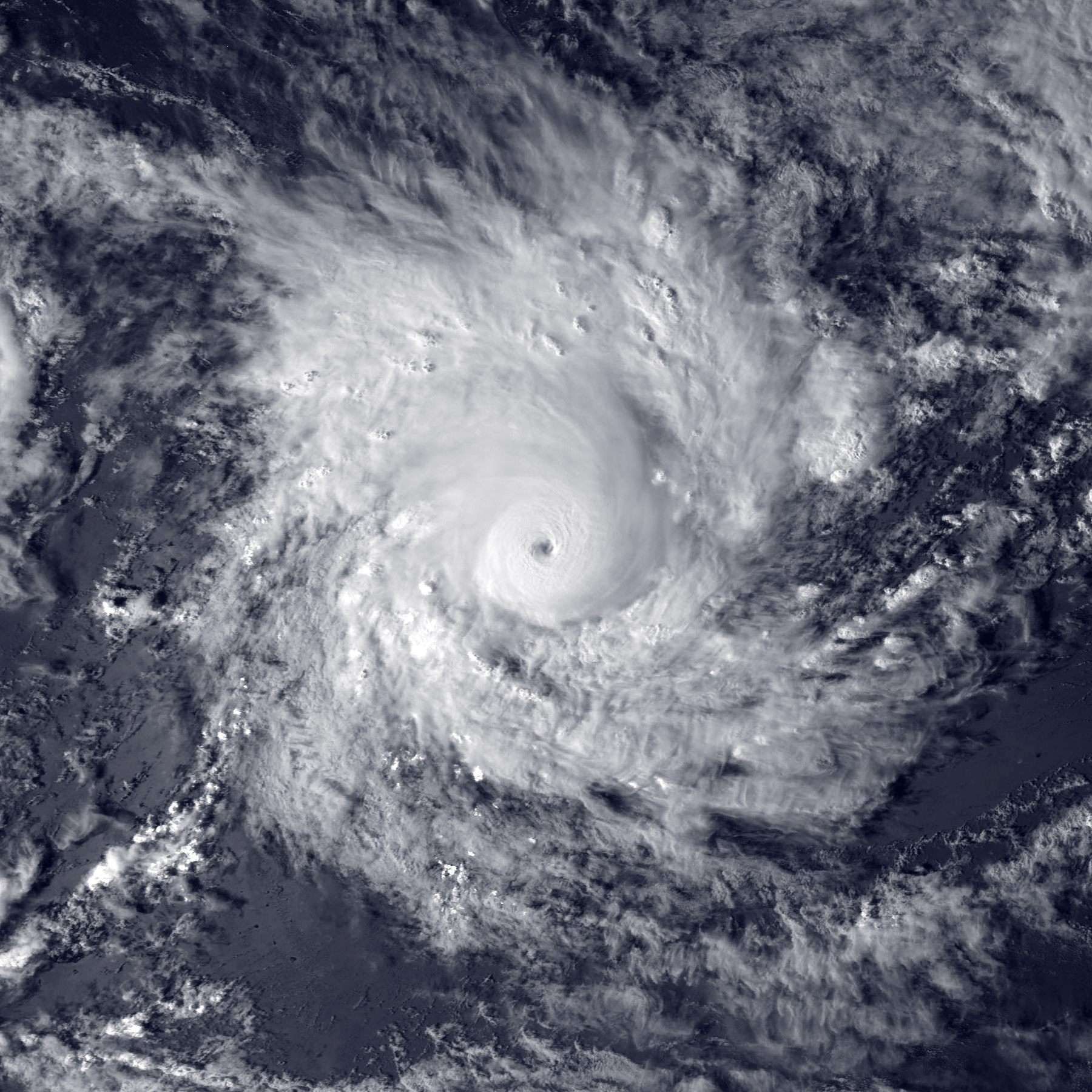
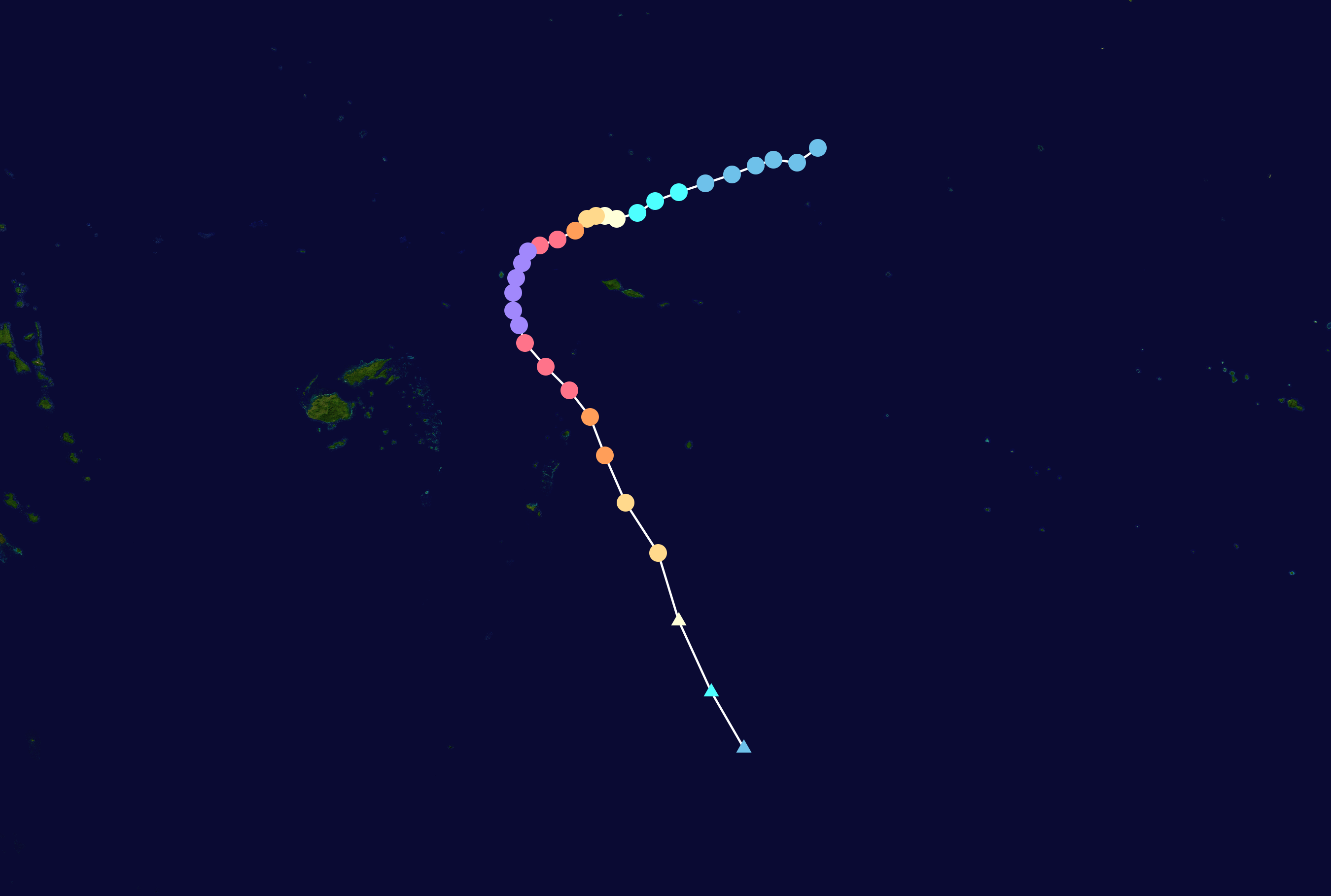
- Duration: January 1 – January 8
- Peak intensity: 230 km/h (145 mph) (10-min); 900 hPa (mbar)

On late December 1997, an area of low pressure developed to the northwest of the Cook Islands, gradually developing further over the next few days, before being classified as a tropical depression by FMS during January 1, 1998, and JTWC designating it as Tropical Cyclone 10P with 1-minute wind speeds of 65 km/h (40 mph). During the next day, the FMS reported that the system had developed into a Category 1 Tropical Cyclone and named it Ron. The system was steered south-westwards by a high-pressure area and gradually organized as its outflow improved, reaching Category 3 Severe Tropical Cyclone status during January 3, as it passed about 20 km (10 mi) to the north of Swains Island.

Ron continued to intensify and developed an eye, with FMS reporting that it had become a Category 5 Severe Tropical Cyclone at 00:00 UTC on January 5. FMS subsequently reported that the system peaked six hours later with estimated 10-minute sustained wind-speeds of 145 mph (235 km/h) and an estimated minimum pressure of 900 hPa (26.6 inHg), as it was located to the northeast of Wallis Island, while the JTWC reported that the system had peaked as a category 5 hurricane on the Saffir–Simpson hurricane wind scale, with 1-minute sustained wind speeds of 270 km/h (165 mph). Ron maintained its peak intensity for several days, while recurving southeastwards and passing about 55 km (35 mi) to the east of Wallis Island and about 30 km (20 mi) to the east of the Tongan island of Niuafo'ou.

On January 7, the system started to weaken as it accelerated towards colder waters, passing between the main Tongan islands and Niue. The next day it moved below 25S and left the tropics, before Ron was last noted being absorbed by Susan on January 9.

Ron affected several island throughout its path, triggering several governmental and organizational assistance programs. Swains Island sustained severe impacts to structures from winds of up to 145 km/h (90 mph), and its residents took shelter in a concrete structure. On Wallis and Futuna a crisis centre was set up in the capital Mata-Utu and Air Calédonie cancelled flights to the islands, as Wallis Island received winds of up to 130 km/h (80 mph), with Hihifo District recording rainfall totals of 109 mm (4.3 in), which lead to widespread damage to structures and food crops and disrupting water, electricity supplies and communication network, and Futuna Island recorded tidal waves of between 7–9 metres (23–30 ft), leading to evacuations further inland.

Ron became the strongest tropical cyclone on record in Tonga, as it passed near Niuafo'ou at peak intensity, reporting sustained winds of 110 km/h (70 mph), with peaks at between 125–145 km/h (80–90 mph). According to damage assessment, the cyclone left several families without home and dozens in need of tarpaulins to repair damages, most of them in the Niuafo'ou island. The system also damaged water and sanitation systems, leading to a water shortage, while an extensive food shortage was recorded because of severe damage to agriculture and vegetation of the islands.

=== Severe Tropical Cyclone Katrina ===
- Category 3 severe tropical cyclone (Australian scale)
- Category 2 tropical cyclone (SSHWS)
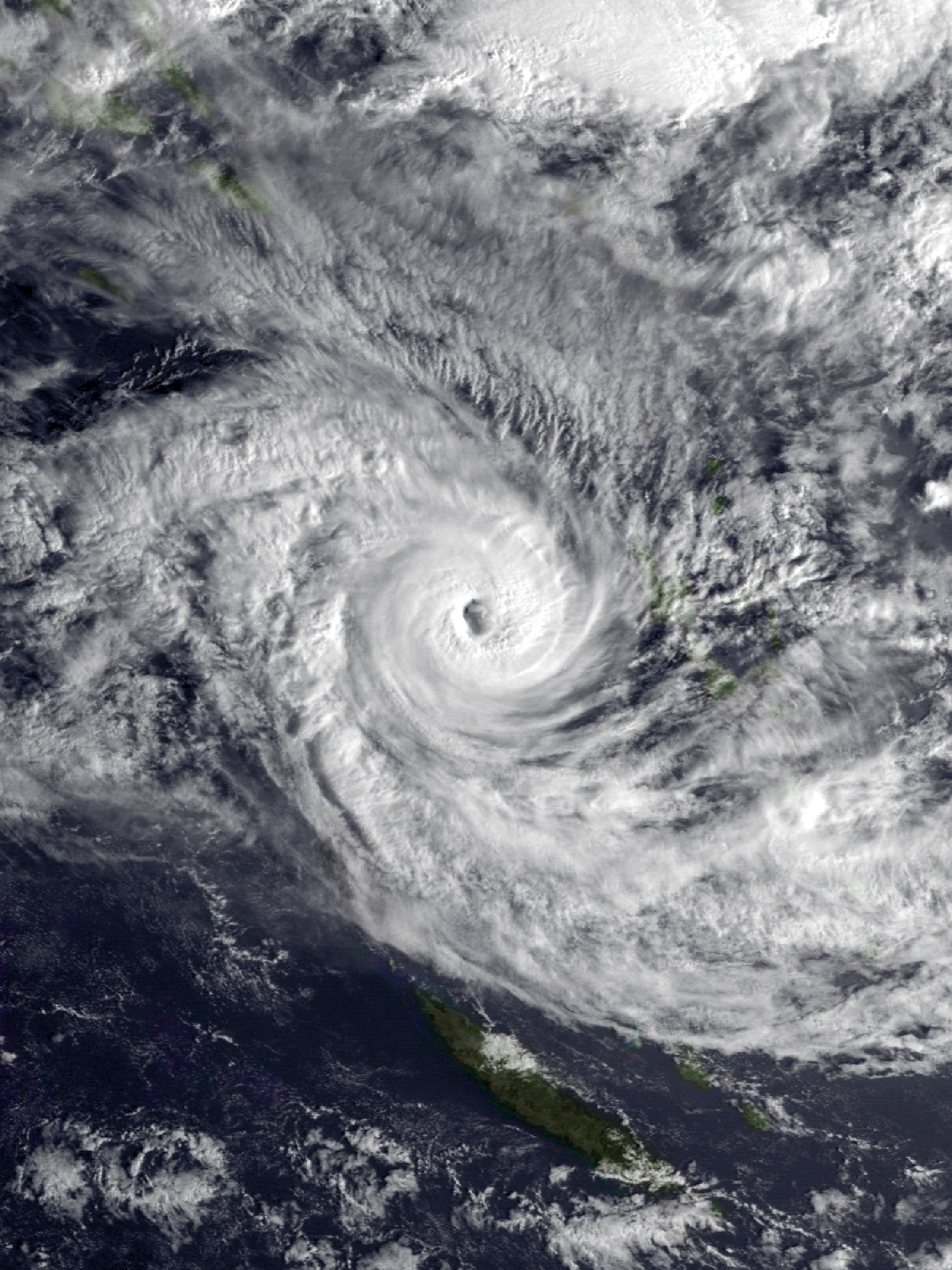
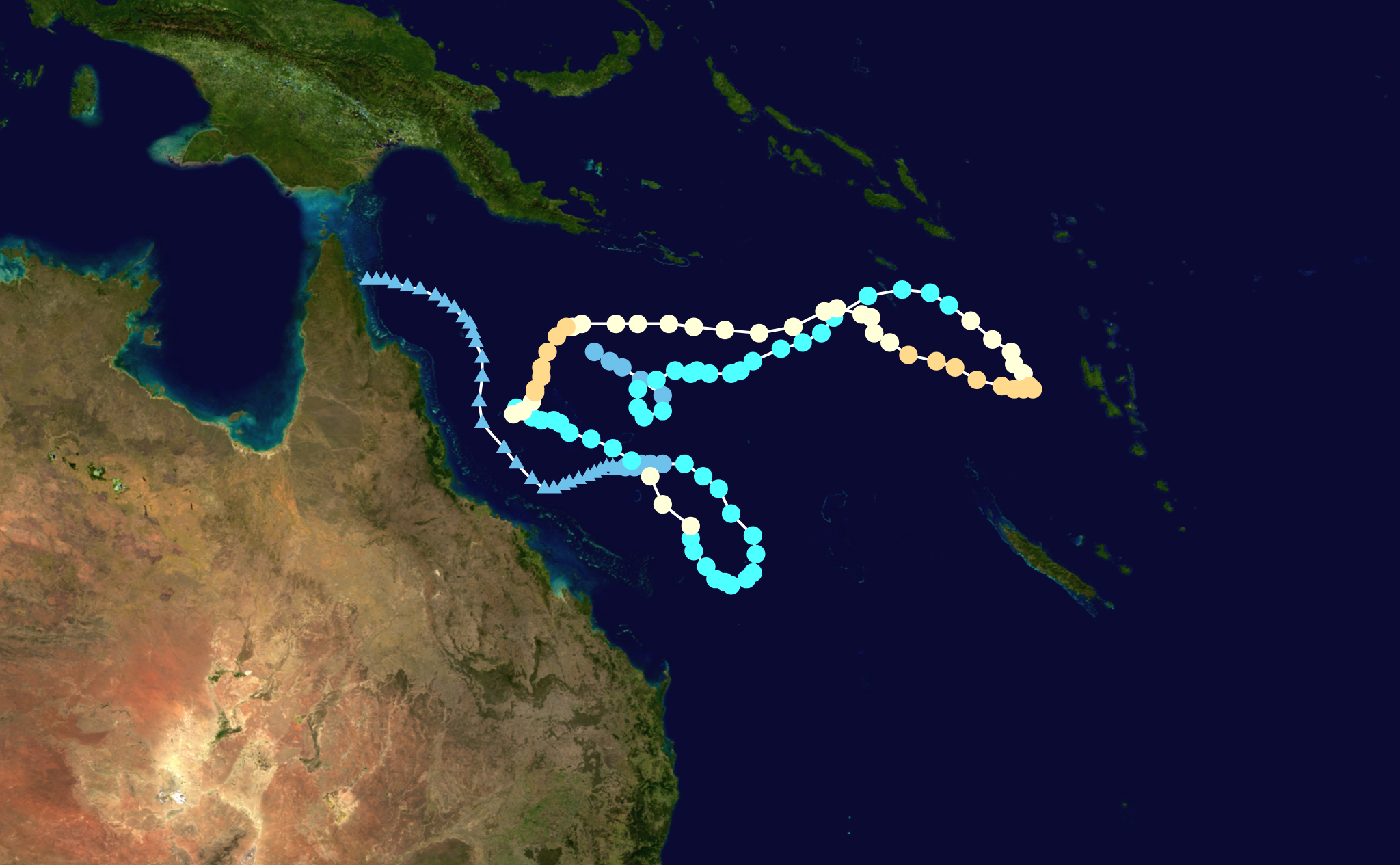
- Duration: January 7 (Entered basin) – January 11 (Exited basin)
- Peak intensity: 150 km/h (90 mph) (10-min); 950 hPa (mbar)

During January 7, Cyclone Katrina moved into the basin as a Category 2 tropical cyclone, while it was located about 90 km (55 mi) to the south of the island of Rennel, in the Solomon Islands. The system subsequently moved south-eastwards and intensified further, before it became a Category 3 Severe Tropical Cyclone and posed a threat to Vanuatu during the next day. It caused one death in Vanuatu, when a man drowned after being swept away by large swells and rough seas while fishing. The system then meandered within the Coral Sea between the Queensland coast and Vanuatu for the next three weeks, before degenerating into a remnant low near Far North Queensland on 25 January. After its decay, the remnants of Katrina moved westward over Cape York Peninsula and the Gulf of Carpentaria, before regenerating into Cyclone Victor on February 8, after which the system moved through the Northern Territory and into the Indian Ocean, over the course of the next week. Upon reaching the Indian Ocean on 16 February, the system was named "Cindy" by Mauritius, before eventually dissipating on 19 February.

Cyclone Katrina impacted parts of Queensland, Vanuatu, and the Solomon Islands, killing two people and causing $8.66 million (1998 USD) in damages.

=== Tropical Cyclone Tui ===
- Category 1 tropical cyclone (Australian scale)
- Tropical storm (SSHWS)
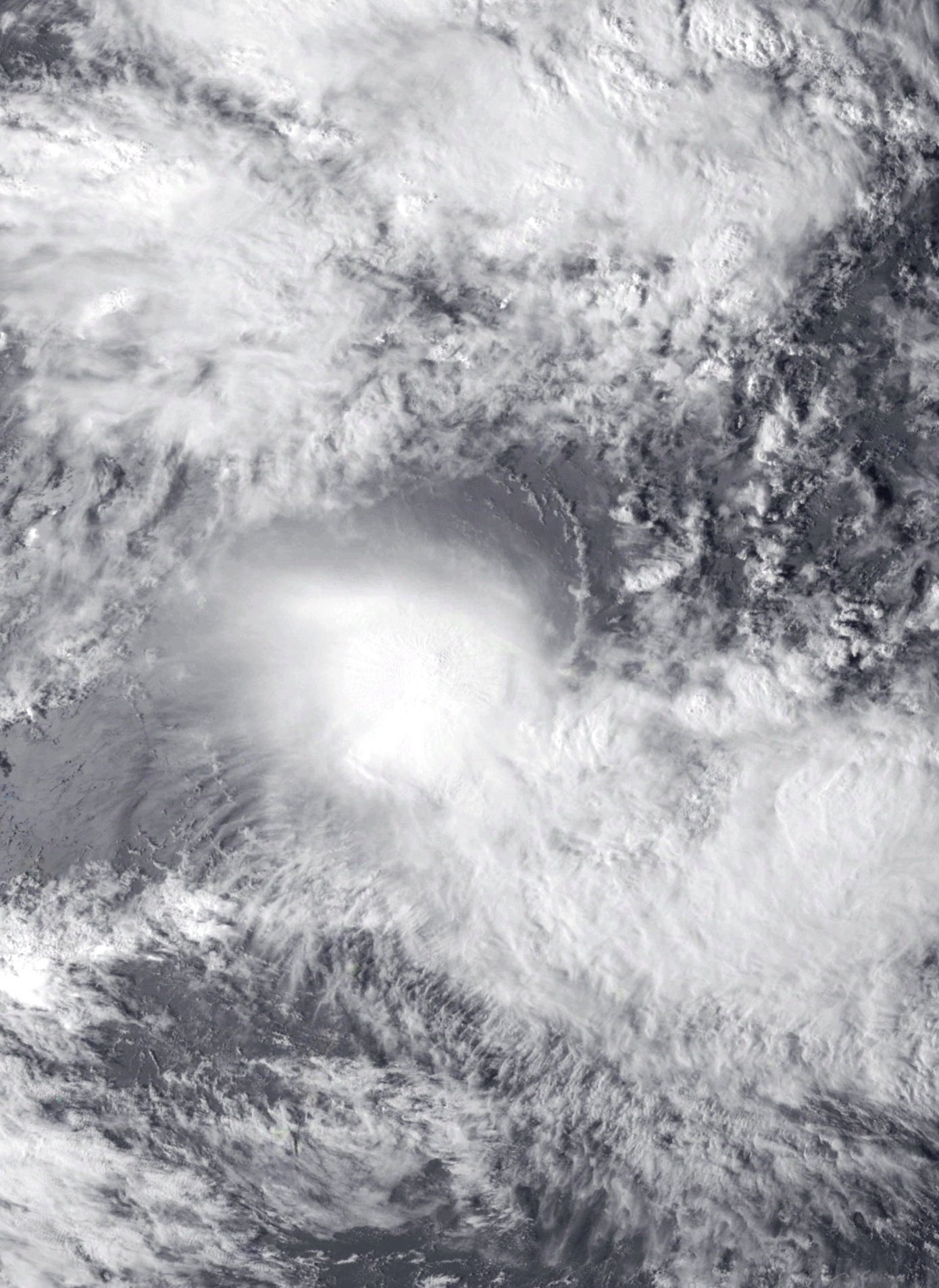
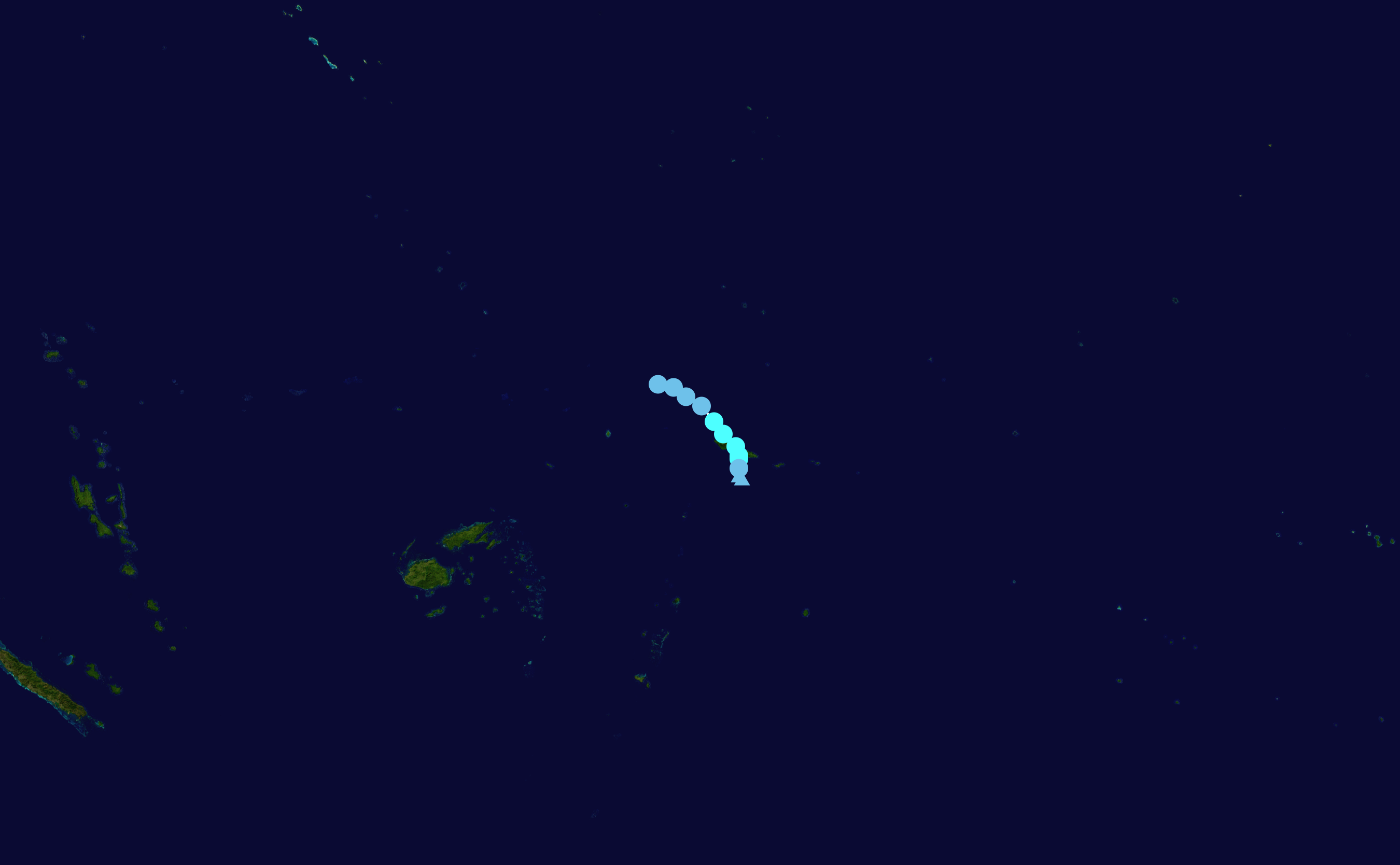
- Duration: January 24 – January 27
- Peak intensity: 75 km/h (45 mph) (10-min); 990 hPa (mbar)

The tropical disturbance that was to become Tropical Cyclone Tui was first noted on January 24, about 640 km (400 mi) to the northwest of Apia, Samoa. During that day, the system gradually moved southeastwards towards Samoa and developed further before the NPMOC initiated advisories on it and designated it as Tropical Cyclone 16P. The FMS subsequently reported that it had developed into a Category 1 tropical cyclone and named it Tui at around 2100 UTC on January 25, while it was located about 95 km (60 mi) to the northeast of Apia. During the following day, the newly named system passed over the Samoan islands of Savaiʻi and Upolu and moved back into the Pacific Ocean, where it remained near-stationary just to the south of Samoa and peaked with both 1- and 10-minute sustained winds of 75–85 km/h (45–50 mph) at around 1800 UTC.

Strong vertical wind shear subsequently caused Tui to weaken, with its low-level circulation centre becoming exposed, while atmospheric convection associated with the system rapidly dissipated. As a result, the FMS reported that it had weakened into a depression, while the NPMOC issued its final advisory at 0900 UTC on January 27. After Tui weakened, its remnants remained in the general vicinity of the Samoan islands and possibly redeveloped on January 31; however, as various other areas of low pressure had developed in the meantime, the FMS decided to treat the redevelopment as Tropical Cyclone Wes. Tui brought gale-force winds, heavy rain and rough seas to both Samoa and American Samoa, where it caused large crop losses as well as some infrastructure damage on Savaiʻi. However, the damage was considered to be relatively minor, with an estimate of 2.5 million SAT ($850 000 USD) reported in Samoa. A young boy was also killed on Savaiʻi after he stepped into an electrified puddle of water.

=== Tropical Cyclone Ursula ===
- Category 2 tropical cyclone (Australian scale)
- Category 1 tropical cyclone (SSHWS)
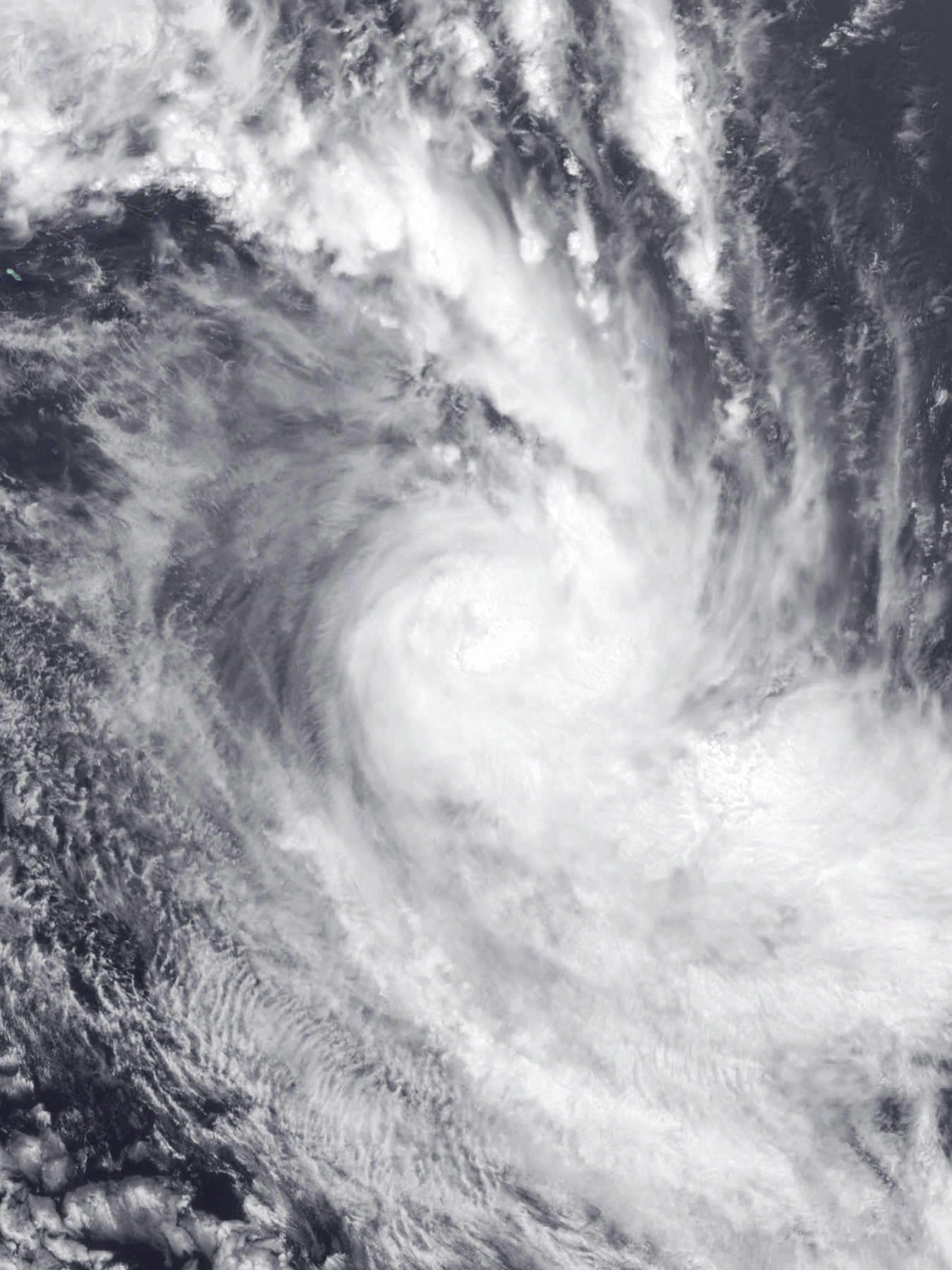
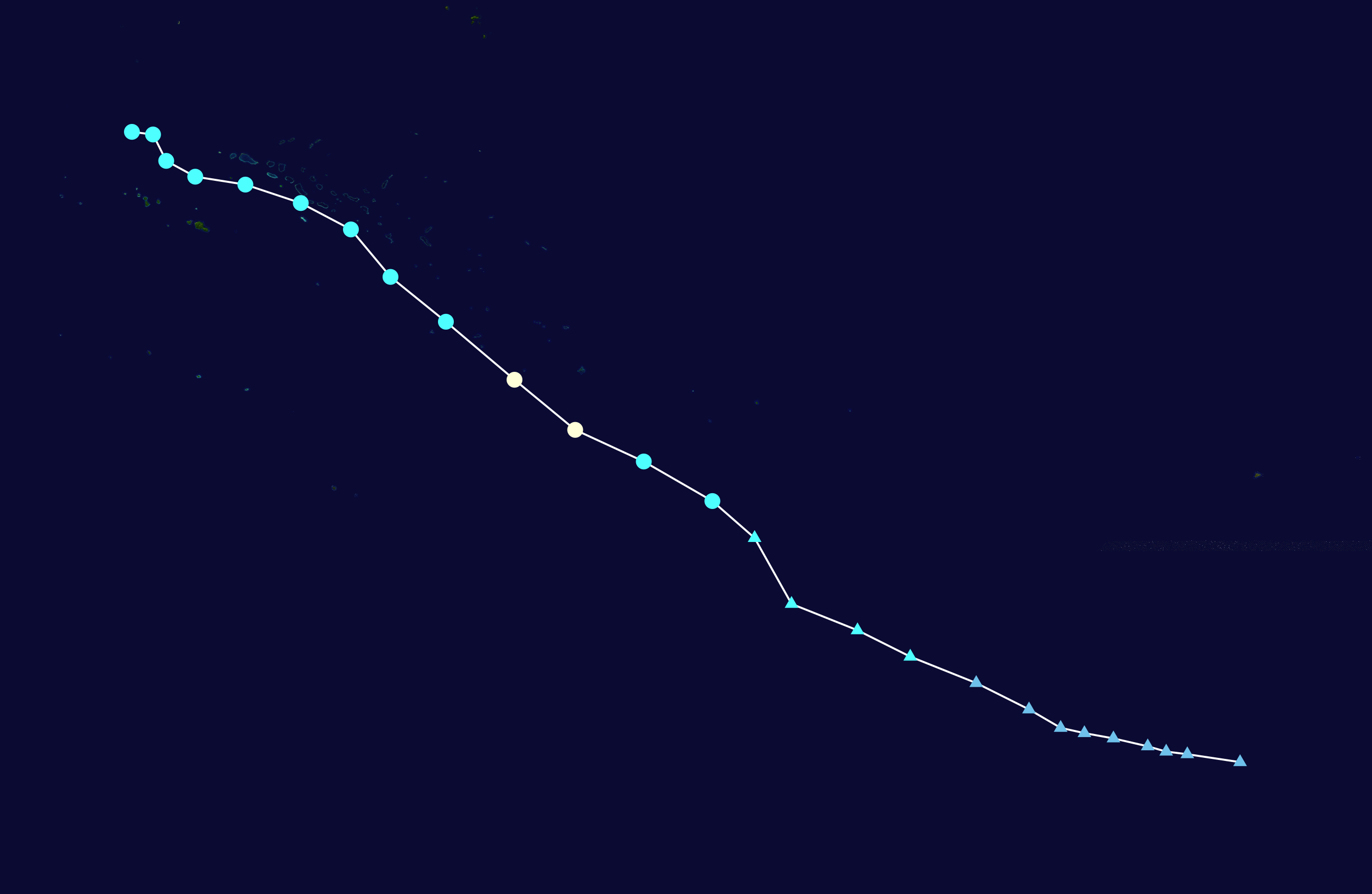
- Duration: January 29 – February 2
- Peak intensity: 110 km/h (70 mph) (10-min); 975 hPa (mbar)

On January 29, the FMS started to monitor a new tropical depression that had developed to the northeast of Tahiti in French Polynesia during January 29. Over the next day the system subsequently moved south-eastwards and gradually developed further, before it was declared to be a Category 1 tropical cyclone and named Ursula by the FMS. Ursula subsequently gradually intensified and accelerated towards the south-east, as it got caught up in a westerly flow and passed through French Polynesia's Tuamotu Islands. During February 1, the system peaked as a Category 2 tropical cyclone with 10-minute wind speeds of 110 km/h (70 mph), before the NPMOC initiated advisories and designated Ursula as Tropical Cyclone 17P, with peak 1-minute wind speeds of 120 km/h (75 mph). Over the next day the system transitioned into an extratropical cyclone, before the remnants were last noted on February 5, while they were located around 4350 km (2705 mi) to the southwest of Lima, Peru. In association with Tropical Cyclone Veli, Ursula brought significant waves which caused minor damages to three Tuamotuan islands of Mataiva, Rangiroa, Makatea. Mataiva was the worst hit island with 39 homes damaged, while roads and bridges were washed away. On Makatea island five houses were damaged while operations at Rangiroa's airstrip were disrupted, after coral and sand washed up onshore.

=== Tropical Cyclone Veli ===
- Category 2 tropical cyclone (Australian scale)
- Category 1 tropical cyclone (SSHWS)
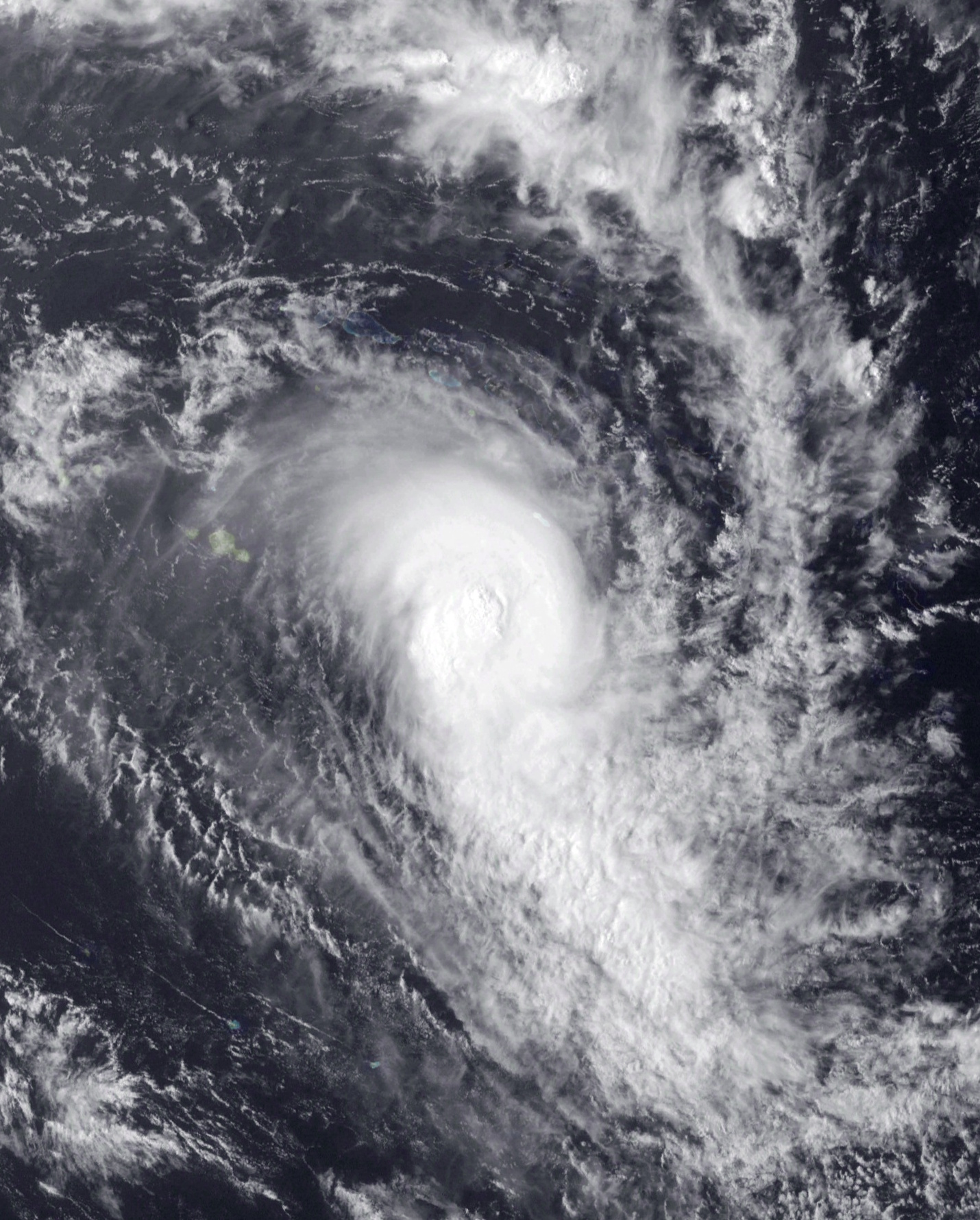
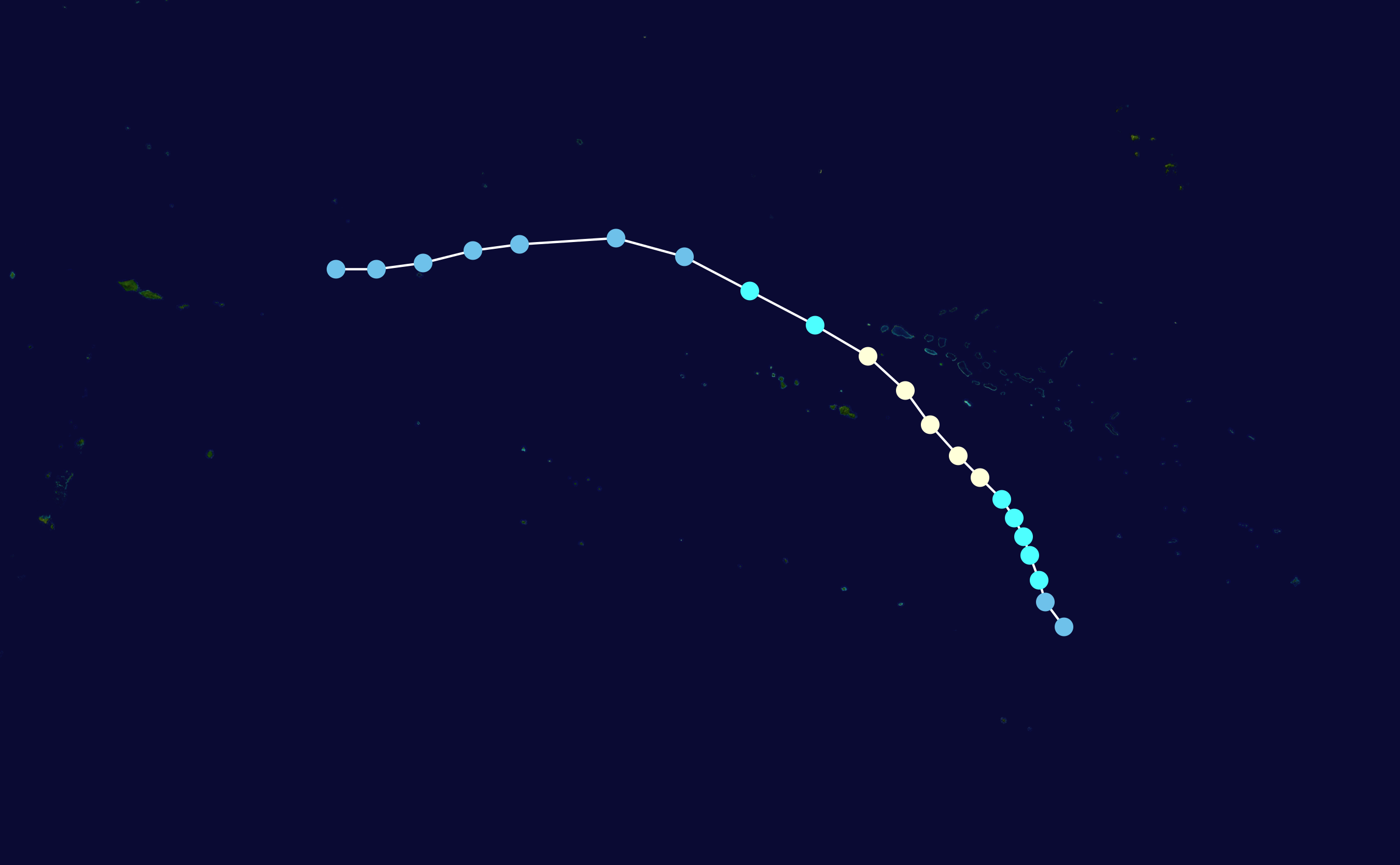
- Duration: January 30 – February 3
- Peak intensity: 100 km/h (65 mph) (10-min); 980 hPa (mbar)

On January 30, a tropical depression developed about 650 km (405 mi) to the northeast of Apia in Samoa. Over the next couple of days, the system moved eastwards while gradually developing further, with the NPMOC issuing a tropical cyclone formation alert on the system early on February 1. Later that day, the FMS named the system Veli as it had intensified into a Category 1 tropical cyclone, while it came under the influence of a mid-level trough of low pressure and moved south-eastwards. Later that day, the NPMOC started to issue warnings on the system and designated it as Tropical Cyclone 18P, after it had continued to organize and convection surrounding the system had increased. During that day, Veli continued to move towards the southeast while gradually intensifying, before early the next day the NPMOC reported that the system had peaked with 1-minute sustained wind speeds of 140 km/h (85 mph). Veli peaked as a Category 2 tropical cyclone early on February 2, with 10-minute sustained wind speeds of 100 km/h (65 mph). Over the next few days, the cyclone moved through French Polynesia's Tuamotu Islands, as it began to experience significant vertical wind shear and weakened into a depression. The system was subsequently monitored until it was last noted on February 4, about 1,500 km (930 mi) to the northwest of Adamstown on the Pitcairn Islands. In conjunction with Tropical Cyclone Ursula, Veli brought significant waves to Tuamotu province and caused minor damage on the islands of Mataiva, Rangiroa and Makatea. Mataiva was the worst hit island, with roads and bridges washed away, and 39 homes damaged. On Makatea five houses were damaged while operations at Rangiroa's airstrip were disrupted after coral and sand washed onshore.

=== Tropical Cyclone Wes ===
- Category 2 tropical cyclone (Australian scale)
- Tropical storm (SSHWS)
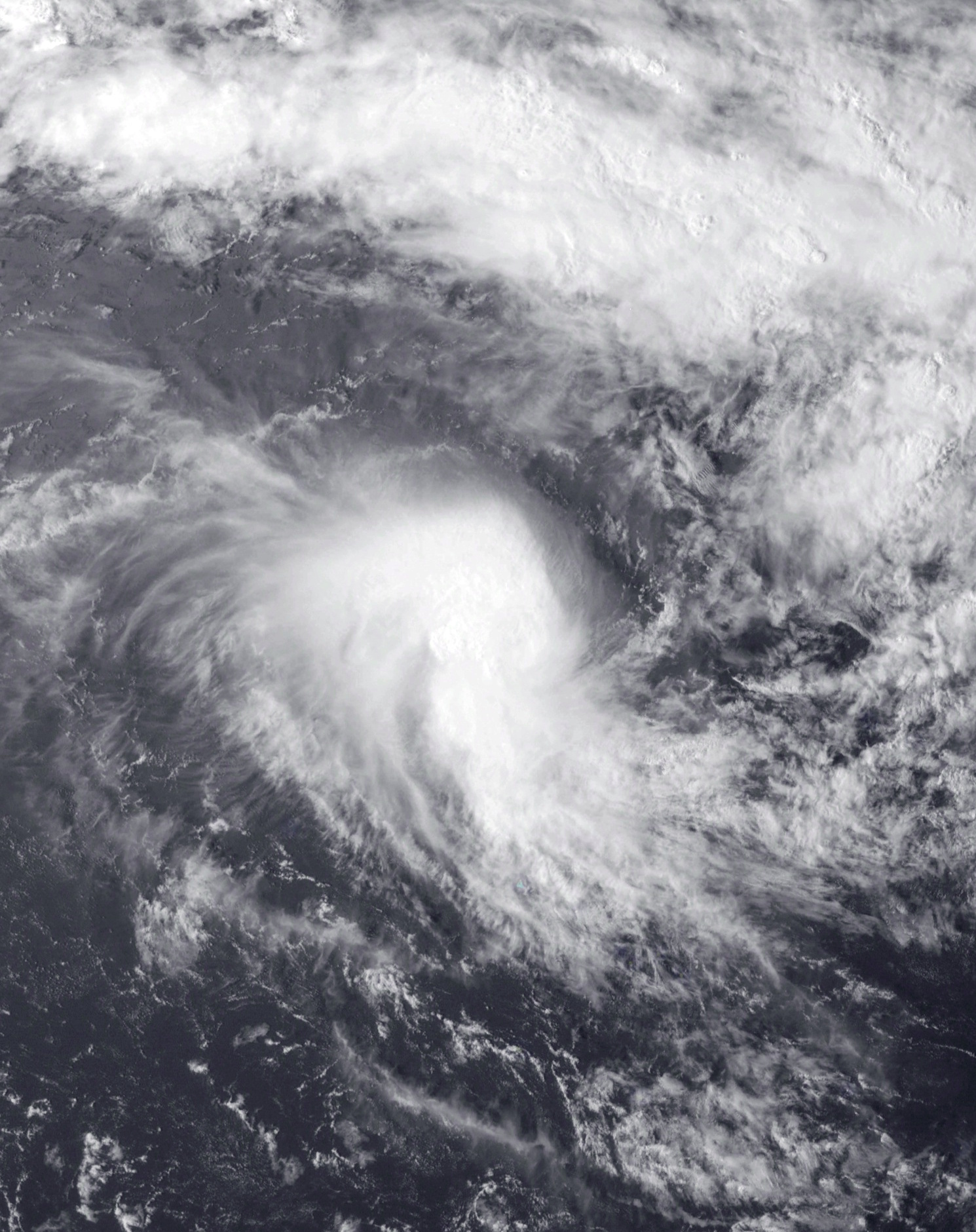
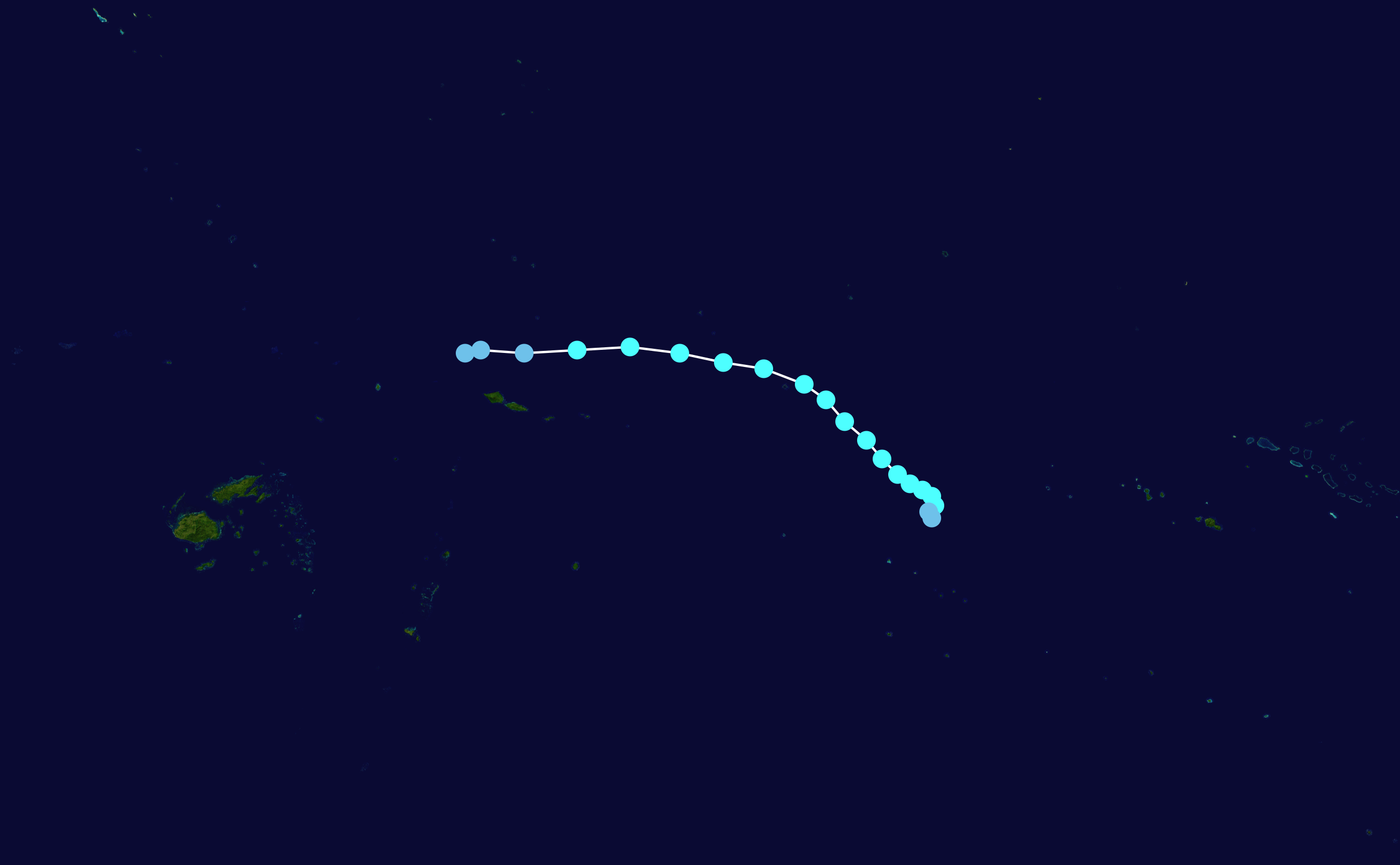
- Duration: January 31 – February 5
- Peak intensity: 95 km/h (60 mph) (10-min); 985 hPa (mbar)

On January 31, the FMS reported that a tropical depression had developed within the South Pacific Convergence Zone, about 230 km (145 mi) to the northwest of the American Samoan island of Apia. During that day the depression moved slowly eastwards and intensified further, before it was named Wes by the FMS, after it had developed into a Category 1 tropical cyclone during February 1. The NPMOC subsequently designated it as Tropical Cyclone 19P and initiated advisories later that day, with them estimating that the system had 1-minute sustained wind speeds of 95 km/h (60 mph). The system subsequently continued to move eastwards and passed about 95 km (60 mi) to the south of the Cook Island: Nassau. During February 3, the FMS reported that the system had peaked, with 10-minute sustained wind speeds of 85 km/h (50 mph) which made it a category 2 tropical cyclone on the Australian scale. Later that day the system subsequently started to rapidly weaken as it moved into an area of higher vertical wind shear and interacted with the westerlies. The system was subsequently last noted during February 5, while located about 400 km (250 mi) to the east of Papeete, on the island of Tahiti, French Polynesia. The system did not directly affect any inhabited islands, while there was no damage reported on Suwarrow from the system. However, 10 people were killed on the French Polynesian island of Tahaa, after two days of heavy rain associated with Wes caused a landslide during February 6.

=== Severe Tropical Cyclone Yali ===
- Category 3 severe tropical cyclone (Australian scale)
- Category 2 tropical cyclone (SSHWS)
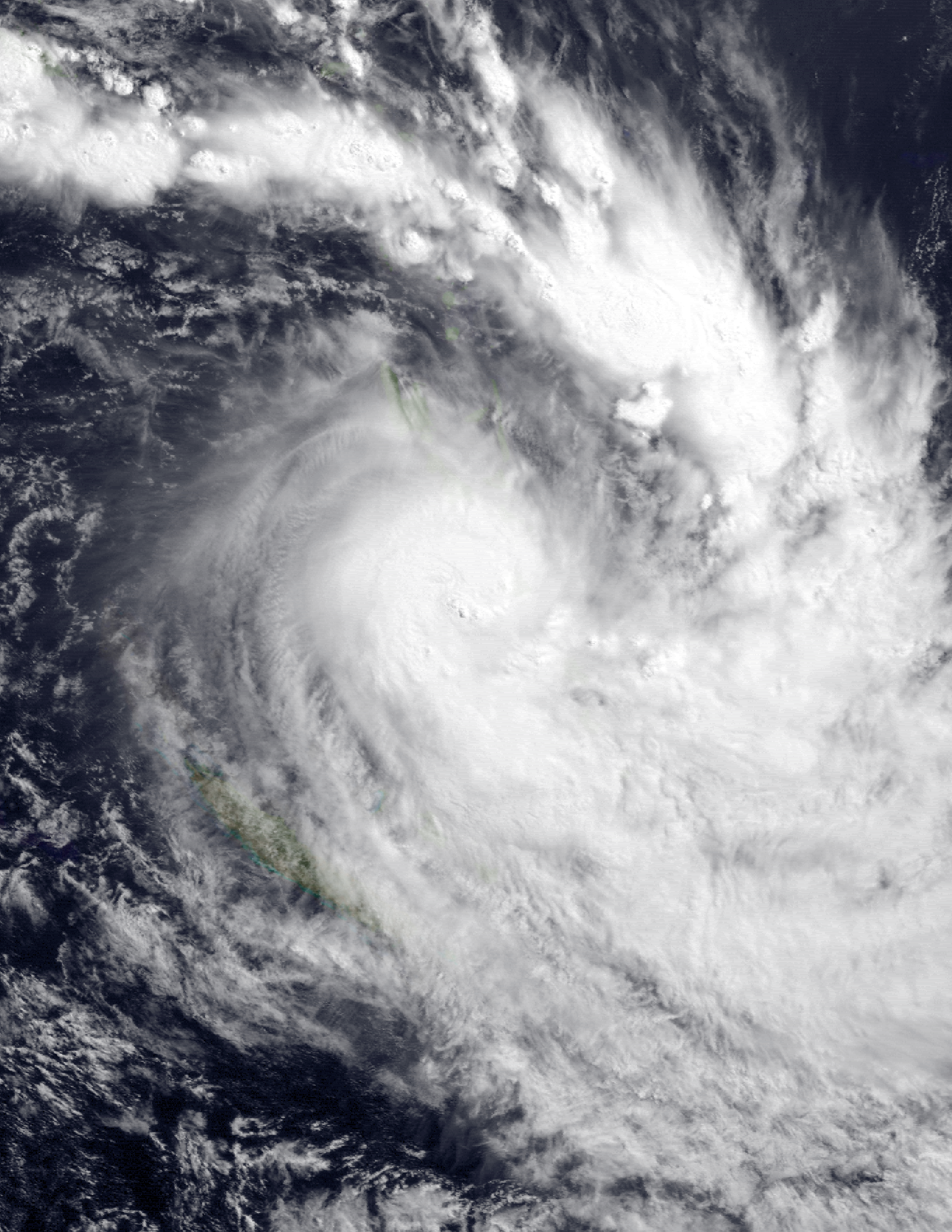
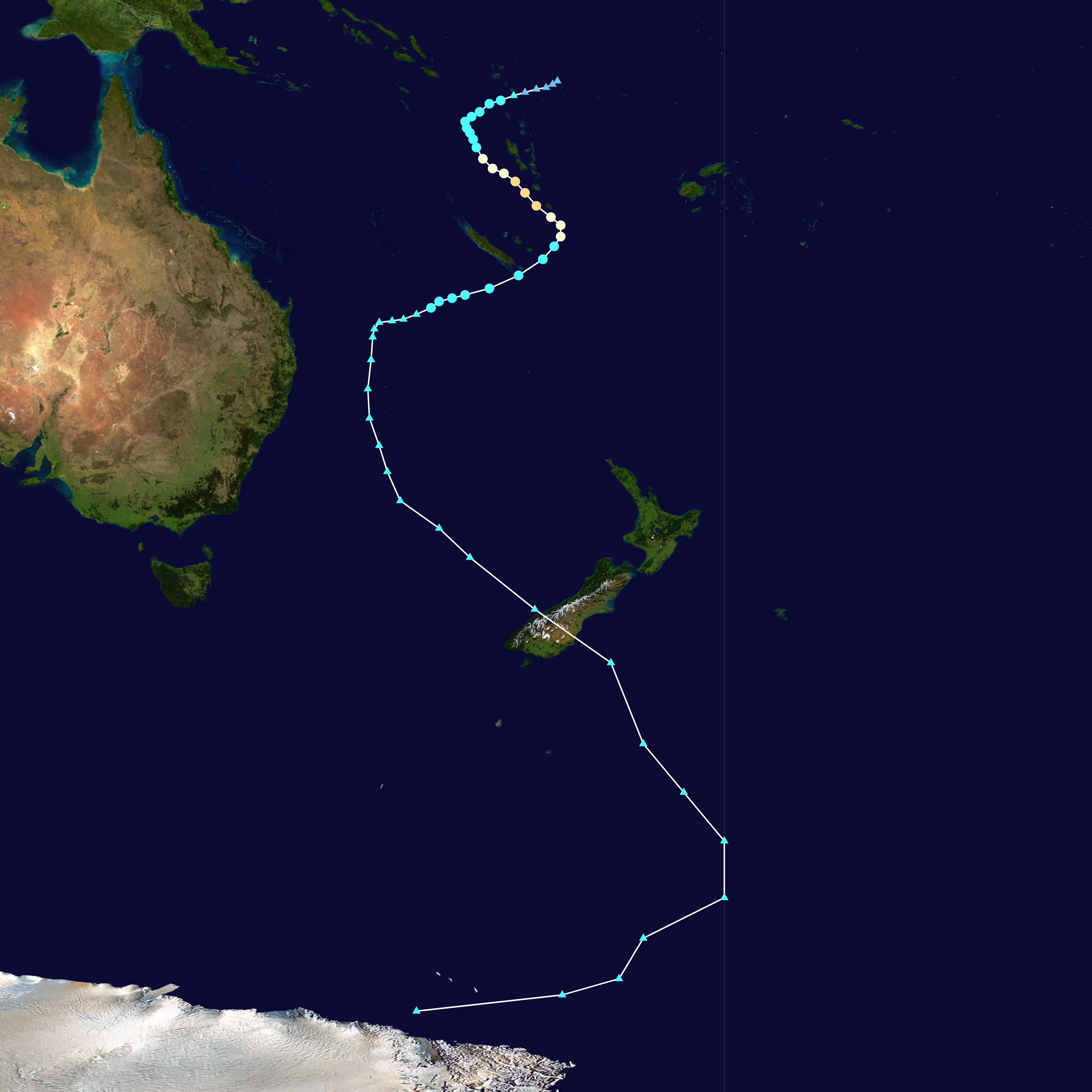
- Duration: March 18 – March 25
- Peak intensity: 130 km/h (80 mph) (10-min); 965 hPa (mbar)

The system that was to become Yali was first noted as a tropical disturbance, to the northeast of Vanuatu during March 17. During that day atmospheric convection over the disturbance's low level circulation center became better defined, before the JTWC initiated advisories and designated the system as Tropical Cyclone 29P, while the system was located about 650 km (405 mi) to the north-northwest of Port Vila. Over the next day the system moved towards the west-southwest between Vanuatu and the Solomon Islands under the influence of the subtropical ridge of high pressure to the south of the system. The FMS subsequently reported late on March 19, that the system had developed into a category 1 tropical cyclone and named it Yali. After it was named Yali re-curved and started moving towards the south-southeast, as the monsoonal flow to the north of the system strengthened.

=== Severe Tropical Cyclone Zuman ===
- Category 3 severe tropical cyclone (Australian scale)
- Category 3 tropical cyclone (SSHWS)
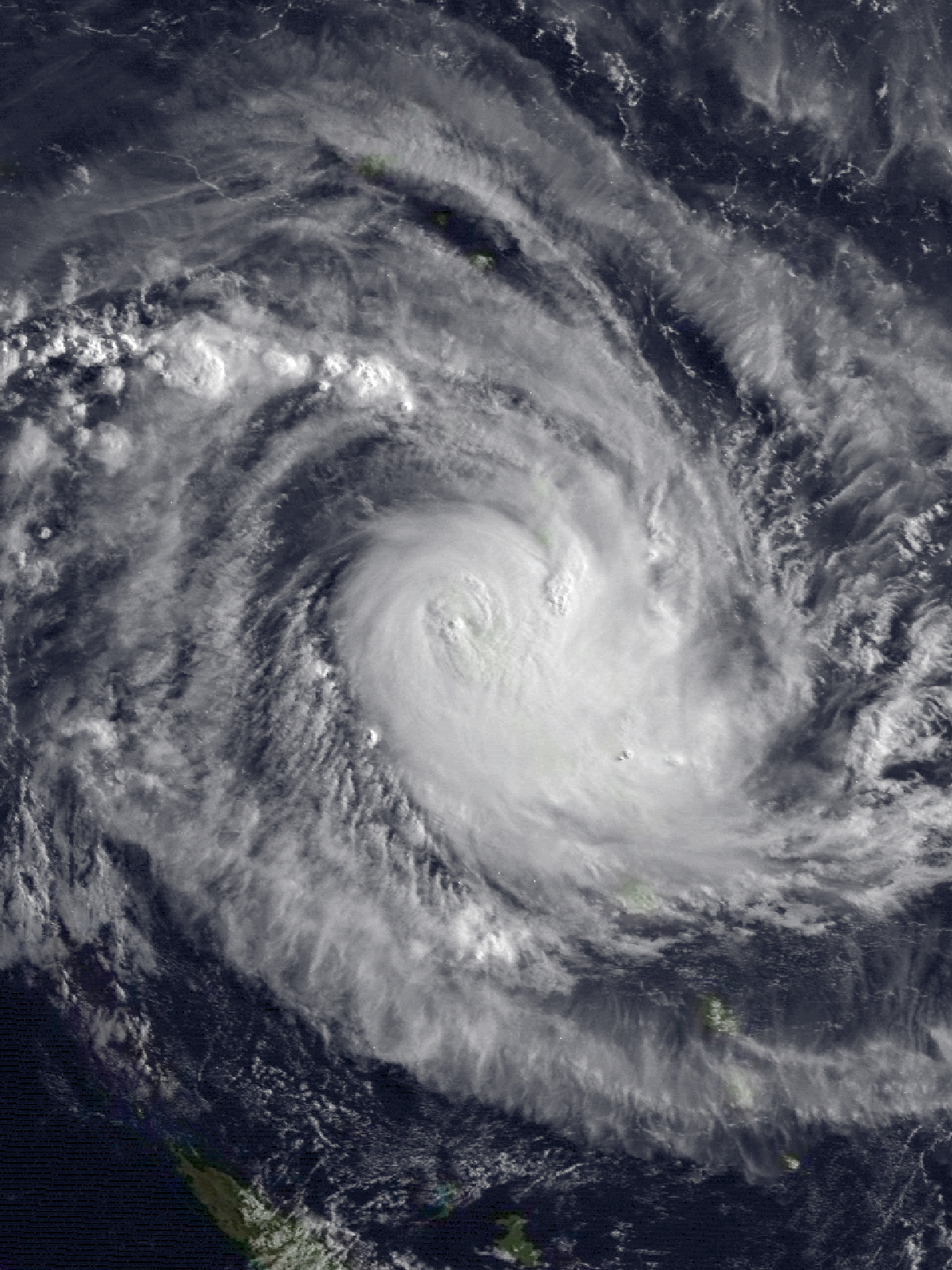
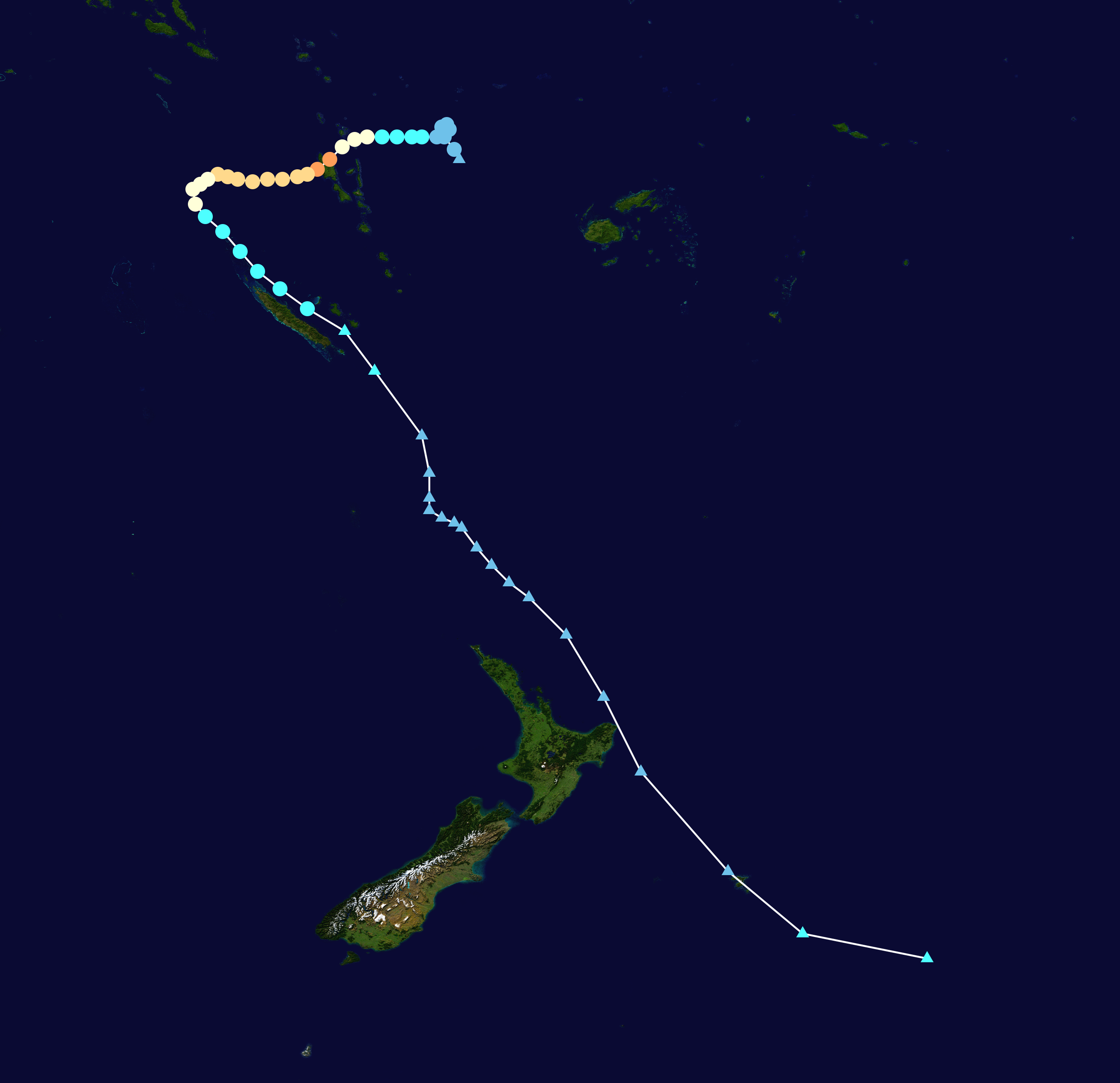
- Duration: March 29 – April 5
- Peak intensity: 150 km/h (90 mph) (10-min); 955 hPa (mbar)

During March 29, the JTWC issued a Tropical Cyclone Formation Alert, on a tropical disturbance that they had been monitoring for around a day to the northwest of Fiji. At this stage, atmospheric convection had started to persist over the systems low level circulation center, while an upper-level anticyclone had developed over the disturbance. During that day, the system was steered westwards towards Vanuatu, within an area of warm sea surface temperatures and weakening vertical windshear, by an upper-level ridge of high pressure located to the south of the system. The Fiji Meteorological Service subsequently classified the disturbance as a tropical depression, while the JTWC designated it as Tropical Cyclone 31P during March 30. The system subsequently continued to develop during the next day and was named Zuman by the FMS after it had developed into a Category 1 tropical cyclone on the Australian tropical cyclone intensity scale.

=== Tropical Cyclone Alan ===
- Category 1 tropical cyclone (Australian scale)
- Tropical storm (SSHWS)
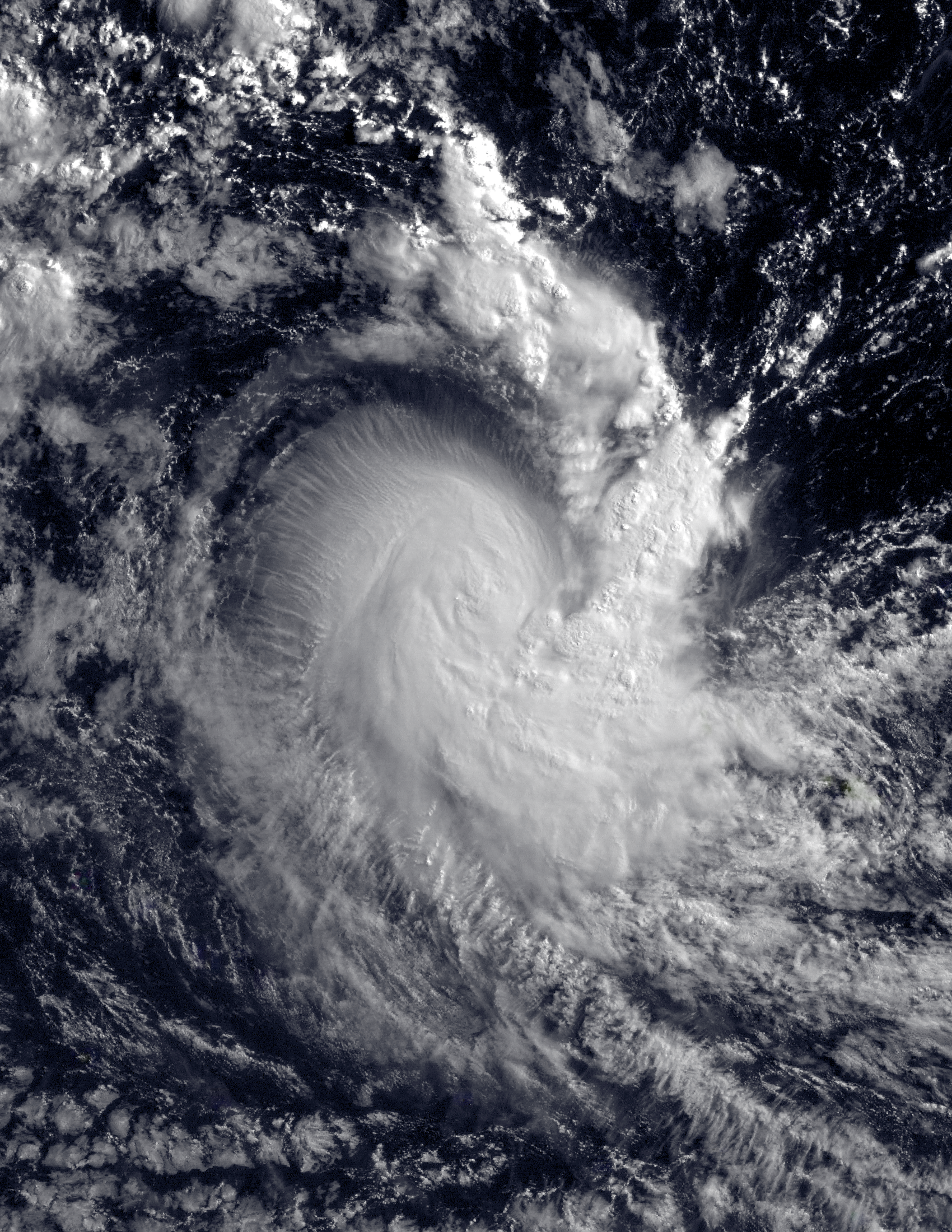
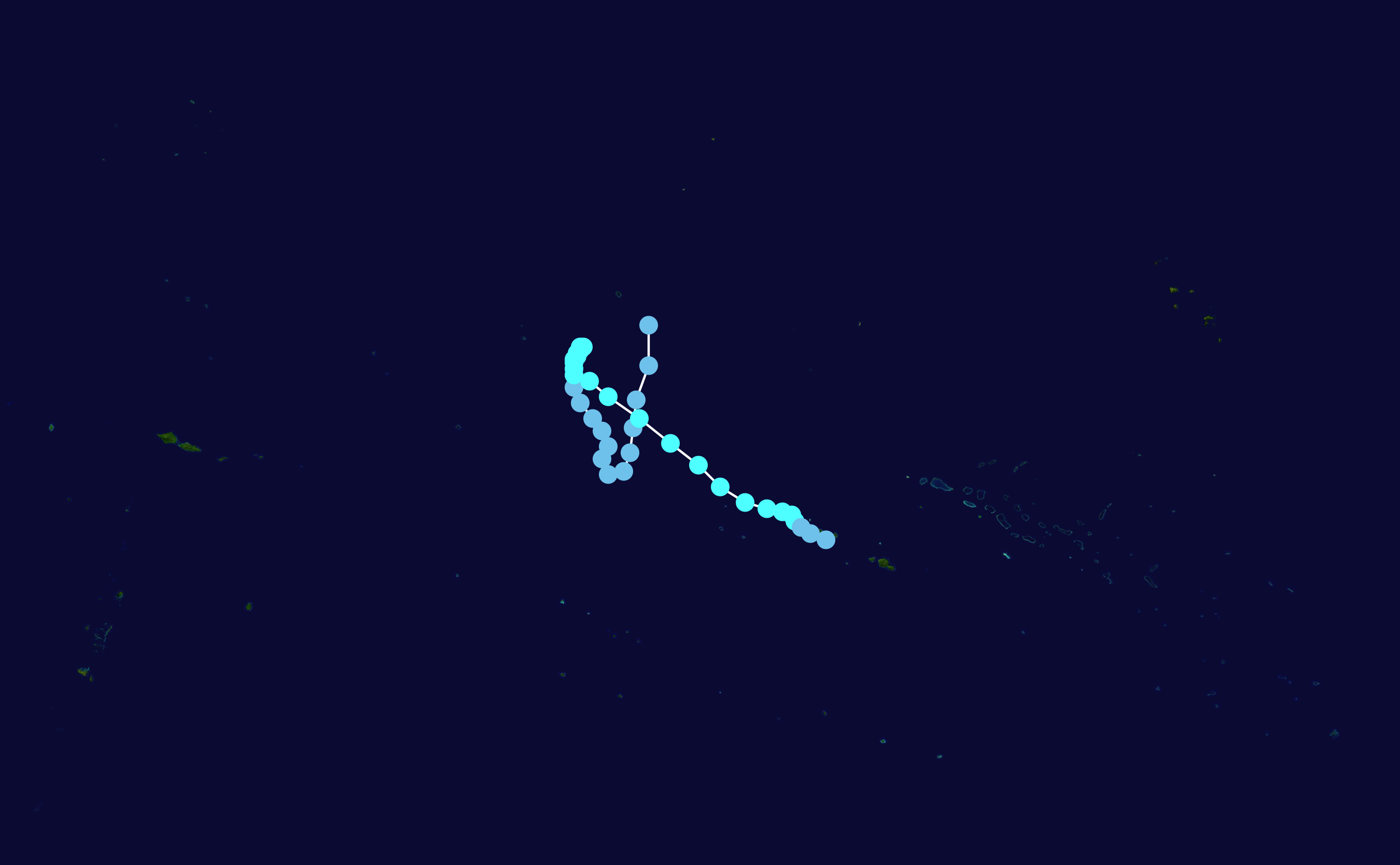
- Duration: April 17 – April 26
- Peak intensity: 75 km/h (45 mph) (10-min); 992 hPa (mbar)

On April 17, the FMS started to monitor a tropical disturbance, that had developed to the east of the Northern Cook Islands. Over the next few days the system moved erratically, before it developed into a Category 1 tropical cyclone and was named Alan by the FMS during April 21. When it was named the system was located about 300 km (185 mi) to the east-southeast of Manihiki and had started to move westwards. During April 22, the FMS estimated that Alan had reached its peak intensity with 10-minute sustained wind speeds of 75 km/h (45 mph), as the system started to pose several forecasting challenges as it was difficult to locate and estimate how intense the system was. Later that day the NPMOC started to issue warnings on Alan and estimated peak 1-minute sustained wind speeds of 85 km/h (50 mph). During April 23, the system appeared to become sheared with the low level circulation centre displaced about 20 km (10 mi) from the nearest atmospheric convection. As a result, the FMS reported that Alan had weakened into a depression, while the NPMOC issued their final advisory on the system. Over the next day as a mid level trough of low pressure that had been shearing the system moved faster than expected the depression became better organized.

As a result, the NPMOC initiated advisories on the system again during April 24, while the FMS reported that Alan had re-intensified into a category 1 tropical cyclone later that day. The system was now located about 555 km (345 mi) to the west-northwest of the French Polynesian island of Tahiti, and was now moving towards the south-southeast under the influence of an upper level anticyclone located to the east of Alan. Early on April 25, Alan passed near too or over the French Polynesian Society Islands of Maupiti, Bora-Bora, and Raiatea. During April 25, strong wind shear pulled the system apart, with visible imagery showing that the system had a fully exposed low level circulation. As a result, the FMS reported that the system had weakened into a depression later that day, while it was located about 185 km (115 mi) to the west-northwest of Tahiti. The NPMOC subsequently reissued their final advisory early the next day, as the system drifted towards the south-southeast while located to the west of Tahiti. The system affected French Polynesia with high winds and torrential rain, which caused several landslides within the Society Islands. The landslides caused two bridges to collapse and along with fallen trees blocked roads. Overall ten people died as a result of the system while thirty others were injured, with the majority of the casualties occurring due to landslides. On the islands of Ra'iātea, Tahaa and Huahine several churches, schools and clinics were damaged while water and electricity supplies were cut off. Within the islands around 750 houses were destroyed with 430 and 150 of these occurring on Huahine and Ra'iātea respectively.

=== Tropical Cyclone Bart ===
- Category 1 tropical cyclone (Australian scale)
- Tropical storm (SSHWS)
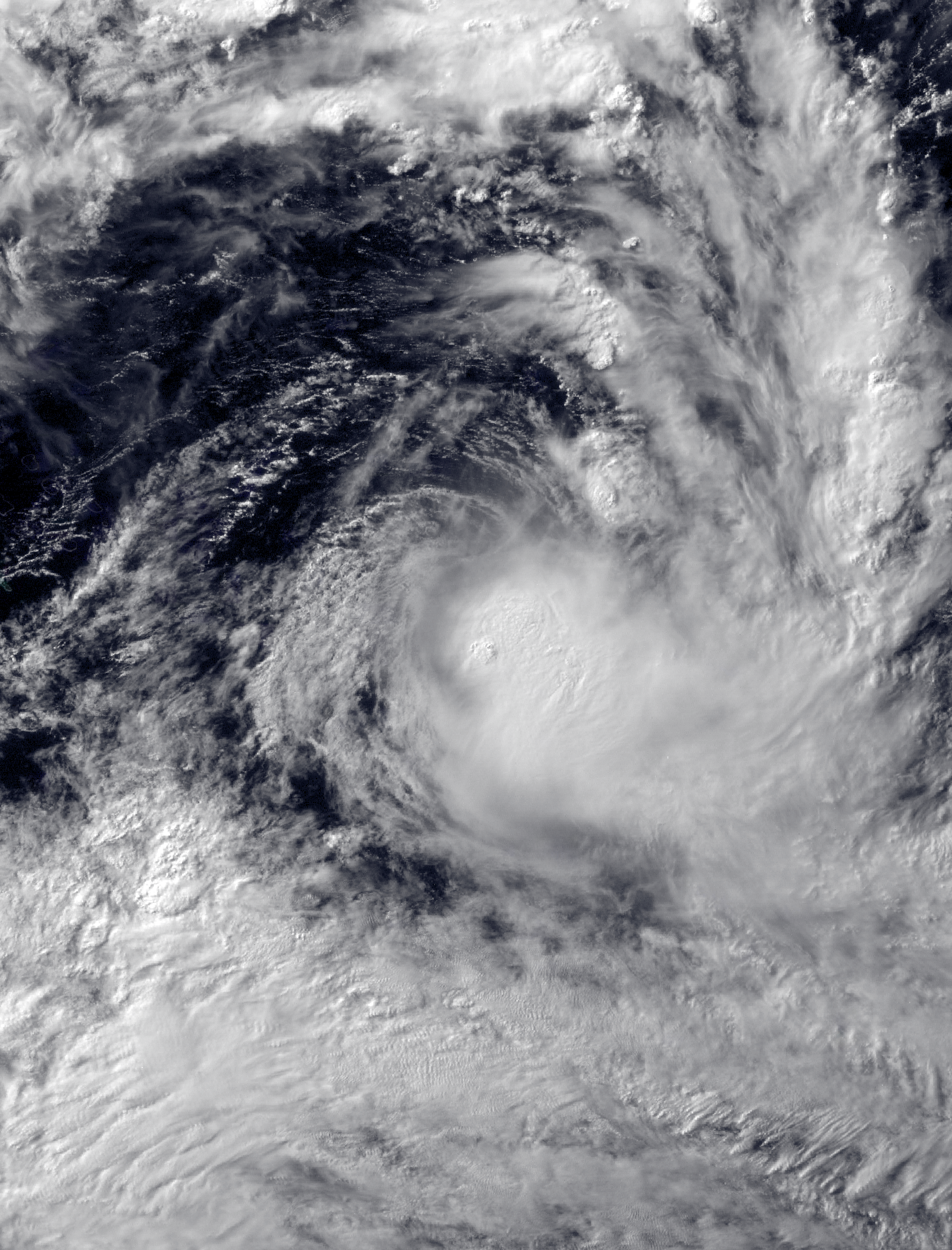
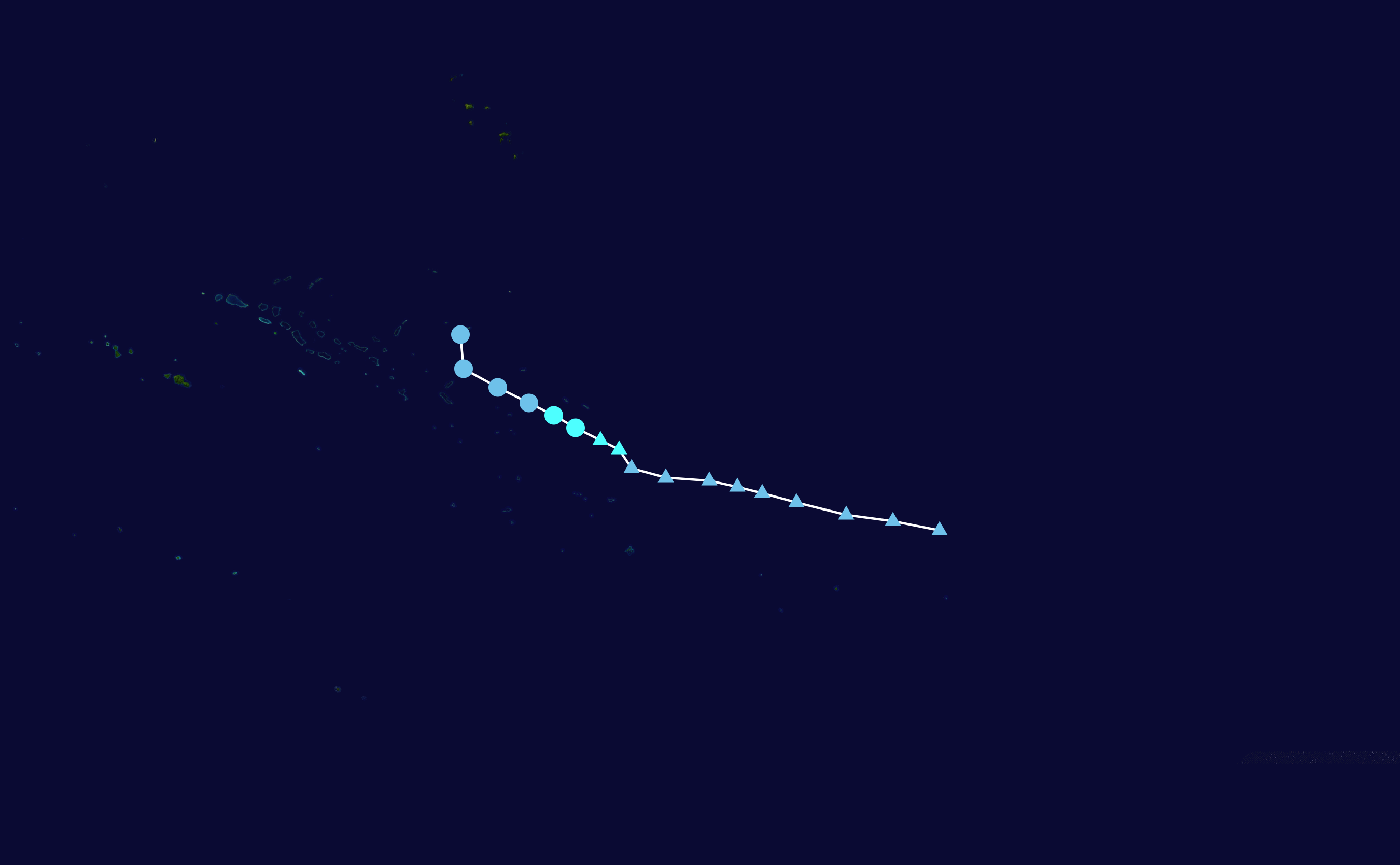
- Duration: April 28 – May 3
- Peak intensity: 85 km/h (50 mph) (10-min); 987 hPa (mbar)

On April 27, a tropical disturbance developed within the South Pacific Convergence Zone near the French Polynesian atolls of Takaroa, Hao and Puka-Puka. Over the next couple of days, the system moved eastwards and gradually developed further, with nearby automatic weather stations reporting strong winds and significant pressure drops. On April 29, the depression was named Bart by the FMS after it had developed into a Category 1 tropical cyclone on the Australian scale near the island of Hao. The FMS reported during the next day that Bart had reached its peak 10-minute sustained windspeeds of 85 km/h (50 mph), as the system slowed down due to a blocking ridge of high pressure strengthening.

The NPMOC subsequently initiated advisories on Bart and designated it as Tropical Cyclone 37P, while it was at its peak 1-minute sustained windspeeds of 65 km/h (40 mph). However, by this time Bart had started to weaken, before on May 1, satellite imagery showed that the systems, low level centre had become exposed as the main area of convection had become sheared. Despite gale-force wind speeds occurring in Bart's southern semicircle, the system weakened into a tropical depression during May 1, before it dissipated to the north of Pitcairn Island on May 3. Ten deaths were associated with Bart after waves from the system capsized a boat, while any damage within French Polynesia if any was minimal.

=== Other systems ===
On February 11, a tropical depression developed about 185 km (115 mi) to the northwest of the Northern Cook Island: Suwarrow Atoll. Over the next couple of days the depression moved westwards slowly before the centre was relocated late on February 13 to a position about 185 km (115 mi) to the south-southeast of Nassau Island. Over the next few days the depression remained in the same general area before the final advisory was issued on February 15. On February 28, the FMS reported that two tropical depressions had developed within the basin. The first depression developed about 555 km (345 mi) to the northwest the French Polynesian island of Tahiti, before the final warning was issued during the next day after no development had occurred. The second depression developed about 500 km (310 mi) to the southeast of Honiara on the Solomon island of Guadalcanal, over the next couple of days the depression drifted towards the southeast, before the final warning was issued on March 2.

== Season effects ==
1997–98 South Pacific cyclone season
Name	Dates active	Peak intensity			Areas affected	Damage (US$)	Deaths	Refs
Name	Dates active	Category	Wind speed	Pressure	Areas affected	Damage (US$)	Deaths	Refs
Lusi	October 8 – 12	Category 2 tropical cyclone	100 km/h (65 mph)	985 hPa (29.09 inHg)	Vanuatu, Fiji	None	None	
03P	October 26 – 28	Tropical depression	Not specified	Not specified	None	None	None	
Martin	October 27 – November 5	Category 3 severe tropical cyclone	155 km/h (100 mph)	945 hPa (27.91 inHg)	Cook Islands, French Polynesia	$8 million	28	
Nute	November 18 – 19	Category 2 tropical cyclone	110 km/h (70 mph)	975 hPa (28.79 inHg)	None	None	None	
Osea	November 22 – 28	Category 3 severe tropical cyclone	150 km/h (90 mph)	950 hPa (28.05 inHg)	French Polynesia	Minimal	1	
Pam	December 6 – 10	Category 2 tropical cyclone	110 km/h (70 mph)	975 hPa (28.79 inHg)	Cook Islands, French Polynesia	Minimal	None	
Susan	December 20, 1997 – January 9, 1998	Category 5 severe tropical cyclone	230 km/h (145 mph)	900 hPa (26.58 inHg)	Solomon Islands, Vanuatu. Fiji	$100,000	1	
Ron	January 1 – 8	Category 5 severe tropical cyclone	230 km/h (145 mph)	900 hPa (26.58 inHg)	Swains Island, Tonga,.Wallis and Futuna	Unknown	1	
Katrina	January 7 – 11	Category 3 severe tropical cyclone	150 km/h (90 mph)	950 hPa (28.05 inHg)	Solomon Islands, Vanuatu, Australia	$8.66 million	2	
Tui	January 24 – 27	Category 1 tropical cyclone	75–85 km/h (45–50 mph)	990 hPa (29.23 inHg)	Samoa, American Samoa	$850,000	1	
Ursula	January 29 – February 2	Category 2 tropical cyclone	110 km/h (70 mph)	975 hPa (28.79 inHg)	French Polynesia	Minor	None	
Veli	January 30 – February 3	Category 2 tropical cyclone	100 km/h (65 mph)	985 hPa (29.09 inHg)	French Polynesia	Minor	None	
Wes	January 31 – February 5	Category 2 tropical cyclone	100 km/h (65 mph)	985 hPa (29.09 inHg)	Cook Islands, French Polynesia	None	10	
Unnamed	February 11 – 15	Tropical depression	65 km/h (40 mph)	995 hPa (29.38 inHg)	None	None	None	
Unnamed	February 28 – March 2	Tropical depression	55 km/h (35 mph)	998 hPa (29.47 inHg)	None	None	None	
Unnamed	February 28 – March 1	Tropical depression	55 km/h (35 mph)	998 hPa (29.47 inHg)	None	None	None	
Yali	March 18 – 25	Category 3 severe tropical cyclone	130 km/h (80 mph)	965 hPa (28.50 inHg)	Solomon Islands, Vanuatu, New Caledonia, New Zealand	$6 million	1	
Zuman	March 29 – April 5	Category 3 severe tropical cyclone	150 km/h (90 mph)	955 hPa (28.20 inHg)	Vanuatu, New Caledonia	$6 million	None	
Alan	April 17 – 26	Category 1 tropical cyclone	75 km/h (45 mph)	992 hPa (29.29 inHg)	French Polynesia	Minimal	10	
Bart	April 28 – May 5	Category 1 tropical cyclone	85 km/h (50 mph)	987 hPa (29.15 inHg)	French Polynesia	Minimal	10	
Season aggregates
20 systems	October 8, 1997 – May 5, 1998		230 km/h (145 mph)	900 hPa (26.58 inHg)		$29.6 million	65	

== See also ==
- Atlantic hurricane seasons: 1997, 1998
- Pacific hurricane seasons: 1997, 1998
- Pacific typhoon seasons: 1997, 1998
- North Indian Ocean cyclone seasons: 1997, 1998
- 1997–98 South-West Indian Ocean cyclone season
- 1997–98 Australian region cyclone season
- 1982–83 South Pacific cyclone season
