= Tropical cyclones in 1997 =

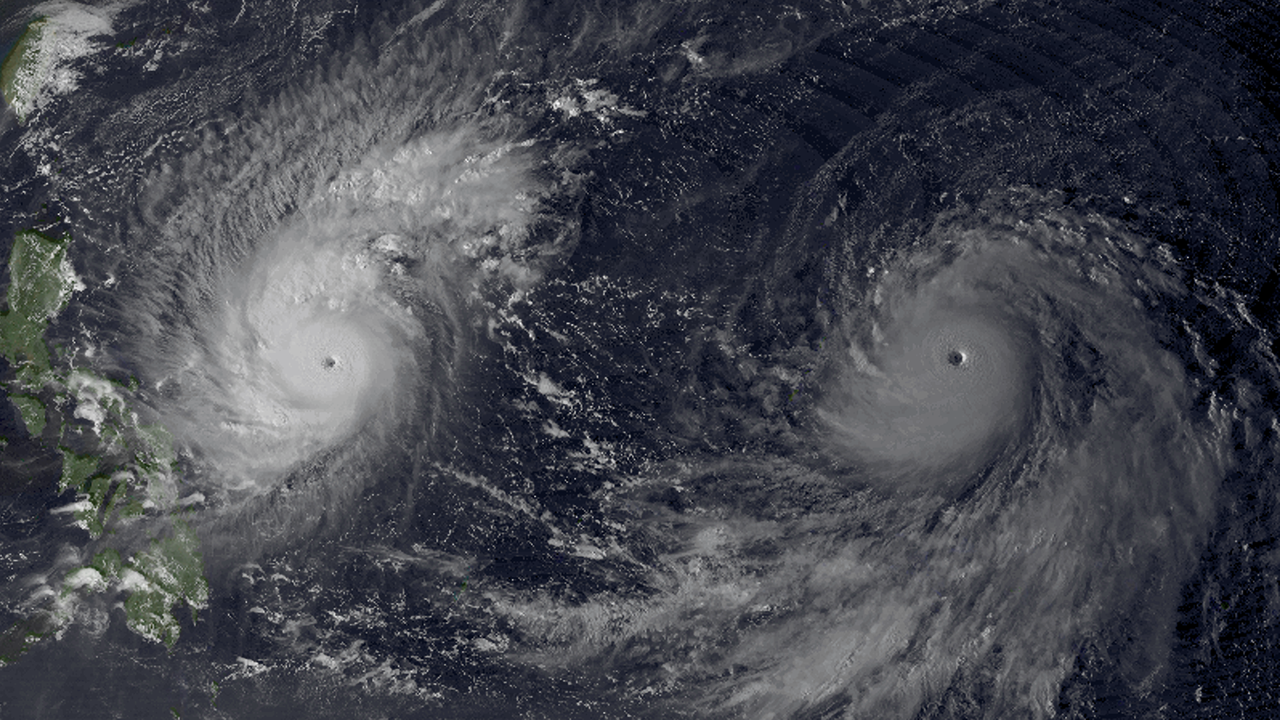
- Satellite image of two simultaneous tropical cyclones in the Northwest Pacific ocean on October 17, with typhoons Ivan (left), and Joan

Year boundaries
- First system: Fabriola
- Formed: January 2, 1997
- Last system: Susan
- Dissipated: January 8, 1998

Strongest system
- Name: Linda
- Lowest pressure: 902 mbar (hPa); 26.64 inHg

Longest lasting system
- Name: Paka
- Duration: 25 days

Year statistics
- Total systems: 125
- Named systems: 89
- Total fatalities: 5,531 total
- Total damage: ≥ $6.06 billion (1997 USD)
Related articles
- 1997 Atlantic hurricane season
- 1997 Pacific hurricane season
- 1997 Pacific typhoon season
- 1997 North Indian Ocean cyclone season
- 1996–97 South-West Indian Ocean cyclone season
- 1997–98 South-West Indian Ocean cyclone season
- 1996–97 Australian region cyclone season
- 1997–98 Australian region cyclone season
- 1996–97 South Pacific cyclone season
- 1997–98 South Pacific cyclone season

The year 1997 was regarded as one of the most intense tropical cyclone years on record, featuring a record 12 category 5-equivalent tropical cyclones, according to the Saffir–Simpson hurricane wind scale. The year also featured the second-highest amount of accumulated cyclone energy (ACE) on record, just behind 1992 and 2018. Throughout the year, 108 tropical cyclones have developed in bodies of water, commonly known as tropical cyclone basins. However, only 89 tropical cyclones were of those attaining 39 mph or greater, falling just below the long term average of 102 named systems. The most active basin was the Western Pacific, attaining an ACE amount of 571, the highest ever recorded in any season in any basin on record. The deadliest tropical cyclone was Severe Tropical Storm Linda (Openg). The costliest tropical cyclone was Super Typhoon Winnie (Ibiang), which set a record for having the largest eye on record. The most intense tropical cyclone was Hurricane Linda, peaking at 902 hPa/mbar. Typhoon Paka (Rubing), the longest-lived system, produced the fourth-highest ACE for a single tropical cyclone, just behind Typhoon Nancy (1961), Hurricane/Typhoon Ioke (2006), and Cyclone Freddy (2023). The accumulated cyclone energy (ACE) index for the 1997 (seven basins combined), as calculated by Colorado State University was 1,099.2 units.

Tropical cyclones are primarily monitored by a group of ten warning centres, which have been designated as a Regional Specialized Meteorological Center (RSMC) or a Tropical Cyclone Warning Center (TCWC) by the World Meteorological Organization. These are the United States National Hurricane Center (NHC) and Central Pacific Hurricane Center, the Japan Meteorological Agency (JMA), the India Meteorological Department (IMD), Météo-France, Indonesia's Badan Meteorologi, Klimatologi, dan Geofisika, the Australian Bureau of Meteorology (BOM), Papua New Guinea's National Weather Service, the Fiji Meteorological Service (FMS) as well as New Zealand's MetService. Other notable warning centres include the Philippine Atmospheric, Geophysical and Astronomical Services Administration (PAGASA), the United States Joint Typhoon Warning Center (JTWC), and the Brazilian Navy Hydrographic Center.

== Global conditions ==
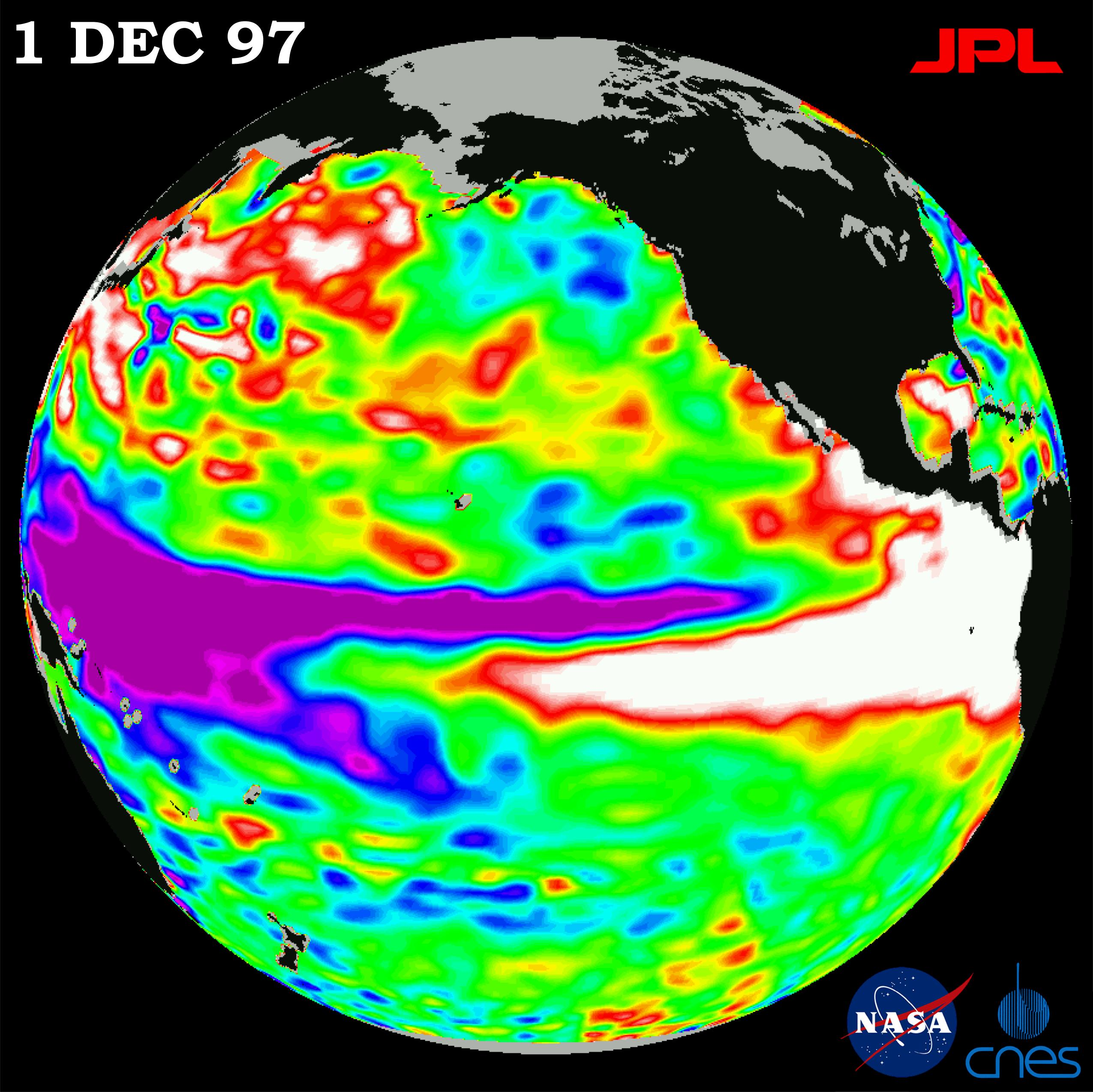
The 1997 El Niño observed by TOPEX/Poseidon. The white areas off the tropical coasts of South and North America indicate the pool of warm water

In January 1997, satellites gathering information on water temperatures and sea level heights discovered an area of unusually warm water situated across the western half of the Pacific Ocean. About 150 m (490 ft) below the surface, water temperatures were about 3 °C (5.4 °F) above normal, signifying that an El Niño–Southern Oscillation (ENSO) event was beginning. By this time, Scripps Institution of Oceanography had forecast that an ENSO was likely to take place during the latter half of 1997. Throughout February, water temperatures began increasing over much of the Pacific as well as in shallower waters off the coast of Peru. The above-average water temperatures covered an area roughly 11,000 km (6,800 mi) across, almost stretching from New Guinea to South America. By April, the ENSO became fully established; a column of warm water extended to the surface in the middle of the Pacific Ocean and water anomalies exceeded 5 °C (9 °F) about 150 m (490 ft) below the ocean surface. At the surface off the coast of Peru, water temperatures averaged 3 °C (5.4 °F) above normal.

Exceedingly warm waters became apparent by May, especially off the coast of South America where anomalies were reaching 7 °C (12.6 °F) above normal. Further north, sea surface temperatures along the Pacific coast of North America were increasing, with a large pool of water being 3 °C (5.4 °F) above normal. By September 1997, the ENSO became very powerful, with surface temperatures between South America and the International Date Line averaging 2–4 °C (3.6–7.2 °F) above normal, roughly a quarter of the planet's diameter. Additionally, waters along the Pacific coast of North America continued to expand, now stretching from Alaska to southern Mexico. A contrasting area of abnormally cool waters took shape near the coast of Australia by September as well, with waters 150 m (490 ft) below the surface averaging 4 °C (7.2 °F) below normal. Along the Pacific coast of the Americas, the volume of 21 to 30 °C (70 to 86 °F) water was roughly 30 times greater than that of all the water in the Great Lakes combined. The extra heat energy created by this anomaly was also about 93 times more than the energy produced by fossil fuels in the United States during 1995.

== Summary ==
=== North Atlantic Ocean ===
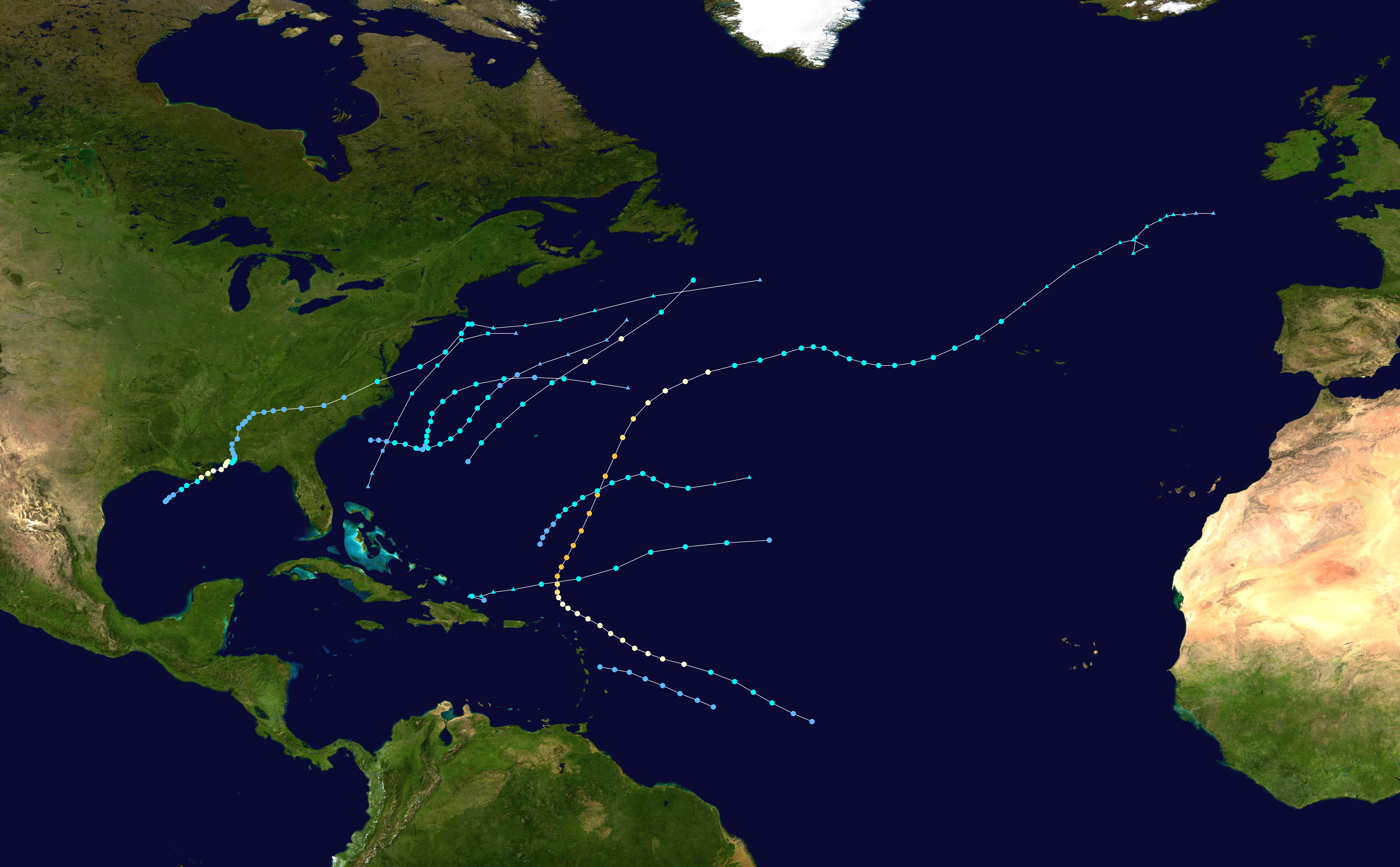
1997 Atlantic hurricane season summary map

The Atlantic hurricane season officially began on June 1, and an unnamed subtropical storm developed on the same day. Only nine tropical depressions formed. Eight of the depressions attained tropical storm status, making 1997 the least active Atlantic hurricane season in the ongoing above-average era of tropical cyclogenesis, which began in 1995. Just three of these systems attained hurricane status and only one tropical cyclone intensified into a major hurricane, which was below the 1981–2010 average of three per season. Only Danny made landfall at hurricane strength during the season, although Hurricane Erika and Tropical Storm Grace also caused damage and fatalities. Those three cyclones collectively caused 12 deaths and $111.46 million in damage. The last storm of the season, Tropical Storm Grace, dissipated on October 17, over a month before the official end of the season on November 30.

The 1997 Atlantic hurricane season had a very active beginning. In June, two tropical cyclones developed – the unnoticed subtropical storm and Tropical Storm Ana. An unusual four tropical cyclones formed in the month of July, three of which reached tropical storm intensity, and two of them became hurricanes. Despite the active start, the other months of the season featured record low activity, especially in August and September, both of which combined produced only one tropical cyclone. As a result of the active start and subsequent lack of activity, it showed that early season activity has no correlation to the entire season. Further, this marked the first occurrence of no tropical cyclogenesis in August since 1961, and the most recent instance of no activity in that month until 2022. The lone tropical cyclone during the period was Hurricane Erika, which developed on September 3. In October, two short-lived tropical cyclones developed, Fabian and Grace. Tropical cyclogenesis ceased after Grace transitioned into an extratropical cyclone on October 17. The season's activity was reflected with a low accumulated cyclone energy (ACE) rating of 41. ACE is, broadly speaking, a measure of the power of the hurricane multiplied by the length of time it existed, so storms that last a long time, as well as particularly strong hurricanes, have high ACEs. It is only calculated for full advisories on tropical systems at or exceeding 39 mph (63 km/h), which is the threshold for tropical storm strength.

=== Eastern & Central Pacific Oceans ===
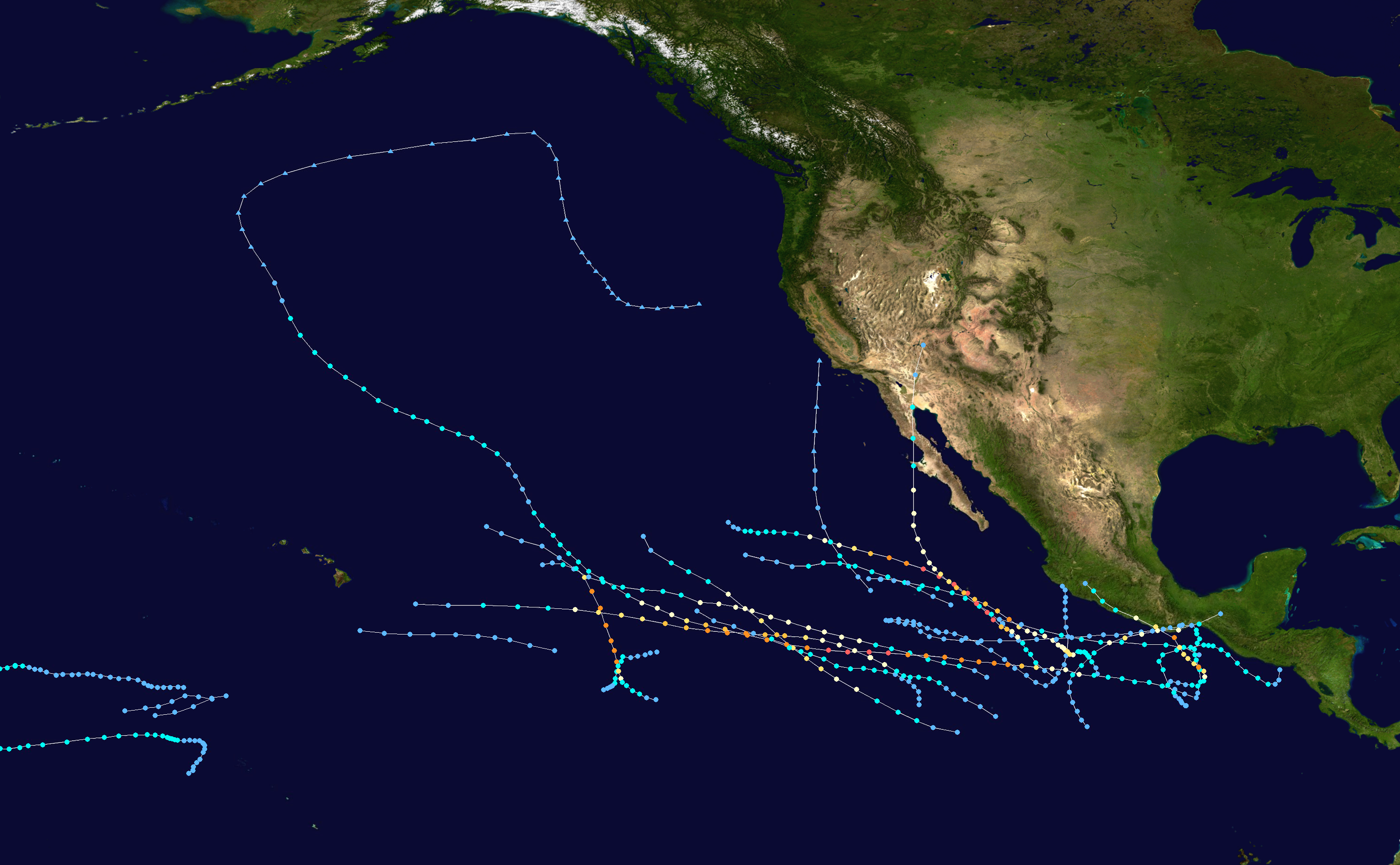
1997 Pacific hurricane season summary map

It was a very active hurricane season. With hundreds of deaths and hundreds of millions of dollars in damage, this was one of the deadliest and costliest Pacific hurricane seasons on record. The season produced 17 named storms, which was a little above normal. The average number of named storms per year is 15. The 1997 season also had 9 hurricanes, compared to the average of 8. There were also 7 major hurricanes compared to the average of 4. This was due to the exceptionally strong ongoing El Niño event. Several storms impacted land. The first was Tropical Storm Andres which killed four people and left another two missing. In August, Tropical Storm Ignacio took an unusual path through the basin, resulting in its extratropical remnants causing minimal damage throughout the Pacific Northwest and California. Linda became the most intense east Pacific hurricane in recorded history, a record it maintained until it was surpassed by Hurricane Patricia in 2015. Although it never made landfall, it produced large surf in Southern California and as a result, five people had to be rescued. Hurricane Nora caused flooding and damage in the Southwestern United States, while Olaf made two landfalls and caused eighteen deaths and several other people were reported missing. Hurricane Pauline killed several hundred people and caused record damage in southeastern Mexico. In addition, Super Typhoons Oliwa and Paka originated in the region before crossing the International Date Line and causing significant damage in the western Pacific. There were also two Category 5 hurricanes: Linda and Guillermo. The National Hurricane Center uses accumulated cyclone energy (ACE) to rank hurricane seasons as above-normal, near-normal, and below-normal. The total ACE of this season is 160*10^{4} kt^{2} in the east Pacific proper, which qualifies this season as above-normal.

=== Western Pacific Ocean ===
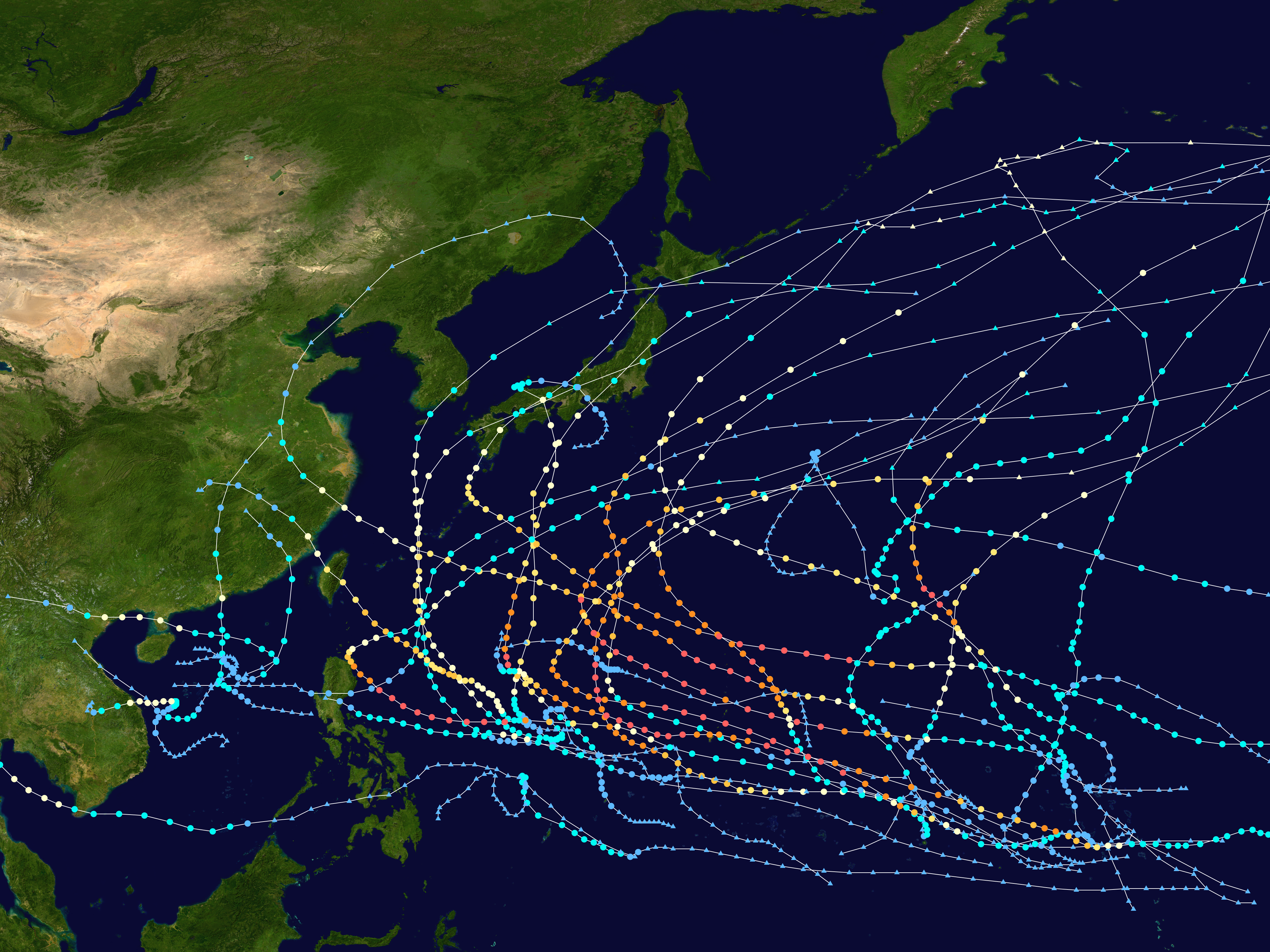
1997 Pacific hurricane season summary map

It was a record-breaking season featuring eleven tropical cyclones reaching super typhoon intensity, tying the record with 1965 with the most violent tropical cyclones globally, and was the ninth and last consecutive year of above-average tropical cyclone activity that started in 1989. Its extremely high activity produced a total of 570 ACE index, which is the highest ever index recorded in a single tropical cyclone season. In addition, this season had ten Saffir-Simpson Category 5-equivalent tropical cyclones, the most ever recorded, even greater than the 2005 Atlantic hurricane season, which had nearly half of the amount. The 1997–98 El Niño event was a contributing factor to this unusually high activity. Despite this, the season produced an average number of tropical storms, spawning twenty-nine tropical storms. The first named storm, Hannah, developed on January 20 while the last named storm, Paka, dissipated on December 23. Tropical Storm Linda became the worst tropical cyclone to hit Vietnam, killing over 3,000 people

=== North Indian Ocean ===
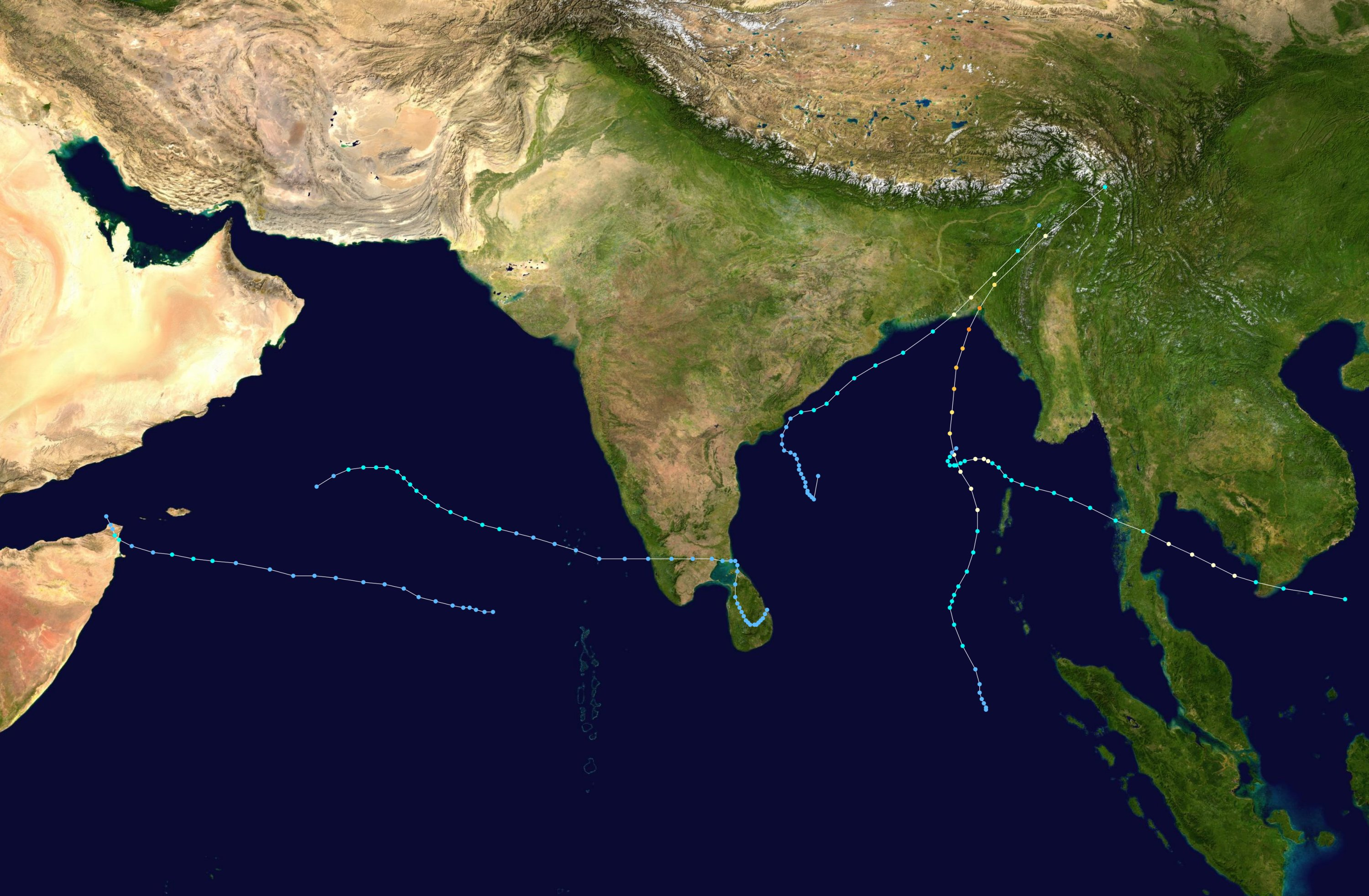
1997 North Indian Ocean cyclone season summary map

On May 13, a near-equatorial trough developed. The poorly organized system slowly tracked towards the north-northwest. The following day, deep convection consolidated around the center of circulation and the Joint Typhoon Warning Center (JTWC) classified the system as Tropical Cyclone 01B. Favorable upper-level conditions and good outflow allowed the storm to intensify. Shortly after, the cyclone attained tropical storm-force winds and turned towards the northeast. While gradually increasing in forward motion, the storm continued to strengthen. On May 17, the cyclone attained winds of 120 km/h (75 km/h), equivalent to a Category 1 hurricane on the Saffir–Simpson scale. By May 18 an eye developed and the storm reached its peak intensity with winds of 215 km/h (135 mph) before making landfall near Chittagong. After landfall, the storm rapidly tracked northeastward inland and dissipated early on May 20. It caused significant damage and 67 fatalities. On September 19, a tropical depression formed from an area of disturbed weather in the western Bay of Bengal. It drifted northwestward towards the Indian coastline, but a mid-latitude trough pulled it northeastward, The depression strengthened to a tropical storm on the 24th, and it reached cyclone strength while paralleling the Indian coastline on 26th. It made landfall in Bangladesh on the 27th, and dissipated shortly thereafter. Tropical Cyclone 2B was responsible for 51 fatalities and left an additional 137 people missing.

Typhoon Linda killed 30 while crossing the Malay Peninsula, emerged into the Bay of Bengal on November 4. It continued westward, reaching cyclone strength again, but vertical shear caused it to dissipate on the 9th. In southern Thailand, 30 people were killed and 102 others were listed as missing as a result of the storm. Linda damaged at least 100 homes and sank 30 ships in the region. An estimated 6,400,000 m^{2} of farmland were destroyed by Linda. A broad trough of low pressure formed into a tropical depression on November 4 in the central Arabian Sea. It moved westward, slowly intensifying into a tropical storm on the 8th. Vertical shear weakened it to a depression later that day, but on the 9th, just before making landfall on eastern Somalia, it restrengthened to a tropical storm. Tropical Storm Three dissipated on the 10th without causing any reported damage.

=== South-West Indian Ocean ===
==== January–June ====
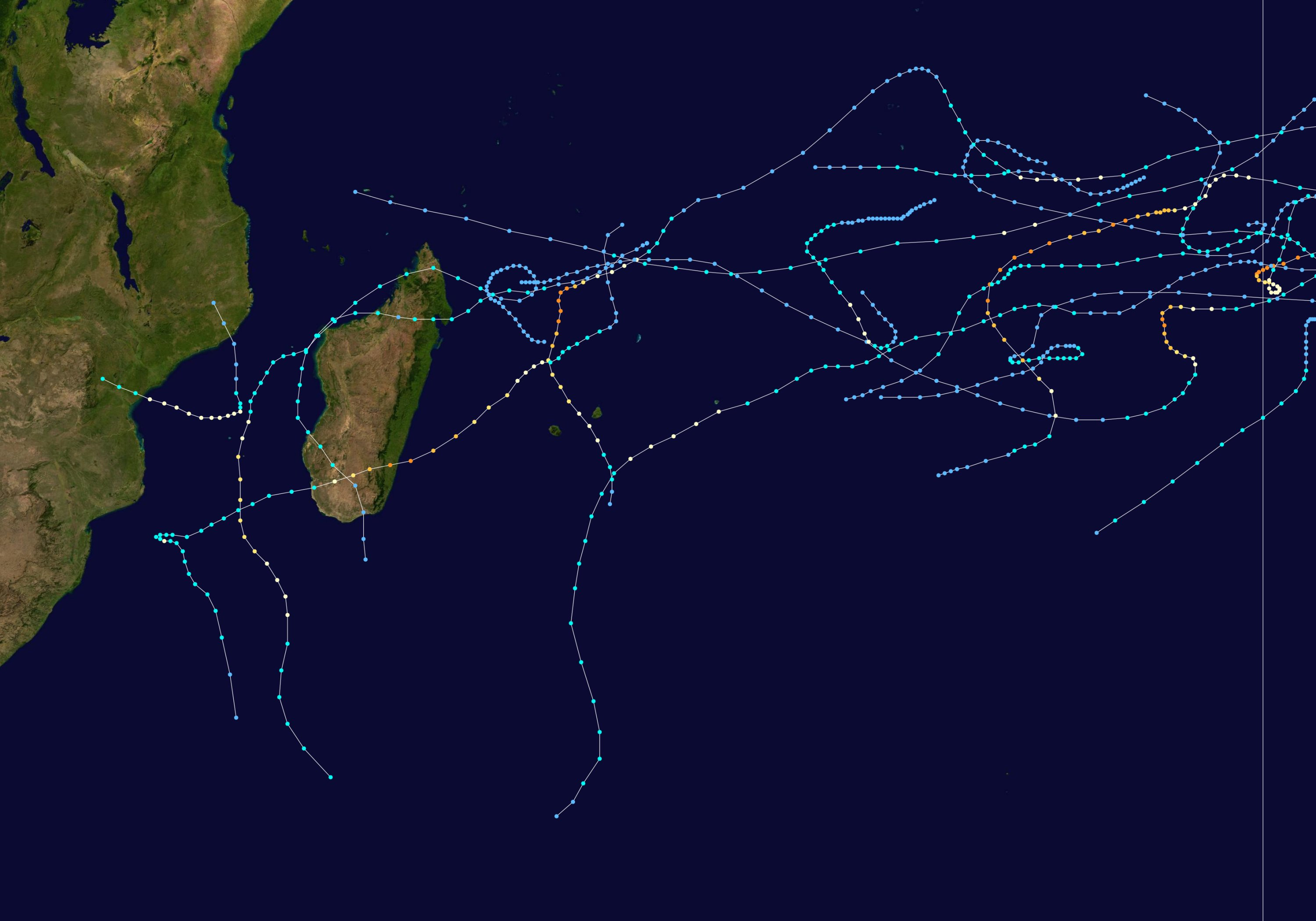
1996–97 South-West Indian Ocean cyclone season

It was the longest on record, with both an unusually early start and unusually late ending. Most activity was from November through February. According to the Météo-France office (MFR) at Réunion, there were 21 tropical disturbances, 14 of which intensified into tropical depressions. There were 12 named storms, beginning with Antoinette and proceeding sequentially until Lisette. In addition, the Joint Typhoon Warning Center also warned on storms in the region, which identified five other tropical storms. Five of the storms attained tropical cyclone status, or with 10–minute maximum sustained winds of at least 120 km/h (75 mph); of these, three strengthened further into intense tropical cyclones, with Daniella and Helinda tied for strongest storm of the season.

In August, a tropical depression developed in the south-west Indian Ocean for the first time 27 years, and a month later, a rare September tropical disturbance formed. The first named storm, Antoinette, was the first of several to originate in the neighboring Australian basin, or east of 90° E; the subsequent two named storms also formed in the Australian region. In early December, Cyclone Daniella likely developed out of the remnants of previous Tropical Storm Chantelle. After reaching peak 10–minute winds of 185 km/h (115 mph), Daniella weakened and passed just southwest of Mauritius; there, the storm left heavy crop damage and indirectly caused three deaths. In early January, Tropical Storm Fabriola was the first in a succession of three storms to move over Madagascar. The next – Cyclone Gretelle – killed 152 people when it struck southeastern Madagascar. Between January and February, Cyclone Pancho-Helinda lasted about 20 days between both the Australian and south-west Indian basins. Also in February, Tropical Storm Josie killed 36 people in western Madagascar after causing severe flooding. The final named storm was Tropical Storm Lisette, which dissipated on March 3 after striking Mozambique, killing three people. Despite the early end to the named storms, there were two additional disturbances, one of which became the first July tropical depression in 25 years.

==== July–December ====
No storms or tropical depressions had formed during July and December 1997.

== Systems ==
=== January ===
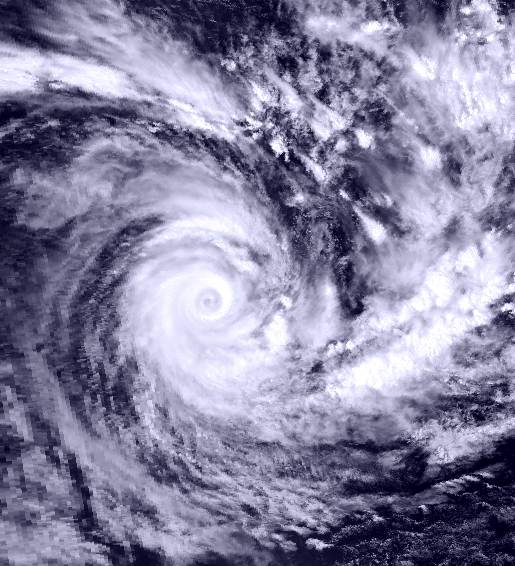
Cyclone Drena

In January, the Intertropical Convergence Zone (ITCZ), which allows for the formation of tropical waves, is located in the Southern Hemisphere, remaining there until May. This limits Northern Hemisphere cyclone formation to comparatively rare non-tropical sources. In addition, the month's climate is also an important factor. In the Southern Hemisphere basins, January, at the height of the austral summer, is the most active month by cumulative number of storms since records began. Of the four Northern Hemisphere basins, none is very active in January, as the month is during the winter, but the most active basin is the Western Pacific, which occasionally sees weak tropical storms form during the month. January was unusually active, being the most active month since official records began with ten tropical cyclones formed, all of them were named..

The month began with the formation of Severe Tropical Storm Fabriola in the South-West Indian Ocean on January 2. Fabriola made landfall in Madagascar twice, causing heavy rains and flooding; the number of deaths and the damage caused by the storm are unknown. Severe Tropical Cyclone Rachel in the Australian region caused heavy rainfall between the Northern Territory and Western Australia. Severe Tropical Cyclone Pancho-Helinda became the strongest of the month, with maximum 10-minute winds of 215 km/h (130 mph) and a minimum pressure of 915 mbar. Tropical Depression Hanna (which was operationally assigned as a tropical storm before re-analysis) in the western Pacific Ocean formed on January 19 without affecting land. Cyclone Gretelle caused damage in Madagascar, killing 152 people and causing $50.1 million (USD) in damage. The month ended with the formation of Tropical Storm Freda in the South Pacific Ocean on January 26.

Tropical cyclones formed in January 1997
Storm name	Dates active	Max wind km/h (mph)	Pressure (hPa)	Areas affected	Damage (USD)	Deaths	Refs
Fabriola	January 2–9	100 (65)	985	Madagascar	Unknown	None	
Rachel	January 2–10	130 (80)	965	Northern Territory, Western Australia	Minor	None	
Drena	January 2–13	220 (140)	935	Solomon Islands, Vanuatu, New Caledonia, Norfolk Island, New Zealand	$6.7 million	3	
18S	January 8–13	95 (60)	992	None	None	None	
Evan	January 10–16	130 (80)	965	Fiji, Tonga	None	None	
Pancho–Helinda	January 18–February 7	215 (130)	915	Cocos Islands	None	None	
Hannah (Atring)	January 19–24	55 (35)	1002	Caroline Islands	None	None	
Gretelle	January 19–31	140 (85)	950	Réunion, Madagascar, Mozambique	$50.05 million	152	
Iletta	January 24–30	100 (65)	975	None	None	None	
Freda	January 26–February 2	110 (70)	980	None	Unknown	Unknown	

=== February ===
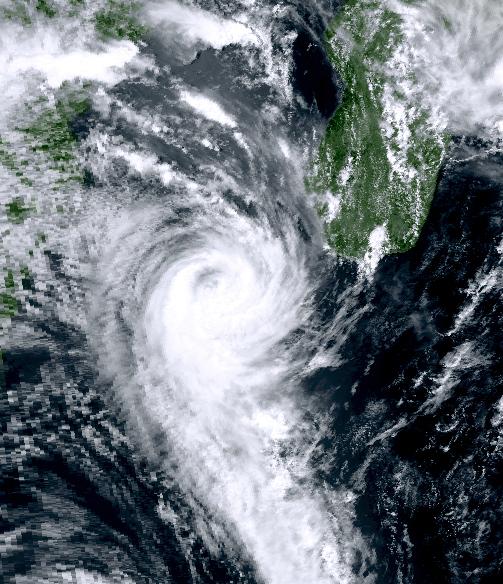
Cyclone Josie

In terms of activity, February is normally similar to January, with activity effectively restricted to the Southern Hemisphere excepting the rare Western Pacific storm. In fact, in the Southern Hemisphere, due to the monsoon being at its height, February tends to see more formation of strong tropical cyclones than January despite seeing marginally fewer overall storms. In the Northern Hemisphere, February is the least active month, with no Eastern or Central Pacific tropical cyclones and only one Atlantic tropical cyclone having ever formed in the month. Even in the Western Pacific, February activity is low: in 1997, the month had never seen any typhoon-strength storms, with the first being 2015's Typhoon Higos.

The month saw a high number of tropical cyclones – eight – although most failed to develop past depression intensity, with only six being named. The first cyclone of the month, Josie, formed on February 5. Josie caused deadly flooding in Mozambique, killing 87 people and directly affecting another 80,000. Tropical Storm Ita, off the Australian coast, made landfall in Queensland before rapidly dissipating. Tropical Storm Lisette made landfall in Mozambique as a Category 1 tropical cyclone, causing the deaths of 87 people; the extent of the damage is unknown. The month ended with the formation of Tropical Cyclone 29P on February 23.

Tropical cyclones formed in February 1997
Storm name	Dates active	Max wind km/h (mph)	Pressure (hPa)	Areas affected	Damage (USD)	Deaths	Refs
Josie	February 5–16	140 (85)	950	Madagascar, Mozambique	Unknown	36	
Gillian	February 10–12	85 (50)	995	Papua New Guinea, Queensland	None	None	
Karlette	February 14–25	110 (70)	970	Rodrigues	None	None	
Harold	February 16–24	110 (70)	975	New Caledonia	Unknown	Unknown	
TD	February 18–19	Unknown	Unknown	Fiji	Unknown	None	
Ita	February 23–24	85 (50)	994	Queensland	Minor	None	
Lisette	February 24–March 3	95 (60)	980	Mozambique	Unknown	87	
29P	February 23–27	110 (70)	975	None	None	None	

=== March ===
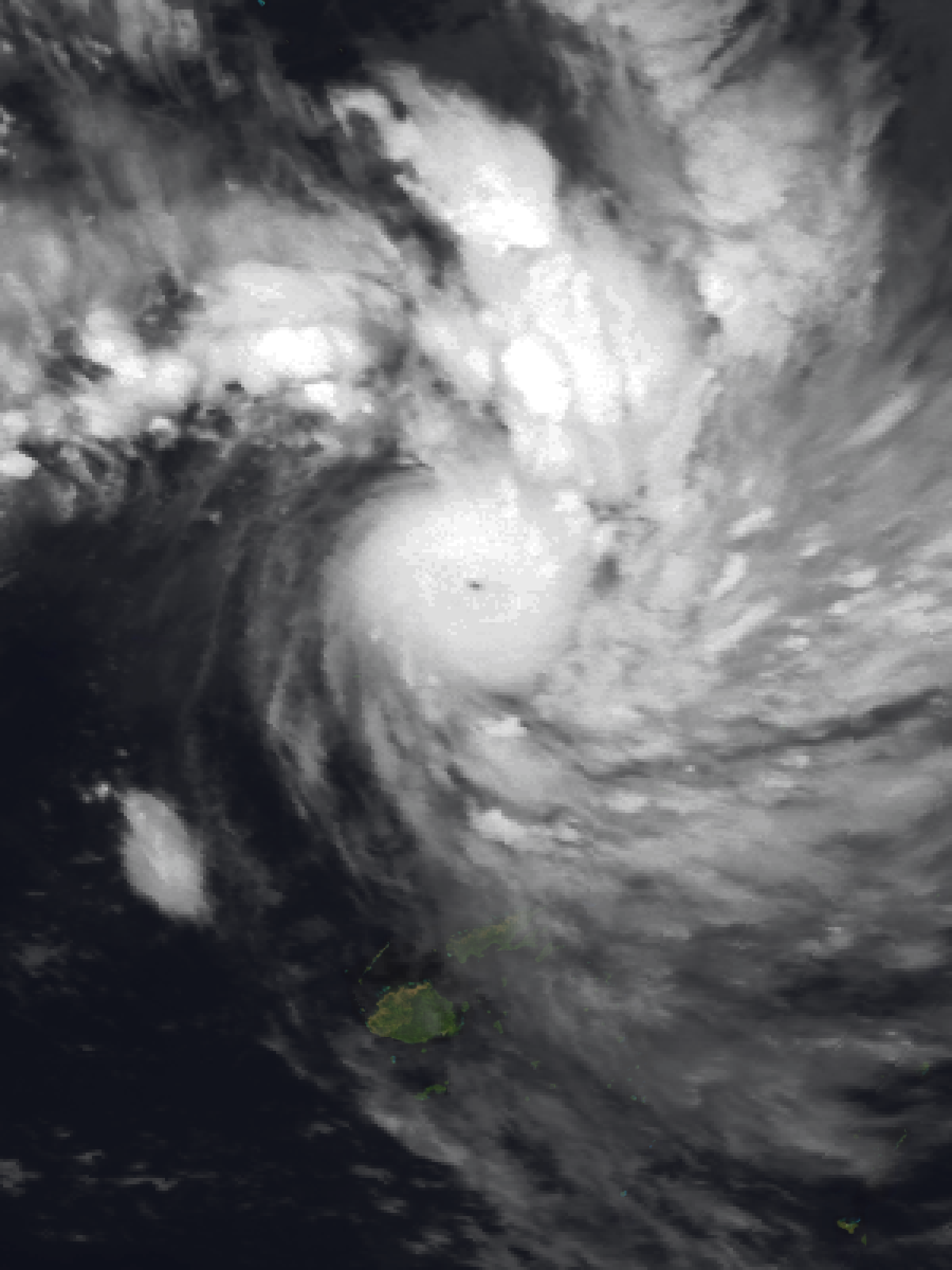
Cyclone Gavin

During March, activity tends to be lower than in preceding months. In the Southern Hemisphere, the peak of the season has normally already passed, and the monsoon has begun to weaken, decreasing cyclonic activity, however, the month often sees more intense tropical cyclones than January or February. Meanwhile, in the Northern Hemisphere basins, sea surface temperatures are still far too low to normally support tropical cyclogenesis. The exception is the Western Pacific, which usually sees its first storm, often a weak depression, at some point between January and April.

March was a well below-average month, featuring three systems. All of them have been named. The month began in the South Pacific Ocean with Cyclone Gavin, which recently affected the island nations of Tuvalu and Wallis and Futuna, killing 18 people. After Gavin dissipated, Cyclone Hina formed on 11 March, causing more than $15.2 million in damage and was indirectly responsible for one death as it affected Tuvalu, Wallis and Futuna, and Tonga. The worst impact of the system was recorded on Tongatapu and 'Eua, which are the southernmost islands of the Kingdom of Tonga. Cyclone Justin in the Australian region had a long and erratic track, causing widespread damage in Queensland and Papua New Guinea, killing 34 people in total.

Tropical cyclones formed in March 1997
Storm name	Dates active	Max wind km/h (mph)	Pressure (hPa)	Areas affected	Damage (USD)	Deaths	Refs
Gavin	March 2–10	185 (115)	925	Tuvalu, Wallis and Futuna, Fiji, New Zealand	$24.93 million	18	
Justin	March 6–24	150 (90)	955	Solomon Islands, Papua New Guinea, Queensland	$190 million	34	
Hina	March 11–19	120 (75)	970	Tuvalu, Wallis and Futuna, Tonga	Unknown	1	

=== April ===
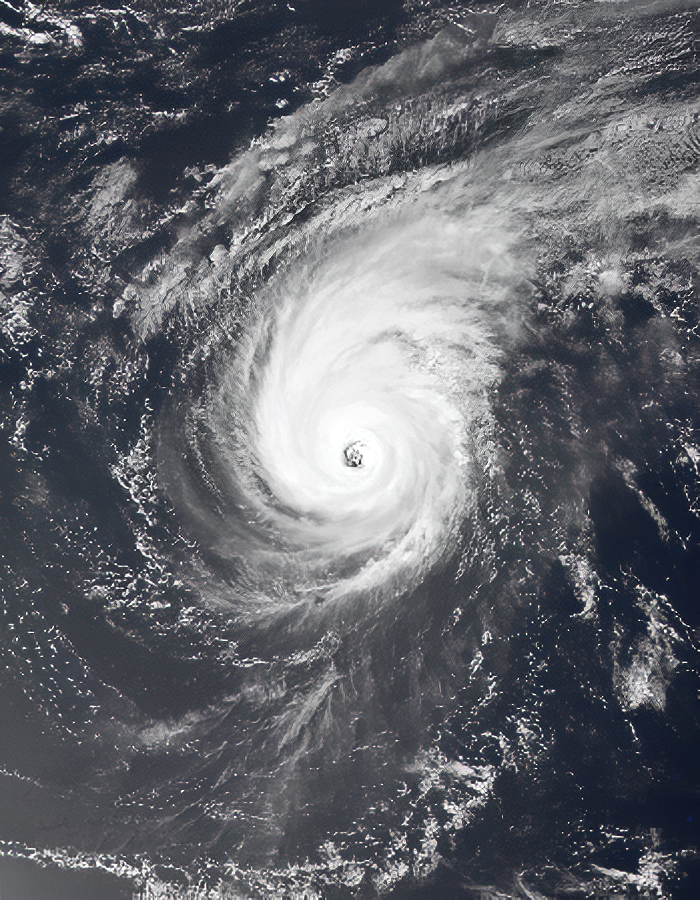
Typhoon Isa

April was also well below-average, featuring three systems. All of them have been named. Typhoon Isa in the Western Pacific Ocean, became the first of a record eleven super typhoons to occur during the basin, leaving behind $1 million.

Tropical cyclones formed in April 1997
Storm name	Dates active	Max wind km/h (mph)	Pressure (hPa)	Areas affected	Damage (USD)	Deaths	Refs
Isa	April 12–23	155 (100)	940	Pohnpei, Guam, Rota	$1 million	None	
Ian	April 13–19	85 (50)	987	Fiji	Minimal	None	
Jimmy	April 22–26	65 (40)	994	Marshall Islands, Caroline Islands	None	None	

=== May ===
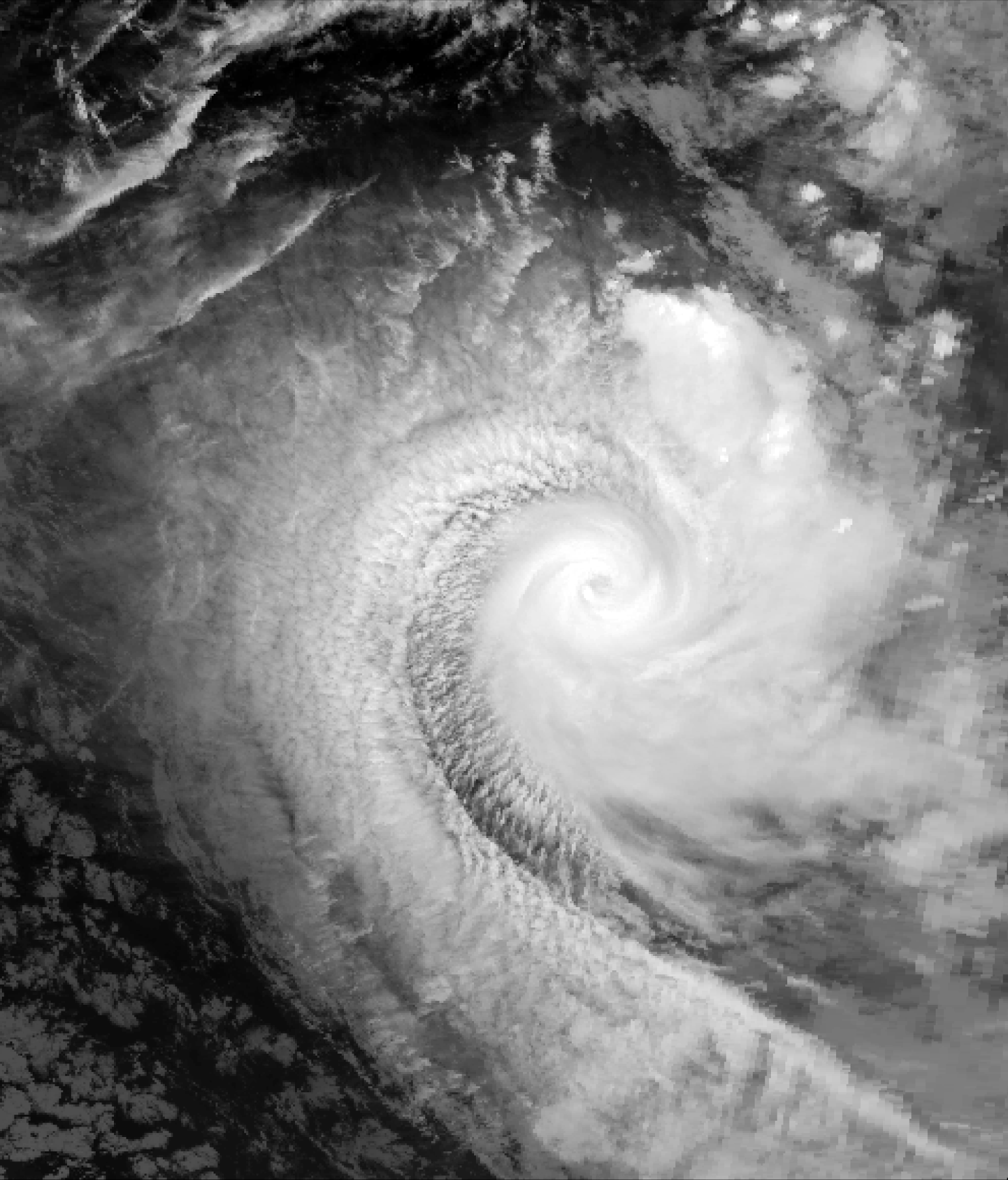
Cyclone Rhonda

Tropical cyclones formed in May 1997
Storm name	Dates active	Max wind km/h (mph)	Pressure (hPa)	Areas affected	Damage (USD)	Deaths	Refs
June	May 2–5	95 (60)	985	Fiji	$60 million	Unknown	
Kelly	May 6–10	65 (40)	998	Mariana Islands	None	None	
Rhonda	May 10–17	175 (110)	935	Cocos Island, Western Australia	Unknown	None	
BOB 01	May 14–20	185 (105)	964	Bangladesh, Myanmar, India	Unknown	332–765	
Levi	May 26–30	75 (47)	992	Philippines, Ryukyu Islands	Unknown	53	
37P	May 26–30	65 (40)	997	Vanuatu	None	None	
Marie	May 27 – June 1	120 (75)	965	Marshall Islands	None	None	

=== June ===
Tropical cyclones formed in June 1997
Storm name	Dates active	Max wind km/h (mph)	Pressure (hPa)	Areas affected	Damage (USD)	Deaths	Refs
Unnamed SS	June 1–2	50 (85)	1003	None	None	None	
Andres	June 1–7	50 (85)	998	Mexico, El Salvador, Nicaragua, Honduras	Unknown	4	
Nestor	June 5–14	185 (115)	930	Caroline Islands, Mariana Islands	None	None	
Keli	June 7–15	130 (90)	955	Tokelau, Tuvalu, Fiji, Tonga, Southern Cook Islands	$10,000	None	
Blanca	June 9–12	45 (75)	1002	Southwestern Mexico	Minimal	None	
Opal	June 14–20	140 (85)	960	Japan	None	3	

=== July ===
Tropical cyclones formed in July 1997
Storm name	Dates active	Max wind km/h (mph)	Pressure (hPa)	Areas affected	Damage (USD)	Deaths	Refs
TD	July 2–7	Unknown	1004	Caroline Islands	None	None	
Dolores	July 5–12	150 (90)	975	None	None	None	
Bill	July 11–13	120 (75)	986	Newfoundland	None	None	
TD	July 11–12	Unknown	1008	Philippines	None	None	
Enrique	July 12–16	185 (115)	960	None	None	None	
Claudette	July 13–16	75 (45)	1003	East Coast of the United States	None	None	
Felicia	July 14–22	215 (130)	948	None	None	None	
Danny	July 16–26	130 (80)	984	United States of America	$100 million	4	
Five	July 17–19	55 (35)	1008	None	None	None	
Rosie (Elang)	July 18–31	185 (115)	920	Caroline Islands, Japan	$91.7 million	5	
TD	July 18–20	Unknown	1014	Wake Island	None	None	
Scott	July 20–August 2	75 (47)	992	None	None	None	
TD	July 24–26	Unknown	1010	Caroline Islands	None	None	
TD	July 25–August 1	Unknown	1000	None	None	None	
One-C	July 26–28	55 (35)	1007	None	None	None	
Tina (Huling)	July 29–August 9	140 (87)	955	Ryukyu Islands, South Korea	None	None	
BOB 03	July 29–August 2	55 (35)	1002	Unknown	Unknown	Unknown	
Guillermo	July 30–August 15	260 (160)	919	California, Hawaiian Islands, Aleutian Islands	Unknown	3	
Victor (Goring)	July 30–August 4	110 (68)	980	China	$241 million	65	

=== August ===
Tropical cyclones formed in August 1997
Storm name	Dates active	Max wind km/h (mph)	Pressure (hPa)	Areas affected	Damage (USD)	Deaths	Refs
BOB 04	August 4–7	55 (35)	988	Unknown	Unknown	Unknown	
Winnie	August 6–20	185 (115)	915	Mariana Islands, Ryukyu Islands, Taiwan, East China	$3.2 billion	372	
Hilda	August 10–15	85 (50)	1000	None	None	None	
Yule	August 16–22	100 (68)	980	Marshall Islands	None	None	
Ignacio	August 17–19	65 (40)	1005	California, Pacific Northwest	Minimal	None	
16W	August 17–19	55 (34)	1004	None	None	None	
Zita (Luming)	August 20–24	100 (62)	980	South China	$438 million	352	
BOB 05	August 20–27	55 (35)	990	Unknown	Unknown	Unknown	
Amber (Miling)	August 21–31	150 (93)	950	Philippines, Taiwan, China	$52 million	Unknown	
TD	August 22–24	Unknown	1004	None	None	None	
Jimena	August 25–30	240 (150)	942	None	None	None	
Bing	August 26–September 4	155 (96)	940	Mariana Islands	Unknown	5	
TD	August 27	Unknown	1010	None	None	None	
Cass	August 27–30	85 (53)	992	China	None	None	
BOB 06	August 28–30	45 (30)	994	None	None	None	

=== September ===
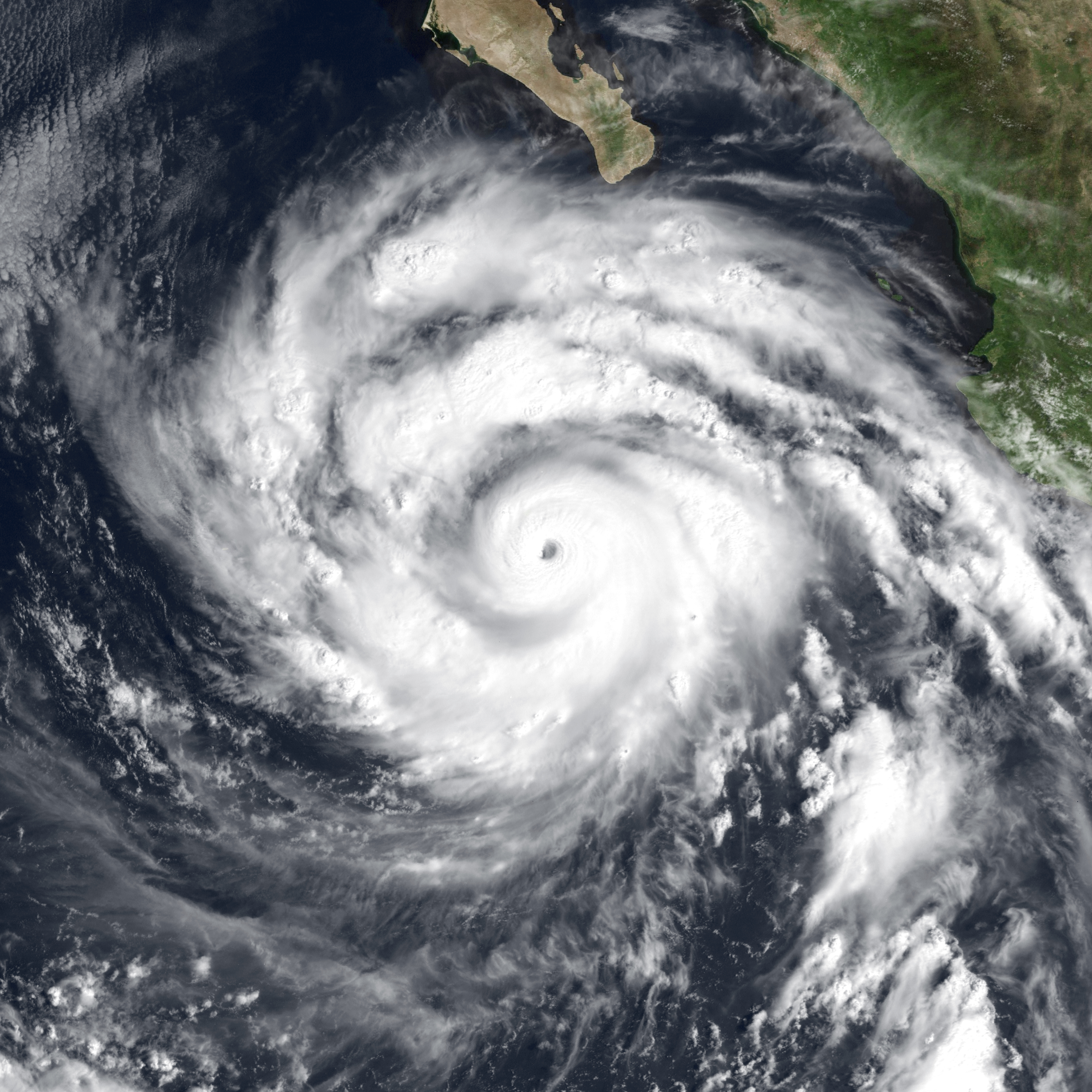
Hurricane Linda

Tropical cyclones formed in September 1997
Storm name	Dates active	Max wind km/h (mph)	Pressure (hPa)	Areas affected	Damage (USD)	Deaths	Refs
Oliwa	September 3–16	185 (115)	915	Mariana Islands, Japan, South Korea	$50.1 million	12	
Erika	September 3–20	205 (125)	946	Lesser Antilles, Azores	$10 million	2	
Kevin	September 3–7	100 (65)	994	None	None	None	
TD	September 3	Unknown	1010	Marshall Islands	None	None	
Linda	September 9–17	260 (160)	902	Mexico, Southwestern United States	$3.2 million	None	
David	September 11–19	155 (96)	945	Marshall Islands, Japan	None	None	
Marty	September 12–16	75 (45)	1002	None	None	None	
Nora	September 16–26	215 (130)	950	Mexico, Southwestern United States	$100 million	6	
BOB 07	September 19–27	100 (65)	994	Bangladesh	Unknown	51	
Ella	September 20–24	65 (40)	1002	Caroline Islands	None	None	
Fritz	September 21–27	100 (62)	980	Vietnam, Cambodia, Laos	$5.1 million	28	
Ginger	September 23–30	175 (109)	925	Marshall Islands	None	None	
Olaf	September 26–October 12	110 (70)	989	Mexico, Central America, El Salvador, Guatemala	Unknown	18	
Hank	September 28–October 4	65 (40)	1004	Vietnam	None	None	

=== October ===
Tropical cyclones formed in October 1997
Storm name	Dates active	Max wind km/h (mph)	Pressure (hPa)	Areas affected	Damage (USD)	Deaths	Refs
26W	October 2−8	55 (35)	1008	Mariana Islands	None	None	
Fabian	October 4–8	65 (40)	1004	Lesser Antilles	None	None	
Pauline	October 5–10	215 (130)	948	Southern Guerrero, Oaxaca	$448 million	230–500	
Three-C	October 6–7	45 (30)	1008	Hawaiian Islands	None	None	
Lusi	October 8–12	100 (65)	985	Vanuatu, Fiji	None	None	
Ivan	October 13–25	195 (120)	905	Marshall Islands, Guam, Philippines	$9.6 million	14	
Joan	October 13–24	195 (120)	905	Marshal Islands, Guam	$200,000	1	
Grace	October 16–17	75 (45)	999	United States Virgin Islands, Puerto Rico, Hispaniola	$1.46 million	1	
Keith	October 26–November 8	205 (125)	915	Japan, Northern Mariana Islands, Guam	$15 million	1	
03P	October 26–28	65 (40)	1008	None	None	None	
TD	October 27–29	Unknown	1008	Philippines	None	None	
Martin	October 27–November 5	155 (100)	945	Cook Islands, French Polynesia	$8 million	28	
Four-C	October 30–31	55 (35)	1012	None	None	None	
Linda (Openg)	October 31–November 3	95 (59)	985	Vietnam, Thailand	$385 million	3,123	

=== November ===
Tropical cyclones formed in November 1997
Storm name	Dates active	Max wind km/h (mph)	Pressure (hPa)	Areas affected	Damage (USD)	Deaths	Refs
ARB 01	November 2–14	55 (35)	1005	Sri Lanka	Unknown	None	
03A	November 4–10	65 (40)	Unknown	Somalia	Unknown	None	
Rick	November 7–10	155 (100)	973	Mexico, Central America, Yucatan Peninsula	Minimal	None	
Mort (Pining)	November 9–16	83 (53)	992	Caroline Islands, Philippines	None	None	
TD	November 11	Unknown	1016	None	None	None	
Nute	November 18–21	110 (75)	975	Unknown	None	None	
Osea	November 22–28	150 (90)	950	French Polynesia	None	None	
Paka	November 28–December 23	185 (115)	920	Marshall Islands, Mariana Islands	$580 million	None	

=== December ===
Tropical cyclones formed in December 1997
Storm name	Dates active	Max wind km/h (mph)	Pressure (hPa)	Areas affected	Damage (USD)	Deaths	Refs
Pam	December 6–10	110 (70)	975	Cook Islands, French Polynesia	Minimal	None	
Susan	December 20–January 9	230 (145)	900	Solomon Islands, Vanuatu, Fiji	$100,000	1	
Sid	December 24–29	85 (50)	985	Northern Territory	$100 million	1	
Selwyn	December 26–January 2	140 (85)	960	None	None	None	

== Global effects ==
There are a total of nine tropical cyclone basins, seven are seasonal and two are non-seasonal, thus all eight basins except the Mediterranean are active. In this table, data from all these basins are added.

Season name		Areas affected	Systems formed	Named storms	Hurricane-force tropical cyclones	'Damage (1997 USD)	Deaths	Ref
North Atlantic Ocean (Note: The wind speeds for this tropical cyclone/basin are based on the Saffir Simpson Scale which uses 1-minute sustained winds.)		Newfoundland, East Coast of the United States, Gulf Coast of the United States, Southeastern United States, Mid-Atlantic states, New England, Lesser Antilles, Azores, Greater Antilles	9	8	3	$111.46 million	7 (5)	
Eastern and Central Pacific Ocean		Central America, Southwestern Mexico, Southwestern United States, Hawaiian Islands, Aleutian Islands, Pacific Northwest, Western Mexico, Yucatan Peninsula	24	19	9	$451 million	531	
Western Pacific Ocean (Note: Only systems that formed either before or on December 31, 1997 are counted in the seasonal totals.)		Caroline Islands, Mariana Islands, Marshall Islands, Philippines, Ryukyu Islands, Japan, Mariana Islands, Wake Island, Taiwan, East China, Northern Mariana Islands, Korean Peninsula, Russian Far East, South China, Vietnam, Cambodia, Laos, Thailand	45	27	23	$5.073 billion	4,159	
North Indian Ocean (Note: The wind speeds for this tropical cyclone/basin are based on the IMD Scale which uses 3-minute sustained winds.)		Bangladesh, Myanmar, India, Somalia	9	3	2	Unknown	413	
South-West Indian Ocean	January – June (Note: Only systems that formed either on or after January 1, 1997 are counted in the seasonal totals.) (Note: The wind speeds for this tropical cyclone are based on Météo-France, which uses wind gusts.)	Réunion, Madagascar, Mozambique	7	6	5	Unknown	326	
South-West Indian Ocean	July – December	—N/a	—N/a	—N/a	—N/a	—N/a	—N/a	
Australian region	January – June	Christmas Island, Western Australia, Queensland, Cape York, Northern Territory, South Australia	12	9	5	$190 million	34	
Australian region	July – December	Northern Territory, Queensland	2	2	1	$100 million	1	—N/a
South Pacific Ocean	January – June	Vanuatu, New Caledonia, New Zealand, Fiji, Tonga, Melanesia, Tuvalu, Wallis and Futuna, Tokelau, Southern Cook Islands	10	9	7	$127.93 million	26	
South Pacific Ocean	July – December	Vanuatu, Fiji, Cook Islands, French Polynesia,	7	6	4	$8 million	29	
Worldwide		(See above)	125 (Note: The sum of the number of systems in each basin will not equal the number shown as the total. This is because when systems move between basins, it creates a discrepancy in the actual number of systems.)	89	59	$6.06 billion	5,526 (5) (Note: The number in the bracket indicates indirect deaths.)	

== See also ==
- Tropical cyclones by year
- List of earthquakes in 1997
- Tornadoes of 1997
