= Adana Mam-Legros =

Cambodian activist and artist

Adana Mam-Legros is a Cambodian artist and activist. Known for combining philanthropy and art, she is the co-founder and president of Generation C, a socially-driven artistic movement.

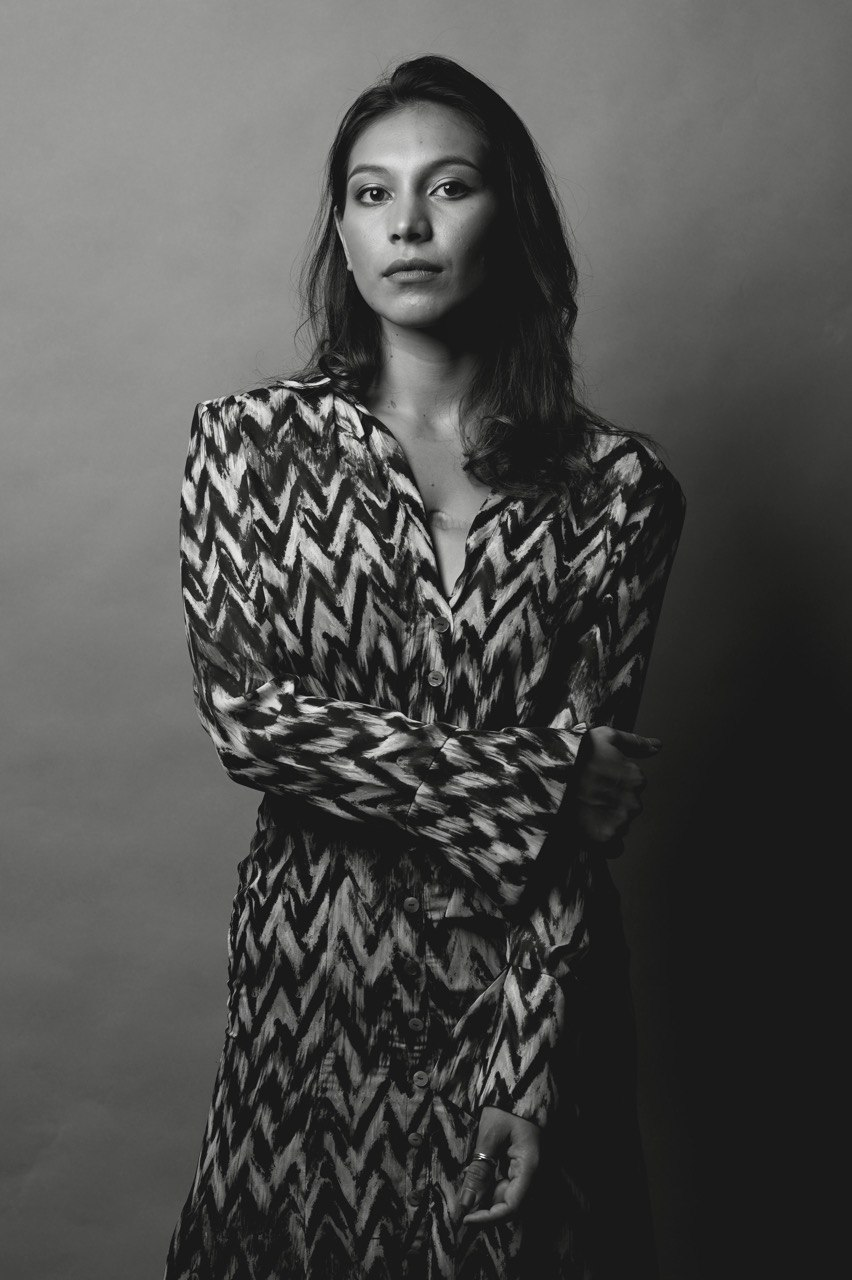
Adana Mam-Legros

== Early life ==
Mam-Legros is the daughter of Somaly Mam, a Cambodian anti-trafficking advocate focused primarily on sex trafficking, and Pierre Legros, a French-trained medical scientist engaged in humanitarian relief operations and entrepreneurship.

At the age of 21 Mam-Legros was diagnosed with cancer. After six months of chemotherapy the cancer was in remission.

== Career ==
=== Art ===
Mam-Legros's first exhibition (New York, US – 2018) was dedicated to ending a heavy chapter of her battle with cancer. In 2021, a collaborative exhibition with the Director of the National Bank of Cambodia raised US$60 000 that were donated to various local NGOs. Also in 2021, she had her curatorial debut with the exhibition "I'll show you who I am", highlighting the invisible pressure women face in Cambodia and the opportunities to overcome it – a project integrated with a women's rights campaign under the 'Voices for Gender Equality program sponsored by the European Union and DanchurchAid. She was selected to moderated a panel of discussion organized by the AFD in Cambodia (Agence Française de Development) on the topic of "Gender inequalities within higher education and workplace".

=== Generation C ===
Mam-Legros is the president and co-founder of Generation C Cambodia and France, a socially driven artistic movement striving for a paradigm shift towards a more empathic civilization, promoting emotional intelligence, ethics, and responsibility. It has the goal to transform consumers into aware global citizens through artistic activism, using the power of emotional expression from art, and the strategic planning from activism, to promote behavior change and awareness-raising on the evolution of the human species.

== Awards ==
Mam-Legros was shortlisted for the Women of the Future Awards South East Asia in the category of Art and Culture.
