= Rudelmar Bueno de Faria =

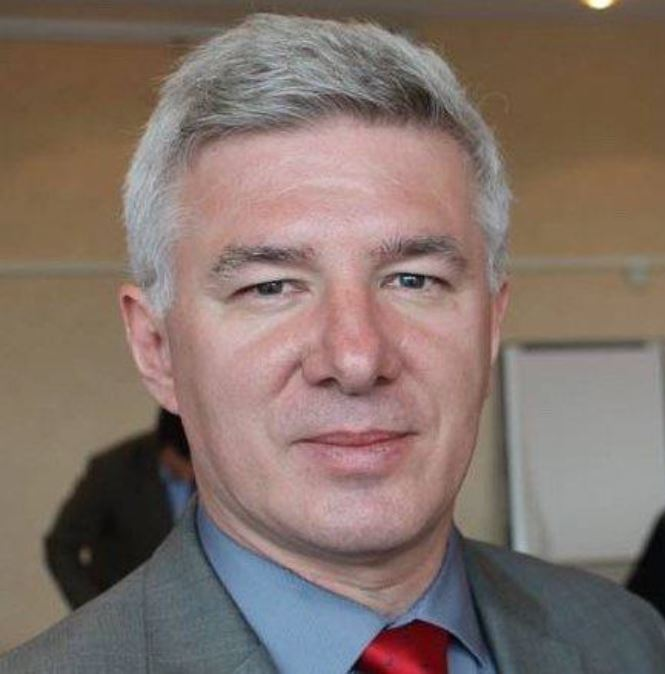
Rudelmar Bueno de Faria: Photo. Anglican Church of Canada

Rudelmar Bueno de Faria is the ACT Alliance General Secretary since June 1, 2017. Previously, Rudelmar served as the World Council of Churches Representative to the United Nations in New York, USA. Rudelmar was born in Carazinho, Rio Grande do Sul, Brazil on January 11, 1963.
