= Birgitte Qvist-Sørensen =

Danish theologist

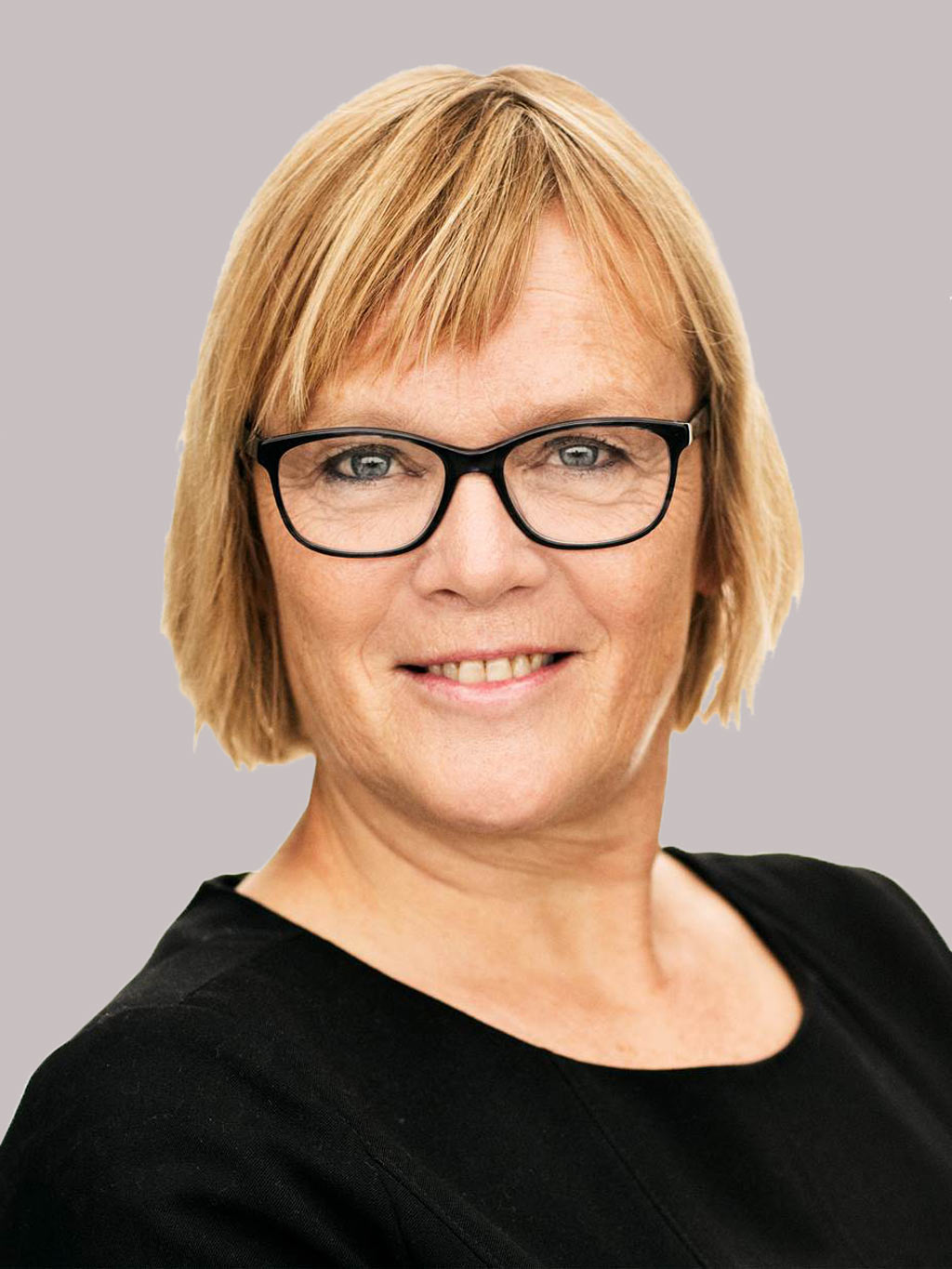
- Born: January 4, 1961 (age 65); Roskilde, Denmark
- Occupation: General Secretary
- Employer: DanChurchAid

Birgitte Qvist-Sørensen (born January 4, 1961, in Roskilde, Denmark) is a Danish theologist who since 2014 has been serving as the General Secretary of DanChurchAid. In 2018 she was elected Moderator of ACT Alliance – a global alliance of 146 churches and related organisations working together in over 120 countries to create positive and sustainable change in the lives of poor and marginalized people.

Qvist-Sørensen has a degree in theology from Aarhus University, and a Master's degree in Management Development from Copenhagen Business School.

Before becoming the General Secretary of DanChurchAid, she was the International Director of the organisation. Previously she has worked for Save the Children in Bosnia and Herzegovina with rehabilitation projects in refugee camps. Furthermore, she has been employed by the United Nations Development Fund for Women in Bangkok with women's projects in Southeast Asia as her main responsibility.

She has also worked with Organisational Analysis for UNESCO, and reconciliation projects for women in Belfast during The Troubles in Northern Ireland.
