= May 1997 Bangladesh cyclone =

Extremely Severe Cyclonic Storm BOB 01
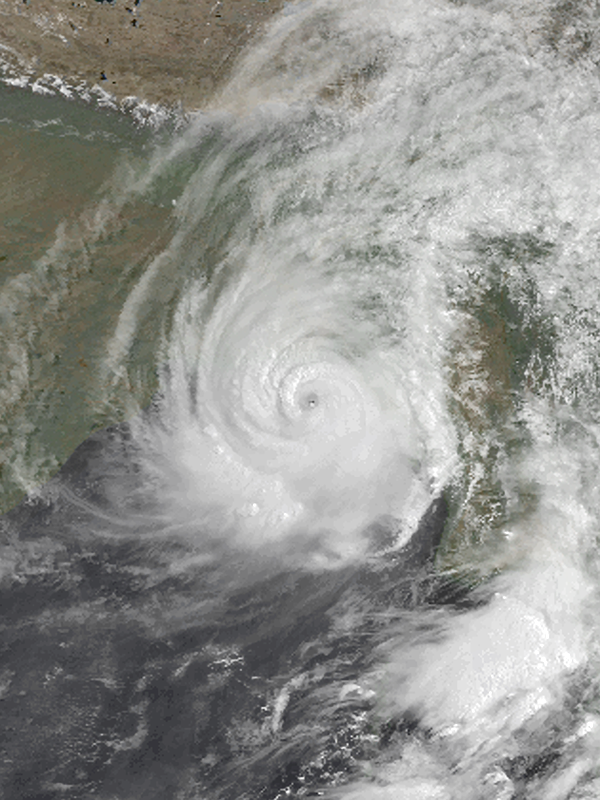
- BOB 01 near peak intensity off the coast of Bangladesh

Meteorological history
- Formed: May 14, 1997
- Dissipated: May 20, 1997

Extremely severe cyclonic storm
- 3-minute sustained (IMD)
- Highest winds: 165 km/h (105 mph)
- Lowest pressure: 964 hPa (mbar); 28.47 inHg

Category 4-equivalent tropical cyclone
- 1-minute sustained (SSHWS/JTWC)
- Highest winds: 215 km/h (130 mph)

Overall effects
- Fatalities: 332-765 total
- Missing: 750
- Damage: Unknown
- Areas affected: Bangladesh; Myanmar; India
- IBTrACS
- Part of the 1997 North Indian Ocean cyclone season

The May 1997 Bangladesh cyclone was a powerful and deadly storm that caused widespread damage and death throughout Bangladesh. Originating from a near-equatorial trough on May 15, 1997, the cyclone tracked in a general northward direction throughout its existence. The system gradually intensified over the following days, reaching the equivalent of a Category 1 hurricane on the Saffir–Simpson hurricane scale by May 17. The following day, the storm attained its peak intensity with winds of 215 km/h (135 mph) according to the JTWC and 165 km/h (105 mph) according to the IMD along with a barometric pressure of 964 mbar (hPa; 28.47 inHg). On May 19, the cyclone made landfall near Chittagong, Bangladesh before rapidly dissipating the next day.

Prior to the storm's landfall, official in Bangladesh prompted more than 500,000 residents to evacuate from coastal areas and seek shelter. Despite the large-scale evacuation, more than 1,000 people perished as a result of the cyclone, most of which took place offshore. Numerous structures were damaged or destroyed throughout the affected region and electricity was lost for millions of people. In some areas, entire villages were leveled by the cyclone's storm surge. In the wake of the storm, water-borne diseases began to spread due to standing water and bodies being left out in the open. In response to the disaster, funds from across the globe were sent into Bangladesh to help the country recover.

== Meteorological history ==
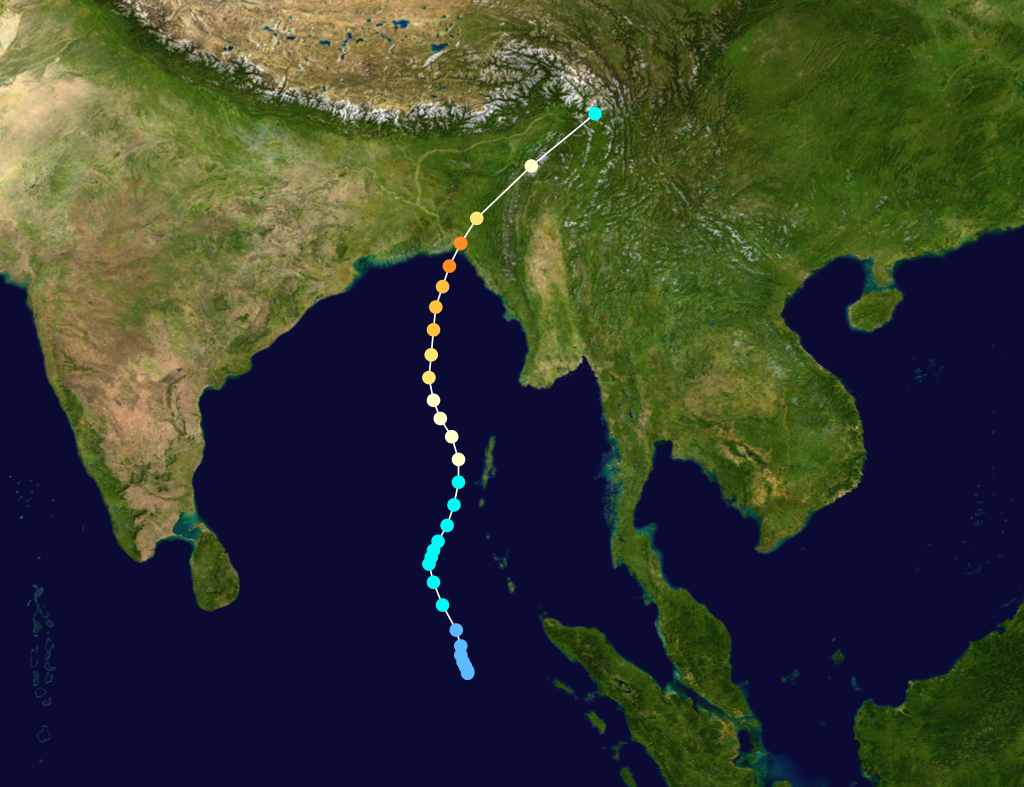
Map plotting the storm's track and intensity, according to the Saffir–Simpson scale Map key Saffir–Simpson scale Tropical depression (≤38 mph, ≤62 km/h) Tropical storm (39–73 mph, 63–118 km/h) Category 1 (74–95 mph, 119–153 km/h) Category 2 (96–110 mph, 154–177 km/h) Category 3 (111–129 mph, 178–208 km/h) Category 4 (130–156 mph, 209–251 km/h) Category 5 (≥157 mph, ≥252 km/h) Unknown Storm type Tropical cyclone Subtropical cyclone Extratropical cyclone, remnant low, tropical disturbance, or monsoon depression

On May 13, a near-equatorial trough developed. The poorly organized system slowly tracked towards the north-northwest. The following day, deep convection consolidated around the center of circulation and the Joint Typhoon Warning Center (JTWC) classified the system as Tropical Cyclone 01B. On May 15, the India Meteorological Department (IMD) also began monitoring the system; however, they classified it as Depression BOB 01. Favorable upper-level conditions and good outflow allowed the storm to intensify. Shortly after, the cyclone attained tropical storm-force winds and turned towards the northeast. While gradually increasing in forward motion, the storm continued to strengthen. The IMD eventually upgraded the system to a cyclonic storm on May 16.

On May 17, the cyclone attained winds of 120 km/h (75 mph), equivalent to a Category 1 hurricane on the Saffir–Simpson hurricane scale. By May 18 an eye developed and the storm reached its peak intensity with winds of 215 km/h (135 mph). At this time, the IMD assessed BOB 01 to have winds of 165 km/h (105 mph 3-minute sustained) and a barometric pressure of 964 mbar (hPa; 28.47 inHg). The cyclone made landfall the following day near Chittagong, Bangladesh at this intensity. After landfall, the storm rapidly tracked northeastward inland and dissipated early on May 20.

== Preparations ==
About a day before the cyclone would make landfall in Bangladesh, officials in the country raised the highest danger signals and evacuated numerous residents. According to the ACT Development, roughly 500,000 people evacuated low-lying coastal areas across the country. However, according to The Washington Post, several million people evacuated ahead of the cyclone's arrival. In response to the threat of a major disaster, the International Red Cross and Red Crescent Movement sent up to 33,000 volunteers to assist in evacuation efforts. The ACT Development set up shelters in the Cox's Bazar District, housing roughly 40,000 people, and their Disaster Preparedness Unit kept close contact with other organizations to prepare post-storm relief efforts. Initially, there were fears that the storm may become a repeat of the 1991 Bangladesh cyclone which killed 139,000 people; however, the storm turned towards the northeast prior to landfall, preventing the worst of the storm surge from directly striking the coast. Additionally, the system ended up hitting at low-tide instead of high-tide as initially feared. Had it struck at high tide, it is estimated that a storm surge of 6 m (20 ft) would have inundated much of the Bangladeshi coastline.

== Impact ==
In Bangladesh, the storm wrought catastrophic damage and left hundreds of people dead in its wake. On land, between 67 and 500 people died due to the storm. As the tail end of the system moved through, a tornado struck the same region, killing 46 more. Additionally, 750 fishermen went missing offshore during the storm; all are believed to have perished. In all, between 113 and 863 people died due to the cyclone; however, monetary losses are not available.

In Chittagong, news reports from Reuters stated that winds from the storm leveled homes and were throwing tin roofs like they were leaves. Within the first few hours of the cyclone's destructive passage of the country, six people were confirmed killed. Entire villages were leveled and numerous crops were flooded by the storm. On the islands of Teknaf and St. Martin's Island, a 2 m (6.6 ft) storm surge swamped the entire area, killing 100 people.

== See also ==
- 1997 North Indian Ocean cyclone season
