= DanChurchAid =

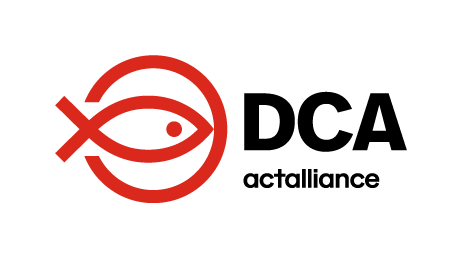
- Formation: 1922
- Type: Non Governmental Organisation
- Purpose: Humanitarian, developmental, and catastrophe relief aid
- Location: Copenhagen, Denmark
- Secretary General: Jonas Vejsager Nøddekær
- Website: https://www.danchurchaid.org/

DanChurchAid (Danish: Folkekirkens Nødhjælp) is a Danish humanitarian non governmental organisation aimed at supporting the world's poorest. It was founded in 1922, and is rooted in the Danish National Evangelical Lutheran Church. It is a member of ACT Development, a global alliance of over 140 churches and related humanitarian organisations, working to create positive and sustainable change in the lives of poor and marginalized people.

DanChurchAid's stated aim is to "assist the world's poorest to lead a life in dignity, regardless of race, creed, political or religious affiliation".

Since 2024, the secretary general of DanChurchAid has been Jonas Nøddekær. In 2025 it had a total income of DKK 1,136.3 million.

== History and purpose ==
=== Formation in 1922: Church aid in Europe ===
In the aftermath of World War I, evangelical churches in 22 European countries met to discuss how churches could aid the rebuilding of Europe. Several smaller churches in war-torn countries were dependent on external help to survive, and in light of that a European church alliance was formed. DanChurchAid—at that time named "Den danske Folkekirkes Nødhjælp til Europas Evangeliske kirker"—became the Danish branch of the alliance.

=== World War II: Refugee aid ===
After World War II, DanChurchAid began to focus on aiding war refugees. The organisation became part of the Lutheran World Federation and the World Council of Churches, and were now able to help refugees from outside of Europe as well as within.

The engagement in international refugee and disaster relief aid led to the organisation adopting its current Danish name, Folkekirkens Nødhjælp, in 1953.

=== 1960 to present day: Catastrophe relief aid, humanitarian aid, and developmental aid ===
In the 1960s, DanChurchAid primarily worked with catastrophe relief and humanitarian aid. During the Biafra war in Nigeria, the organisation coordinated and led the Biafran airlift, a shared effort from church and humanitarian organisations to bring aid to children in Biafra. The airlift completed roughly 5,000 night flights.

In the 1970s, DanChurchAid started working with developmental aid for the first time.

Since 1980, DanChurchAid has increasingly focused on the political reasons behind poverty and emergency relief aid. During the Apartheid conflict in South Africa, the organisation invited Desmond Tutu to Denmark. He encouraged the Danish government to boycott the import of coal from South Africa. That became the start of a larger political pressure, which in 1985 led then-Foreign Minister Uffe Ellemann-Jensen to stop the import of coal from South Africa along with other goods.

In 2010 DanChurchAid became a part of ACT Alliance, an alliance composed of over 140 churches and related humanitarian organisations, working in over 120 countries.

== Work and results ==
DanChurchAid works in 20 countries across the world, with regional offices in Africa, Asia and the Middle East. The countries include:

Europe

- Denmark (Headquarters)
- Ukraine

Africa

- Central African Republic
- Democratic Republic of Congo
- Ethiopia
- Kenya
- Libya
- Malawi
- Mali
- Sudan
- South Sudan
- Uganda
- Zambia
- Zimbabwe

Asia

- Cambodia
- Myanmar
- Nepal

Middle East

- Iraq
- Lebanon
- Palestine
- Syria

In 2025, DanChurchAid spent DKK 976 million on aid work across all countries. 4,8% of the total income was spent on administration costs.

== Secretary generals ==
- 2024–current: Jonas Vejsager Nøddekær
- 2014–2024: Birgitte Qvist-Sørensen
- 2005–2014: Henrik Stubkjær
- 2002–2005: Peter Lodberg
- 1992–2002: Christian Balslev-Olesen
