= 1997 North Indian Ocean cyclone season =

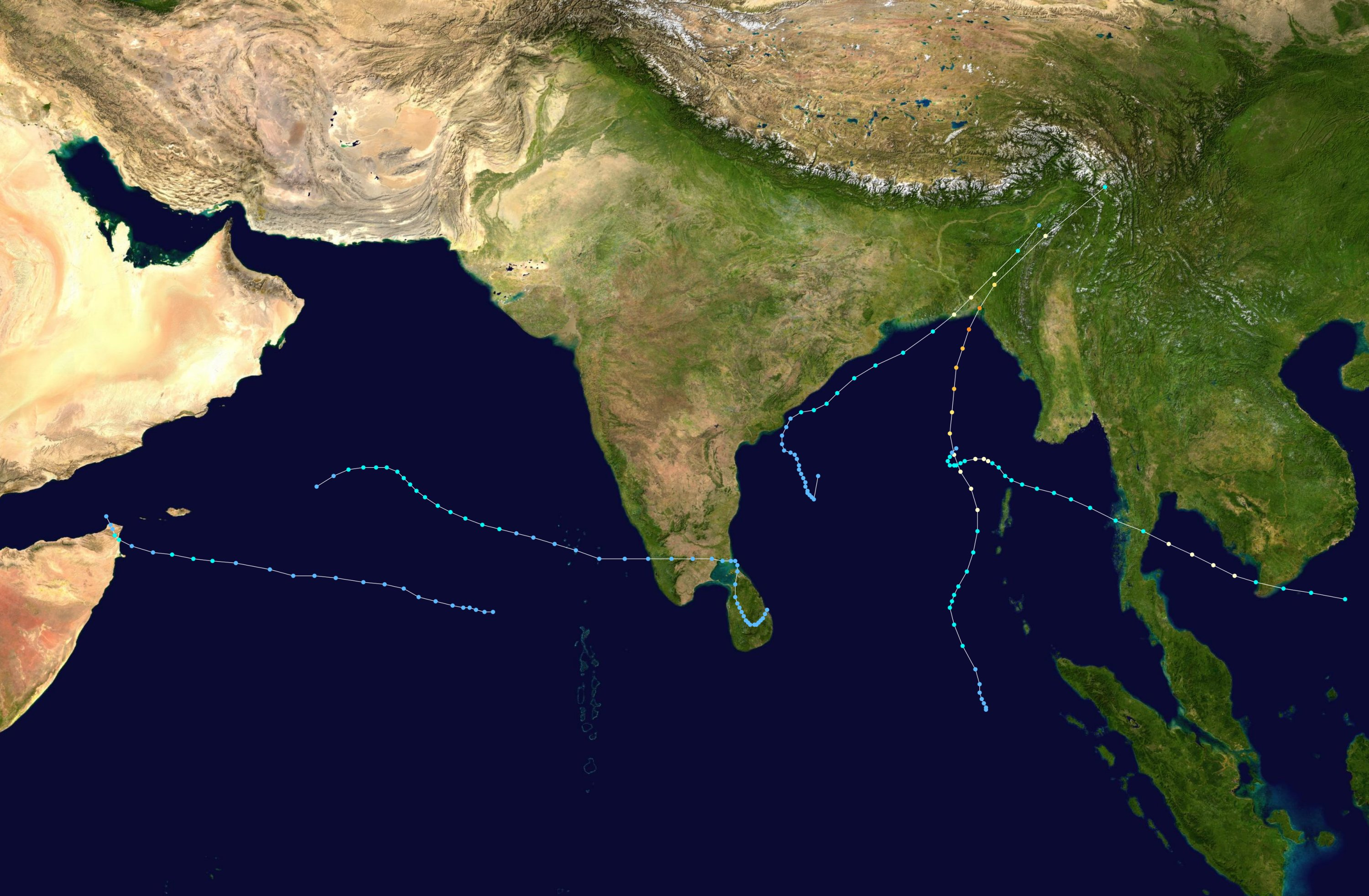
- Season summary map

Seasonal boundaries
- First system formed: May 14, 1997
- Last system dissipated: November 13, 1997

Strongest storm
- Name: BOB 01
  - Maximum winds: 165 km/h (105 mph) (3-minute sustained)
  - Lowest pressure: 964 hPa (mbar)

Seasonal statistics
- Depressions: 10
- Deep depressions: 9
- Cyclonic storms: 4
- Severe cyclonic storms: 2
- Very severe cyclonic storms: 1
- Extremely severe cyclonic storms: 1
- Total fatalities: 413 total
- Total damage: Unknown

Related articles
- 1997 Atlantic hurricane season; 1997 Pacific hurricane season; 1997 Pacific typhoon season

The 1997 North Indian Ocean cyclone season was a near-average season. It had no bounds, but cyclones tend to form between April and December, with peaks in May and November. These dates conventionally delimit the period of each year when most tropical cyclones form in the northern Indian Ocean.

== Season summary ==
Five tropical cyclones were observed, making 1997 an average season. However, 3 reached Cyclone strength.

== Systems ==
=== Extremely Severe Cyclonic Storm BOB 01 (01B) ===
- Extremely severe cyclonic storm (IMD)
- Category 4 tropical cyclone (SSHWS)
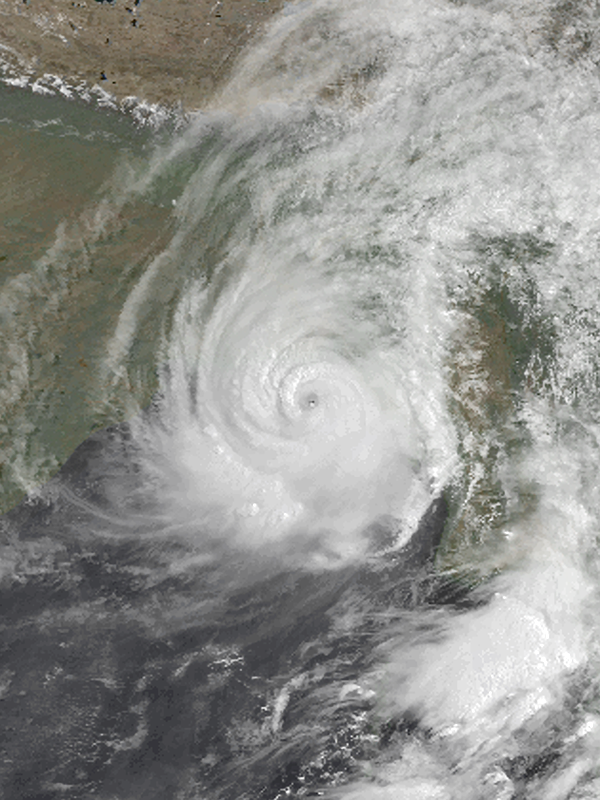
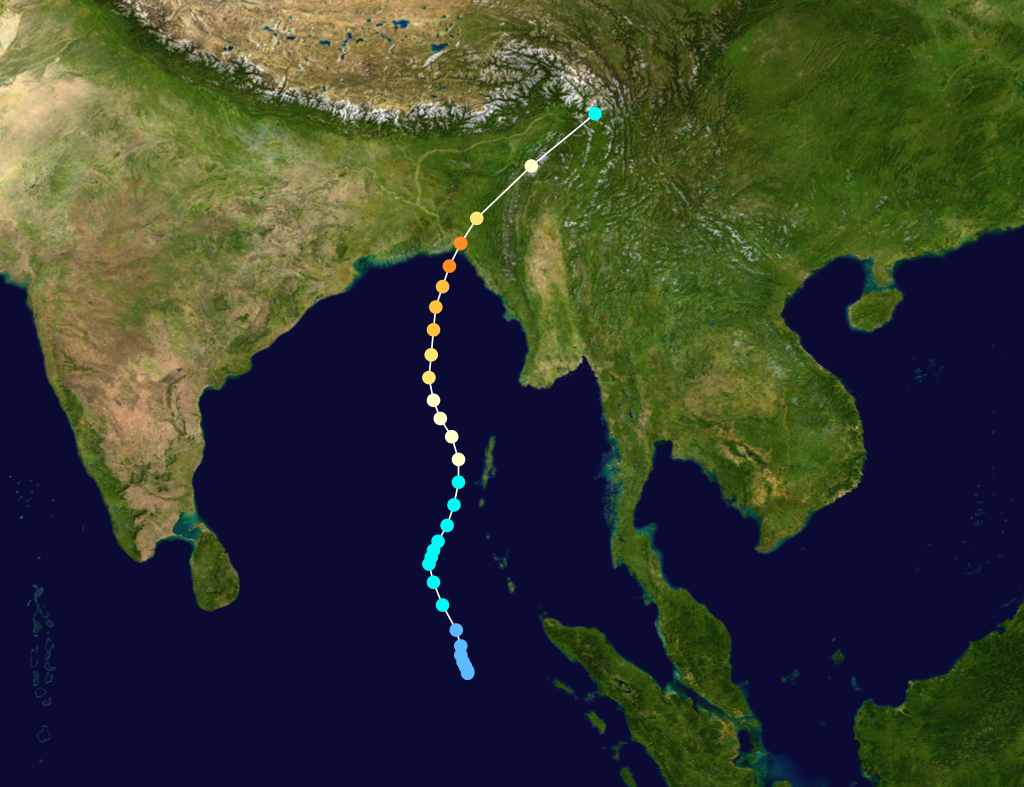
- Duration: May 14 – May 20
- Peak intensity: 165 km/h (105 mph) (3-min); 964 hPa (mbar)

On May 13, a near-equatorial trough developed. The poorly organized system slowly tracked towards the north-northwest. The following day, deep convection consolidated around the center of circulation and the Joint Typhoon Warning Center (JTWC) classified the system as Tropical Cyclone 01B. Favorable upper-level conditions and good outflow allowed the storm to intensify. Shortly after, the cyclone attained tropical storm-force winds and turned towards the northeast. While gradually increasing in forward motion, the storm continued to strengthen. On May 17, the cyclone attained winds of 120 km/h (75 km/h), equivalent to a Category 1 hurricane on the Saffir–Simpson scale. By May 18 an eye developed and the storm reached its peak intensity with winds of 215 km/h (135 mph) before making landfall near Chittagong. After landfall, the storm rapidly tracked northeastward inland and dissipated early on May 20. It caused significant damage and 67 fatalities.

=== Deep Depression BOB 02 ===
- Deep depression (IMD)
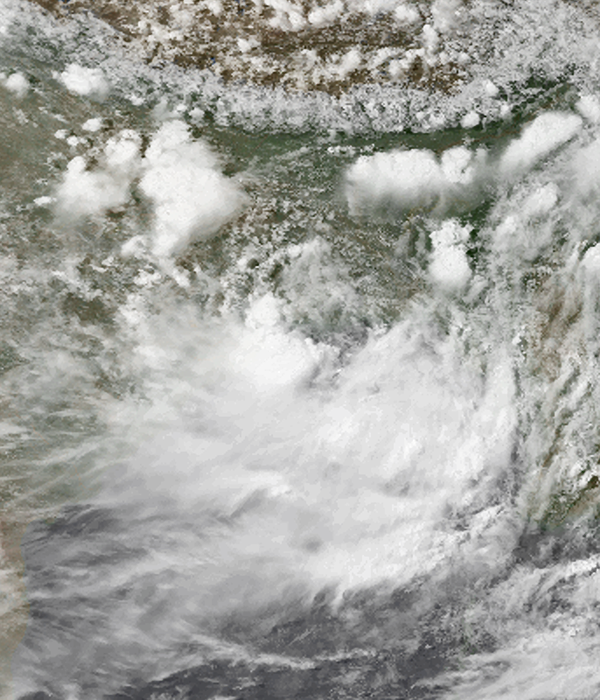
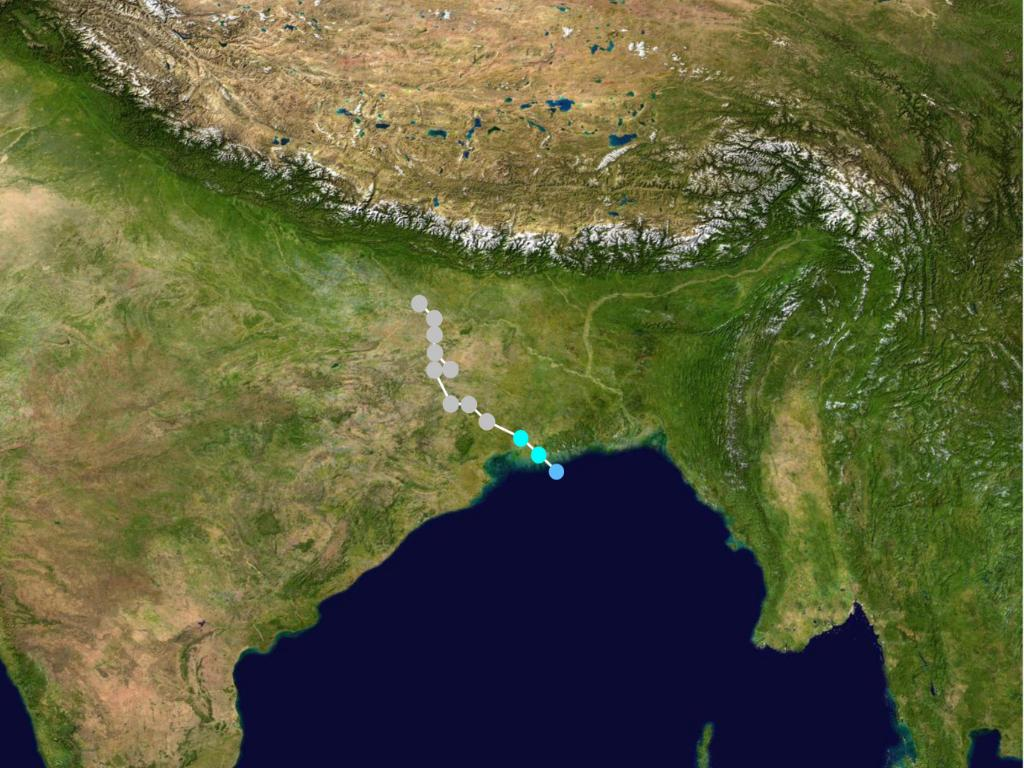
- Duration: June 26 – June 30
- Peak intensity: 55 km/h (35 mph) (3-min); 985 hPa (mbar)

=== Deep Depression BOB 03 ===
- Deep depression (IMD)
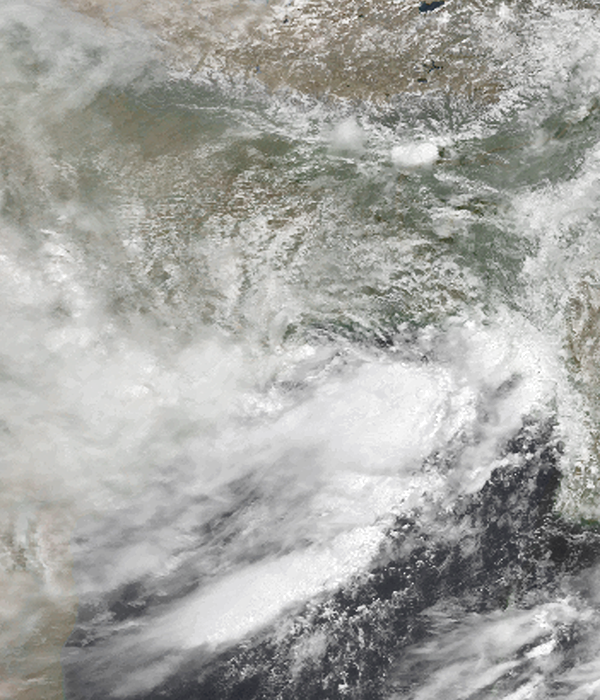
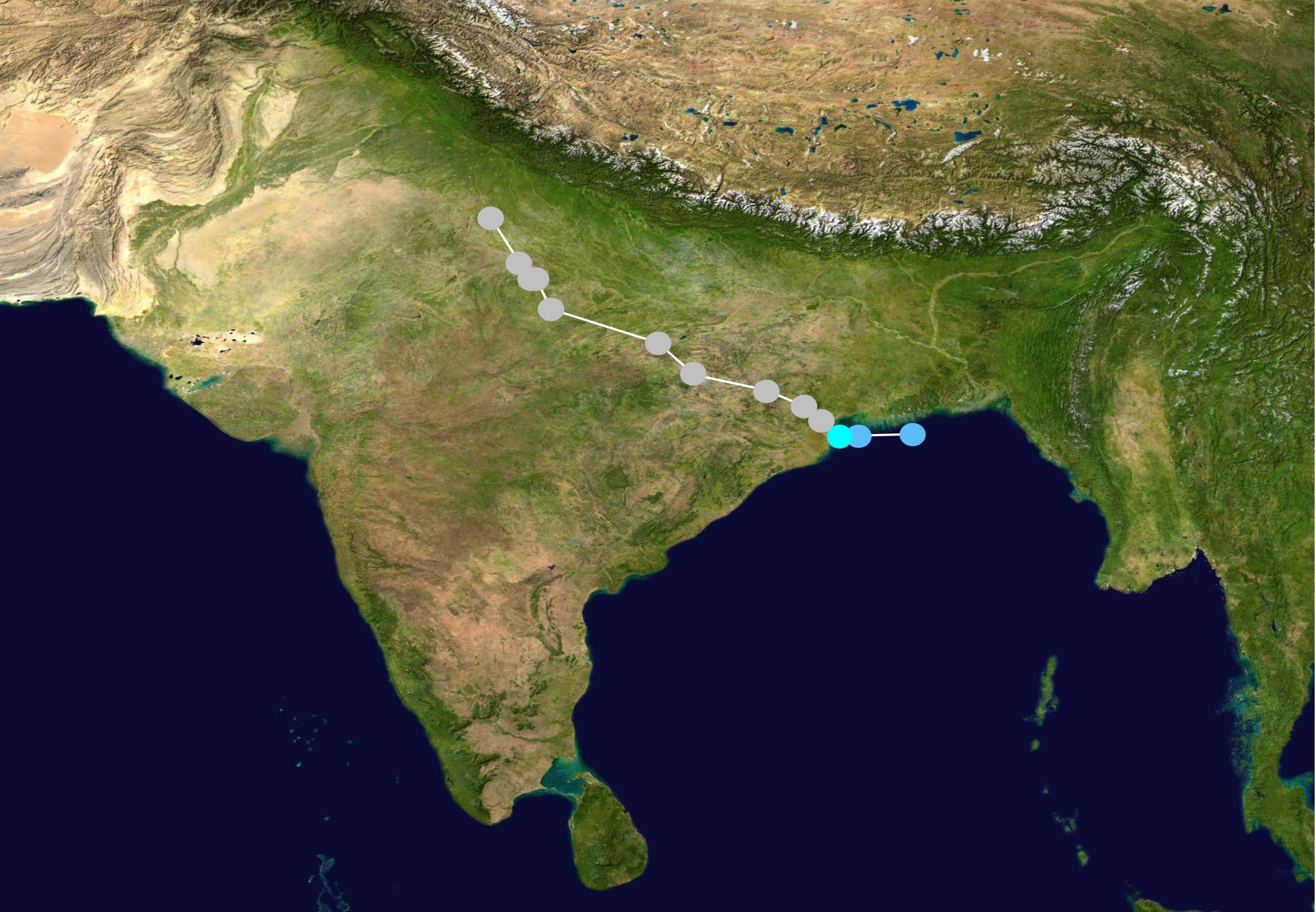
- Duration: July 29 – August 2
- Peak intensity: 55 km/h (35 mph) (3-min); 1002 hPa (mbar)

=== Deep Depression BOB 04 ===
- Deep depression (IMD)
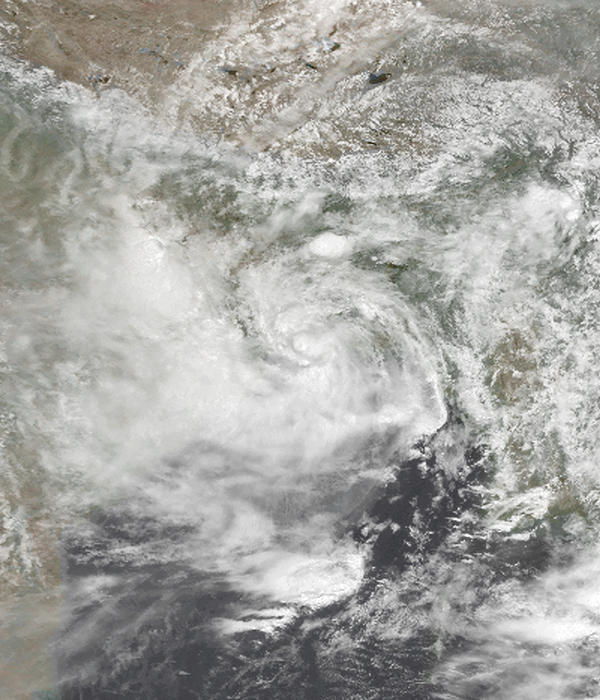
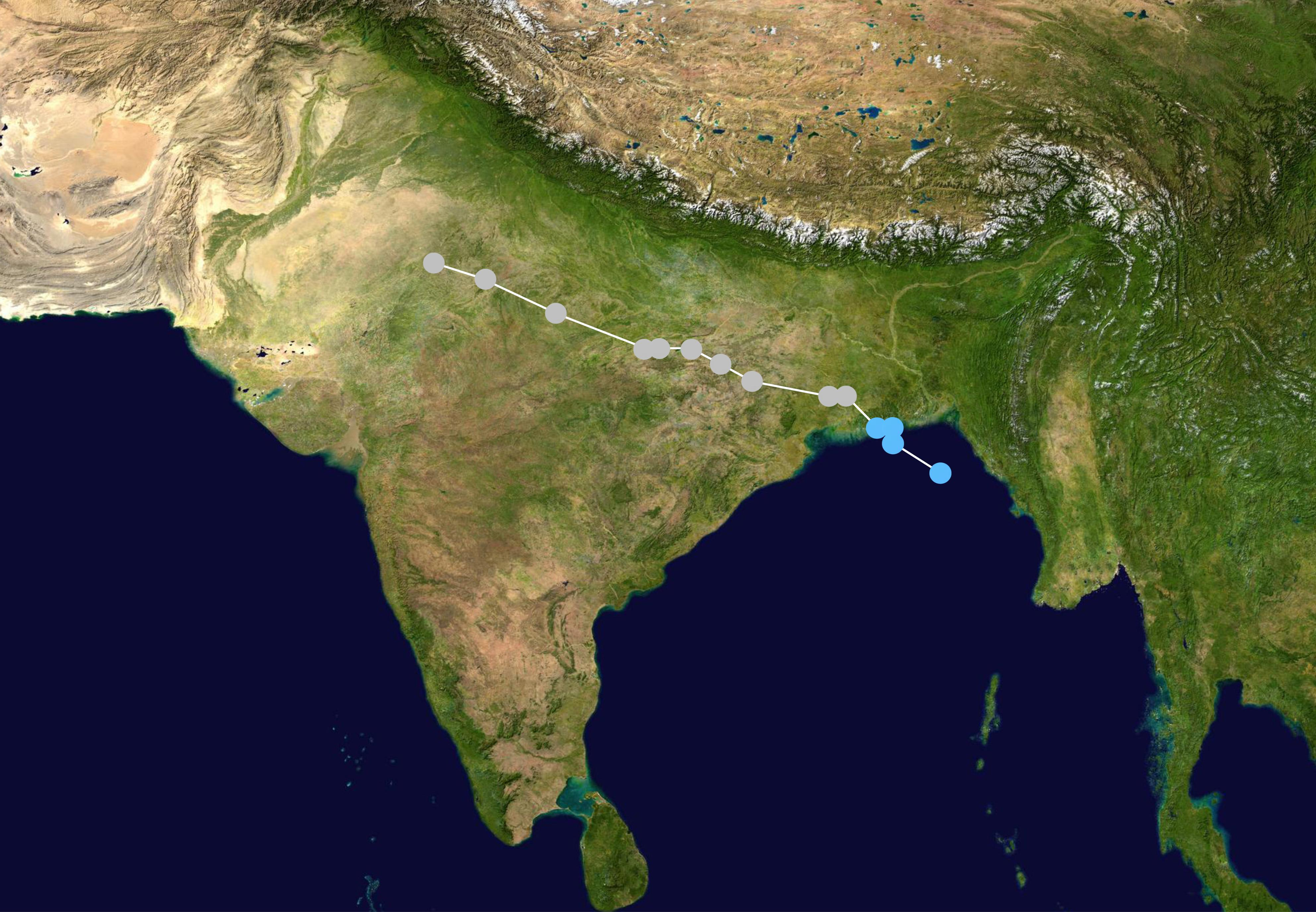
- Duration: August 4 – August 7
- Peak intensity: 55 km/h (35 mph) (3-min); 988 hPa (mbar)

=== Deep Depression BOB 05 ===
- Deep depression (IMD)
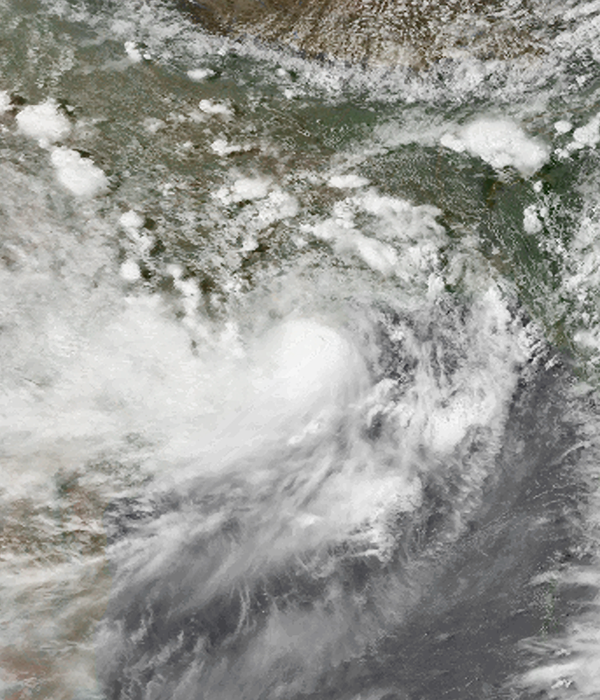
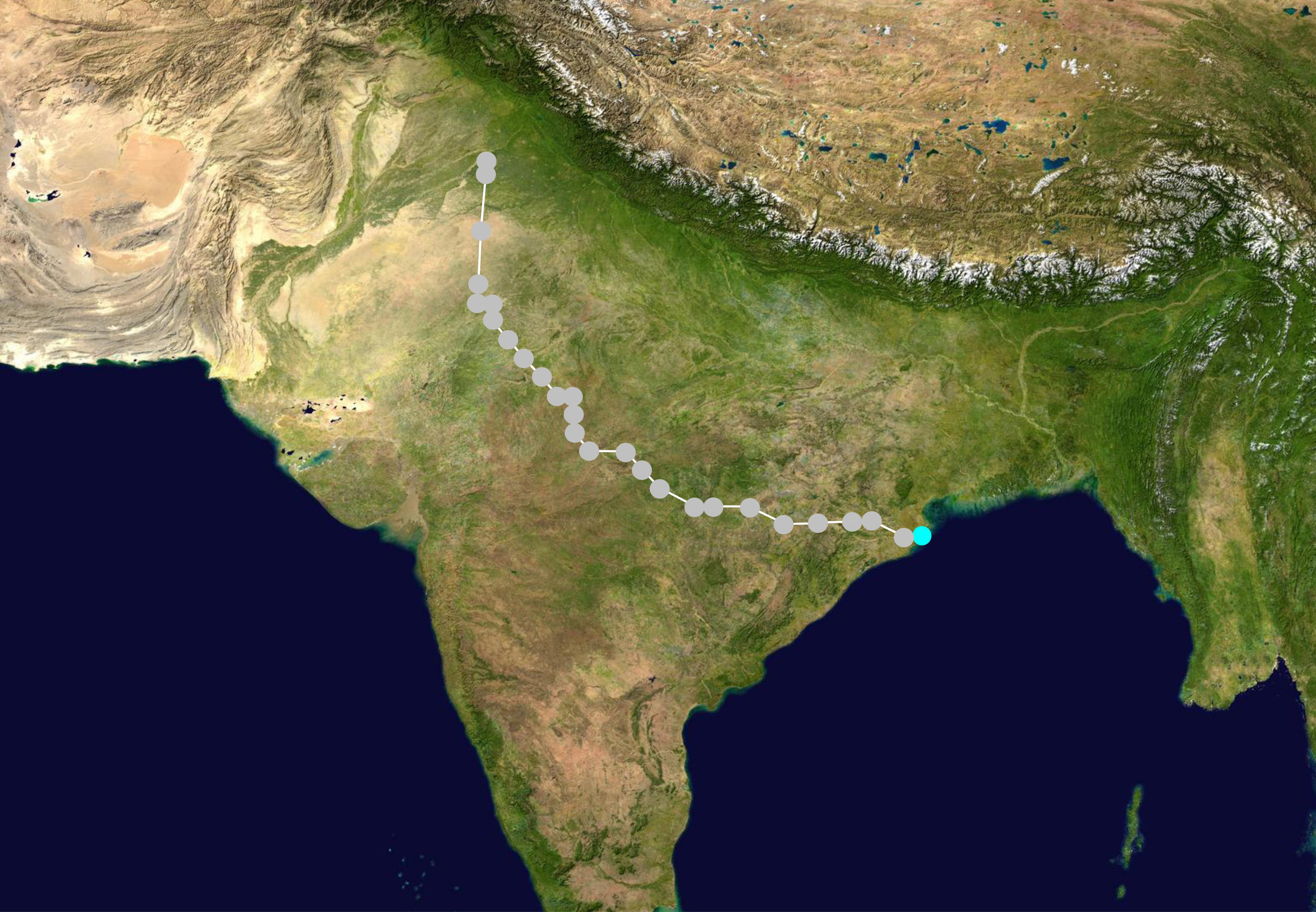
- Duration: August 20 – August 27
- Peak intensity: 55 km/h (35 mph) (3-min); 990 hPa (mbar)

=== Depression BOB 06 ===
- Depression (IMD)
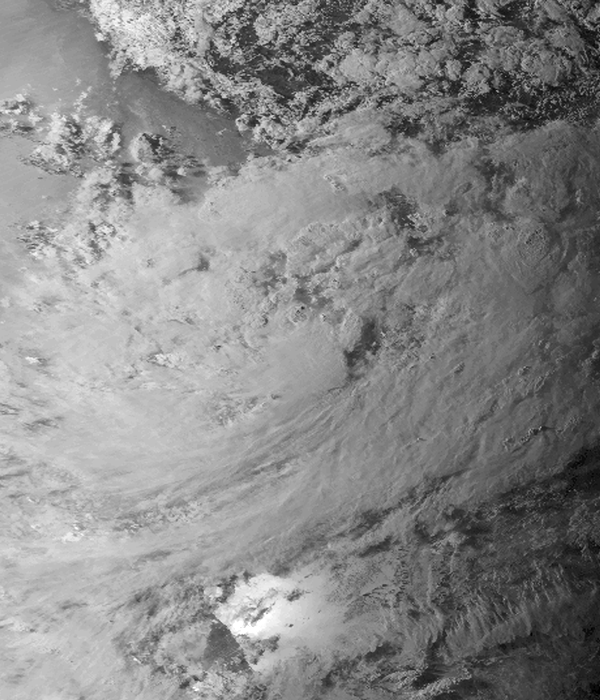
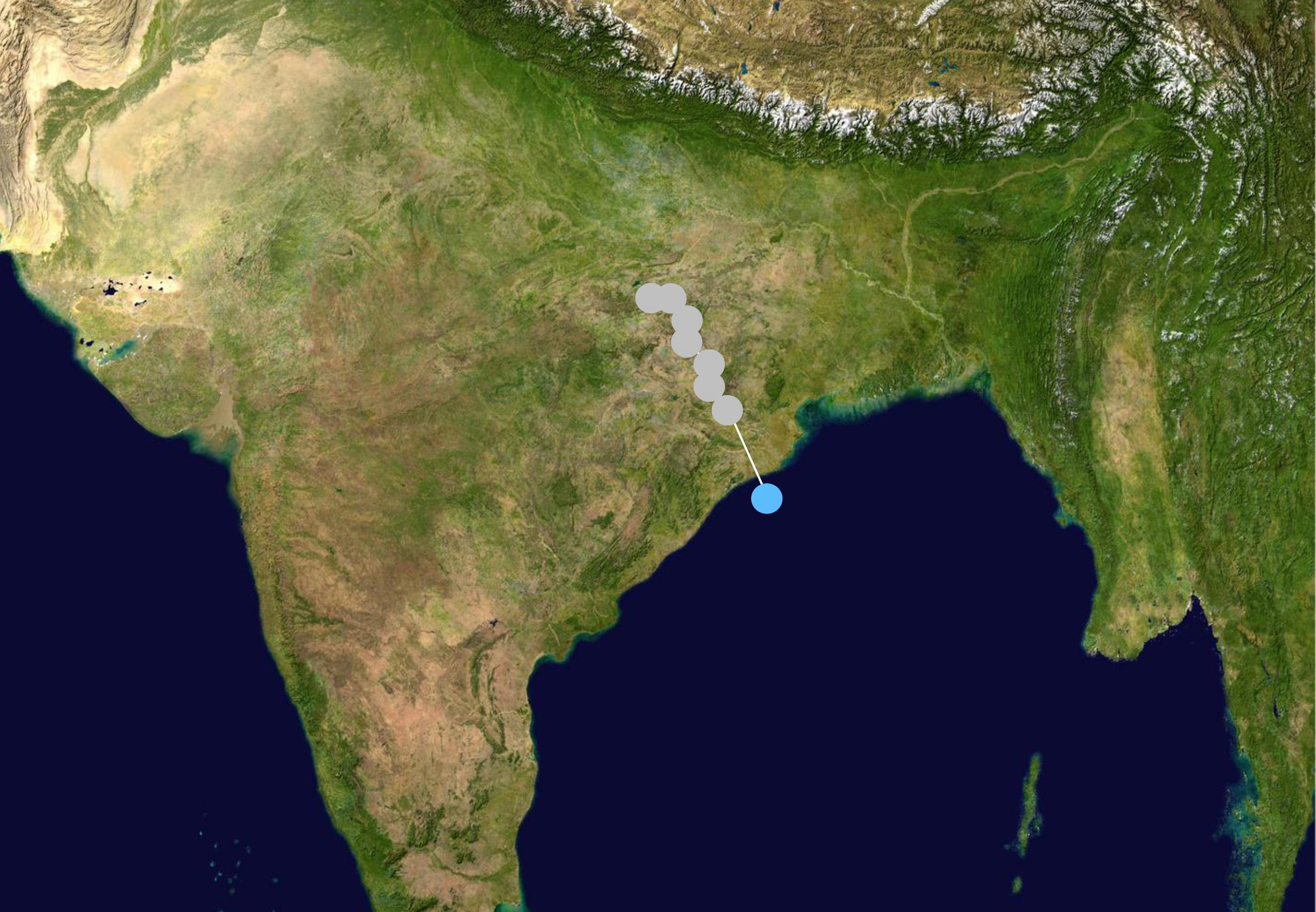
- Duration: August 28 – August 30
- Peak intensity: 45 km/h (30 mph) (3-min); 994 hPa (mbar)

=== Severe Cyclonic Storm BOB 07 (02B) ===
- Severe cyclonic storm (IMD)
- Category 1 tropical cyclone (SSHWS)
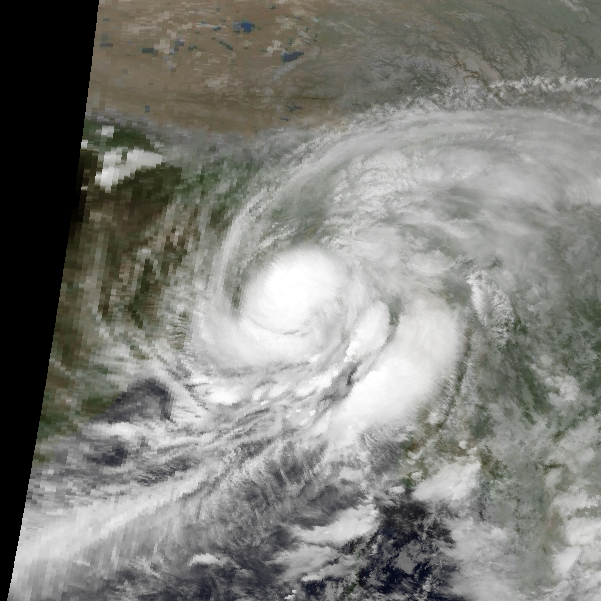
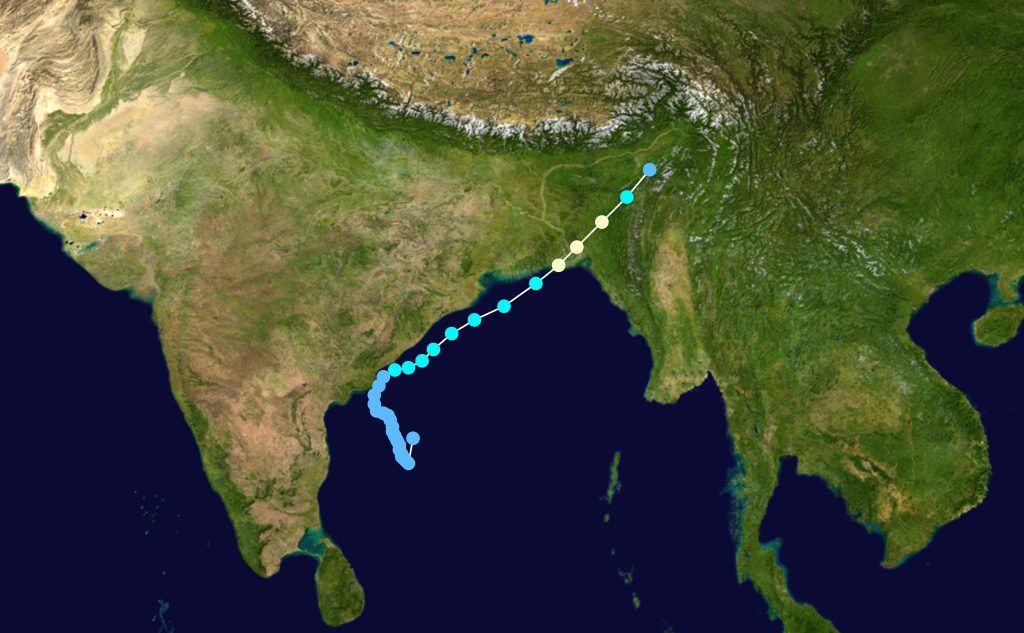
- Duration: September 19 – September 27
- Peak intensity: 100 km/h (65 mph) (3-min); 994 hPa (mbar)

On September 19, a tropical depression formed from an area of disturbed weather in the western Bay of Bengal. It drifted northwestward towards the Indian coastline, but a mid-latitude trough pulled it northeastward, The depression strengthened to a tropical storm on the 24th, and it reached cyclone strength while paralleling the Indian coastline on 26th. It made landfall in Bangladesh on the 27th, and dissipated shortly thereafter. Tropical Cyclone 2B was responsible for 51 fatalities and left an additional 137 people missing.

=== Deep Depression ARB 01 (04A) ===
- Deep depression (IMD)
- Tropical storm (SSHWS)
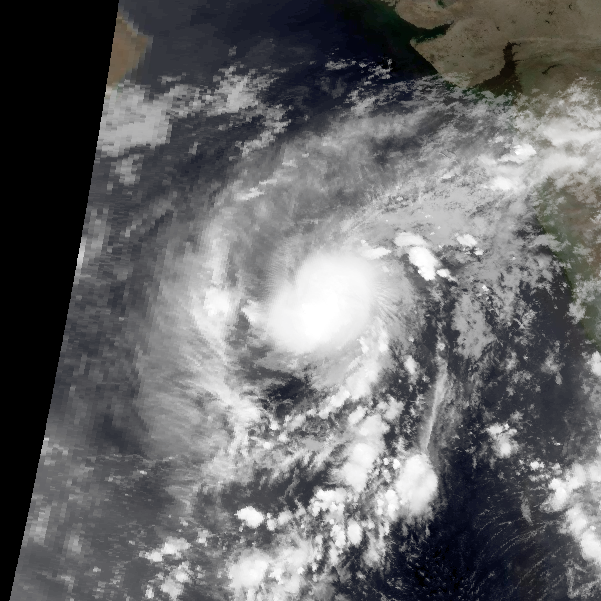
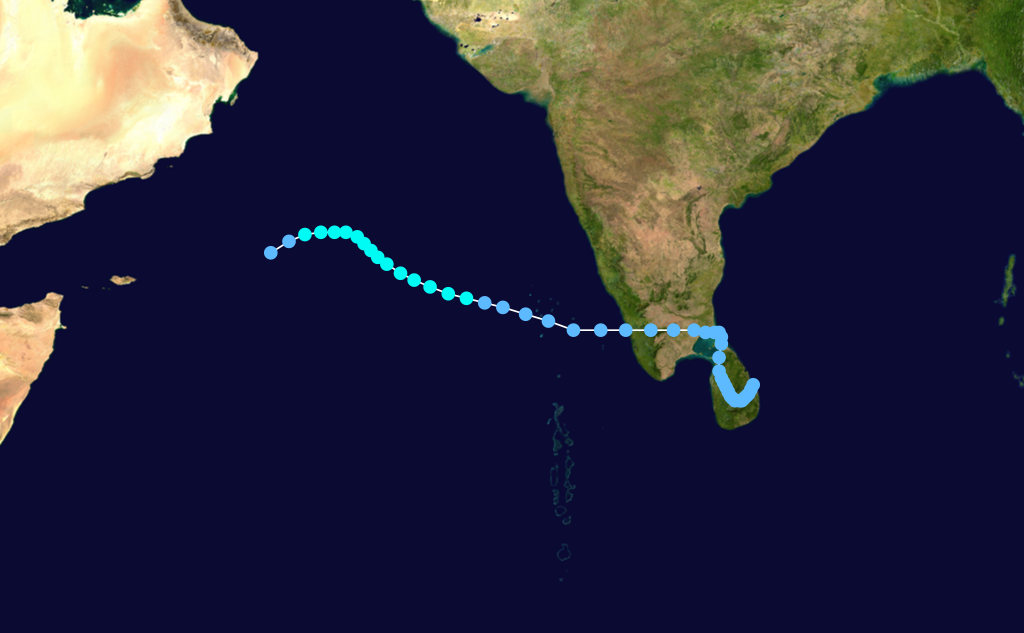
- Duration: November 2 – November 14
- Peak intensity: 55 km/h (35 mph) (3-min); 1005 hPa (mbar)

On November 2, a tropical depression developed over Sri Lanka. It drifted southward, northward, then westward over India. On the 10th, it was upgraded to a tropical storm over the Arabian Sea, and it reached its peak of 65 mph (105 km/h) winds the next day. Wind shear caused the storm to dissipate over the open waters on the 14th.

=== Cyclonic Storm BOB 08 (Linda) ===
- Cyclonic storm (IMD)
- Category 1 tropical cyclone (SSHWS)
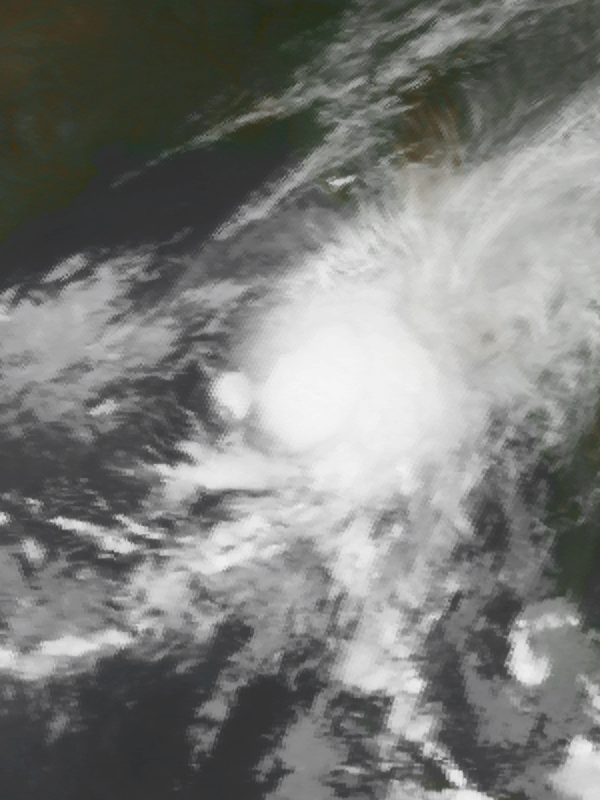
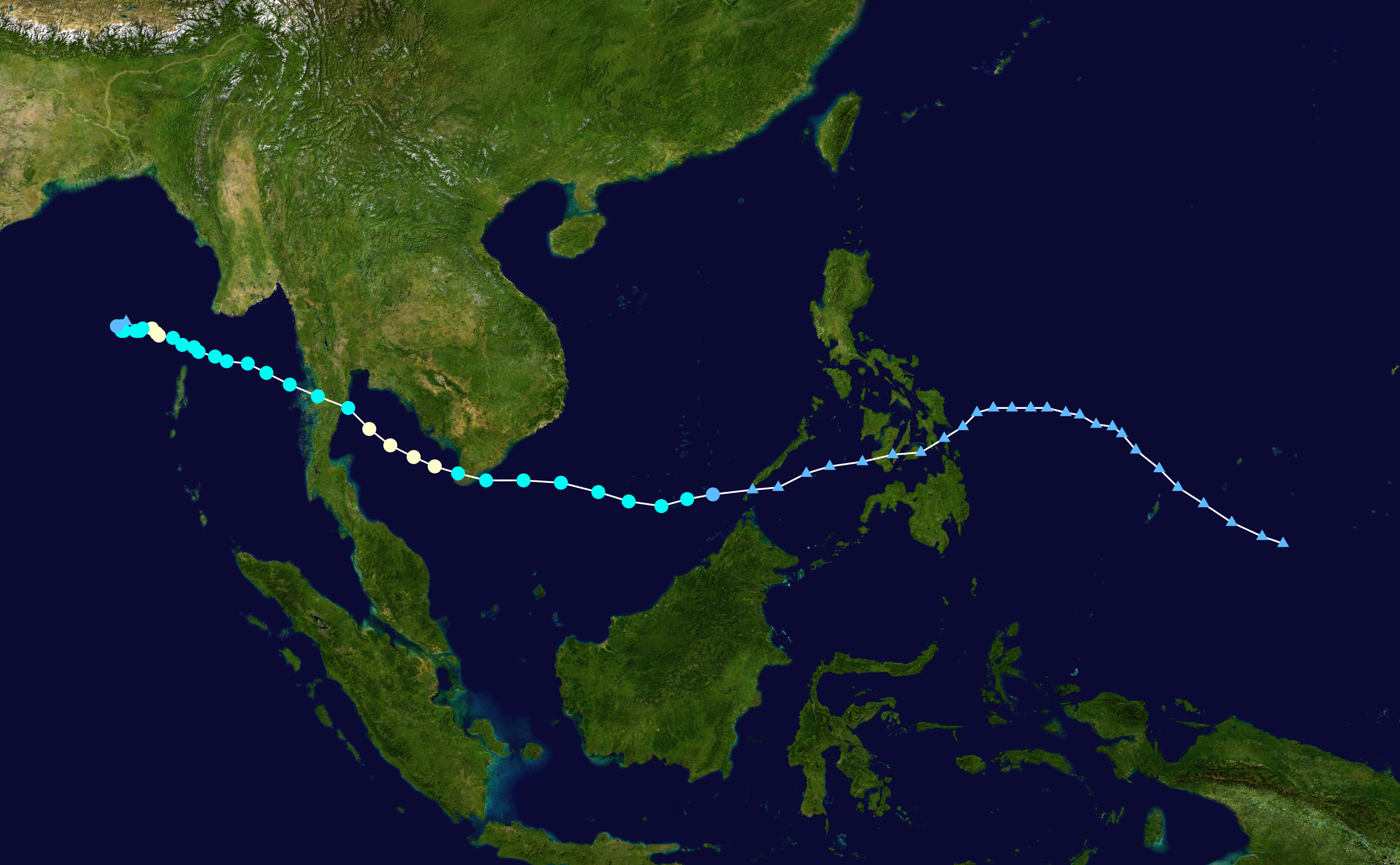
- Duration: November 3 (entered basin) – November 9
- Peak intensity: 65 km/h (40 mph) (3-min); 1004 hPa (mbar)

Typhoon Linda killed 30 while crossing the Malay Peninsula, emerged into the Bay of Bengal on November 4. It continued westward, reaching cyclone strength again, but vertical shear caused it to dissipate on the 9th.

In southern Thailand, 30 people were killed and 102 others were listed as missing as a result of the storm. Linda damaged at least 100 homes and sank 30 ships in the region. An estimated 6,400,000 m^{2} of farmland were destroyed by Linda.

=== Tropical Cyclone 03A ===
- Tropical storm (SSHWS)
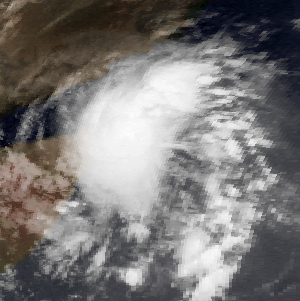
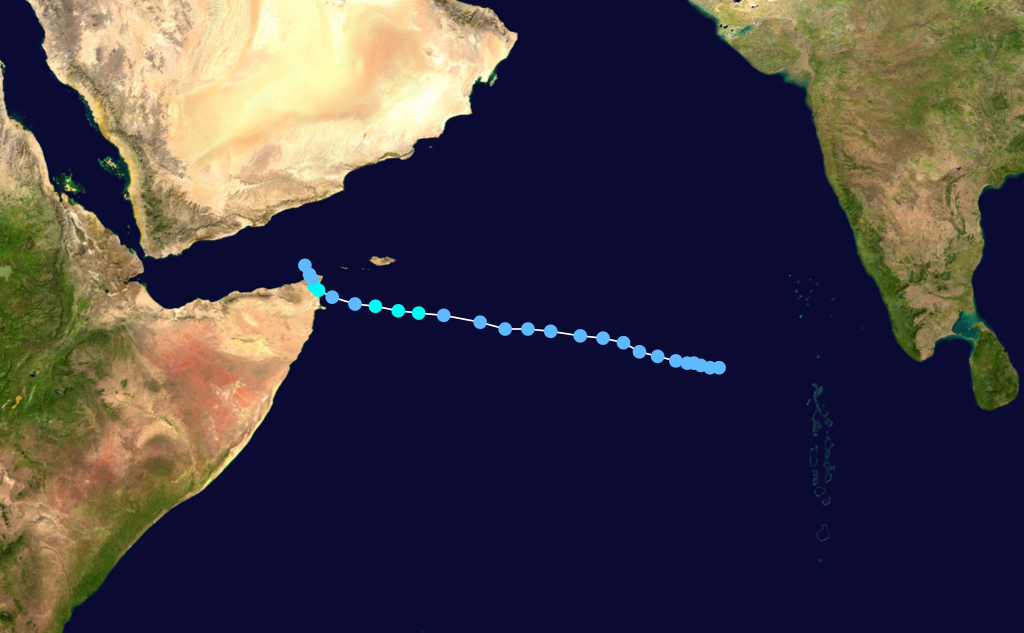
- Duration: November 4 – November 10
- Peak intensity: 65 km/h (40 mph) (1-min);

A broad trough of low pressure formed into a tropical depression on November 4 in the central Arabian Sea. It moved westward, slowly intensifying into a tropical storm on the 8th. Vertical shear weakened it to a depression later that day, but on the 9th, just before making landfall on eastern Somalia, it restrengthened to a tropical storm. Tropical Storm Three dissipated on the 10th without causing any reported damage.

== See also ==
- 1997 Atlantic hurricane season
- 1997 Pacific hurricane season
- 1997 Pacific typhoon season
- South-West Indian Ocean cyclone seasons: 1996–97, 1997–98
- Australian region cyclone seasons: 1996–97, 1997–98
- South Pacific cyclone seasons: 1996–97, 1997–98
