= ACT Alliance =

Global alliance of more than 145 churches and related organisations

- Formation: 27 February 2009; 17 years ago
- Headquarters: Geneva, Switzerland
- General Secretary: Rudelmar Bueno de Faria
- Website: actalliance.org

ACT Alliance is a global alliance of more than 145 churches and related organisations from over 120 countries created to provide humanitarian aid for poor and marginalized people. 76% of its member organisations are rooted on the global south, 22% in the global north and 2% have a global presence.

Rudelmar Bueno de Faria, a national citizen from Brazil, is currently the General Secretary and Birgitte Qvist-Sørensen, General Secretary of DanChurchAid, is the current moderator of the organisation.

== History ==
ACT Alliance was formed in 2010, merging two organisations: ACT International formed in 1995 to work on delivering humanitarian aid and ACT Development formed in 2007, towards a more coordinated approach to humanitarian assistance and development cooperation. ACT Alliance was formed with a starting membership of 130 organisations. The membership of the alliance is defined by a relation to the World Council of Churches and the Lutheran World Federation combined with a mandate to work on humanitarian assistance and/or development issues.

== Thematic work areas ==
ACT Alliance provides humanitarian assistance when emergencies occur across the world and in 2015 responded to 43 emergencies worldwide. The alliance engages in advocacy in a number of thematic areas including the post-2015 process which in September 2015 generated the Sustainable Development Goals, issues of finance for development and development effectiveness, private sector accountability, migration, gender justice and climate justice. In countries with more than one ACT Alliance member organisation, members are encouraged to collaborate as national, and in some cases, regional, Forums. In 2016 ACT Alliance comprised 49 National Forums and 10 Regional Forums across the world. The third General Assembly of the ACT Alliance affirmed its New Global Strategy for the period 2019–2026. The main programmatic areas include: Gender Justice, Climate Justice, Peace and Human Security, Migration and Displacement, and Humanitarian Response and Disaster Risk Reduction.

== Positions ==
ACT Alliance has a seat on the boards of the Sphere Project and the International Council for Voluntary Agencies (ICVA), and holds the position of vice-chair as a Principal of the Steering Committee for Humanitarian Response (SCHR). In his capacity as representing SCHR, ACT Alliance General Secretary Rudelmar Bueno de Faria is a Standing Invitee of the Inter-Agency Standing Committee (IASC). ACT Alliance is also a member of the CHS Alliance, with the ACT Alliance secretariat having achieved HAP certification in 2013. In 2017 ACT Alliance Secretariat was certified against CHS standards.
