= 1997–98 Southern Hemisphere tropical cyclone season =

The 1997-98 Southern Hemisphere tropical cyclone season ran year-round from 1 July 1997 to 30 June 1998. It was made up of three different basins and seasons; the

- 1997–98 South-West Indian Ocean cyclone season west of 90°E
- 1997–98 Australian region cyclone season between 90°E and 160°E
- 1997–98 South Pacific cyclone season east of 160°E
