= 1997–98 Australian region cyclone season =

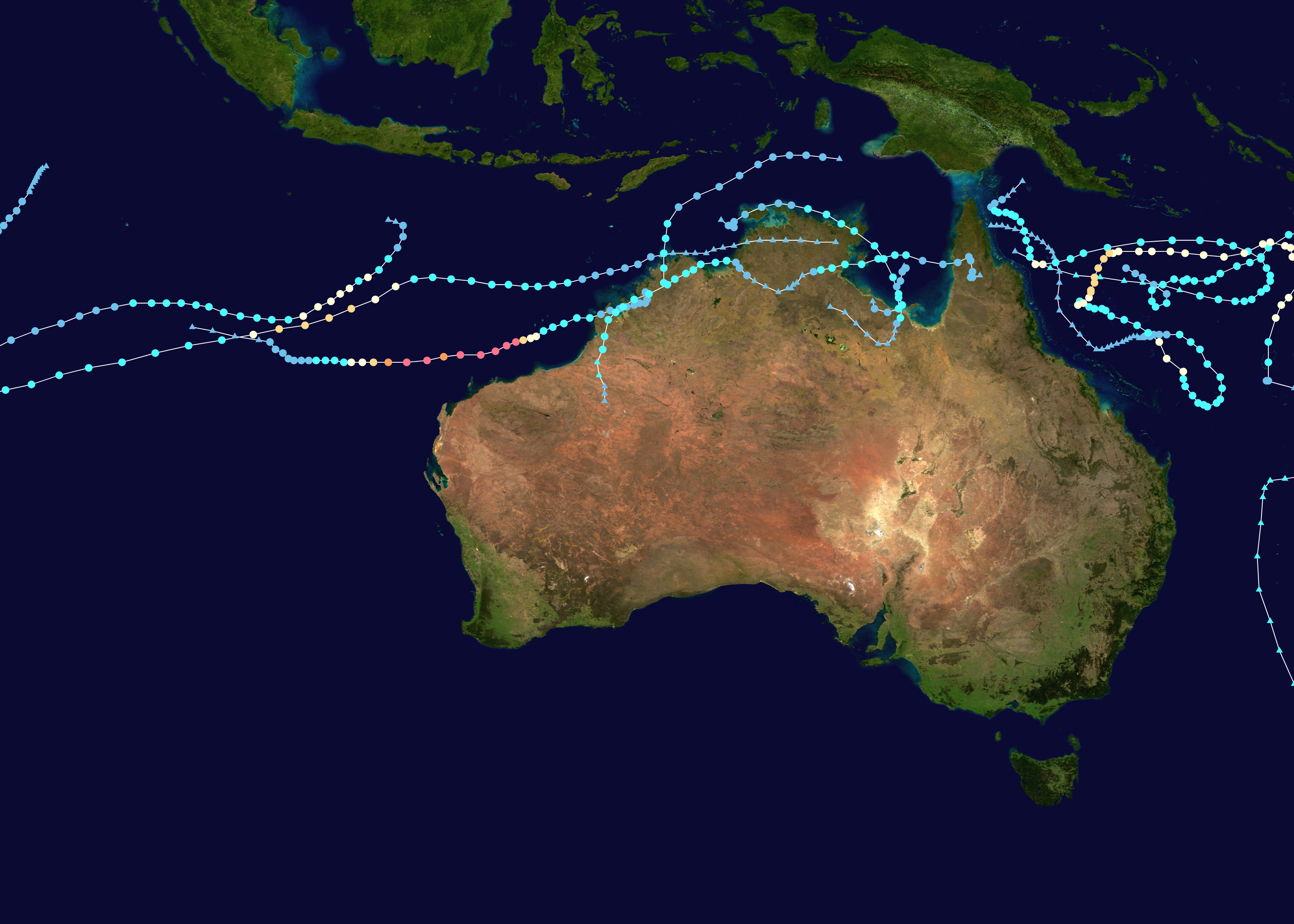
- Season summary map

Seasonal boundaries
- First system formed: 19 November 1997
- Last system dissipated: 19 April 1998

Strongest storm
- Name: Tiffany
  - Maximum winds: 170 km/h (105 mph) (10-minute sustained)
  - Lowest pressure: 940 hPa (mbar)

Seasonal statistics
- Tropical lows: 11
- Tropical cyclones: 9 official, 1 unofficial
- Severe tropical cyclones: 4
- Total fatalities: Unknown
- Total damage: Unknown

Related articles
- 1997–98 South-West Indian Ocean cyclone season; 1997–98 South Pacific cyclone season

The 1997–98 Australian region cyclone season was a slightly below average tropical cyclone season. It ran from 1 November 1997 to 30 April 1998. The regional tropical cyclone operational plan also defines a tropical cyclone year separately from a tropical cyclone season, and the "tropical cyclone year" ran from 1 July 1997 to 30 June 1998.

Tropical cyclones in this area were monitored by four Tropical Cyclone Warning Centres (TCWCs): the Australian Bureau of Meteorology in Perth, Darwin, and Brisbane; and TCWC Port Moresby in Papua New Guinea.

== Systems ==
=== Tropical Cyclone Nute ===
- Category 2 tropical cyclone (Australian scale)
- Category 1 tropical cyclone (SSHWS)
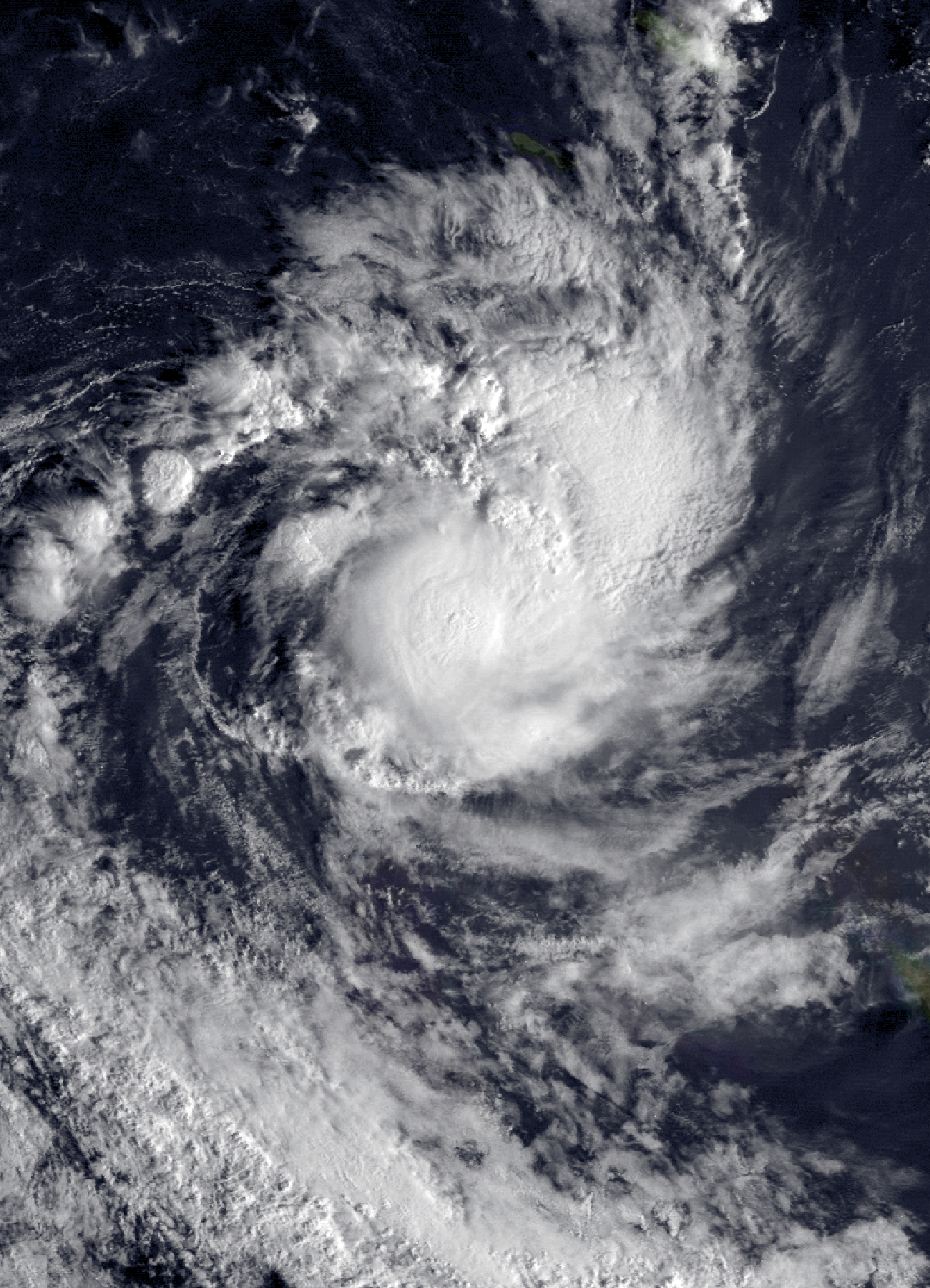
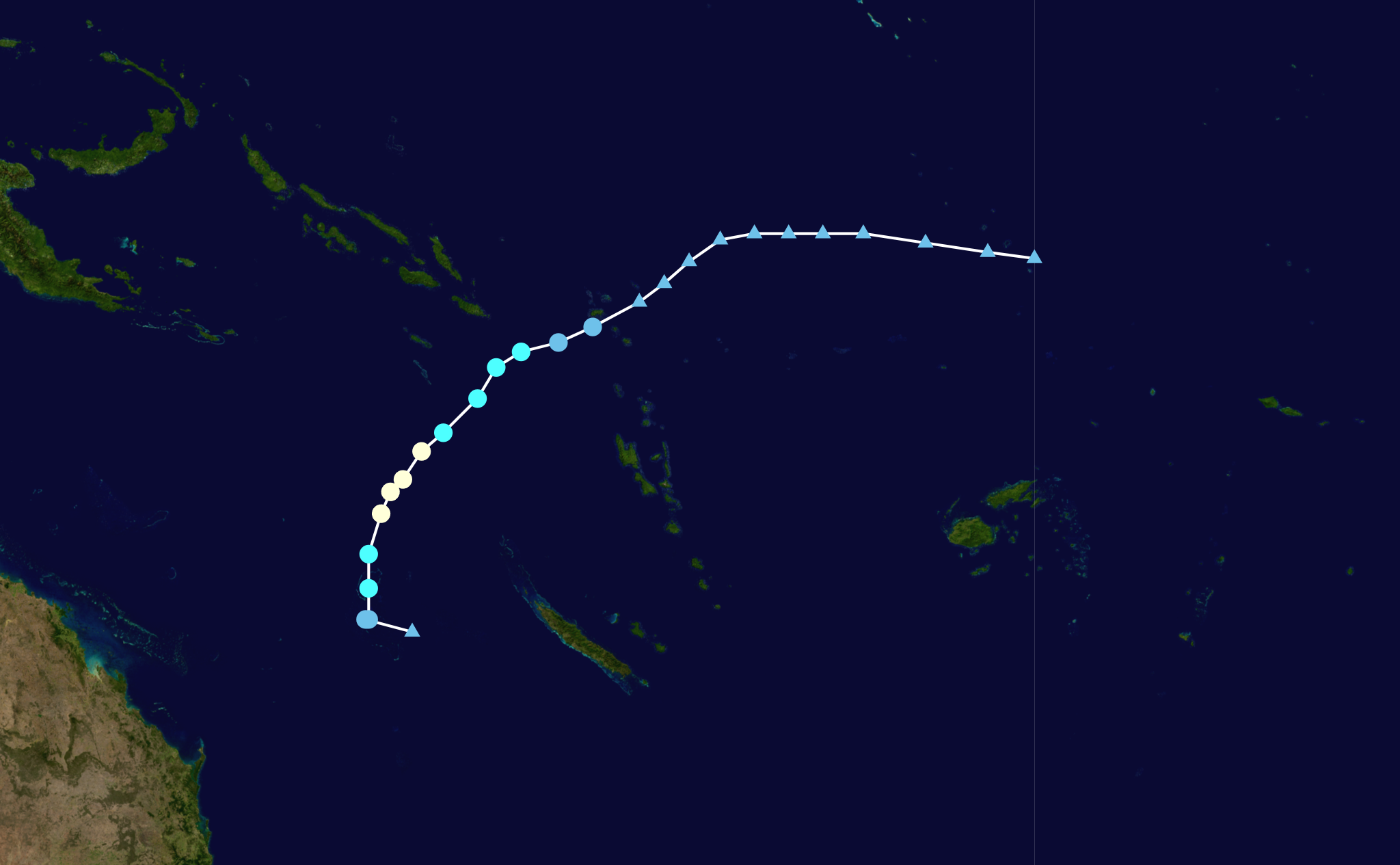
- Duration: 19 November (Entered basin) – 21 November
- Peak intensity: 110 km/h (70 mph) (10-min); 975 hPa (mbar)

On 19 November, Tropical Cyclone Nute moved into the basin on 19 November, at its peak intensity as a category 2 tropical cyclone with 10-minute sustained winds of 110 km/h (70 mph), while located around 555 km (345 mi) to the south of Honiara in the Solomon Islands. As it moved into the region, the JTWC estimated that Nate had peaked with 1-minute sustained winds of 130 km/h (80 mph), which made it equivalent to a Category 1 hurricane on the Saffir-Simpson hurricane wind scale. Over the next couple of days, Nute weakened significantly as it encountered dry air and an increasing amount of vertical wind shear, which caused its low-level circulation to become fully exposed. As a result, the JTWC issued its final advisory on the system during 20 November, before the BoM reported that Nute had dissipated during the following day.

=== Tropical Cyclone Sid ===
- Category 1 tropical cyclone (Australian scale)
- Tropical storm (SSHWS)
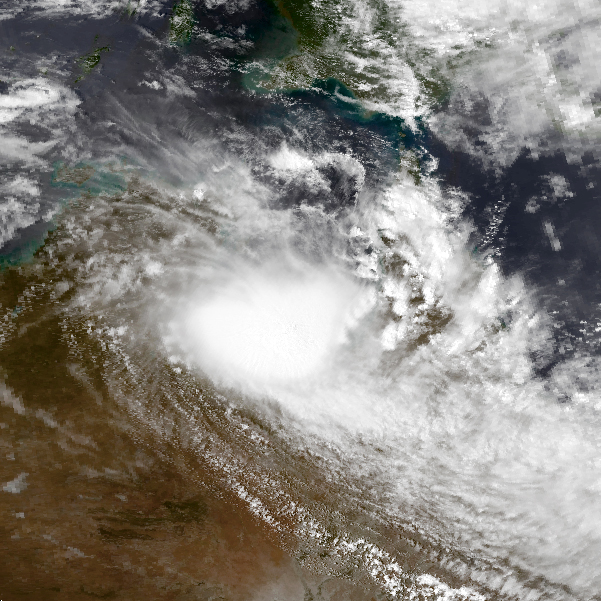
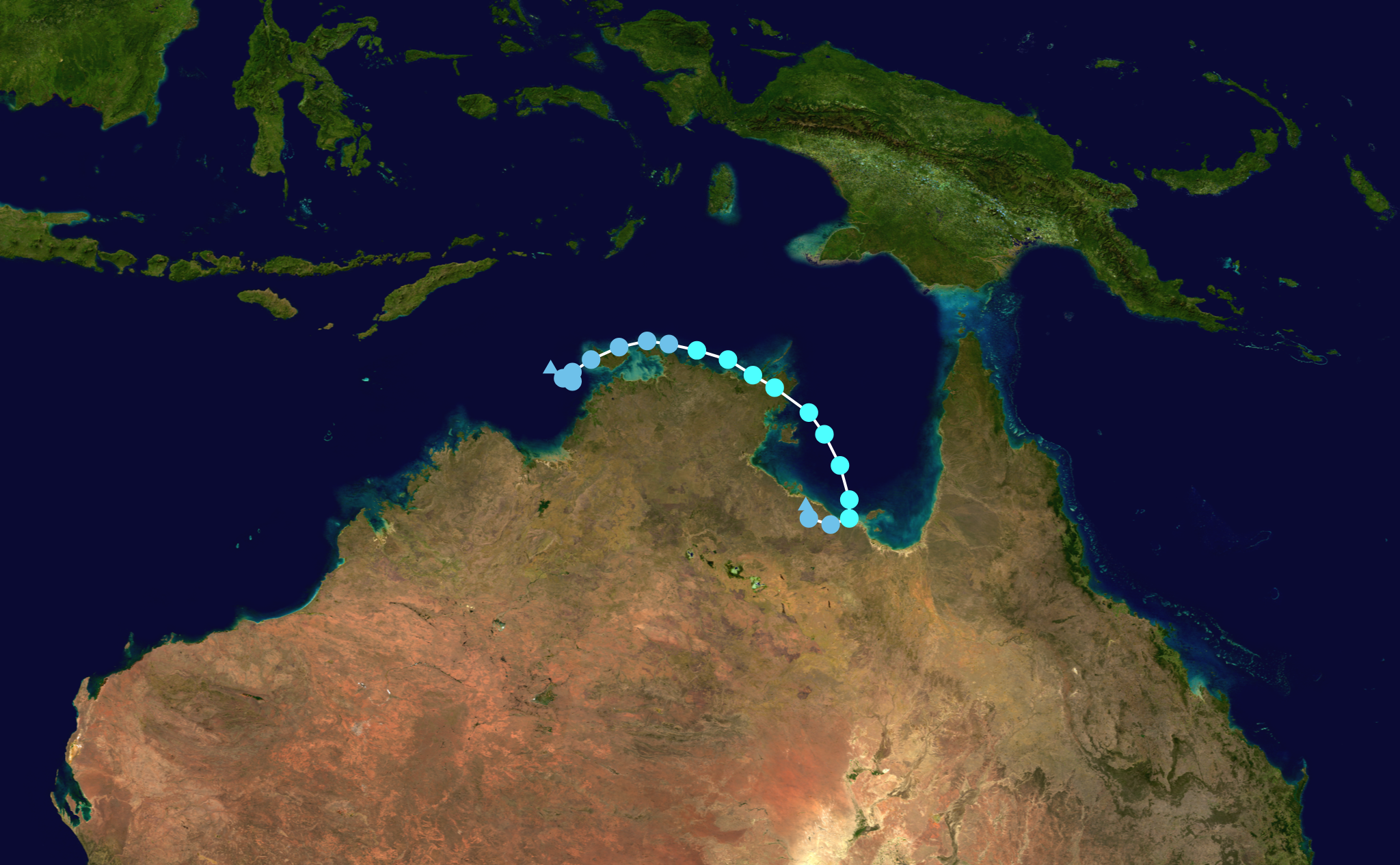
- Duration: 24 December – 29 December
- Peak intensity: 85 km/h (50 mph) (10-min); 985 hPa (mbar)

A low-pressure system formed over the Northern Territory in late December and moved into the Timor Sea as the monsoon trough developed near Australia. A tropical depression had formed on 26 December near Darwin, Australia. The storm reached gale force six hours after developing and was named Sid by the BoM. Sid moved to the east, affecting the Northern Territory. Sid turned southeastward, crossing the Northern Territory. Sid moved fully southward, in which it weakened due to wind shear. By 28 December, Sid had weakened to below gale-status and residual low meandered around for a few days.

By 3 January, the low re-entered the Western Gulf and the BoM began to re-issue advisories on the low, which was forecast to re-intensify. The low became a depression and drifted around for another day. On 4 January, scatterometer data at 1330 UTC indicated the presence of 30-35 mph winds over the water. The depression weakened back into a low on 5 January and advisories were stopped again. However, on 7 January, the TCWC in Darwin re-issued advisories for a third time and the cyclone was forecast to re-intensify, but this did not occur. The last warning was issued on the depression at 1800 UTC. The remnant low moved into the Gulf of Carpentaria and across Queensland. The TCWC in Brisbane, Australia issued bulletins on 10 January for the low which was once Sid. The low remained quasi-stationary to a couple of days near Townsville, causing major flooding in the area. The bulletins were discontinued the next day. Heavy rains fell and several rivers flooded due to the remnant low on 11 January.

=== Severe Tropical Cyclone Selwyn ===
- Category 3 severe tropical cyclone (Australian scale)
- Category 1 tropical cyclone (SSHWS)
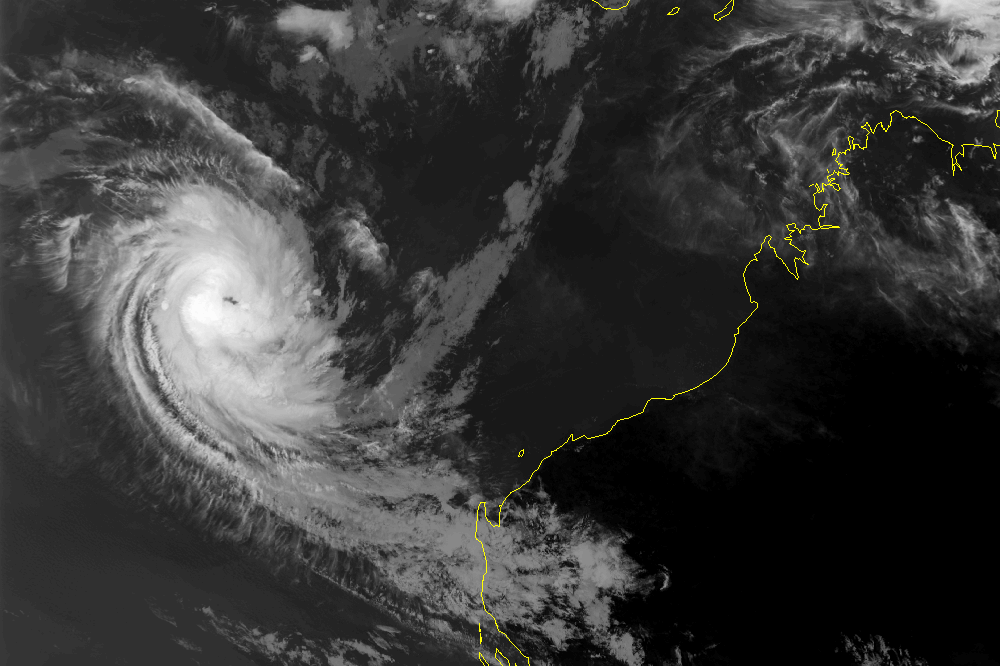
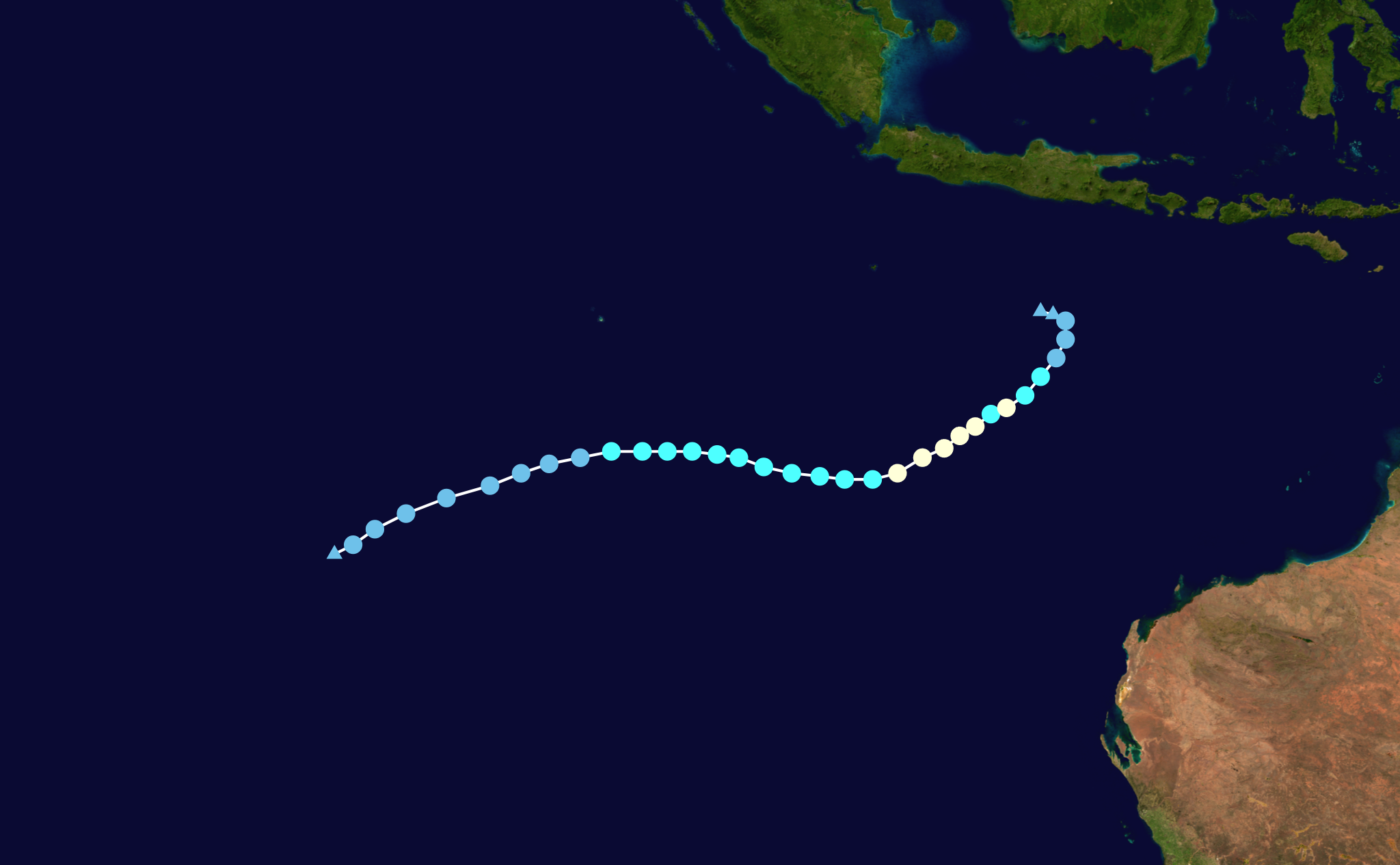
- Duration: 26 December – 2 January
- Peak intensity: 140 km/h (85 mph) (10-min); 960 hPa (mbar)

Tropical Cyclone Selwyn formed 650 kilometers east-southeast of Christmas Island within the monsoon trough. Selwyn rapidly strengthened into a tropical cyclone on 27 December and reached its maximum intensity of 70 mph (110 km/h) on 28 December. Selwyn went at a west-southwesterly motion, bringing it to a position almost 1,000 nautical miles (2,000 km) west of Broome by mid-day 29 December. After this point, Selwyn began to weaken rapidly as it moved west-northwesterly slowly. Warnings were discontinued by the Tropical Cyclone Warning Center in Perth, Australia on 31 December because winds were forecast to fall below gale-force. The remnant low drifted westward and then to the southwest with convection flaring up once in a while. Warnings were re-issued in early January due to forecasts that Selwyn would re-intensify, but this did not occur. The remnant low (formerly known as Selwyn) was tracked until 3 January.

=== Severe Tropical Cyclone Katrina ===
- Category 4 severe tropical cyclone (Australian scale)
- Category 2 tropical cyclone (SSHWS)
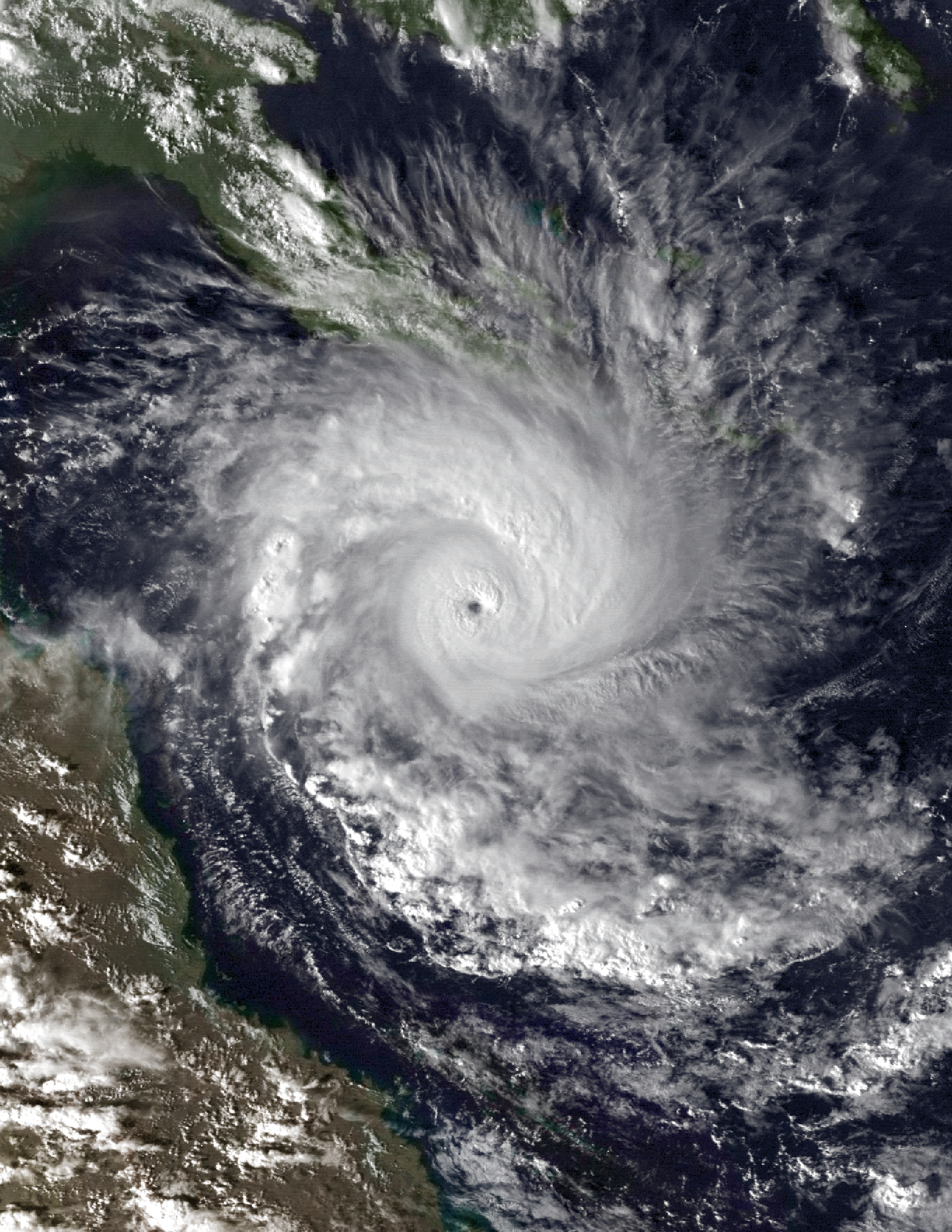
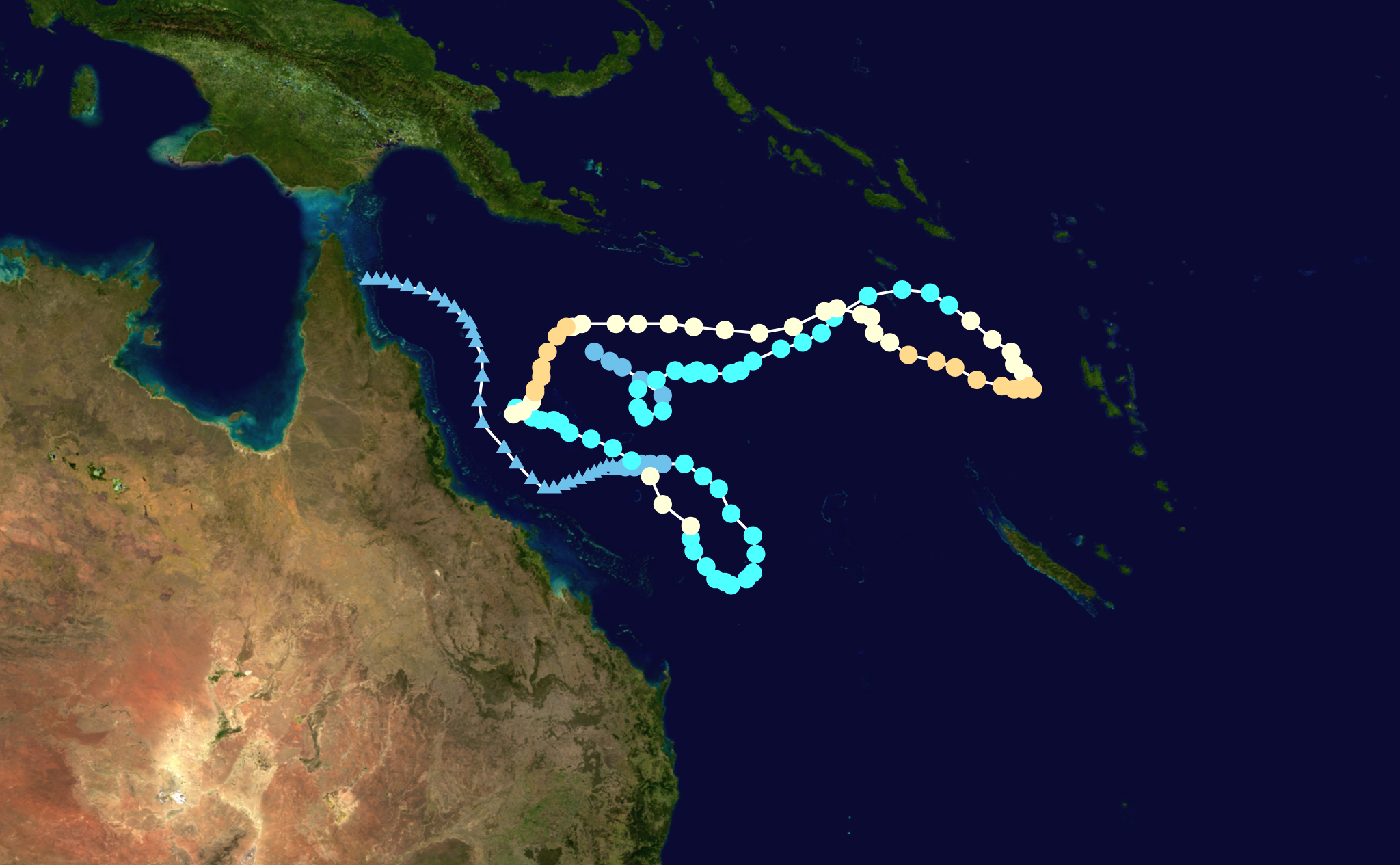
- Duration: 1 January – 24 January (Out of basin from 7–11 January)
- Peak intensity: 165 km/h (105 mph) (10-min); 940 hPa (mbar)

During 1 January, TCWC Brisbane started to monitor a tropical low, that had developed within the monsoon trough about 630 km (390 mi) to the east-northeast of Cairns in Queensland, Australia. Katrina became a tropical storm on 3 January and was moving slowly to the east-northeast. The cyclone was affected by Cyclone Susan which was 1,000 nautical miles (1,900 km) east of Katrina. On 7 January, Susan moved further south allowing Katrina to intensify as it neared the Solomon Islands, this proved to be the northernmost point of Katrina's track as the storm turned east-southeast and then southeast, fluctuating in hurricane strength. On 9 January, Cyclone Katrina threatened Vanuatu when it stalled about 200 nautical miles (370 km) west-northwest of Port Vila and reversed direction and moved west due a high pressure system. On 11 January, Katrina moved south of Rennell Island and then crossed back into the Brisbane area six hours later where it crossed the 160E on its eastward journey, then the storm turned west where it maintained that course until 15 January. On the 15th, the storm moved south-southwest where it reached Category 2 strength with a barometric pressure of 940 mbar. Katrina weakened rapidly and slowed before making a tight loop on 17 and 18 January. After completing the loop, Cyclone Katrina moved east for 12 hours before moving east-southeast for three days. During that time, Katrina briefly reached Category 1 strength once more before slowing down and being affected by wind shear. By 24 January, Katrina had weakened to a tropical depression.

=== Severe Tropical Cyclone Tiffany ===
- Category 4 severe tropical cyclone (Australian scale)
- Category 4 tropical cyclone (SSHWS)
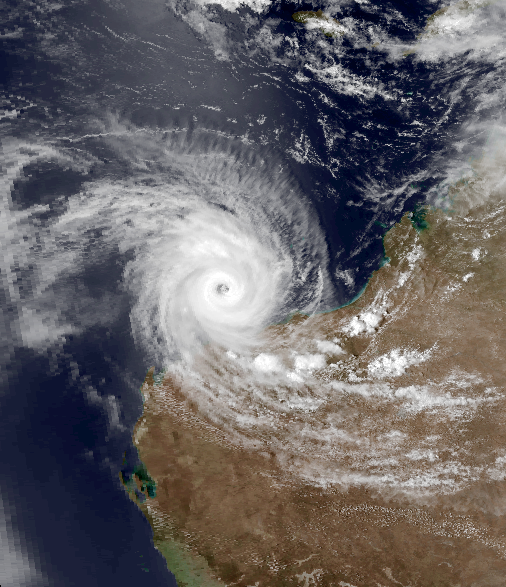
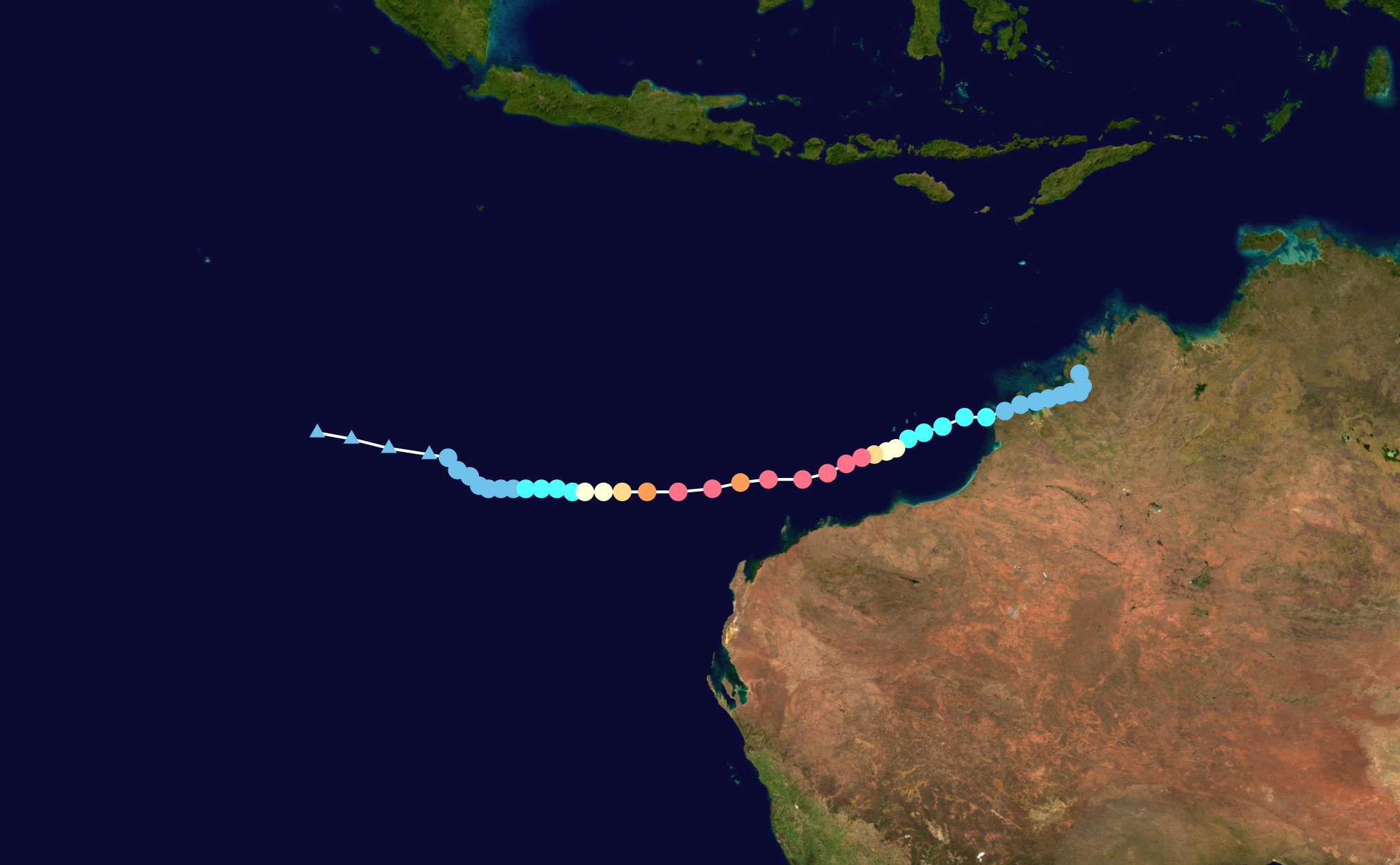
- Duration: 22 January – 31 January
- Peak intensity: 185 km/h (115 mph) (10-min); 940 hPa (mbar)

Tropical Cyclone Tiffany began as a tropical low about 1,000 nautical miles (2,000 km) northeast of Broome. TCWC in Perth, Australia started issuing advisories on the low 24 January. The system was of land origin and had entered the ocean. A brief surge of southeasterly flow helped the system strengthen and was given the name Tiffany the next day. Tiffany was a small system and strengthened rapidly with an estimated 40 mph (60 km/h) gain in a 12-hour period on 26 January. Hurricane-status was reached at 1200 UTC about 125 nautical miles (232 km) north of Port Hedland. The peak intensity of 930 millibars was recorded on 27 January with the maximum sustained winds of 105 mph (130 by the JTWC). Tiffany remained at 105 mph (169 km/h) for 18–24 hours before beginning to weaken. The cyclone went to the west-southwest, farther and farther away from the Australian coastline. By 29 January, the system fell below hurricane-status and Perth issued its last warning the next day. The Joint Typhoon Warning Center followed the next day. No damage was reported with the system.

- Australian Report for Tiffany

=== Tropical Cyclone Les ===
- Category 2 tropical cyclone (Australian scale)
- Tropical storm (SSHWS)
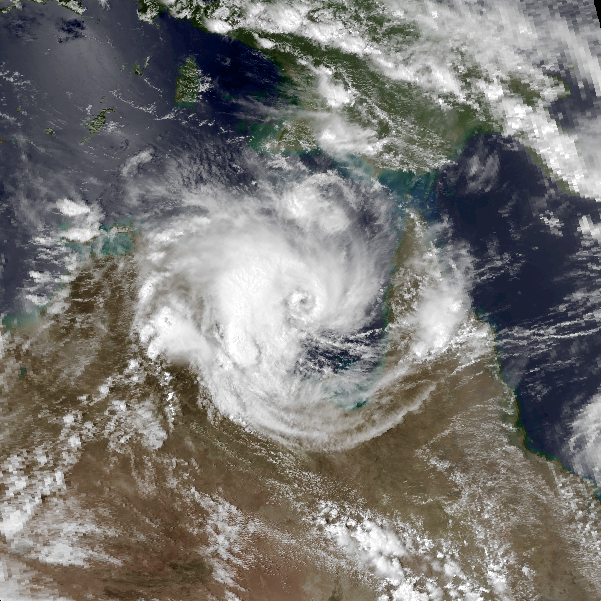
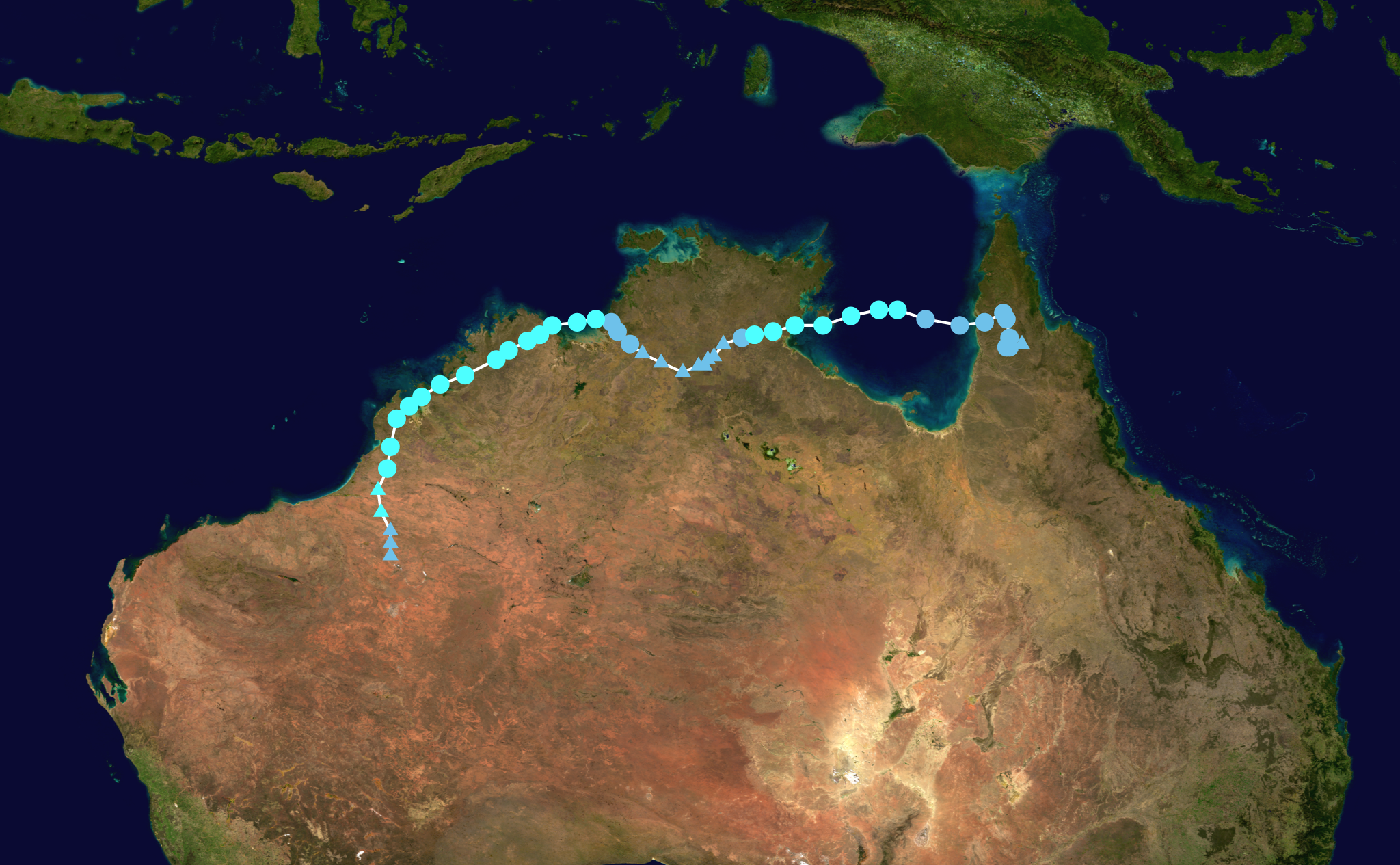
- Duration: 22 January – 1 February
- Peak intensity: 110 km/h (70 mph) (10-min); 976 hPa (mbar)

Les formed on 23 January 1998 near Darwin, Australia. The storm moved westward reaching Category 1 status before making landfall on the eastern gulf coast of the Northern Territory. Moving back out over the Timor Sea, Les hugged the coast and regained strength before making a second landfall and dissipating. Les caused extensive flooding and damage in the town of Katherine and there was one death.

=== Severe Tropical Cyclone Victor–Cindy ===
- Category 3 severe tropical cyclone (Australian scale)
- Category 2 tropical cyclone (SSHWS)
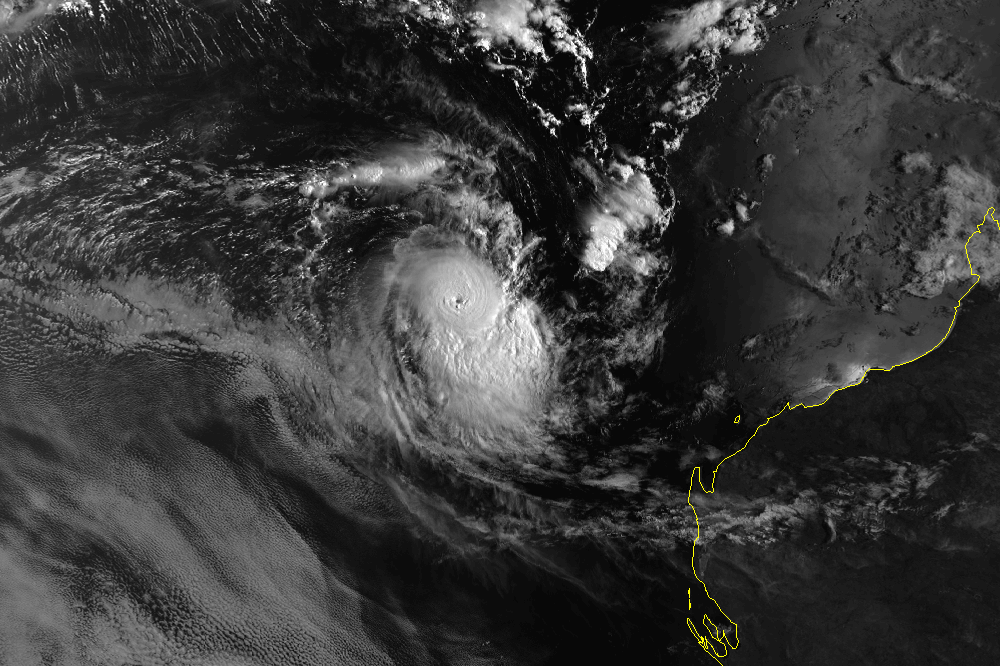
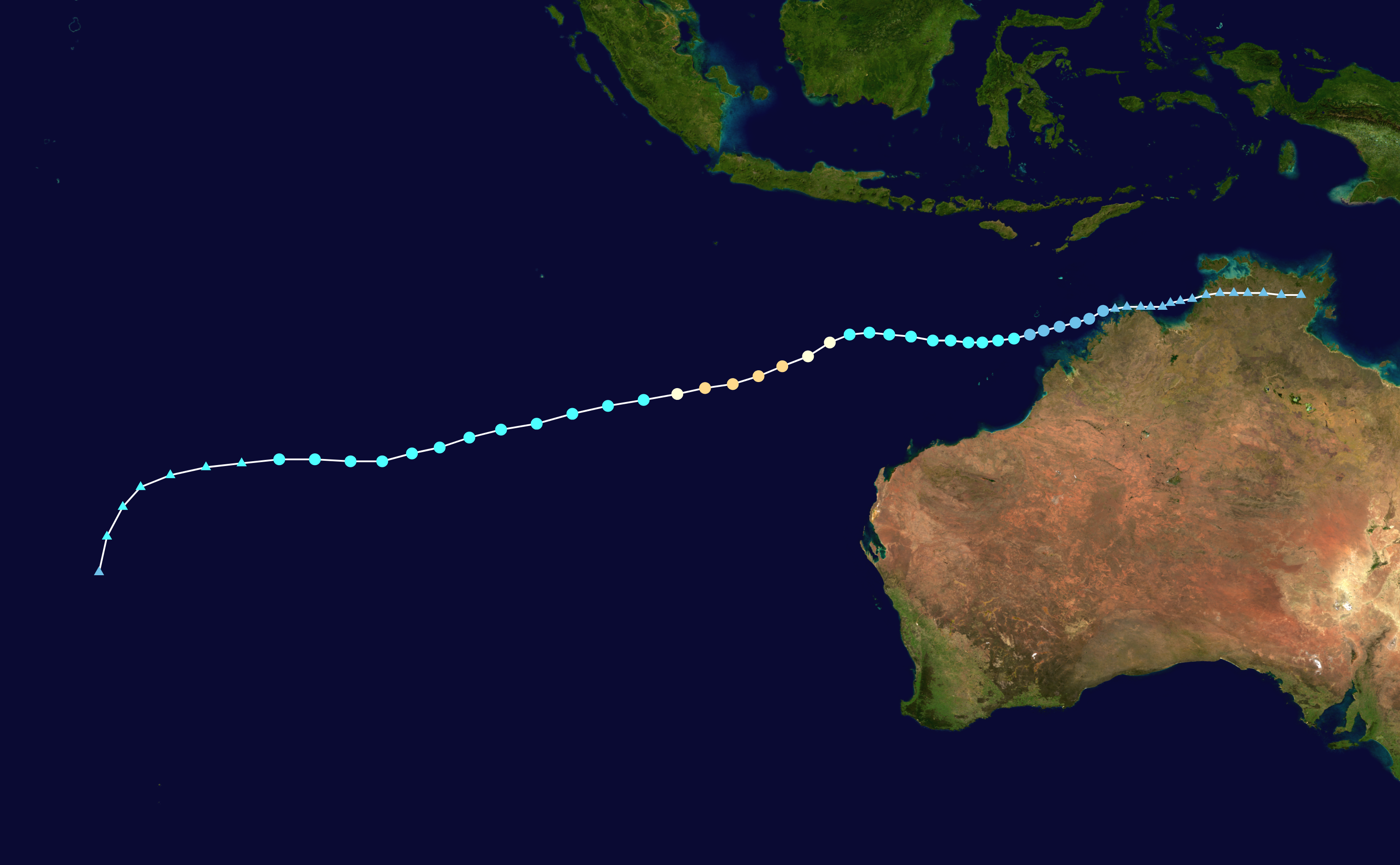
- Duration: 8 February – 17 February (Exited basin)
- Peak intensity: 155 km/h (100 mph) (10-min); 975 hPa (mbar)

The tropical low that was to become Severe Tropical Cyclone Victor-Cindy was first noted over Australia's Top End by the BoM on 5 February 1998 and was presumed to have formed out of the remnants of Severe Tropical Cyclone Katrina. Over the next couple of days, the system moved westwards over the Top End under the influence of a subtropical ridge of high pressure and emerged into the Indian Ocean to the north of Western Australia's Kimberley region.

However, its organization improved significantly on 9 February, as it moved west-southwest away from the north Kimberley coast. An LNG tanker reported 40-knot winds near the center during the late afternoon of 10 February, and the storm was named Victor that night. It continued to move westward and remained weak during 11 February, but intensified during 12 February. An eye became visible during the morning of 13 February, as Victor reached peak intensity. Victor continued west-southwestward but then progressively weakened. By the morning of 15 February, the cyclone was sheared, with a fully exposed low-level center apparent on satellite imagery. Victor was a small cyclone for its whole lifetime and was surrounded by very high environmental pressures.

As Victor accelerated towards a west-southwest direction on the edge of a subtropical high, it crossed the 90th meridian east early on 16 February, subsequently being briefly renamed by Mauritius as Tropical Cyclone Cindy. Later that day, the Regional Specialised Meteorological Centre in Réunion (RSMC La Reunion) downgraded Cindy to a tropical disturbance. Cindy continued to lose its convection and vorticity until 19 February, when RSMC La Reunion reported that the cyclone dissipated, after having recurved to the south towards a polar trough.

The time period from the initial formation of the low in the Coral Sea, until it could no longer be identified as a low in the south-central Indian Ocean was 51 days.

=== Tropical Cyclone May ===
- Category 1 tropical cyclone (Australian scale)
- Tropical storm (SSHWS)
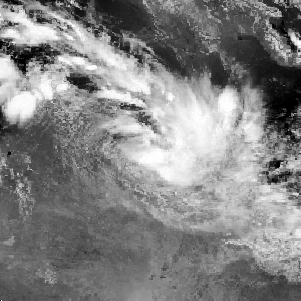
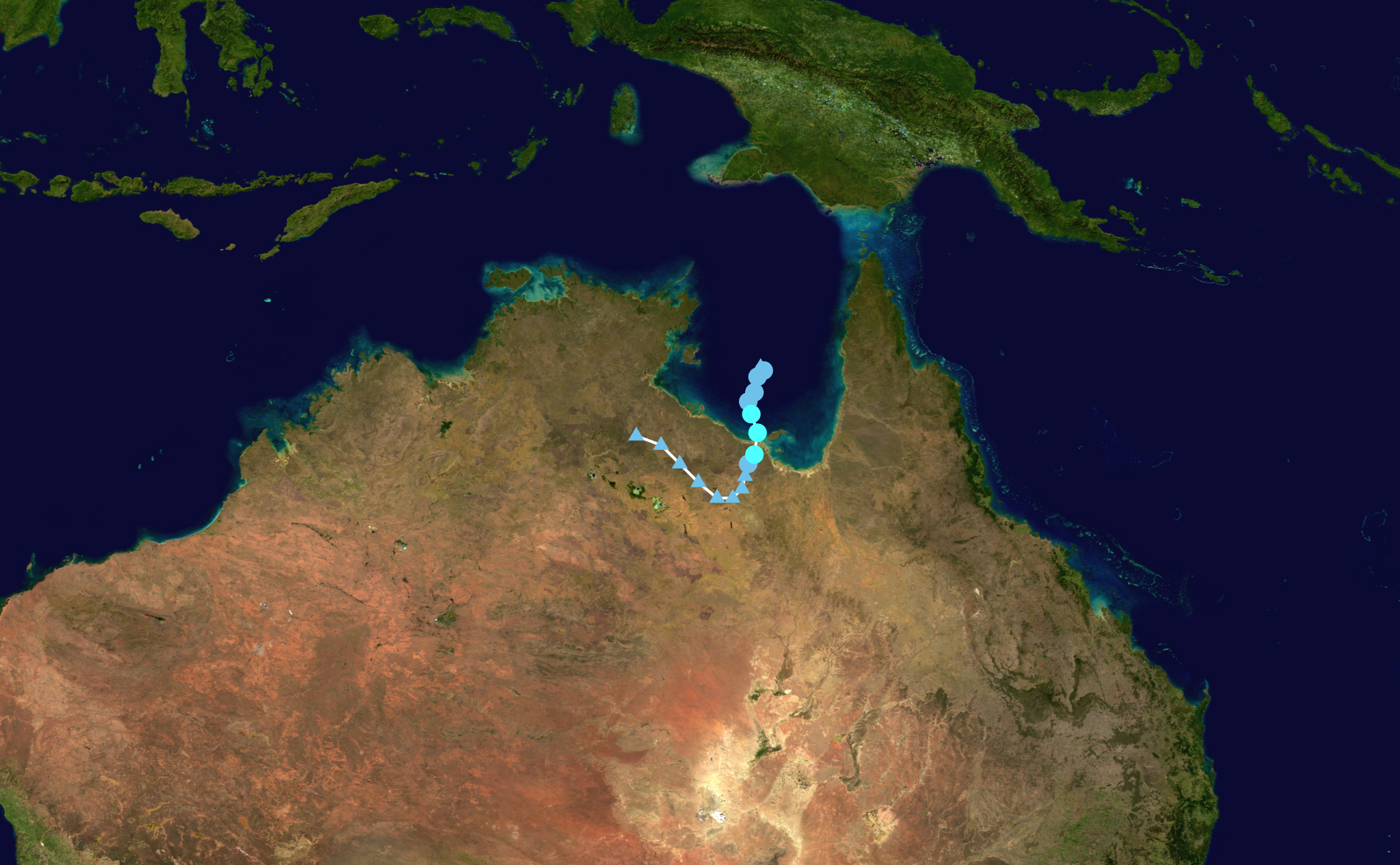
- Duration: 25 February – 26 February
- Peak intensity: 75 km/h (45 mph) (10-min); 990 hPa (mbar)

May formed from an area of low pressure on 25 February 1998 near the Australian coast. May moved southward before making landfall near Mornington Island on 26 February. After that the storm dissipated while moving inland. There were no reports of deaths or damage from Tropical Cyclone May.

=== Tropical Low Elsie ===
- Tropical low (Australian scale)
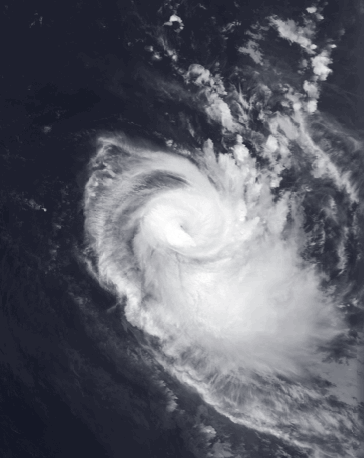
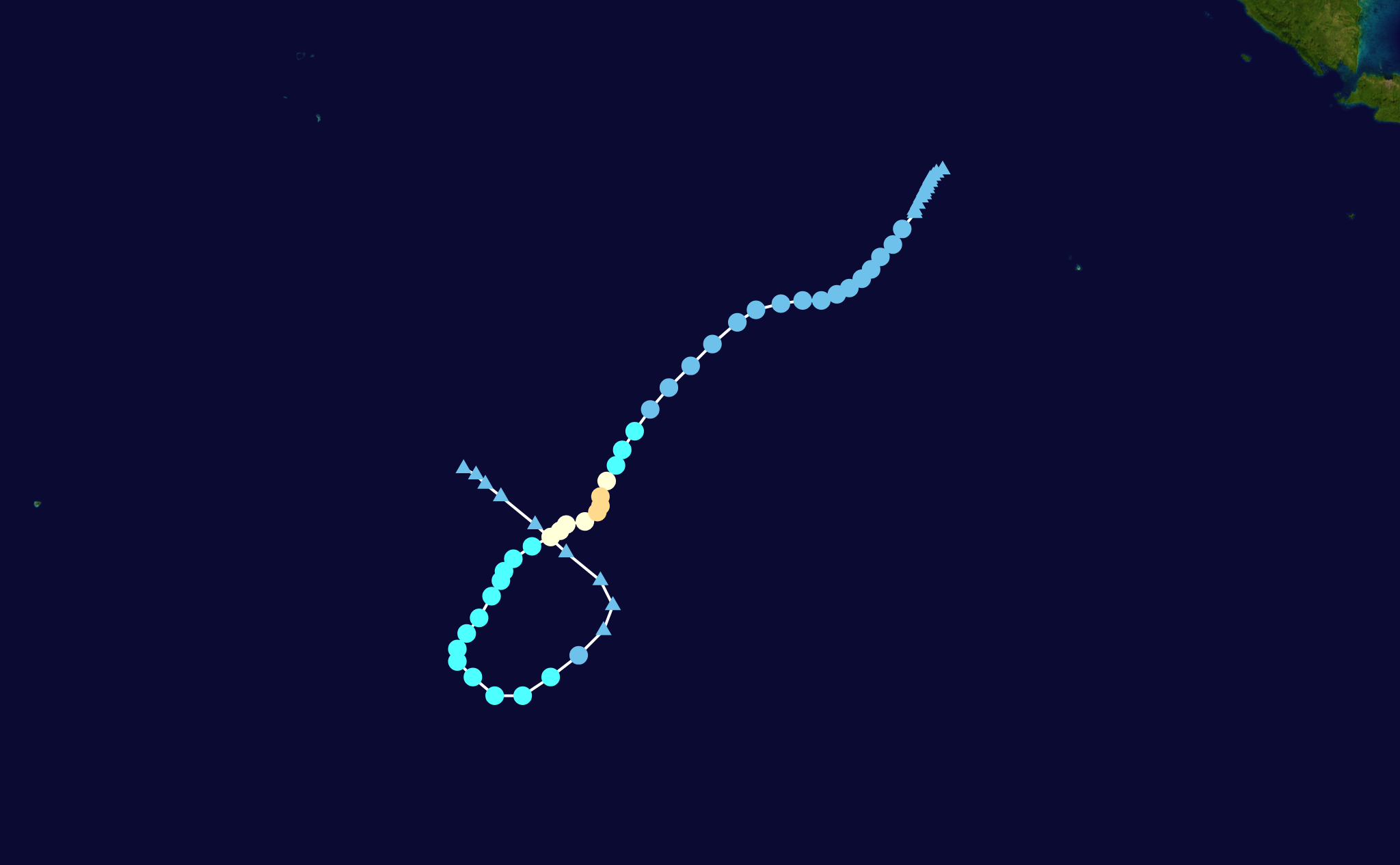
- Duration: 7 March – 9 March (Exited basin)
- Peak intensity: 35 km/h (25 mph) (10-min);

A low pressure area was spotted west of the Cocos Islands on 7 March. The system tracked westward and then southwestward over the next few days, remaining poorly organized. It crossed 90°E in the night of 8–9 March and left the Australian basin.

=== Tropical Cyclone Nathan ===
- Category 2 tropical cyclone (Australian scale)
- Category 1 tropical cyclone (SSHWS)
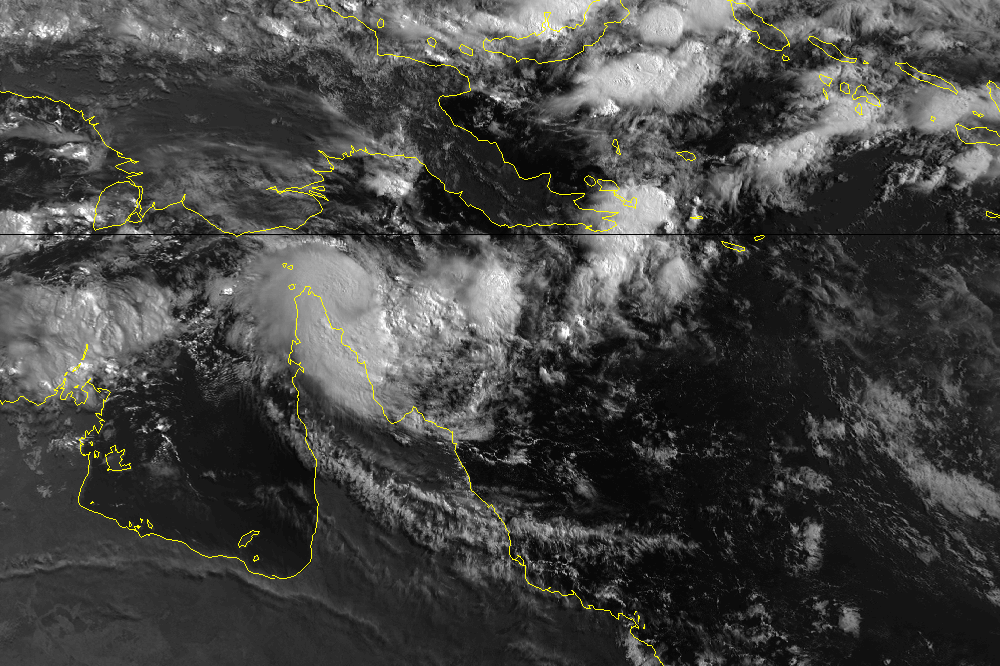
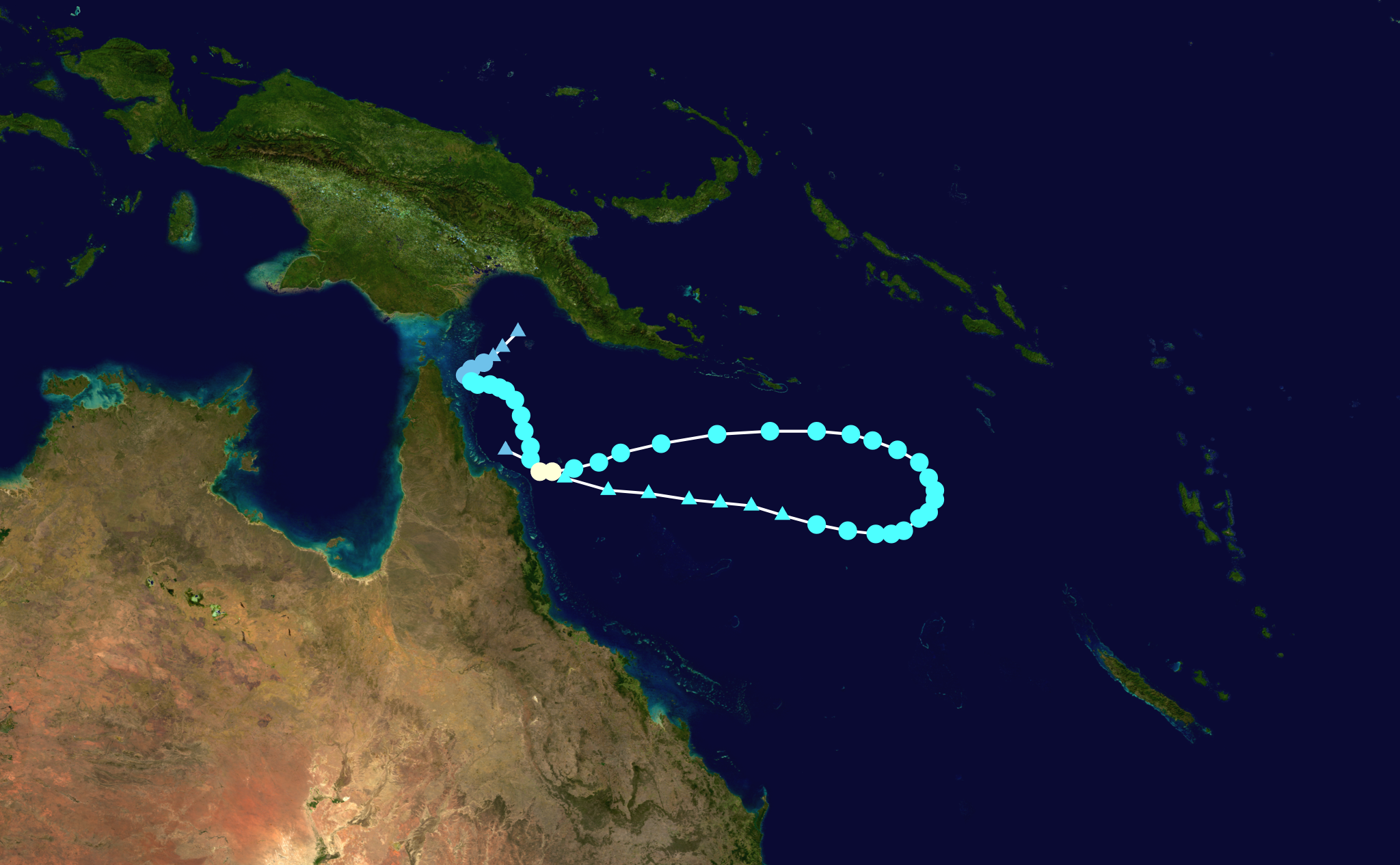
- Duration: 20 March – 26 March
- Peak intensity: 95 km/h (60 mph) (10-min); 990 hPa (mbar)

Tropical Cyclone Nathan formed from a tropical low embedded weak monsoon trough that had formed when Tropical Cyclone Yali had reached cyclone intensity. Upper-level outflow was favorable, but wind shear made it restricted for rapid development. Nathan started off developing rapidly, the first warning, issued on 21 March, classified the system as a 45 mph (72 km/h) tropical cyclone. Nathan was a small system in an environment of weak steering flow, causing the storm to move erratically but slowly to the east. Nathan turned southward, coming to within 100 nautical miles (190 km) of Cooktown, Australia on 23 March. The TCWC in Brisbane kept Nathan's wind speed at 50-60 mph, whereas the Joint Typhoon Warning Center boosted it up to hurricane-strength on 23 March.

After approaching the coast of Queensland, Nathan came under the influence of the monsoon flow from Tropical Cyclone Yali. The storm moved east-northeasterly very rapidly and became more easterly on 25 March. By the morning of 26 March, the circulation was becoming sheared. The shear was possibly coming from an extratropical system (formerly known as Yali). Nathan turned to the south and the Brisbane TCWC downgraded the system into a tropical low, ceasing advisories. By 1200 UTC on 27 March, Nathan showed signs of redevelopment near the Chesterfield Islands. The JTWC reissued advisories and upped the winds to 50 mph (80 km/h). Nathan moved westward and approached Australia again, weakening slowly.

A scatterometer pass on 29 March indicated a small circulation with winds of about 40 mph (60 km/h) and a Willis Island report the next day indicated that Nathan only had 35 mph (56 km/h) easterly winds. The JTWC kept Nathan as a minimal tropical cyclone until 31 March when it was downgraded into a weakening low.

=== Tropical Low 35S ===
- Tropical low (Australian scale)
- Tropical storm (SSHWS)
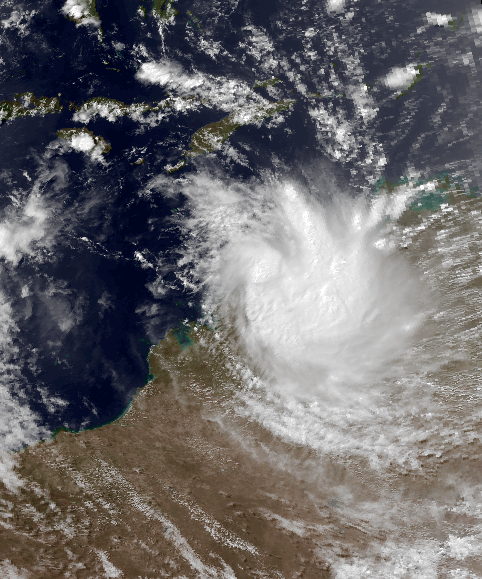
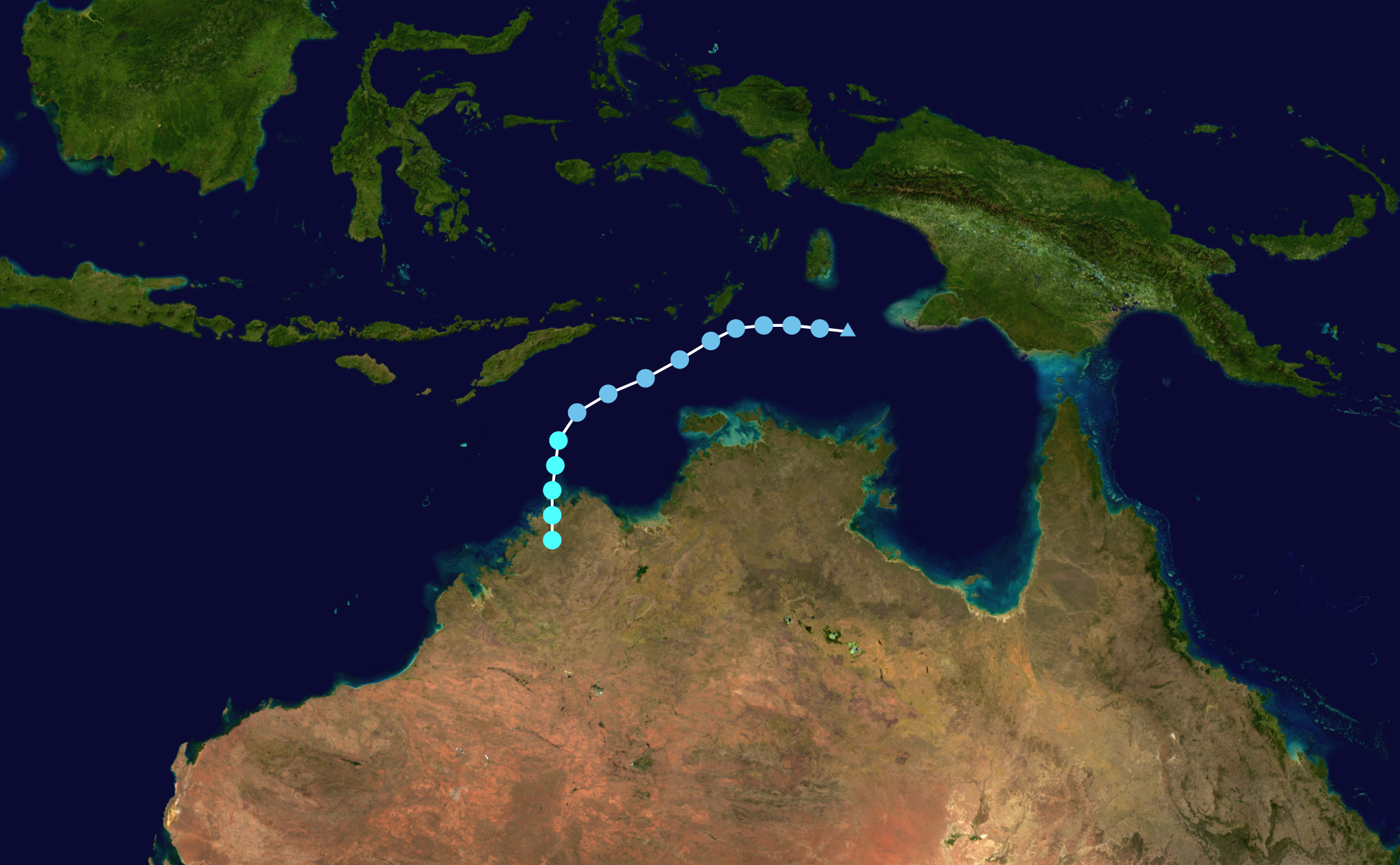
- Duration: 16 April – 19 April
- Peak intensity: 65 km/h (40 mph) (10-min); 1002 hPa (mbar)

A low formed off the coast of Australia on 16 April 1998. The depression moved southwestward before making landfall in Western Australia on the 19th. There were reports of heavy rain but no report of damage or deaths from the unnamed storm.

=== Other systems ===
During 25 March the JTWC, RSMC Nadi and TCWC Brisbane reported that Cyclone Yali had moved into the Australian region from the South Pacific basin. However, RSMC Nadi and TCWC Brisbane both treated the system as a post tropical cyclone, after an upper cut-off low had captured the cyclone had caused Yali to lose its tropical characteristics.

== Storm names ==
Tropical cyclones are assigned names by the Australian Bureau of Meteorology or Papua New Guinea. Tropical cyclones are named if they are non-frontal low pressure systems of synoptic scale developing over warm waters, or if Dvorak intensity analysis indicate the presence of gale force or stronger winds near the centre. Therefore, tropical systems with gales in one or more quadrants, but not near the centre, are not named. All names assigned in the Australian region are selected sequentially. Only the names used during this cyclone season are listed below. The complete list of names for each basin are found in the World Meteorological Organization's official lists.

Each Australian Tropical Cyclone Warning Centre (Perth, Darwin, and Brisbane) maintains a list of names arranged alphabetically and alternating male and female. Tropical cyclones that develop in the South-East Indian Ocean are assigned names by the Tropical Cyclone Warning Centre in Perth. This region includes the areas east of 90°E, south of the Equator, and west of 125°E. Tropical cyclones that develop south of the Equator between 125°E and 141°E are assigned names by the Tropical Cyclone Warning Centre in Darwin, Northern Territory. This area includes most of the cyclones that form in the Arafura Sea and Western Gulf of Carpentaria. Tropical cyclones in the Coral Sea and Eastern Gulf of Carpentaria between 141°E and 160°E and south of 10°S are assigned names by the Tropical Cyclone Warning Centre in Brisbane, Queensland.

Perth

- Selwyn – Tiffany – Victor

Darwin

- Sid

Brisbane

- Katrina – Les – May – Nathan

The Bureau of Meteorology retired the names Katrina and Sid, replacing them with Kitty and Samuel respectively. However, neither name was retained when the naming lists were combined in 2008.

== Season effects ==
Name	Dates	Peak intensity			Areas affected	Damage (USD)	Deaths	Ref(s).
Name	Dates	Category	Wind speed	Pressure	Areas affected	Damage (USD)	Deaths	Ref(s).
Nute	19 – 21 November	Category 2 tropical cyclone	110 km/h (70 mph)	975 hPa (28.79 inHg)	None	None	None	
Sid	24 – 29 December	Category 1 tropical cyclone	85 km/h (50 mph)	985 hPa (29.09 inHg)	Northern Territory	$100 million	1	
Les	21 January – 2 February	Category 2 tropical cyclone	110 km/h (70 mph)	976 hPa (28.82 inHg)	Northern Australia	Unknown	Unknown	
May	7 – 10 February	Category 1 tropical cyclone	75 km/h (45 mph)	990 hPa (29.23 inHg)	Northern Territory	Unknown	Unknown	
Nathan	19 – 30 March	Category 2 tropical cyclone	95 km/h (60 mph)	990 hPa (29.23 inHg)	Queensland	None	None	
35S	16 – 19 April 1998	Tropical low	Not Specified	Not Specified	Western Australia	Unknown	Unknown	

== See also ==
- List of Southern Hemisphere tropical cyclone seasons
- Atlantic hurricane seasons: 1997, 1998
- Pacific hurricane seasons: 1997, 1998
- Pacific typhoon seasons: 1997, 1998
- North Indian Ocean cyclone seasons: 1997, 1998
