= Timeline of the 1997 Atlantic hurricane season =

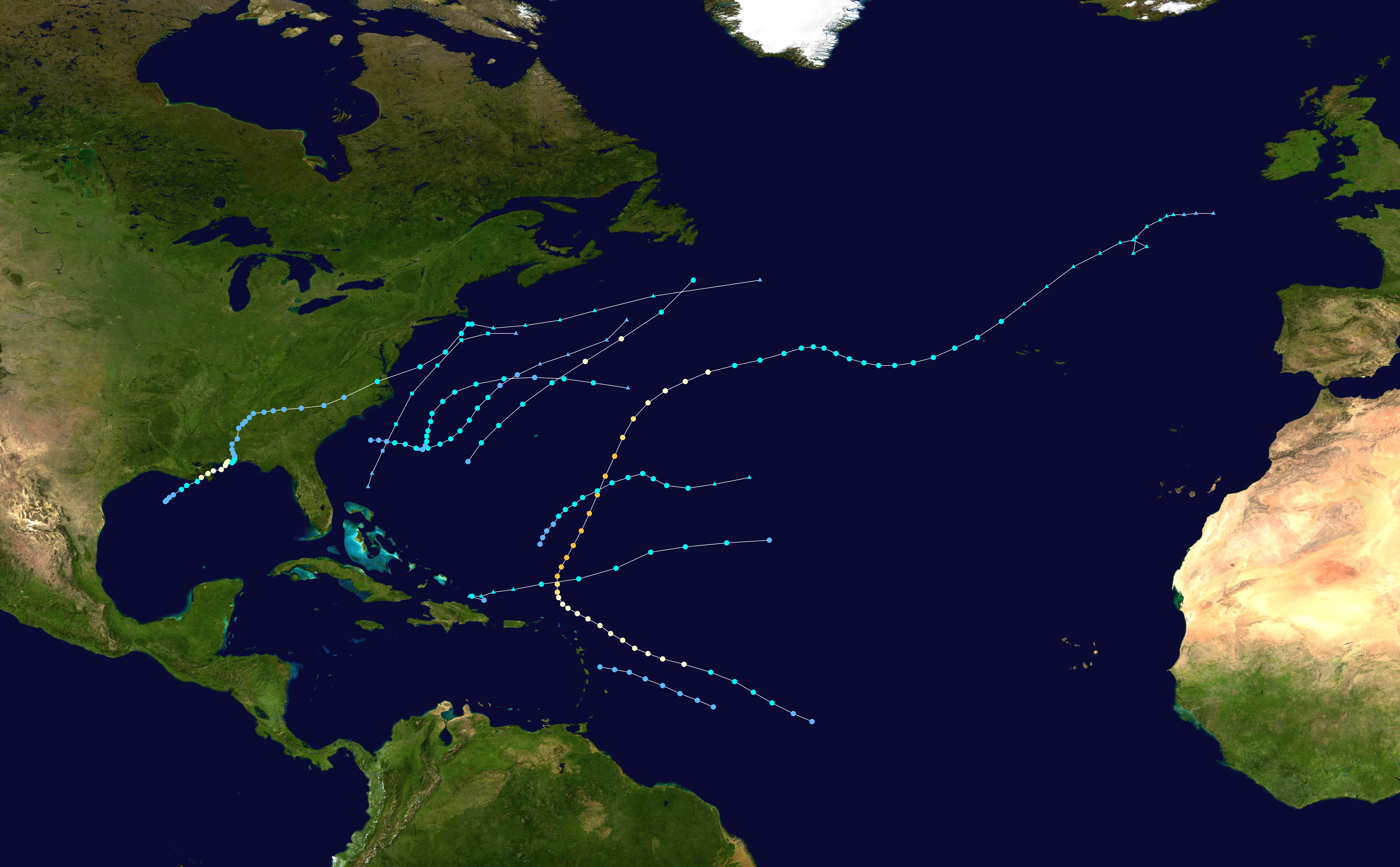
- Season summary map

Season boundaries
- First system formed: June 1, 1997
- Last system dissipated: October 17, 1997

Strongest system
- Name: Erika
- Maximum winds: 125 mph (205 km/h) (1-minute sustained)
- Lowest pressure: 946 mbar (hPa; 27.94 inHg)

Longest lasting system
- Name: Erika
- Duration: 12.75 days
Storm articles
- Hurricane Danny (1997)
- Hurricane Erika (1997)

The 1997 Atlantic hurricane season was the annual cycle of tropical cyclone formation over the Atlantic Ocean north of the equator. The season officially began on June 1 and ended on November 30. This is historically the period during which most subtropical or tropical cyclogenesis occurs over the Atlantic Ocean. The first system was a subtropical storm that formed on June 1; the final system, Tropical Storm Grace, dissipated on October 17.

Though below average overall, (Note: The 1997 Atlantic hurricane season produced eight tropical or subtropical storms, with three becoming hurricanes and one of those further strengthening into a major hurricane. At the time, an average season comprised ten tropical storms, six hurricanes, and two major hurricanes.) the 1997 season had an unusually busy start. Through the end of July, six tropical or subtropical depressions developed, of which five became named storms (Note: This includes the unnamed subtropical storm.) and two strengthened further into hurricanes. At the time, Hurricane Danny was the earliest-forming fifth-named storm in the Atlantic basin. After Danny dissipated, the season was exceptionally quiet. There was no tropical cyclone activity for the entire month of August, typically one of the basin's peak months; this was the first time since 1961, and did not happen again until 2022. Only three more systems formed for the remainder of the season: Hurricane Erika in September, which was the only Atlantic major hurricane in 1997; (Note: A major hurricane is an Atlantic or Pacific hurricane that reaches Category 3 or higher on the five-level Saffir–Simpson scale, with maximum sustained winds of at least 111 mph (179 km/h).) and two weak tropical storms in October.

This timeline documents tropical cyclone formations, strengthening, weakening, landfalls, extratropical transitions, and dissipations during the season. It includes information that was not released throughout the season, meaning that data from post-storm reviews by the National Hurricane Center, such as a storm that was not initially warned upon, has been included.

The time stamp for each event is first stated using Coordinated Universal Time (UTC), the 24-hour clock where 00:00 = midnight UTC. The NHC uses both UTC and the time zone where the center of the tropical cyclone is currently located. The time zones utilized (east to west) prior to 2020 were: Atlantic, Eastern, and Central. In this timeline, the respective area time is included in parentheses. Additionally, figures for maximum sustained winds and position estimates are rounded to the nearest 5 units (miles, or kilometers), following National Hurricane Center practice. Direct wind observations are rounded to the nearest whole number. Atmospheric pressures are listed to the nearest millibar and nearest hundredth of an inch of mercury.

== Timeline of events ==
=== June ===
June 1

Track map of the unnumbered subtropical storm

- The 1997 Atlantic hurricane season officially begins.
- 06:00 UTC (2:00 a.m. EDT) at 31.2°N 76.3°W – A subtropical depression forms from an area of low pressure off the Atlantic coast of the Southeastern United States.
- 12:00 UTC (8:00 a.m. EDT) at 33.2°N 75.3°W – The recently formed subtropical depression strengthens into a subtropical storm while moving north-northeastward and attains a minimum central pressure of 1003 mbar (29.62 inHg).
- 18:00 UTC (2:00 p.m. EDT) at 35.5°N 74.1°W – The subtropical storm reaches maximum sustained winds of 50 mph (85 km/h) off the coast of North Carolina.

June 2

- 18:00 UTC (2:00 p.m. AST) at 40.0°N 66.3°W – The subtropical storm weakens below gale force and transitions into an extratropical cyclone southeast of the New England coast; it dissipates within the next six hours.

June 30

- 12:00 UTC (8:00 a.m. EDT) at 32.0°N 77.2°W – A tropical depression forms from an area of low pressure off the coast of South Carolina.

=== July ===
July 1

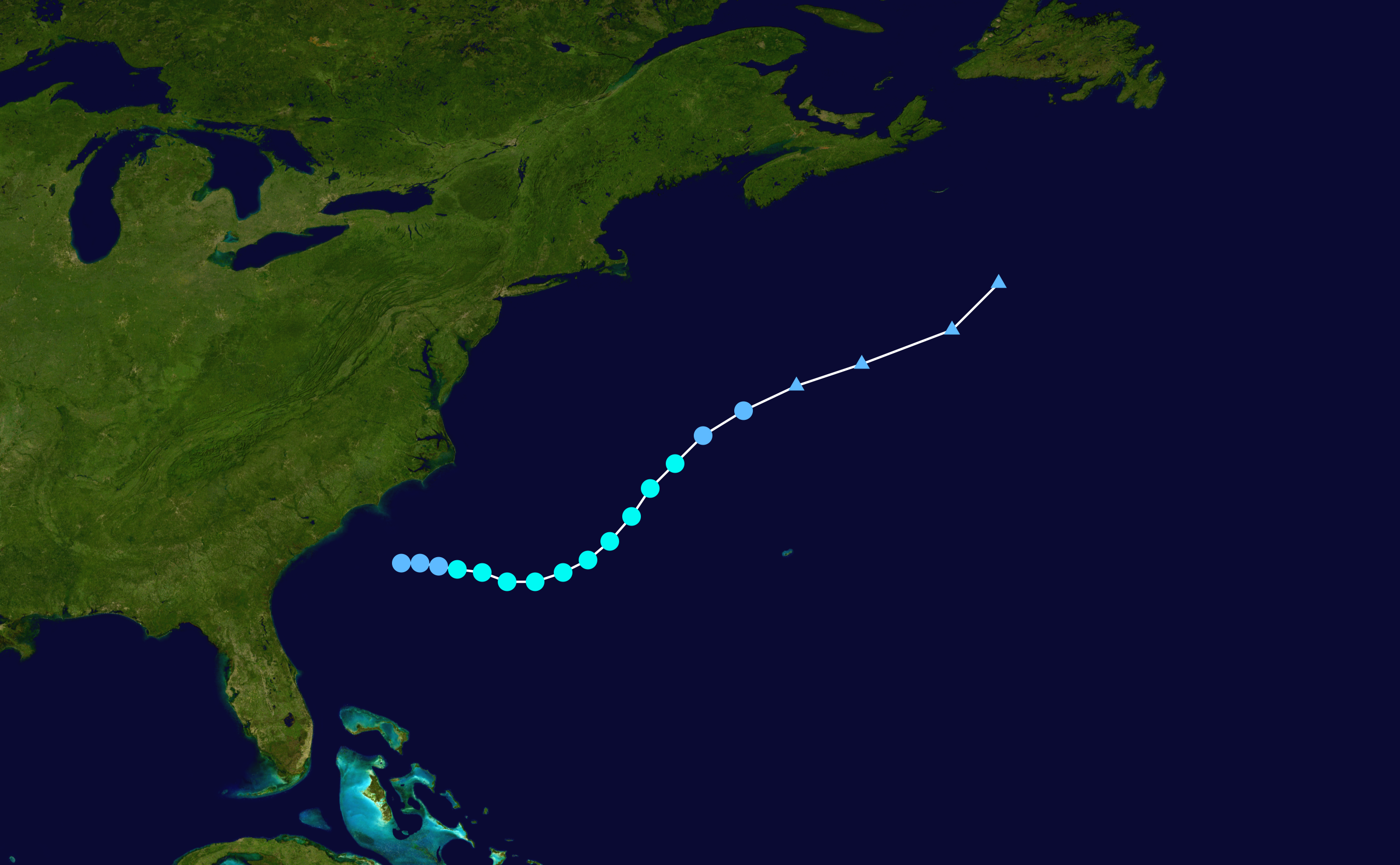
Track map of Tropical Storm Ana

- 06:00 UTC (2:00 a.m. EDT) at 31.8°N 75.4°W – The recently formed tropical depression strengthens into Tropical Storm Ana while moving eastward.

July 2

- 00:00 UTC (8:00 p.m. EDT, July 1) at 31.4°N 72.9°W – Tropical Storm Ana reaches its peak intensity, with maximum sustained winds of 45 mph (75 km/h) and a minimum central pressure of 1000 mbar (29.53 inHg), about midway between South Carolina and Bermuda.

July 3

- 18:00 UTC (2:00 p.m. AST) at 36.1°N 67.5°W – Tropical Storm Ana weakens into a tropical depression about 305 mi (490 km) north-northwest of Bermuda.

July 4

- 06:00 UTC (2:00 a.m. AST) at 37.7°N 64.5°W – Tropical Depression Ana transitions into an extratropical cyclone about 375 mi (600 km) north of Bermuda and later dissipates.

July 11

- 06:00 UTC (2:00 a.m. AST) at 30.4°N 69.9°W – A tropical depression forms from an area of low pressure about 335 mi (535 km) west-southwest of Bermuda.
- 12:00 UTC (8:00 a.m. AST) at 31.8°N 68.9°W – The recently formed tropical depression strengthens into Tropical Storm Bill about 245 mi (400 km) west of Bermuda.

July 12

Satellite image of Hurricane Bill at peak intensity on July 12

- 12:00 UTC (8:00 a.m. AST) at 37.9°N 61.1°W – Tropical Storm Bill strengthens into a Category 1 hurricane on the Saffir–Simpson scale about 435 mi (705 km) north-northeast of Bermuda.
- 15:00 UTC (11:00 a.m. AST) at 38.8°N 60.0°W – Hurricane Bill reaches its peak intensity, with maximum sustained winds of 75 mph (120 km/h) and a minimum central pressure of 986 mbar (29.12 inHg), about 520 mi (835 km) north-northeast of Bermuda.

July 13

- 00:00 UTC (8:00 p.m. AST, July 12) at 41.6°N 55.4°W – Hurricane Bill weakens into a tropical storm well south of Newfoundland.
- 06:00 UTC (2:00 a.m. AST) at 44.0°N 53.0°W – Tropical Storm Bill is absorbed by a cold front just south of the Avalon Peninsula of Newfoundland. (Note: The Atlantic hurricane database (HURDAT) maintains Tropical Storm Bill as a distinct tropical cyclone at 06:00 UTC on July 13.)
- 06:00 UTC (2:00 a.m. EDT) at 31.3°N 73.3°W – The same cold front spawns a tropical depression about 300 mi (480 km) south-southeast of Cape Hatteras, North Carolina.
- 18:00 UTC (2:00 p.m. EDT) at 31.9°N 73.0°W – The recently formed tropical depression strengthens into Tropical Storm Claudette about 270 mi (435 km) south-southeast of Cape Hatteras.

July 14

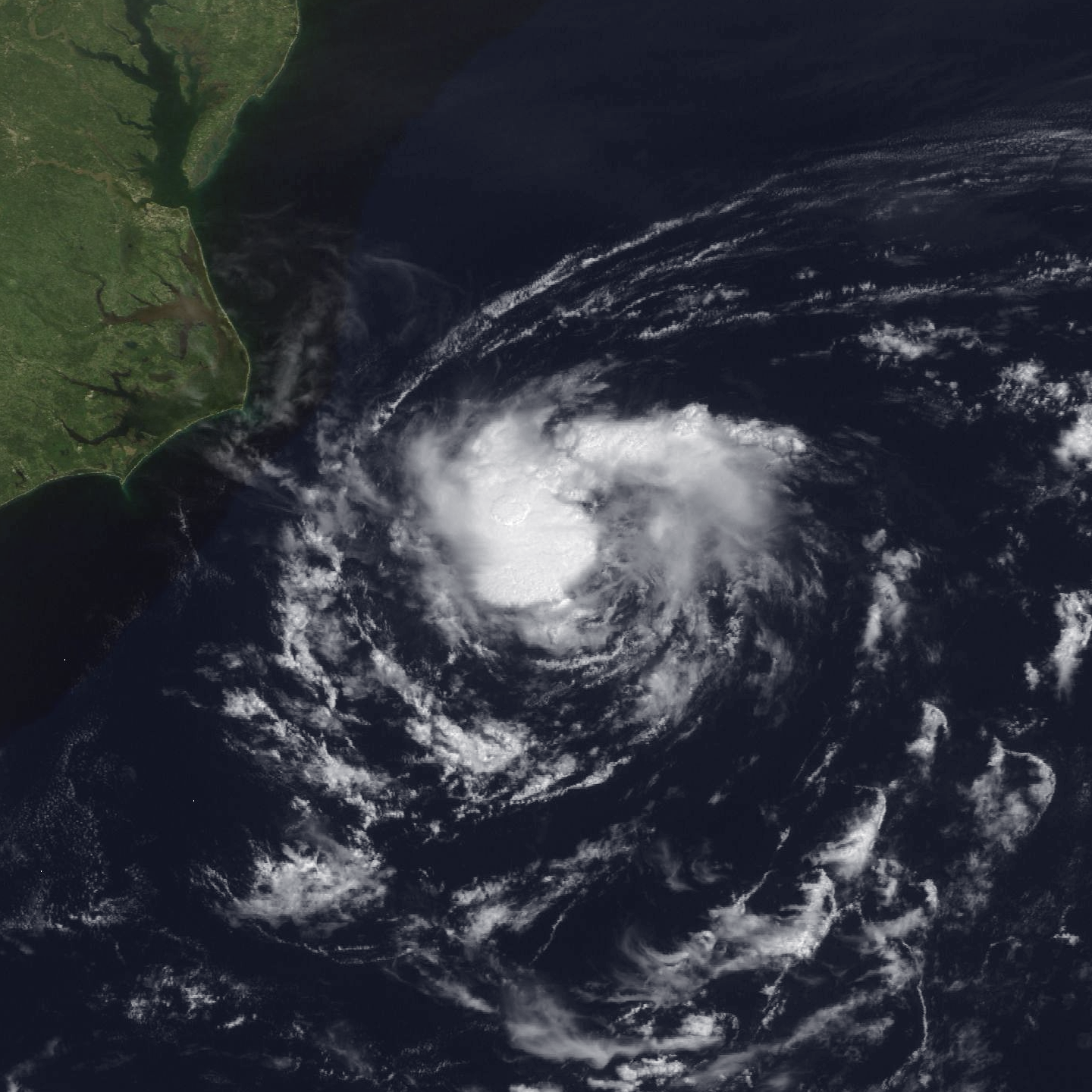
Satellite image of Tropical Storm Claudette near peak intensity on July 14

- 00:00 UTC (8:00 p.m. EDT, July 13) at 32.3°N 73.0°W – Tropical Storm Claudette reaches its peak intensity, with maximum sustained winds of 45 mph (75 km/h) and a minimum central pressure of 1003 mbar (29.62 inHg), about 245 mi (400 km) southeast of Cape Hatteras.

July 16

- 00:00 UTC (8:00 p.m. AST, July 15) at 36.7°N 64.9°W – Tropical Storm Claudette weakens into a tropical depression about 305 mi (490 km) north of Bermuda.
- 06:00 UTC (2:00 a.m. AST) at 36.6°N 62.7°W – Tropical Depression Claudette restrengthens into a tropical storm about 315 mi (510 km) north-northeast of Bermuda.
- 12:00 UTC (7:00 a.m. CDT) at 27.4°N 92.6°W – Tropical Depression Four (Note: Despite its name, Tropical Depression Four was the fifth tropical cyclone of the season, as the subtropical storm was not recognized until November.) forms from an area of low pressure about 145 mi (230 km) south of the southwestern Louisiana coast.
- 18:00 UTC (2:00 p.m. AST) at 35.9°N 57.9°W – Tropical Storm Claudette weakens below gale force and transitions into an extratropical cyclone about 460 mi (740 km) east-northeast of Bermuda; it is absorbed by a cold front shortly thereafter.

July 17

- 06:00 UTC (2:00 a.m. AST) at 12.0°N 51.5°W – Tropical Depression Five (Note: Despite its name, Tropical Depression Five was the sixth tropical cyclone of the season, as the subtropical storm was not recognized until November.) forms from a tropical wave about 545 mi (880 km) east of Barbados.
- 12:00 UTC (7:00 a.m. CDT) at 28.3°N 91.4°W – Tropical Depression Four strengthens into Tropical Storm Danny about 125 mi (205 km) southwest of the Mississippi River Delta.
- 12:00 UTC (8:00 a.m. AST) at 12.5°N 52.7°W – Tropical Depression Five reaches its peak intensity, with maximum sustained winds of 35 mph (55 km/h) and a minimum central pressure of 1008 mbar (29.77 inHg), about 465 mi (750 km) east of Barbados.

July 18

- 06:00 UTC (1:00 a.m. CDT) at 29.2°N 89.9°W – Tropical Storm Danny strengthens into a Category 1 hurricane about 30 mi (45 km) southwest of the Mississippi River Delta.
- 09:00 UTC (4:00 a.m. CDT) at 29.3°N 89.7°W – Hurricane Danny makes its first landfall near Empire, Louisiana, with sustained winds of 75 mph (120 km/h) and a central pressure of 989 mbar (29.21 inHg). It then emerges back over the Gulf of Mexico.

July 19

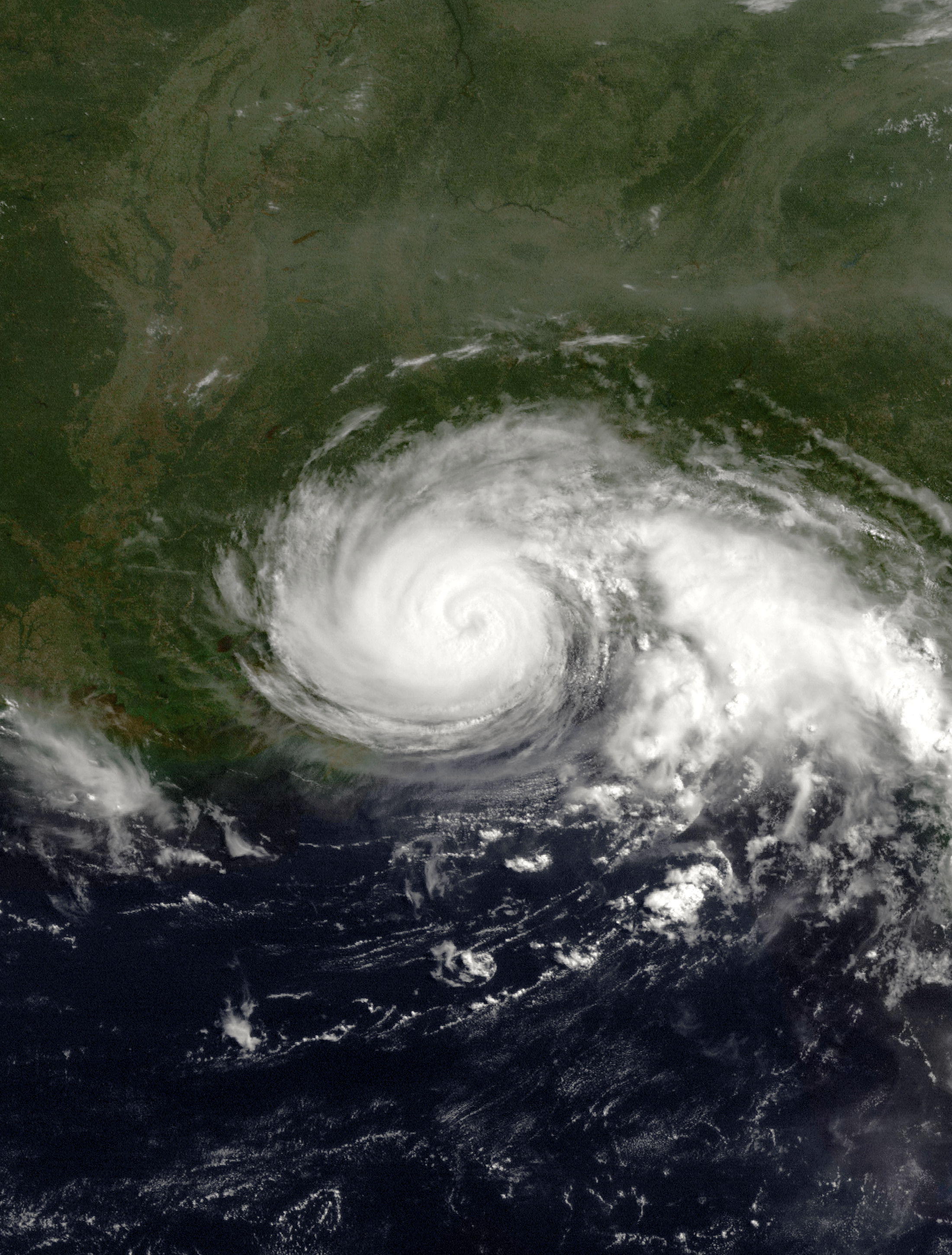
Satellite image of Hurricane Danny near peak intensity over Mobile Bay on July 19

- 00:00 UTC (7:00 p.m. CDT, July 18) at 29.8°N 88.4°W – Hurricane Danny reaches its peak intensity, with maximum sustained winds of 80 mph (130 km/h) and a minimum central pressure of 984 mbar (29.06 inHg), about 35 mi (55 km) southwest of Fort Morgan, Alabama.
- 00:00 UTC (8:00 p.m. AST, July 18) at 15.0°N 60.0°W – Tropical Depression Five is last noted as a tropical cyclone about 130 mi (215 km) north-northwest of Barbados; it dissipates shortly thereafter.
- 10:00 UTC (5:00 a.m. CDT) at 30.2°N 88.1°W – Hurricane Danny makes its second landfall near Fort Morgan at peak intensity, and subsequently emerges over Mobile Bay.
- 18:00 UTC (1:00 p.m. CDT) at 30.4°N 87.9°W – Hurricane Danny makes its third and final landfall near Mullet Point, Alabama, with sustained winds of 75 mph (120 km/h) and a central pressure of 986 mbar (29.12 inHg).

July 20

- 00:00 UTC (7:00 p.m. CDT, July 19) at 30.3°N 87.6°W – Hurricane Danny weakens into a tropical storm inland, about 15 mi (30 km) east-southeast of Mullet Point.
- 18:00 UTC (1:00 p.m. CDT) at 30.8°N 87.4°W – Tropical Storm Danny weakens into a tropical depression inland, about 40 mi (65 km) northeast of Mullet Point. It proceeds to move slowly and erratically northward for the next two days, after which it turns to the east while located over northeastern Alabama and Georgia.

July 24

- 18:00 UTC (2:00 p.m. EDT) at 36.4°N 76.7°W – Tropical Depression Danny restrengthens into a tropical storm inland, near the border between North Carolina and Virginia; it emerges over the Atlantic Ocean roughly one hour later.

July 25

- 18:00 UTC (2:00 p.m. AST) at 40.7°N 69.9°W – Tropical Storm Danny reaches its secondary peak intensity, with sustained winds of 60 mph (95 km/h) and a central pressure of 994 mbar (29.35 inHg), about 40 mi (65 km) south-southeast of Nantucket, Massachusetts.

July 26

- 06:00 UTC (2:00 a.m. AST) at 40.4°N 68.0°W – Tropical Storm Danny transitions into an extratropical cyclone about 125 mi (205 km) east-southeast of Nantucket, and subsequently dissipates.

=== August ===
- There were no tropical cyclones in August.

=== September ===
September 3

- 06:00 UTC (2:00 a.m. AST) at 10.9°N 44.1°W – A tropical depression forms from a tropical wave about 1,150 mi (1,850 km) east of the Lesser Antilles.
- 18:00 UTC (2:00 p.m. AST) at 12.3°N 47.1°W – The recently formed tropical depression strengthens into Tropical Storm Erika about 920 mi (1,480 km) east of the Lesser Antilles.

September 4

- 18:00 UTC (2:00 p.m. AST) at 15.2°N 53.7°W – Tropical Storm Erika strengthens into a Category 1 hurricane about 460 mi (740 km) east of the Lesser Antilles.

September 7

- 18:00 UTC (2:00 p.m. AST) at 20.6°N 63.2°W – Hurricane Erika strengthens to Category 2 intensity about 190 mi (305 km) northeast of Saint Thomas, U.S. Virgin Islands.

September 8

- 06:00 UTC (2:00 a.m. AST) at 21.8°N 63.2°W – Hurricane Erika strengthens to Category 3 intensity about 265 mi (425 km) north-northeast of Saint Thomas, making it the only major hurricane of the season.

September 9

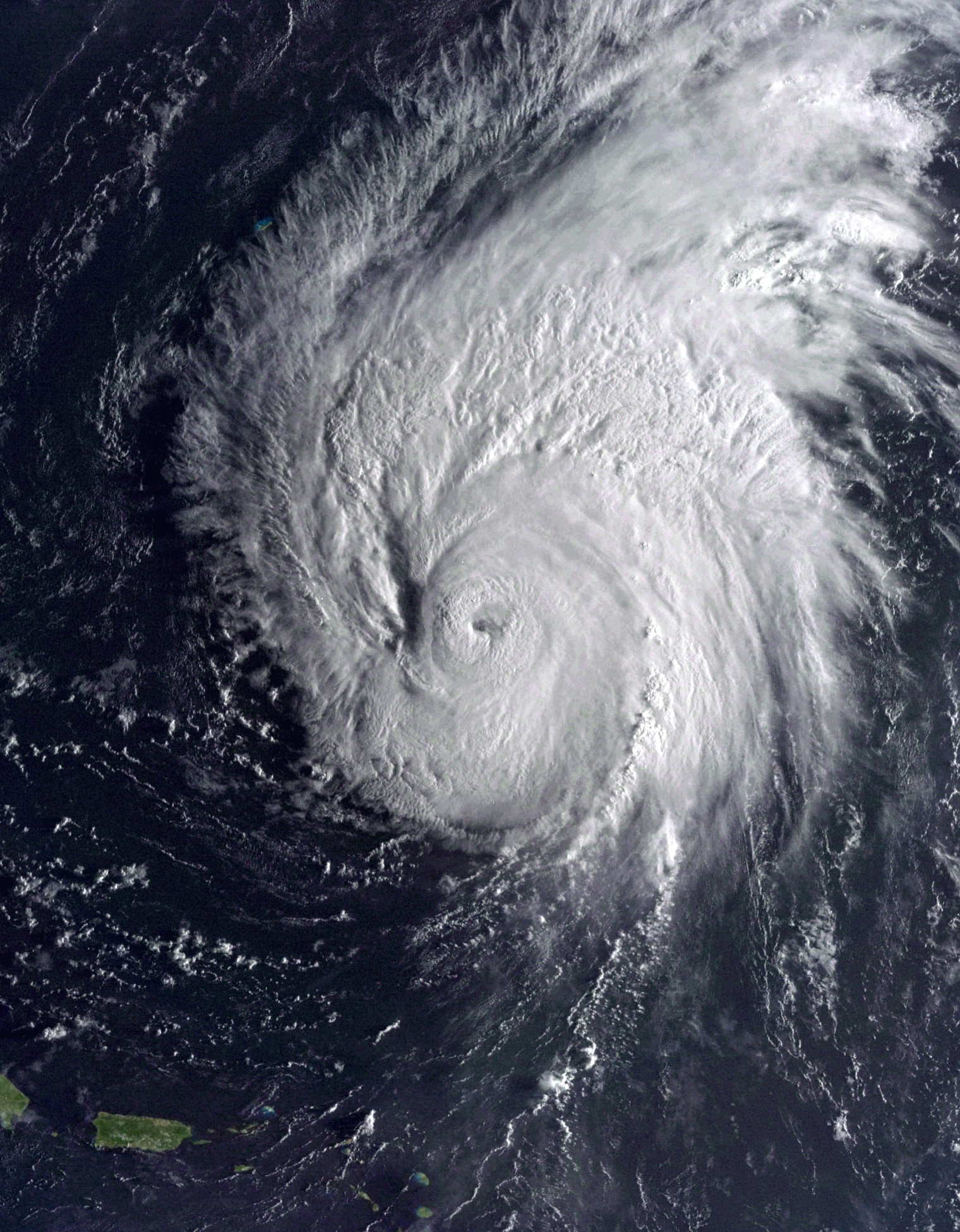
Satellite image of Hurricane Erika near peak intensity on September 9

- 06:00 UTC (2:00 a.m. AST) at 25.2°N 61.4°W – Hurricane Erika reaches its peak intensity, with maximum sustained winds of 125 mph (205 km/h) and a minimum central pressure of 946 mbar (27.94 inHg), about 525 mi (845 km) north-northeast of Saint Thomas.

September 10

- 12:00 UTC (8:00 a.m. AST) at 32.2°N 58.3°W – Hurricane Erika weakens to Category 2 intensity about 375 mi (600 km) east of Bermuda.

September 11

- 00:00 UTC (8:00 p.m. AST, September 10) at 34.8°N 56.4°W – Hurricane Erika weakens to Category 1 intensity about 510 mi (825 km) east-northeast of Bermuda.

September 12

- 00:00 UTC (8:00 p.m. AST, September 11) at 37.6°N 49.9°W – Hurricane Erika weakens into a tropical storm about 915 mi (1,470 km) east-northeast of Bermuda.

September 16

- 00:00 UTC (8:00 p.m. AST, September 15) at 42.2°N 28.2°W – Tropical Storm Erika transitions into an extratropical cyclone about 240 mi (390 km) north-northwest of Lajes Air Base in the Azores, and subsequently dissipates about 230 mi (370 km) southwest of Ireland.

=== October ===
October 4

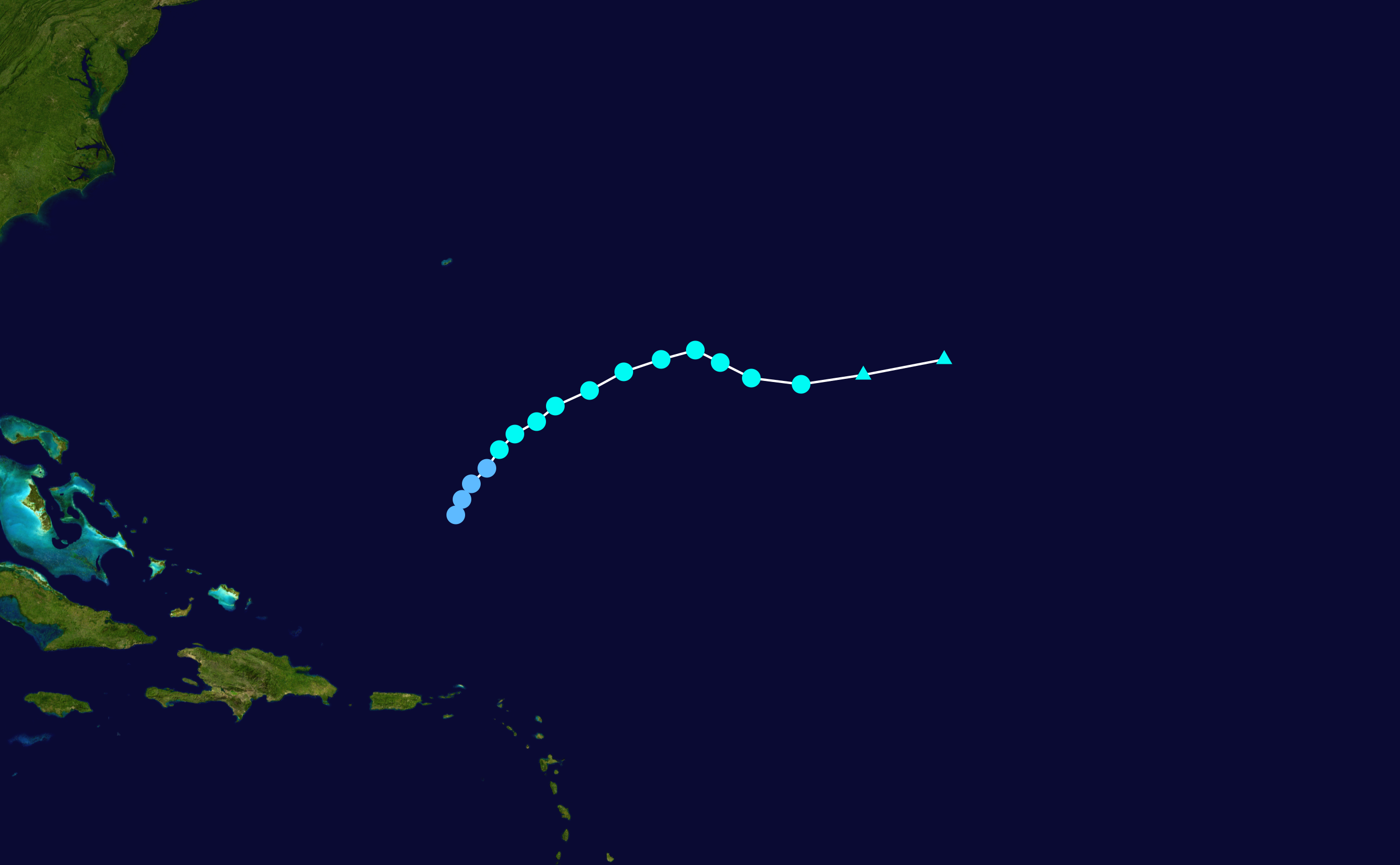
Track map of Tropical Storm Fabian

- 18:00 UTC (2:00 p.m. AST) at 24.2°N 64.5°W – A tropical depression forms from an area of low pressure about 415 mi (665 km) north of the Virgin Islands.

October 5

- 18:00 UTC (2:00 p.m. AST) at 26.3°N 63.1°W – The recently formed tropical depression strengthens into Tropical Storm Fabian about 570 mi (915 km) north of the Virgin Islands.

October 7

- 12:00 UTC (8:00 a.m. AST) at 29.5°N 56.8°W – Tropical Storm Fabian reaches its peak intensity, with maximum sustained winds of 40 mph (65 km/h) and a minimum central pressure of 1004 mbar (29.65 inHg), about 925 mi (1,490 km) northeast of the Virgin Islands.

October 8

- 12:00 UTC (8:00 a.m. AST) at 28.7°N 51.4°W – Tropical Storm Fabian transitions into an extratropical cyclone about 1,115 mi (1,795 km) northeast of the Virgin Islands, and subsequently dissipates.

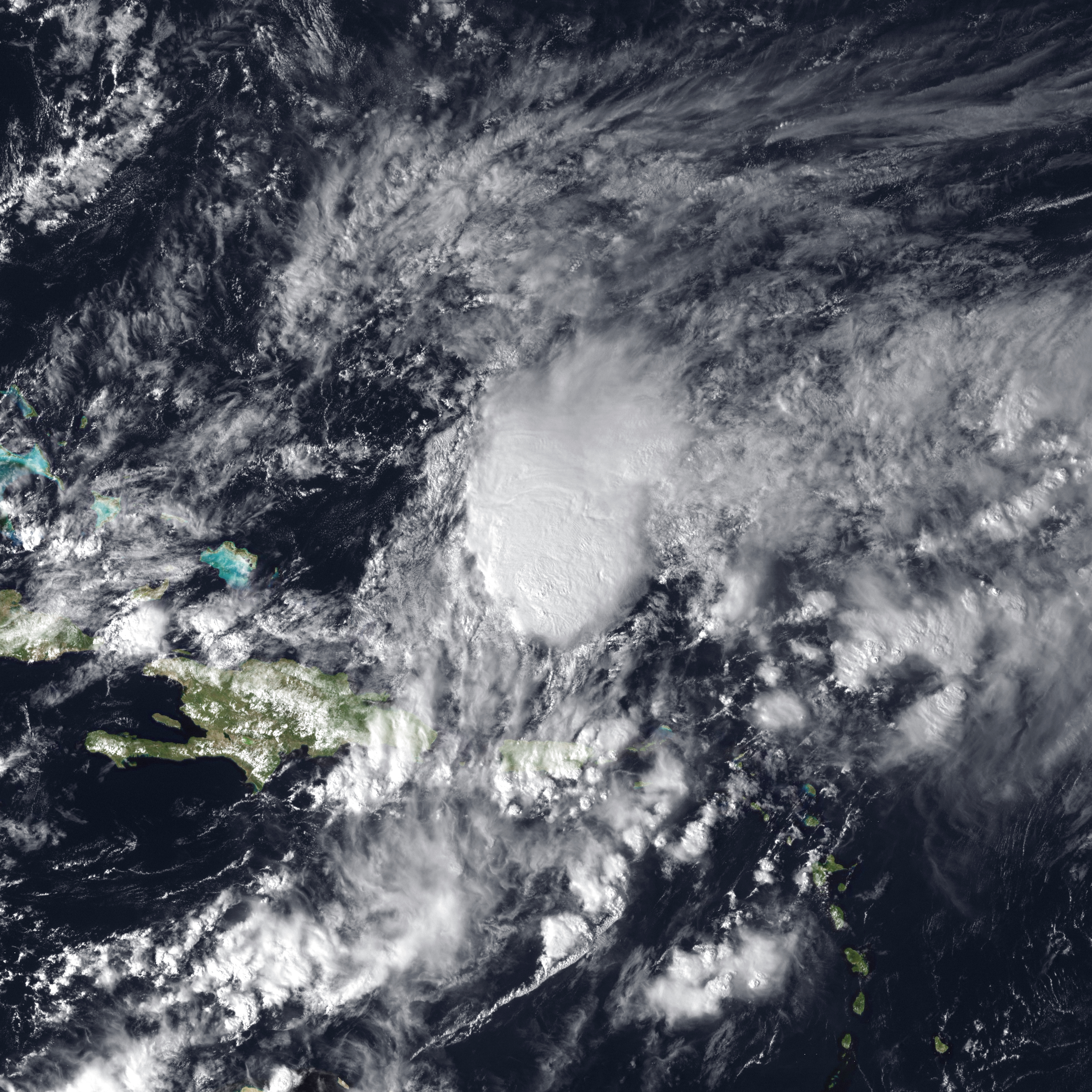
Satellite image of the precursor to Tropical Storm Grace on October 15

October 16

- 00:00 UTC (8:00 p.m. AST, October 15) at 21.2°N 64.4°W – Tropical Storm Grace forms from an extratropical cyclone about 205 mi (335 km) north of the Virgin Islands. It is already at its peak intensity, with maximum sustained winds of 45 mph (75 km/h) and a minimum central pressure of 999 mbar (29.50 inHg).

October 17

- 12:00 UTC (8:00 a.m. AST) at 24.5°N 47.3°W – Tropical Storm Grace weakens below gale force, transitions back into an extratropical cyclone about 1,205 mi (1,935 km) east-northeast of the Virgin Islands, and subsequently dissipates. (Note: While the NHC's Preliminary Report on Tropical Storm Grace considers the system to have been extratropical at 12:00 UTC on October 17, HURDAT lists Grace as a tropical depression at that time.)

=== November ===
- There were no tropical cyclones in November.

November 30

- The 1997 Atlantic hurricane season officially ends.

== See also ==
- Timeline of the 1997 Pacific hurricane season
- Atlantic hurricane season
- Tropical cyclones in 1997
