= 1997 hurricane season =

1997 hurricane season may refer to:

- The 1997 Atlantic hurricane season
- The 1997 Pacific hurricane season
