= 1997 Atlantic hurricane season =

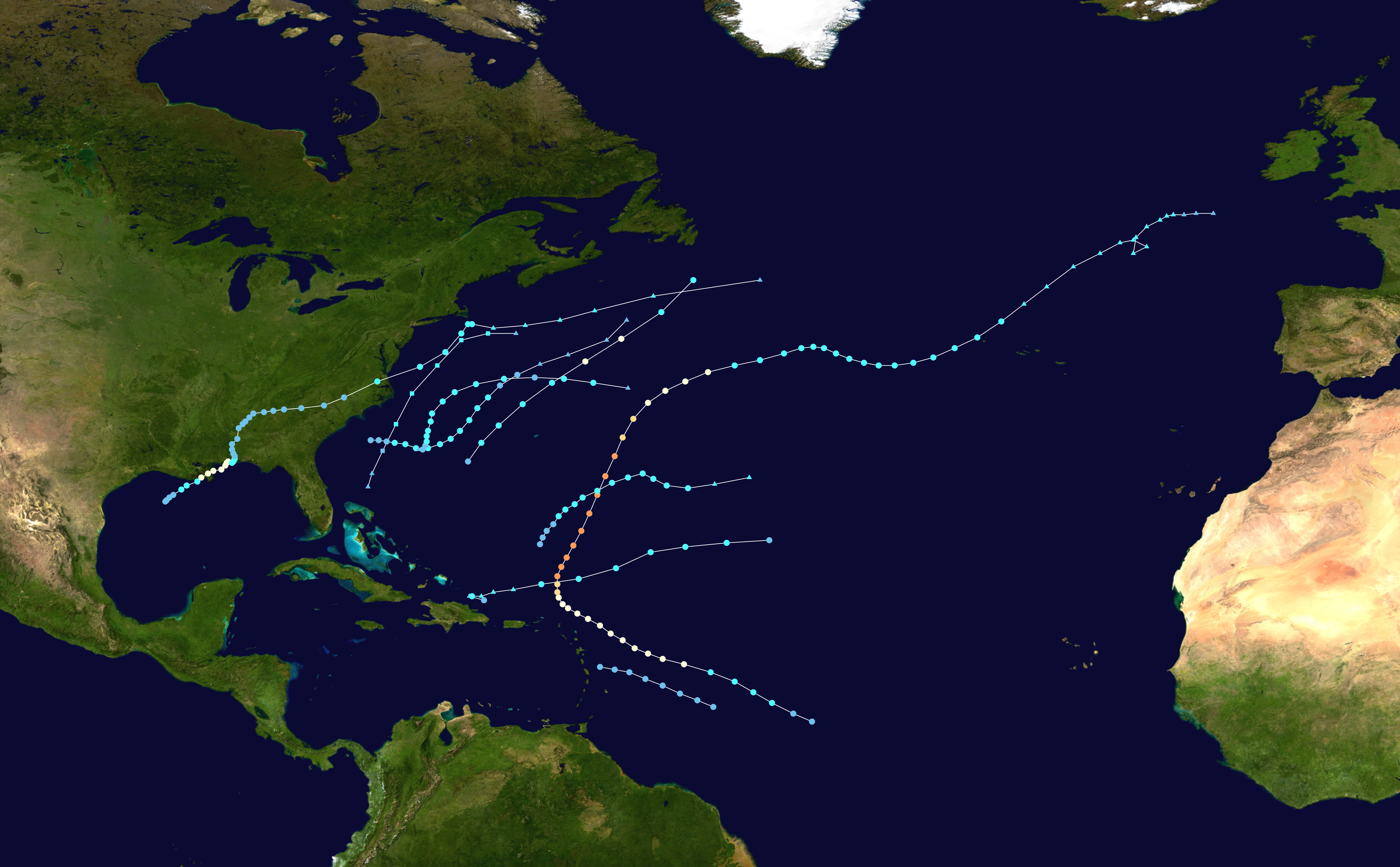
- Season summary map

Seasonal boundaries
- First system formed: June 1, 1997
- Last system dissipated: October 17, 1997

Strongest storm
- Name: Erika
  - Maximum winds: 125 mph (205 km/h) (1-minute sustained)
  - Lowest pressure: 946 mbar (hPa; 27.94 inHg)

Seasonal statistics
- Total depressions: 9
- Total storms: 8
- Hurricanes: 3
- Major hurricanes (Cat. 3+): 1
- ACE: 41
- Total fatalities: 12 total
- Total damage: $111.46 million (1997 USD)

Related articles
- Timeline of the 1997 Atlantic hurricane season; 1997 Pacific hurricane season; 1997 Pacific typhoon season; 1997 North Indian Ocean cyclone season

The 1997 Atlantic hurricane season was a below-average hurricane season. It officially began on June 1, and lasted until November 30 of that year. These dates conventionally delimit the period of each year when most tropical cyclones form in the Atlantic basin. The 1997 season was fairly inactive, with only seven named storms forming, with an additional tropical depression and an unnumbered subtropical storm. It was the first time since the 1961 season that there were no active tropical cyclones in the Atlantic basin during the entire month of August—historically one of the more active months of the season—a phenomenon that would not occur again until 2022. A strong El Niño is credited with reducing activity in the Atlantic, while increasing the number of storms in the eastern and western Pacific basins to 19 and 26 storms, respectively. As is common in El Niño years, tropical cyclogenesis was suppressed in the tropical latitudes, with only two becoming tropical storms south of 25°N.

The first system, an operationally unnoticed subtropical storm, developed north of the Bahamas on June 1 and dissipated by the following day without any impact. Tropical Storm Ana developed offshore South Carolina on June 30 and dissipated on July 4, after causing minor affects in North Carolina. Hurricane Bill was a short-lived storm that lasted from July 11 to July 13 and produced light rainfall in Newfoundland. As Bill was dissipating, Tropical Storm Claudette developed and generated rough seas in North Carolina. The most devastating storm was Hurricane Danny, which caused extensive flooding, particularly in southern Alabama. Danny resulted in 9 fatalities and about $100 million (1997 USD) in damage. The outer bands of Hurricane Erika brought rough seas and gusty winds to the Lesser Antilles, resulting in two deaths and $10 million in losses. The precursor to Tropical Storm Grace caused flooding in Puerto Rico, while Tropical Depression Five and Tropical Storm Fabian did not impact any land. Collectively, the storms of the 1997 Atlantic hurricane season resulted in 12 fatalities and approximately $111.46 million in damages.

== Seasonal forecasts ==
Predictions of tropical activity in the 1997 season
Source	Date	Named storms	Hurricanes	Major hurricanes	Ref
Average (1981–2010)		12.1	6.4	2.7
Record high activity		30	15	7†
Record low activity		1	0†	0†
CSU	December 6, 1996	11	7	3
WRC	Early 1997	7	4	N/A
CSU	April 4, 1997	11	7	3
CSU	May 30, 1997	11	7	3
CSU	August 6, 1997	11	6	2
	Actual activity	8	3	1
† Most recent of several such occurrences. (See all)

Forecasts of hurricane activity are issued before each hurricane season by noted hurricane experts such as Dr. William M. Gray and his associates at Colorado State University (CSU), as well as the Weather Prediction Center (WPC). As stated by the National Oceanic and Atmospheric Administration (NOAA), an Atlantic hurricane season between 1981–2010 contained roughly twelve tropical storms, six hurricanes, three major hurricanes, and an accumulated cyclone energy (ACE) index of 66–103 units. NOAA typically categorizes a season as either above-average, average, of below-average based on the cumulative ACE Index; however, the number of tropical storms, hurricanes, and major hurricanes within a hurricane season is considered occasionally as well.

CSU's first outlook for the season, issued in December 1996, predicted eleven named storms, seven hurricanes, and three major hurricanes, which are defined as a tropical cyclone reaching at least a Category 3 rating on the Saffir–Simpson Hurricane Scale. These numbers went unchanged during their forecast updates released in April and May. CSU issued these predictions based on the possibility of El Niño weakening, a cessation of drought conditions over the Sahel, and nearly identical trade wind and atmospheric pressure patterns compared to the previous season. In August, however, CSU slightly decreased their predicted number of hurricanes and major hurricanes to six and two, respectively, after the El Niño strengthened instead. In early 1997, the WRC anticipated a less active season, forecasting seven named storms and four hurricanes, but issuing no prediction on the number of major hurricanes.

== Seasonal summary ==
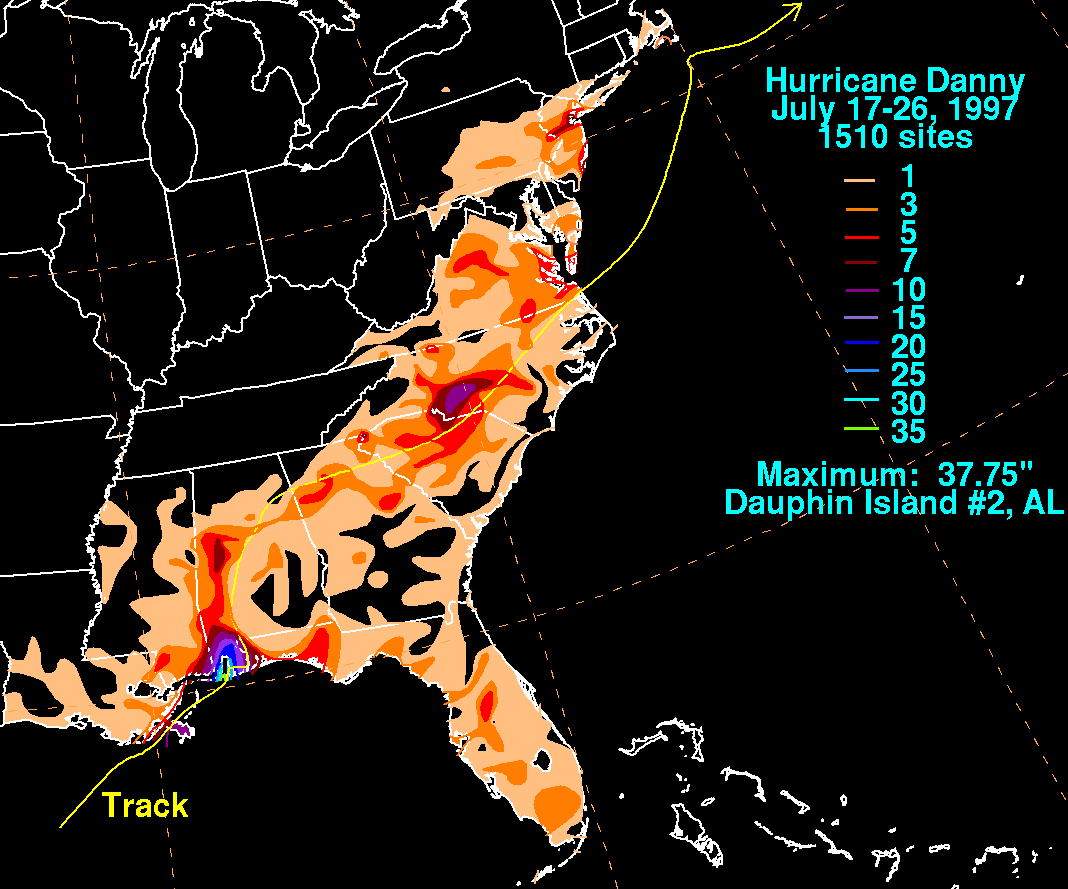
Map of rainfall totals from Hurricane Danny in the United States

The Atlantic hurricane season officially began on June 1, and an unnamed subtropical storm developed on the same day. Only nine tropical depressions formed. Eight of the depressions attained tropical storm status, making 1997 the least active Atlantic hurricane season in the ongoing above-average era of tropical cyclogenesis, which began in 1995. Just three of these systems attained hurricane status and only one tropical cyclone intensified into a major hurricane, which was below the 1981–2010 average of three per season. Only Danny made landfall at hurricane strength during the season, although Hurricane Erika and Tropical Storm Grace also caused damage and fatalities. Those three cyclones collectively caused 12 deaths and $111.46 million in damage. The last storm of the season, Tropical Storm Grace, dissipated on October 17, over a month before the official end of the season on November 30.

The 1997 Atlantic hurricane season had a very active beginning. In June, two tropical cyclones developed – the unnoticed subtropical storm and Tropical Storm Ana. An unusual four tropical cyclones formed in the month of July, three of which reached tropical storm intensity, and two of them became hurricanes. Despite the active start, the other months of the season featured record low activity, especially in August and September, both of which combined produced only one tropical cyclone. As a result of the active start and subsequent lack of activity, it showed that early season activity has no correlation to the entire season. Further, this marked the first occurrence of no tropical cyclogenesis in August since 1961, and the most recent instance of no activity in that month until 2022. The lone tropical cyclone during the period was Hurricane Erika, which developed on September 3. In October, two short-lived tropical cyclones developed, Fabian and Grace. Tropical cyclogenesis ceased after Grace transitioned into an extratropical cyclone on October 17.

The season's activity was reflected with a low accumulated cyclone energy (ACE) rating of 41. ACE is, broadly speaking, a measure of the power of the hurricane multiplied by the length of time it existed, so storms that last a long time, as well as particularly strong hurricanes, have high ACEs. It is only calculated for full advisories on tropical systems at or exceeding 39 mph (63 km/h), which is the threshold for tropical storm strength.

== Systems ==
=== Unnumbered subtropical storm ===
- Subtropical storm (SSHWS)
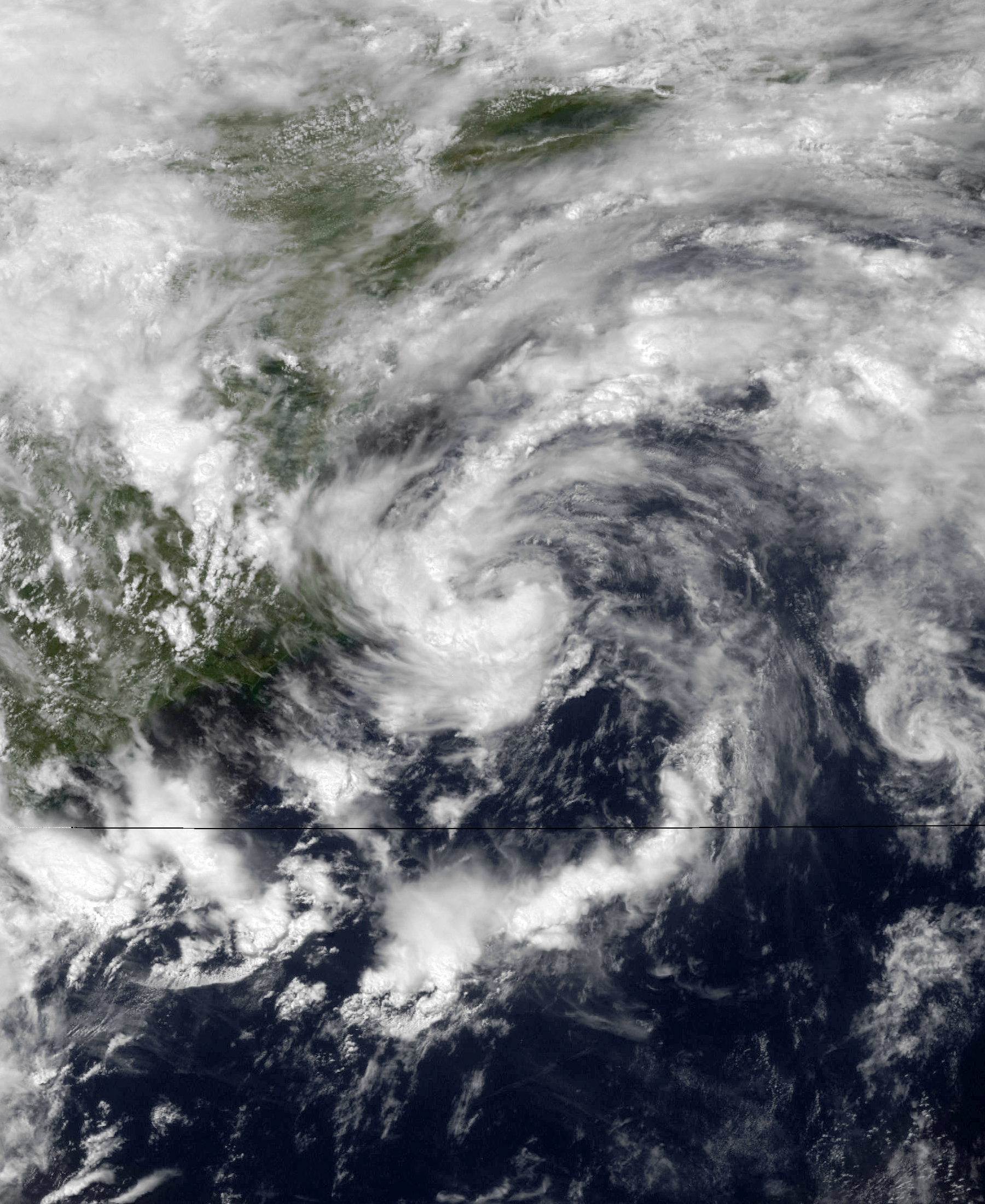
- Duration: June 1 – June 2
- Peak intensity: 50 mph (85 km/h) (1-min); 1003 mbar (hPa)

A cluster of thunderstorms developed over Florida in late May. A shortwave trough brought it to the northeast, enhancing convection around a developing center of circulation. The low pressure area, which formed on May 31, developed into a subtropical depression on June 1. Operationally, it was treated as a frontal low, but post-analysis suggested it remained separate throughout its lifetime, and was classified as an unnamed subtropical storm. It reached subtropical storm strength six hours later as it moved rapidly parallel to the East Coast of the United States. The convection continued to wrap around the center, and despite unfavorable conditions from an approaching cold front it continued to intensify. Late on June 1, it reached its peak intensity with maximum sustained winds of 50 mph (85 km/h) while off the coast of North Carolina. The storm turned to the east, and transitioned extratropical late on June 2 southeast of Massachusetts. Shortly thereafter, the remnants of the storm merged with a cold front.

=== Tropical Storm Ana ===
- Tropical storm (SSHWS)
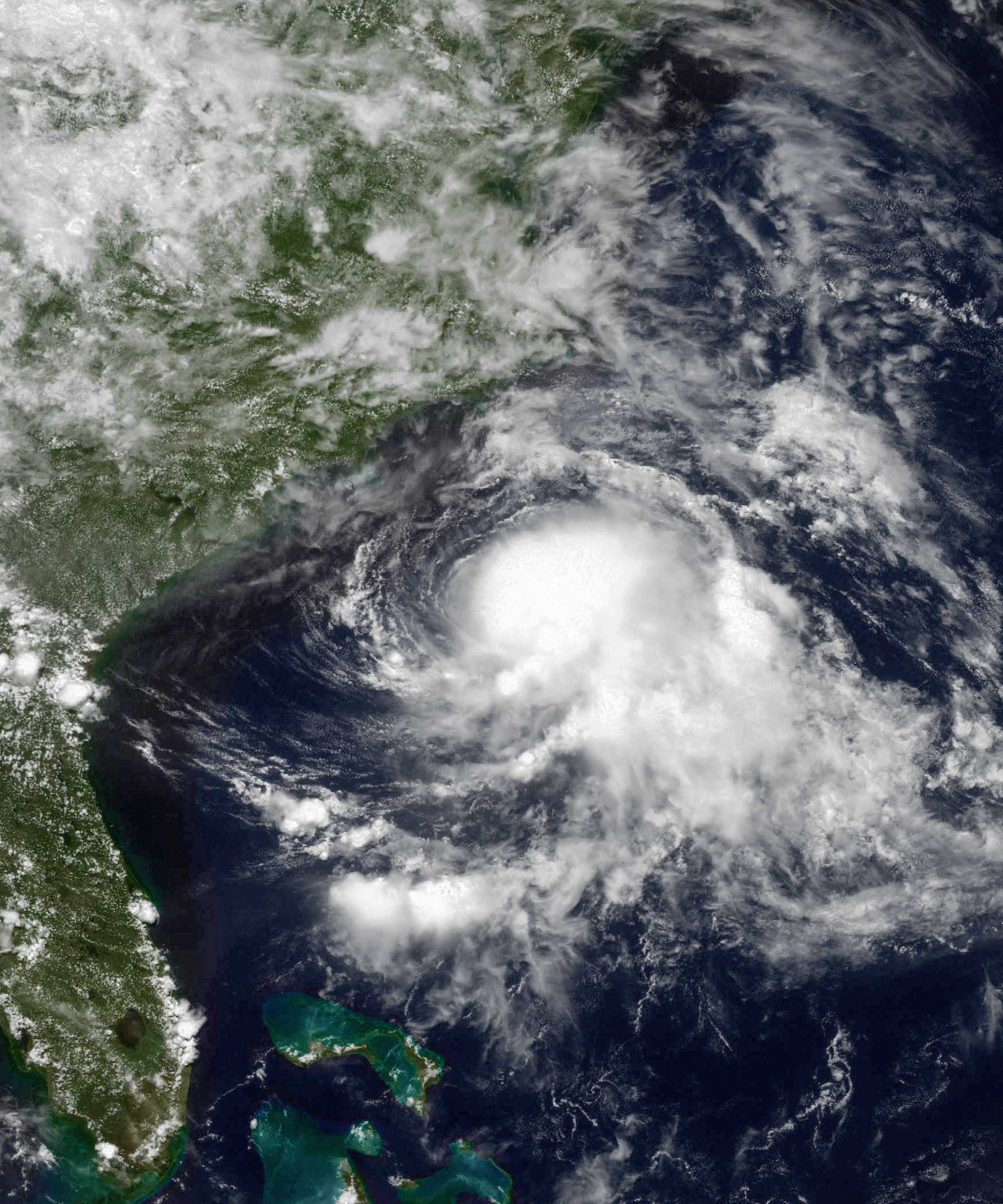
- Duration: June 30 – July 4
- Peak intensity: 45 mph (75 km/h) (1-min); 1000 mbar (hPa)

A frontal low pressure system off the coast of South Carolina developed into Tropical Depression One at 1200 UTC on June 30. It moved slowly eastward, and attained tropical storm status on July 1. After becoming a tropical storm, Ana slightly intensified. Early on July 2, Ana attained its peak intensity with maximum sustained winds of 45 mph (75 km/h) and a minimum central pressure of 1,000 mbar (30 inHg). Later on July 2, a shortwave trough forced Ana to northeastward, into a region of increasing vertical wind shear. Simultaneously, Ana began to weaken, as it was moving into an area of decreasing sea surface temperatures.

By late on July 3, Ana weakened to a tropical depression. The storm also lost tropical characteristics and transitioned into an extratropical cyclone early on July 4, over the western Atlantic Ocean. The extratropical remnants persisted until dissipating about twenty-four hours later. Minimal impact was reported as a result of Ana, other than rip currents in coastal North Carolina. Due to the rough seas, 14 rescues and one serious injury occurred at Carolina Beach. In addition, five rescues were made at Kure Beach and at least one person was hospitalized. However, there were no fatalities at either location.

=== Hurricane Bill ===
- Category 1 hurricane (SSHWS)
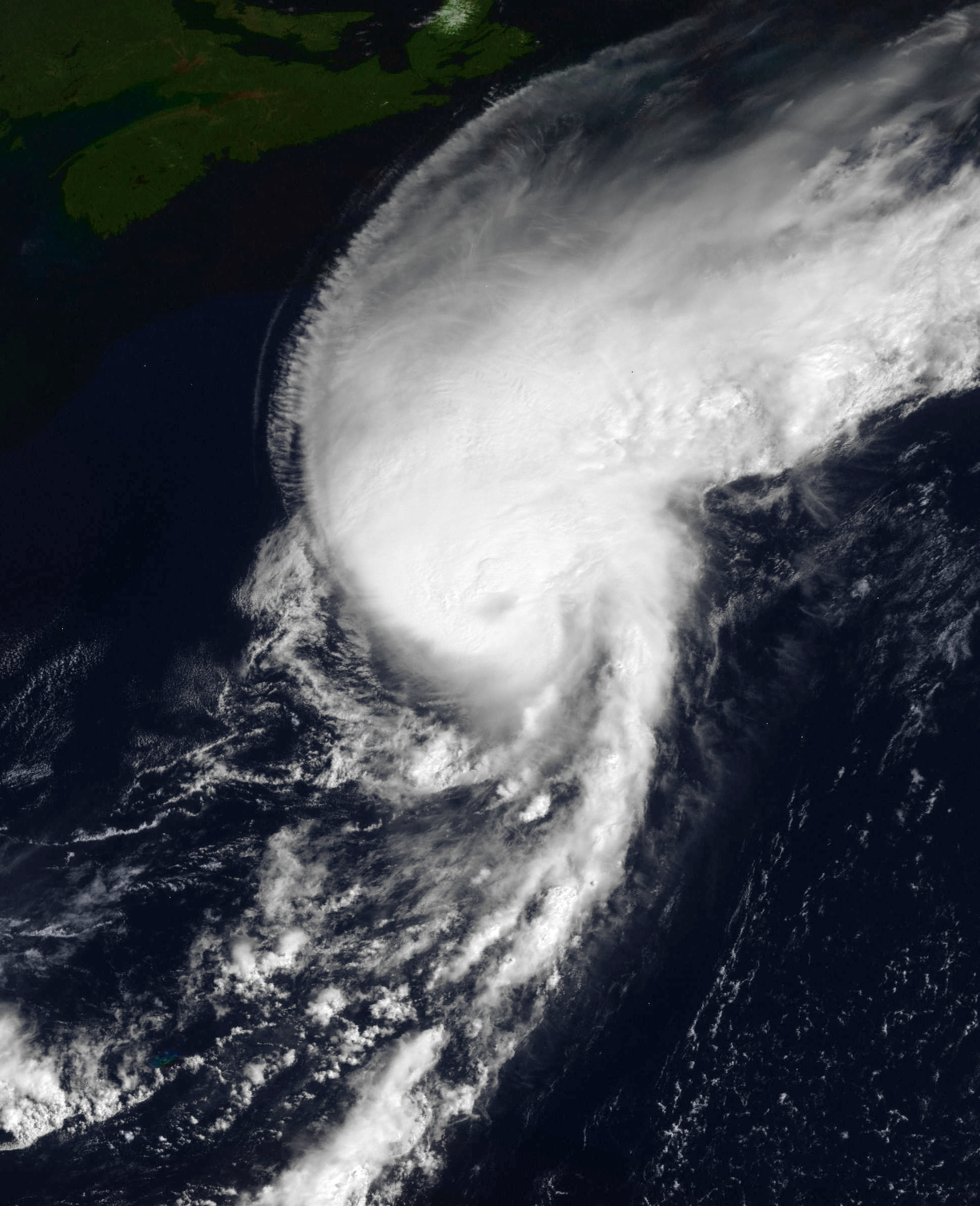
- Duration: July 11 – July 13
- Peak intensity: 75 mph (120 km/h) (1-min); 986 mbar (hPa)

A large upper-level low separated from a trough north of Puerto Rico in early July. Convection increased on July 7 after a surface trough developed, and a low pressure area formed east of the Bahamas once the upper-level low retreated to the southwest. Wind shear decreased across the region, allowing the convection to increase and organize, and it is estimated the system developed into a tropical depression on July 11 about 330 mi (530 km) southwest of Bermuda. After developing, the cyclone moved northeastward in advance of an approaching cold front. It quickly intensified into Tropical Storm Bill, and briefly threatened to pass near Bermuda. As a result, a tropical storm warning was issued, although it was quickly dropped; there was no impact on the island from Bill.

Bill quickly intensified as it continued northeastward. By midday on July 12, an eye feature was observed on satellite images, which suggested that Bill intensified into hurricane status at a relatively high latitude. Bill had in fact intensified into a hurricane, and the storm had attained its peak intensity with maximum sustained winds of 75 mph (120 km/h) and a minimum pressure of 986 mbar (29.1 inHg). After only 12 hours at hurricane status, Bill weakened back to tropical storm status, and on July 13 was absorbed by the cold front about 185 mi (300 km) south of Cape Race, Newfoundland. Bill dropped very light rainfall on Newfoundland, peaking at slightly less than 1 in (25 mm).

=== Tropical Storm Claudette ===
- Tropical storm (SSHWS)
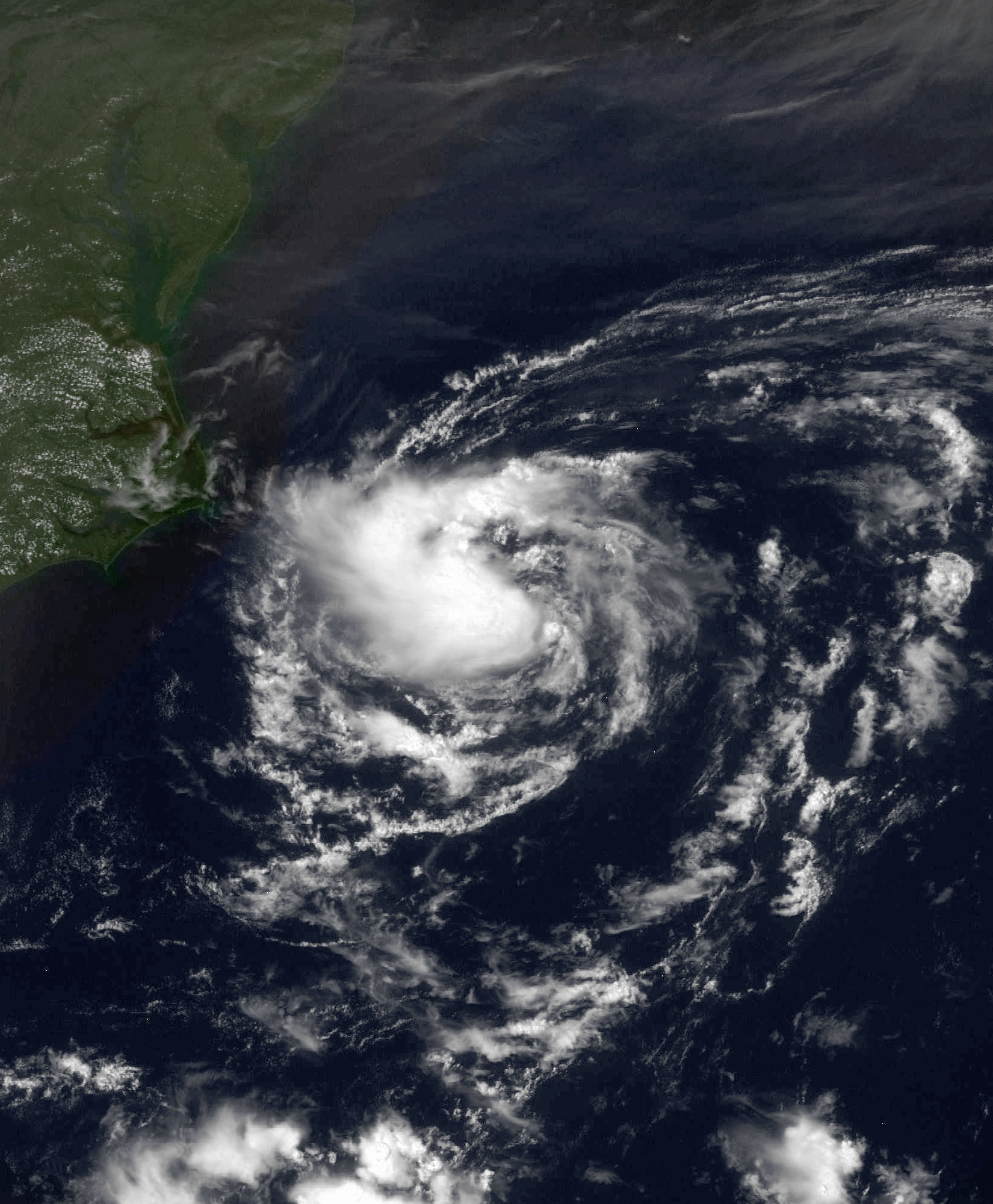
- Duration: July 13 – July 17
- Peak intensity: 45 mph (75 km/h) (1-min); 1003 mbar (hPa)

The frontal system that influenced the track of Hurricane Bill spawned a non-tropical low off the southeast United States on July 11. The low remained nearly stationary as the front dissipated, and it developed into Tropical Depression Three on July 13 about 325 mi (525 km) south-southeast of Wilmington, North Carolina. The depression quickly intensified into Tropical Storm Claudette, based on reconnaissance aircraft data. It moved northeastward, passing southeast of the Outer Banks. Despite the presence of wind shear it developed banding features. On July 14, the storm reached peak winds of 45 mph (75 km/h). Thereafter, Claudette turned eastward ahead of a frontal system.

Its associated thunderstorm activity was sporadic and relatively disorganized, and the storm weakened to a tropical depression on July 16. Claudette briefly re-intensified into a tropical storm before becoming extratropical later that day. Shortly thereafter, it merged with a cold front, while the remnants were last noted near the Azores on July 23. Tropical Storm Claudette had minimal effects on land. Severe rip currents from Claudette in North Carolina caused several rescues and one person was injured, although no fatalities occurred. Some residents of coastal North Carolina were even disappointed that Claudette was to remain offshore, as the region was suffering from dry conditions.

=== Hurricane Danny ===
- Category 1 hurricane (SSHWS)
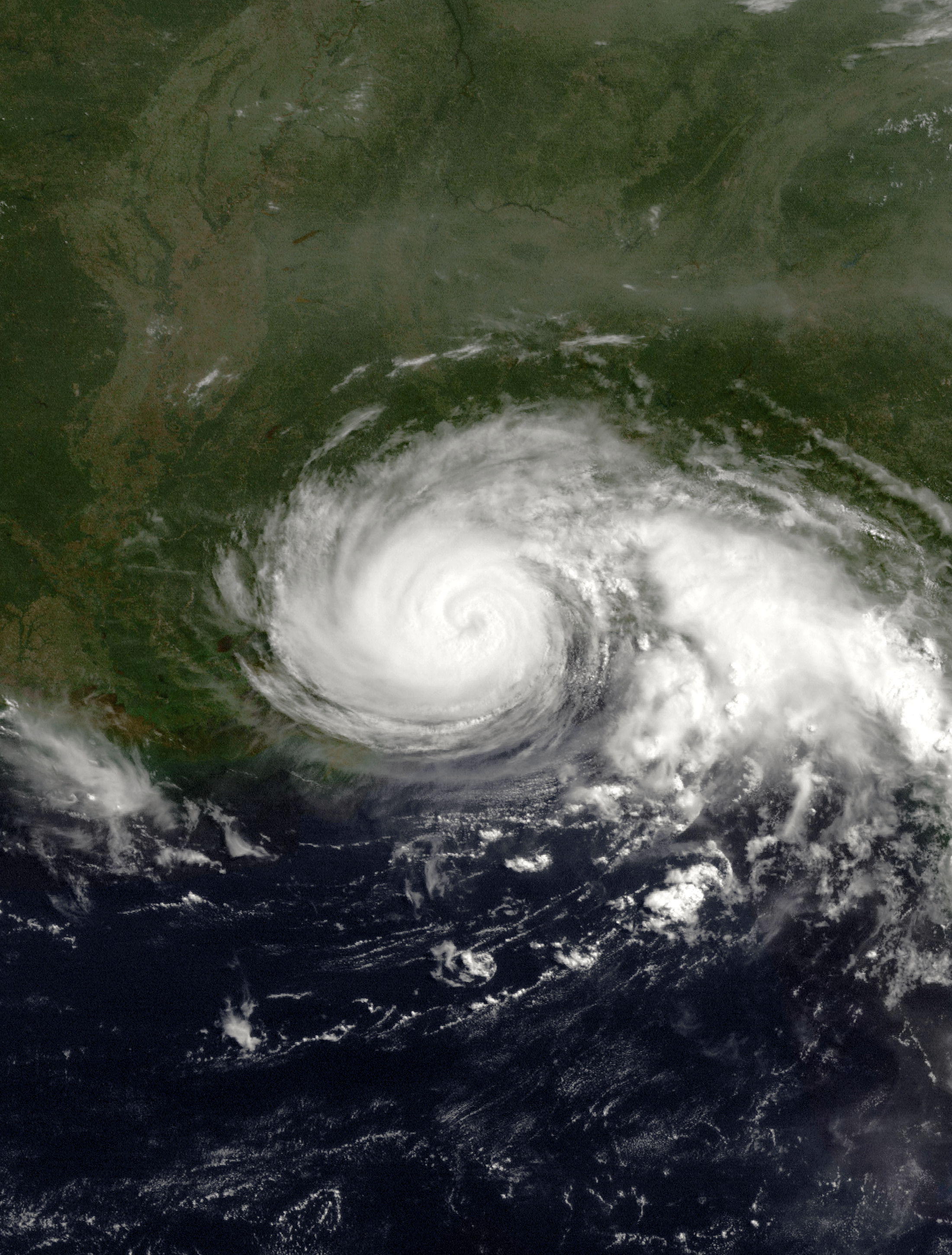
- Duration: July 16 – July 26
- Peak intensity: 80 mph (130 km/h) (1-min); 984 mbar (hPa)

A tropical low over the northern Gulf of Mexico developed into Tropical Depression Four on July 16. The depression headed slowly east-northeastward, and intensified into Tropical Storm Danny on the following day. Danny continued east-northeastward, and reached hurricane strength just before landfall near Buras, Louisiana. Because of the narrowness of that piece of land, most of Danny remained over water and it lost little strength. Danny re-emerged into the Gulf of Mexico, and strengthened slightly making two landfalls in Alabama as a low-end Category 1 hurricane on July 19. After remaining stationary for a day, Danny moved northward and weakened to a tropical depression. Heading northward across Alabama, Danny turned to the east and crossed over the Southeastern United States. While centered over North Carolina, Danny interacted with a developing trough, which caused it to re-intensify into a tropical storm. Shortly thereafter, Danny emerged over the Atlantic Ocean near the North Carolina–Virginia border on July 24. Danny took a northward turn, and came within 30 mi (50 km) of Nantucket Island on July 26. It then turned out to sea and was absorbed by a front on July 27.

Although Danny was a hurricane upon landfall, strong winds were confined to a small area, with only portions of extreme eastern Louisiana reporting hurricane-force winds. Danny also dropped torrential amounts of rain in Louisiana, peaking at 11.40 in (290 mm) in Buras-Triumph. Flooding occurred in portions of the state due to heavy rainfall. The floods and high winds produced by Danny damaged over 300 houses and more than 170 businesses in Louisiana alone. In Mississippi, Danny dropped heavy rainfall on the southern portion of the state, resulting in minor street and house flooding. As Danny crossed Dauphin Island, Alabama on July 19, it dropped 37.75 in (960 mm) of rain. This made Danny the wettest tropical cyclone on record in Alabama. Hurricane force-winds were reported on Dauphin Island and the western shores of Mobile Bay. In the same area, many buildings had sustained roof damage. In addition, many homes on the Fowl and Fish Rivers reported significant damage. Further north in South Carolina and Virginia, Danny spawned several tornadoes; some of them caused significant damage. Heavy rainfall also occurred in some isolated areas; in central North Carolina between 8–12 in (200–300 mm) of rain was reported. Danny eventually affected Massachusetts, bring light rainfall and tropical storm-force winds to the southeastern portions of the state. Overall, Danny caused nine fatalities, and approximately $100 million in damage.

=== Tropical Depression Five ===
- Tropical depression (SSHWS)
- Duration: July 17 – July 19
- Peak intensity: 35 mph (55 km/h) (1-min); 1008 mbar (hPa)

A tropical wave emerged into the Atlantic Ocean from the west coast of Africa on July 11. The wave moved westward across the tropical Atlantic, and finally began to show consistent evidence of a cloud system center. Deep convection associated with the wave became concentrated on satellite images on July 17, and it is estimated that the disturbance became Tropical Depression Five around 0600 UTC on that day while centered about 547 mi (880 km) east of Barbados. The tropical depression moved west-northwestward and started showing signs of falling apart on July 18. Early on the following day, the depression degenerated into a tropical wave. Recon observations before the storm fell apart suggested that it may have briefly reached tropical storm strength. The tropical wave continued westward without regenerating and lost its identity on July 23 over the eastern Gulf of Mexico.

=== Hurricane Erika ===
- Category 3 hurricane (SSHWS)
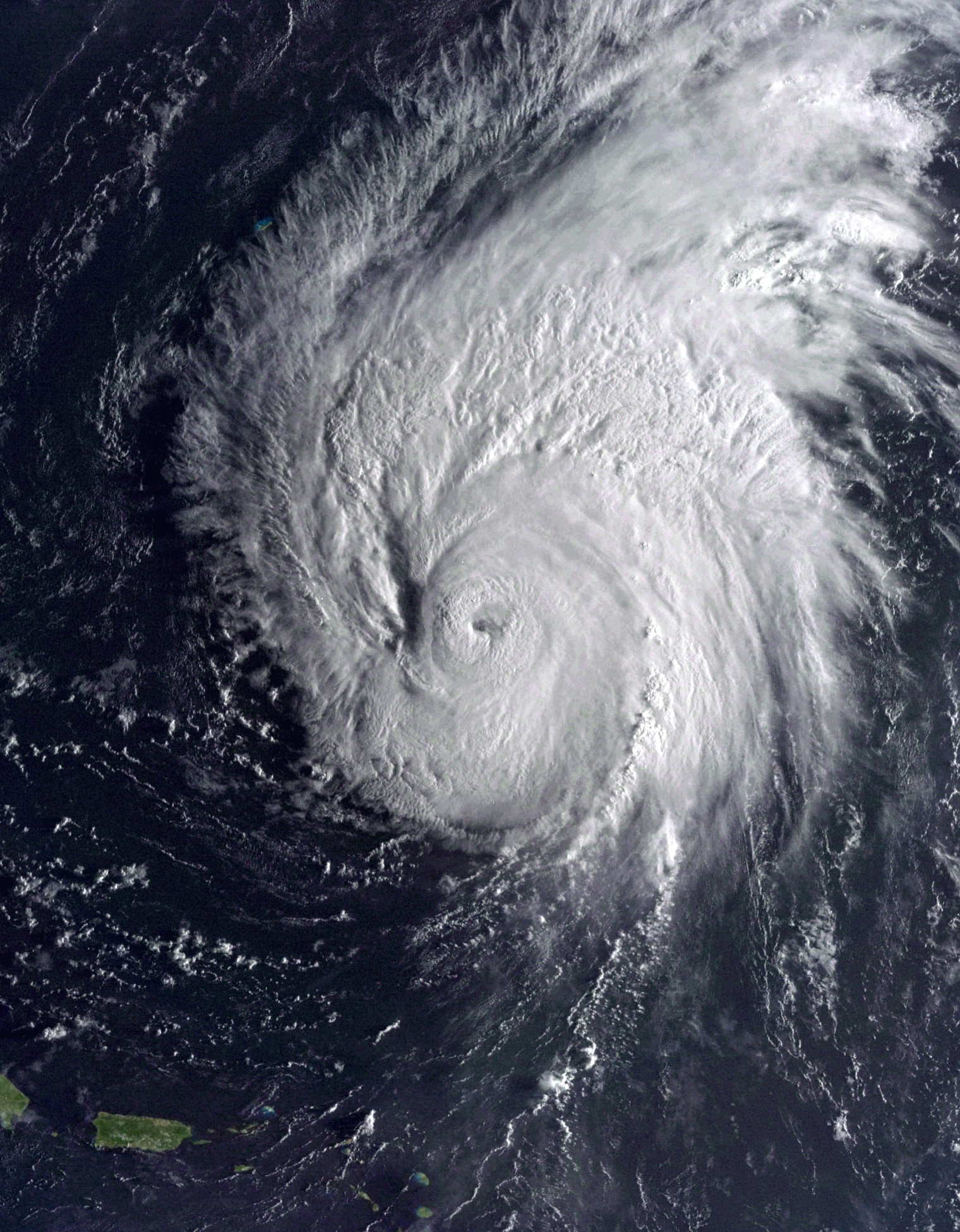
- Duration: September 3 – September 15
- Peak intensity: 125 mph (205 km/h) (1-min); 946 mbar (hPa)

A large tropical wave exited western Africa on August 31, accompanied by a large circulation. Moving westward across the Atlantic Ocean, the system developed into Tropical Depression Six early on September 3, after the circulation became sufficiently organized. At that time, it was located about 1,150 miles (1,850 km) east of the southernmost Lesser Antilles. The depression developed rainbands as it organized, strengthening into Tropical Storm Erika 12 hours after forming. A ridge steered the storm to the west-northwest, and the National Hurricane Center (NHC) initially forecast a track toward the Lesser Antilles. Erika developed an eye feature on September 4, and later that day it attained hurricane status. Despite unfavorable conditions, Erika continued to strengthen. It passed about 85 mi (140 km) northeast of the Lesser Antilles on September 6. An approaching trough weakened the ridge to Erika's north, causing the hurricane to slow and turn northward on September 8. Around that time, it attained maximum sustained winds of 125 mph (200 km/h), making Erika a Category 3 hurricane on the Saffir-Simpson scale. Its minimum pressure fell to 946 mbar (27.9 inHg). Erika maintained peak intensity for about 24 hours before weakening over cooler waters. It passed about 350 mi (560 km) east of Bermuda on September 10. Two days later, Erika fell to tropical storm status. Its path shifted to the east-southeast, before turning back to the northeast and restrengthening. Erika attained a secondary peak intensity of 70 mph (110 km/h) on September 15, before weakening again. Later that day, the storm passed through the western Azores, and subsequently lost all of its thunderstorms. Erika transitioned into an extratropical cyclone on September 16. The storm executed a small loop before dissipating on September 19, southwest of Ireland.

The threat of Hurricane Erika led to tropical storm and hurricane watches warnings in the Lesser Antilles. This included a hurricane warning for Antigua, Montserrat, Barbuda, Saint Kitts and Nevis, Anguilla, Dominica, and Saint Barthélemy. A hurricane watch extended westward to Puerto Rico. Authorities on Saint Martin enacted a curfew for all but those in service jobs. Passing northeast of the Lesser Antilles, Erika produced strong waves that killed two surfers in Puerto Rico. The waves caused beach erosion and coastal flooding, closing parts of a road, and forcing eight families to evacuate. On Puerto Rico strong winds snapped trees and power lines, leaving at least 10,000 people without power. High waves sank a dingy on Water Island, and led to a rescue of a boat. Just weeks after the eruption of the Soufrière Hills Volcano on Montserrat, Erika's winds blew ash clouds over Antigua. In the United States Virgin Islands, strong winds knocked down power lines. The outer rainbands dropped precipitation across the islands, peaking at 3.28 inches (83 mm) in St. Thomas, causing minor street flooding. Damage in Puerto Rico and the U.S. Virgin Islands totaled $10 million (1997 USD). While passing near the Azores, Erika produced a wind gust of 105 mph (169 km/h) on a 200 ft (61 m) tower. The hurricane produced rough seas throughout the archipelago. Erika was the only Atlantic tropical cyclone during August or September this year, the first such occurrence during this period since 1929.

=== Tropical Storm Fabian ===
- Tropical storm (SSHWS)
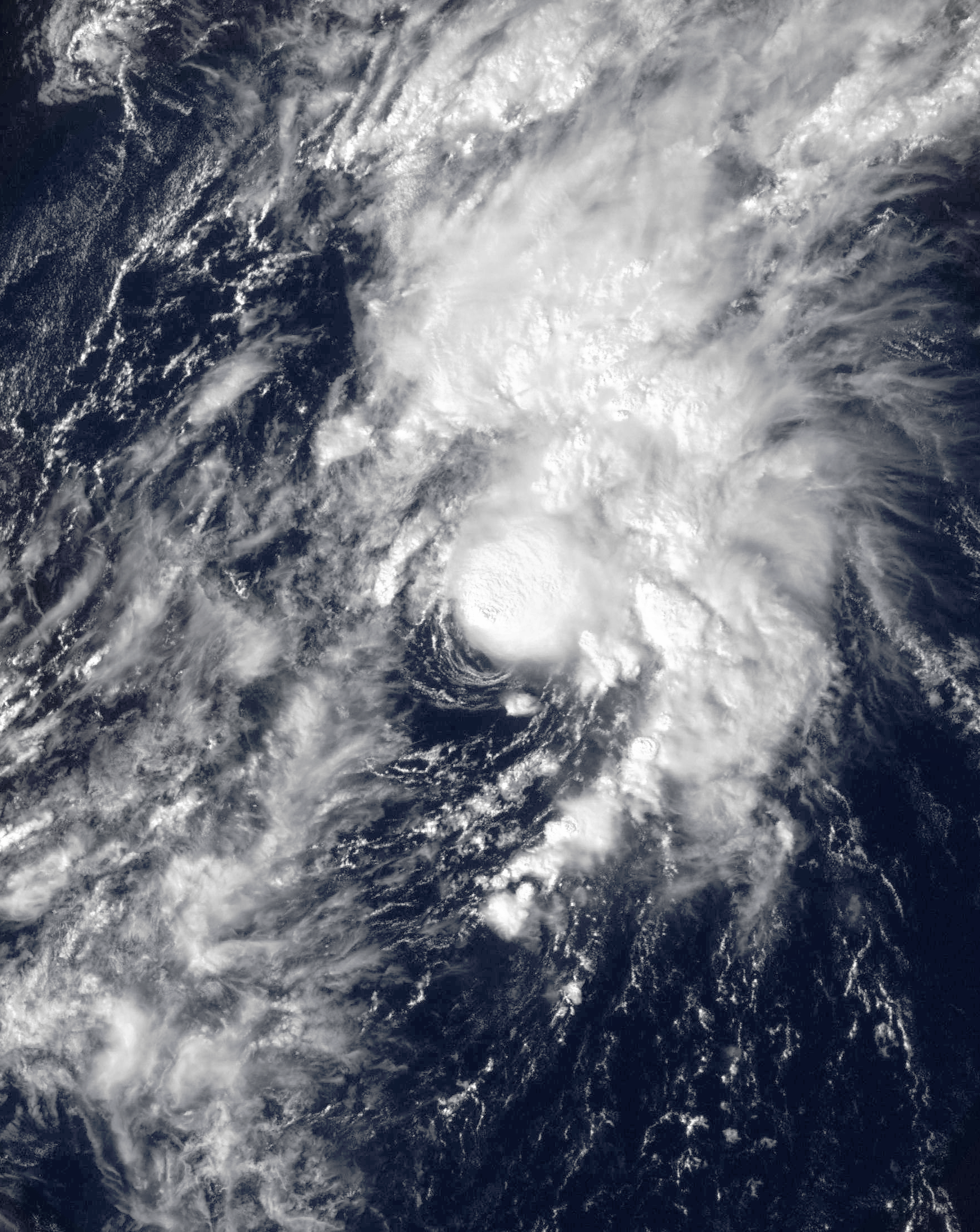
- Duration: October 4 – October 8
- Peak intensity: 40 mph (65 km/h) (1-min); 1004 mbar (hPa)

A tropical wave emerged into the Atlantic Ocean from the west coast of Africa near Dakar, Senegal on September 22. The wave traveled westward with minimal tropical cyclogenesis and reached the Lesser Antilles about a week later. While passing through the islands, heavy rainfall and strong winds were reported. Eventually, the system developed into a broad area of low pressure and acquired a low-level circulation. However, upper-level wind shear resulted in no immediate further organization. After crossing Puerto Rico and the Virgin Islands, wind shear decreased, since the low was moving in the same direction as the upper-level winds.

At 1800 UTC October 4, it is estimated that system developed into Tropical Depression Seven, while 410 mi (660 km) north of Puerto Rico. However, the NHC did not initiate advisories until 1500 UTC on October 7. The depression strengthened and about 24 hours after forming, it became Tropical Storm Fabian later on October 5. No further significant change in intensity occurred for the remainder of its duration, as Fabian had peaked with winds of 40 mph (65 km/h). The storm began losing tropical characteristics and transitioned into an extratropical cyclone at 1200 UTC on October 8.

=== Tropical Storm Grace ===
- Tropical storm (SSHWS)
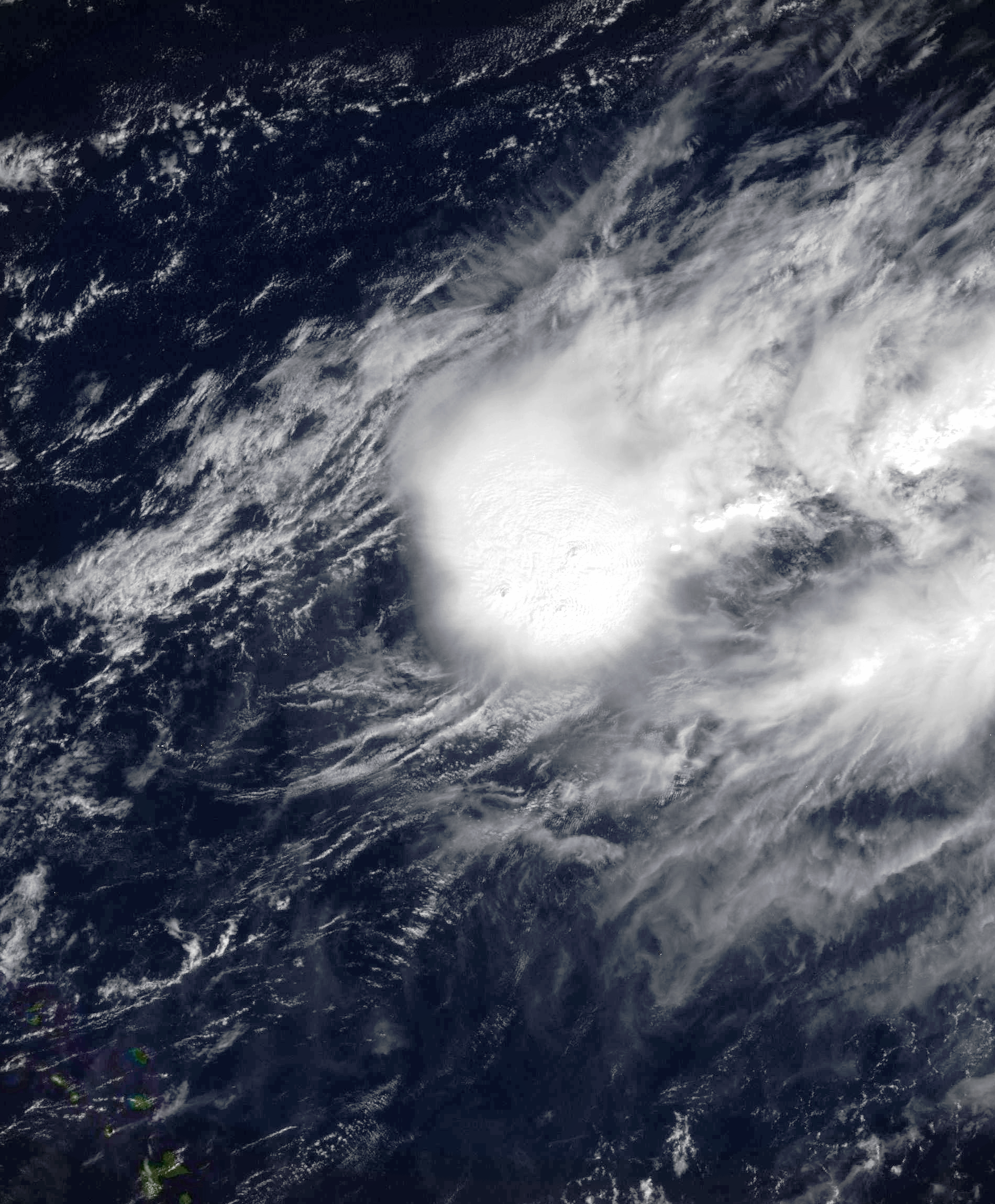
- Duration: October 16 – October 17
- Peak intensity: 45 mph (75 km/h) (1-min); 999 mbar (hPa)

An extratropical low formed just north of Hispaniola on October 14, and on the following day, it attained gale-force winds. In addition, the system was also acquiring tropical characteristics, and was classified as Tropical Storm Grace on October 16 at 0000 UTC. Strong vertical wind shear prevented further intensification, and Grace immediately peaked with maximum sustained winds of 45 mph (75 km/h) and a minimum barometric pressure of 999 mbar (29.5 inHg). Though Grace was classified as a tropical cyclone, it still held onto some extratropical characteristics. Thereafter, Grace steadily weakened and eventually degenerated into an extratropical low on October 17.

The precursor disturbance of Grace dropped moderate to heavy rainfall across Puerto Rico, peaking at 12.69 in (320 mm) in Aibonito. As a result, flash flooding occurred throughout the island of Puerto Rico, while landslides caused damage to roads and bridges. In addition, numerous rivers overflowed their banks, which forced 37 people to seek shelter across the island. One fatality occurred, and damage amounted to $1.46 million. In addition, the extratropical system produced light to moderate rainfall in the U.S. Virgin Islands, and precipitation reached 7 in (180 mm) along western sides of the islands.

== Storm names ==
The following list of names was used for named storms that formed in the north Atlantic in 1997. This is the same list used for the 1991 season, except for Bill, which replaced Bob. A storm was named Bill for the first time in 1997. There were no names retired from this list after the season, so it was used again for the 2003 season.

- Ana
- Bill
- Claudette
- Danny
- Erika
- Fabian
- Grace
- Henri (unused)
- Isabel (unused)
- Juan (unused)
- Kate (unused)
- Larry (unused)
- Mindy (unused)
- Nicholas (unused)
- Odette (unused)
- Peter (unused)
- Rose (unused)
- Sam (unused)
- Teresa (unused)
- Victor (unused)
- Wanda (unused)

== Season effects ==
This is a table of all of the storms that formed in the 1997 Atlantic hurricane season. It includes their name, duration, peak classification and intensities, areas affected, damage, and death totals. Deaths in parentheses are additional and indirect (an example of an indirect death would be a traffic accident), but were still related to that storm. Damage and deaths include totals while the storm was extratropical, a wave, or a low, and all of the damage figures are in 1997 USD.

Saffir–Simpson scale
TD	TS	C1	C2	C3	C4	C5

1997 North Atlantic tropical cyclone season statistics
Storm name	Dates active	Storm category at peak intensity	Max 1-min wind mph (km/h)	Min. press. (mbar)	Areas affected	Damage (US$)	Deaths	Ref(s).
Unnumbered	June 1 – 2	Subtropical storm	50 (85)	1003	None	None	None	
Ana	June 30 – July 4	Tropical storm	45 (75)	1000	East Coast of the United States	Minimal	None	
Bill	July 11 – 13	Category 1 hurricane	75 (120)	986	Newfoundland	None	None	
Claudette	July 13 – 16	Tropical storm	45 (75)	1003	East Coast of the United States	None	None	
Danny	July 16 – 26	Category 1 hurricane	80 (130)	984	Gulf Coast of the United States, Southeastern United States, Mid-Atlantic states, New England	$100 million	4 (5)	
Five	July 17 – 19	Tropical depression	35 (55)	1008	None	None	None	
Erika	September 3 – 20	Category 3 hurricane	125 (205)	946	Lesser Antilles, Azores	$10 million	2	
Fabian	October 4 – 8	Tropical storm	40 (65)	994	Lesser Antilles	None	None	
Grace	October 16 – 17	Tropical storm	45 (75)	999	United States Virgin Islands, Puerto Rico and Hispaniola	$1.46 million	1	
Season aggregates
9 systems	June 1 – October 17		125 (205)	946		$111.46 million	7 (5)	

== See also ==
- Tropical cyclones in 1997
- 1997 Pacific hurricane season
- 1997 Pacific typhoon season
- 1997 North Indian Ocean cyclone season
- South-West Indian Ocean cyclone seasons: 1996–97, 1997–98
- Australian region cyclone seasons: 1996–97, 1997–98
- South Pacific cyclone seasons: 1996–97, 1997–98
- South Atlantic tropical cyclone
- Mediterranean tropical-like cyclone
