= Social Behavior and Personality =

- Discipline: Social psychology, developmental psychology, personality psychology
- Language: English
- Edited by: Robert A. C. Stewart

Publication details
- History: 1973–present
- Publisher: Scientific Journal Publishers
- Frequency: Monthly
- Impact factor: 1.3 (2022)

Standard abbreviations
- ISO 4: Soc. Behav. Pers.

Indexing
- ISSN: 0301-2212 (print); 1179-6391 (web)
- LCCN: 73645808
- OCLC no.: 1788339

Links
- Journal homepage; Online access; Online archive

Social Behavior and Personality is a monthly peer-reviewed academic journal covering social, developmental, and personality psychology with a strong focus on how these topics link with the areas of health, education and organizations. It was established in 1973 and is published by Scientific Journal Publishers. The founding and current editor-in-chief is Robert A. C. Stewart (Society for Personality Research). Authors have to cover part of the publications costs of their articles.

== History ==
The number of issues published per year has grown progressively from two (1973–1990) to four (1991–1988), eight (2001–2005), ten (2006–2017), and finally in 2018 to twelve issues. In January 2018, the journal announced that from 2019 it would move from print and electronic publication to electronic only.

== Abstracting and indexing ==
The journal is abstracted and indexed in:

- Current Contents/Social and Behavioral Sciences
- EBSCO databases
- Index Islamicus
- International Bibliography of Periodical Literature
- ProQuest databases
- PsycINFO
- Scopus
- Social Sciences Citation Index

According to the Journal Citation Reports, the journal has a 2022 impact factor of 1.3.
