= Tropical cyclones in 1998 =

Year boundaries
- First system: Ron and Katrina
- Formed: January 1, 1998
- Last system: TL
- Dissipated: January 2, 1999

Strongest system
- Name: Zeb, Ron and Susan
- Lowest pressure: 900 mbar (hPa); 26.58 inHg

Longest lasting system
- Name: Katrina (Fourth longest-lasting tropical system on record)
- Duration: 24 days

Year statistics
- Total systems: 124
- Named systems: 73
- Total fatalities: > 23,365
- Total damage: $29.802 billion (1998 USD)
Related articles
- 1998 Atlantic hurricane season
- 1998 Pacific hurricane season
- 1998 Pacific typhoon season
- 1998 North Indian Ocean cyclone season
- 1997–98 South-West Indian Ocean cyclone season
- 1998–99 South-West Indian Ocean cyclone season
- 1997–98 Australian region cyclone season
- 1998–99 Australian region cyclone season
- 1997–98 South Pacific cyclone season
- 1998–99 South Pacific cyclone season

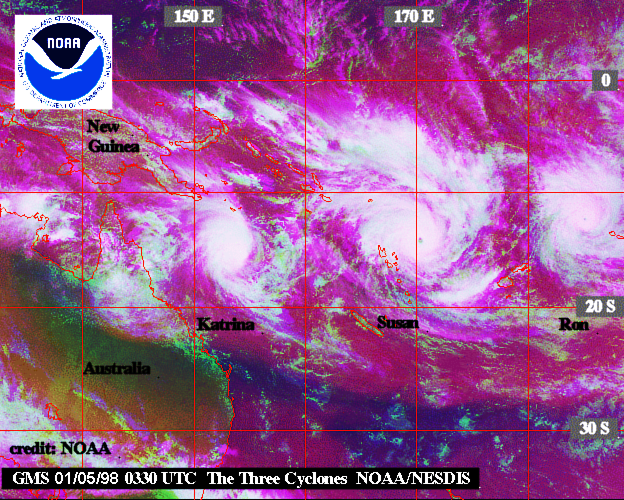
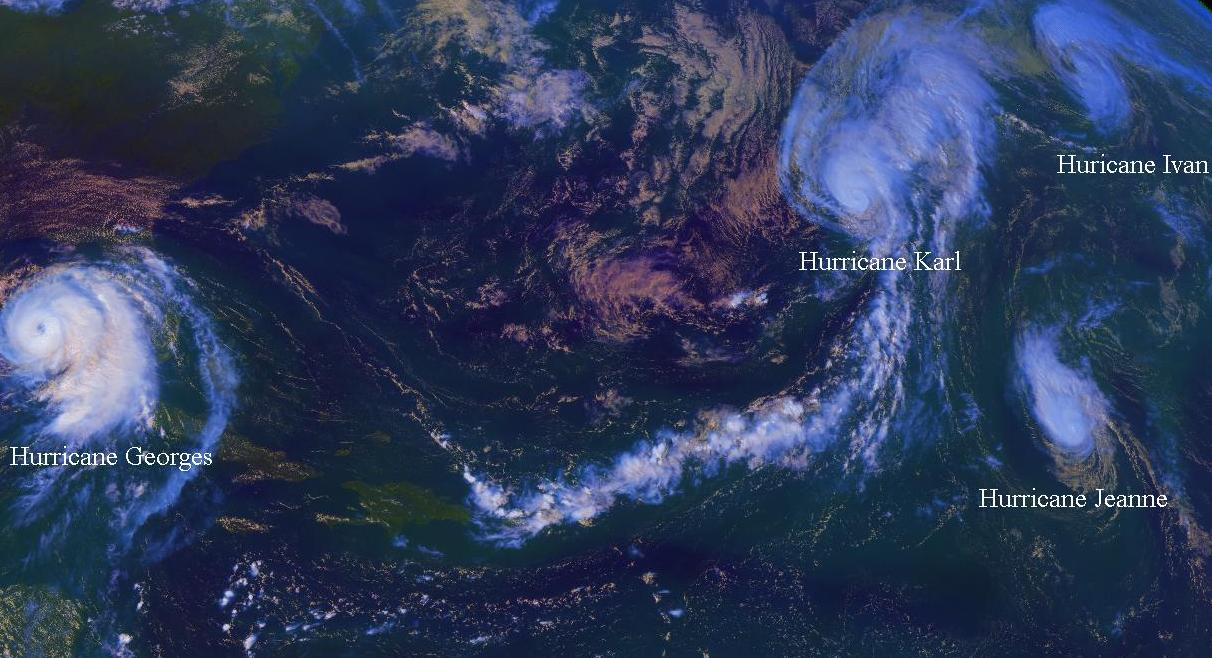
Katrina in the Australian basin, and cyclones Ron and Susan in the South Pacific basin are simultaneously active on January 5. Meanwhile on the North Atlantic basin, 4 hurricanes; Georges (west), Karl (west-northwest of Ivan), Jeanne (south of Karl), and Ivan (far right) were active on September 26.

During 1998, tropical cyclones formed within seven different tropical cyclone basins, located within various parts of the Atlantic, Pacific, and Indian Oceans. A total of 124 tropical cyclones formed, with 72 of them being named by various weather agencies when they attained maximum sustained winds of 35 knots (65 km/h, 40 mph). The strongest tropical cyclones were Zeb, Ron and Susan which peaked with a pressure of 900 hPa (26.58 inHg). Hurricane Mitch of late October was the deadliest tropical cyclone, killing 11,000 people as it catastrophically affected Central America, and Mexico as a Category 5 major hurricane. Meanwhile, Georges became the costliest, with the damages amounting to $9.37 billion, which also became the costliest in the history of the Dominican Republic and the country of Saint Kitts and Nevis. Throughout the year, four Category 5 tropical cyclones formed. The accumulated cyclone energy (ACE) index for the 1998 (seven basins combined), as calculated by Colorado State University was 773.1 units.

== Global atmospheric and hydrological conditions ==
A strong La Niña started in 1998 and persisted until early 2001.

== Summary ==
=== North Atlantic Ocean ===
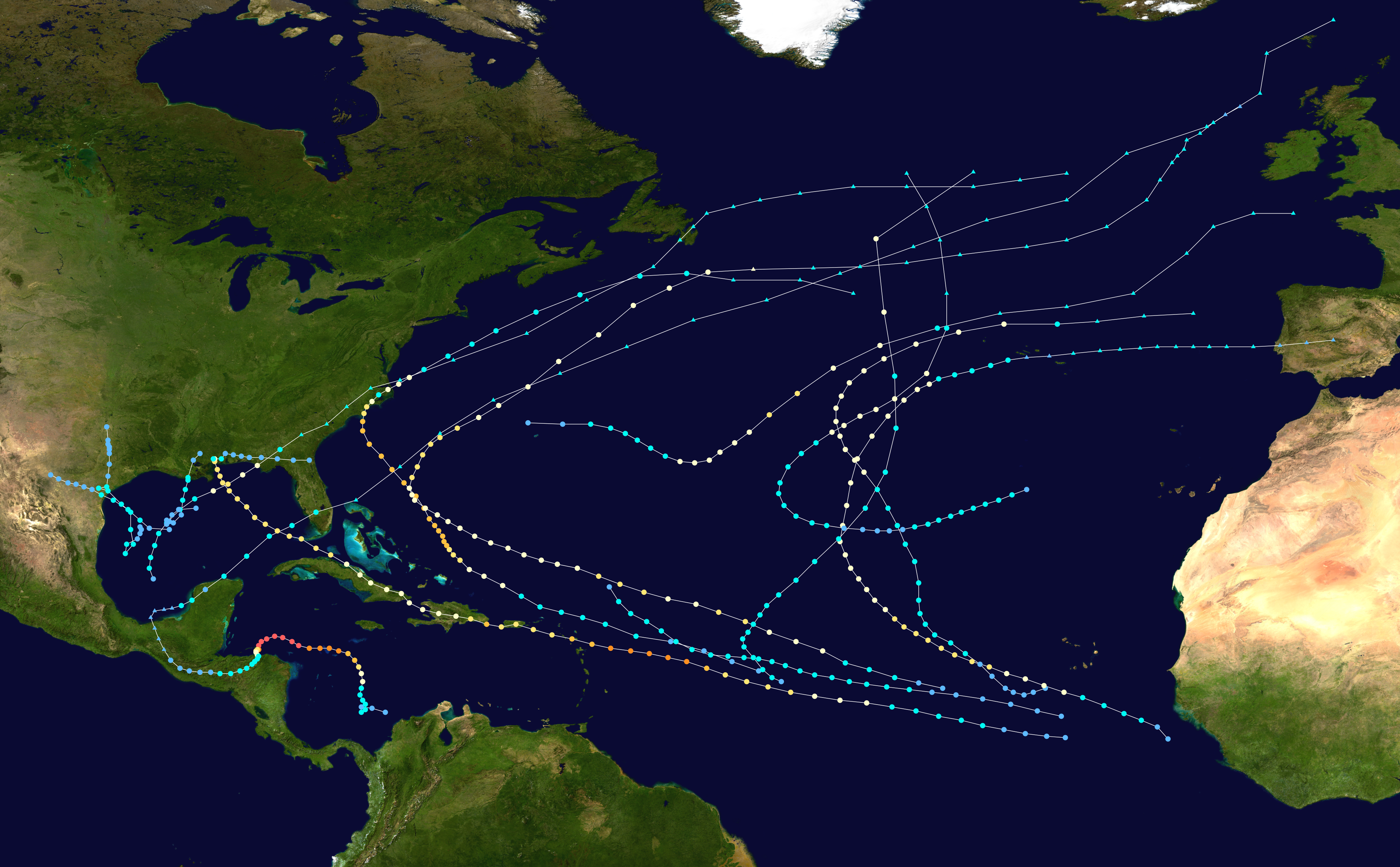
1998 Atlantic hurricane season summary map

An average Atlantic hurricane season features 12 tropical storms, 6 hurricanes, and 3 major hurricanes, and features an Accumulated Cyclone Energy (ACE) count of 106. In 1998 in the North Atlantic basin, most of the statistics fell well above listed.

The 1998 Atlantic hurricane season was one of the most disastrous Atlantic hurricane seasons on record, featuring the highest number of storm-related fatalities in over 218 years and one of the costliest ever at the time. The season had above average activity, due to the dissipation of the El Niño event and transition to La Niña conditions.

The most notable storms were Hurricane Georges and Hurricane Mitch. Georges devastated Saint Kitts and Nevis, Puerto Rico and the Dominican Republic as a major Category 3 storm but peaked as a high-end Category 4 hurricane just before moving through many of the Caribbean Islands before affecting the southern US mainland, making its landfall near Biloxi, Mississippi, causing significant damage and at least 600 confirmed deaths while Mitch, the strongest storm of the season, was a very powerful and destructive late-season Category 5 hurricane that affected much of Central America before making landfall in Florida as a tropical storm. The significant amount of rainfall that Mitch produced across Central America caused significant damage and killed at least 11,000 people, making the system the second deadliest Atlantic hurricane in recorded history, behind only the Great Hurricane of 1780. Mitch, was later tied with 2007's Hurricane Dean for the eighth-most intense Atlantic hurricane ever recorded.

Hurricanes Georges and Mitch caused $9.37 billion in damage and $6.08 billion (1998 USD) (Note: All damage figures are in 1998 United States dollars, unless otherwise noted) in damage, respectively and the 1998 Atlantic hurricane season was at the time, the second-costliest season ever, after the 1992 season. However, it is now the eleventh costliest season as it was surpassed by the 2005 Atlantic hurricane season.

=== Eastern and Central Pacific Ocean ===
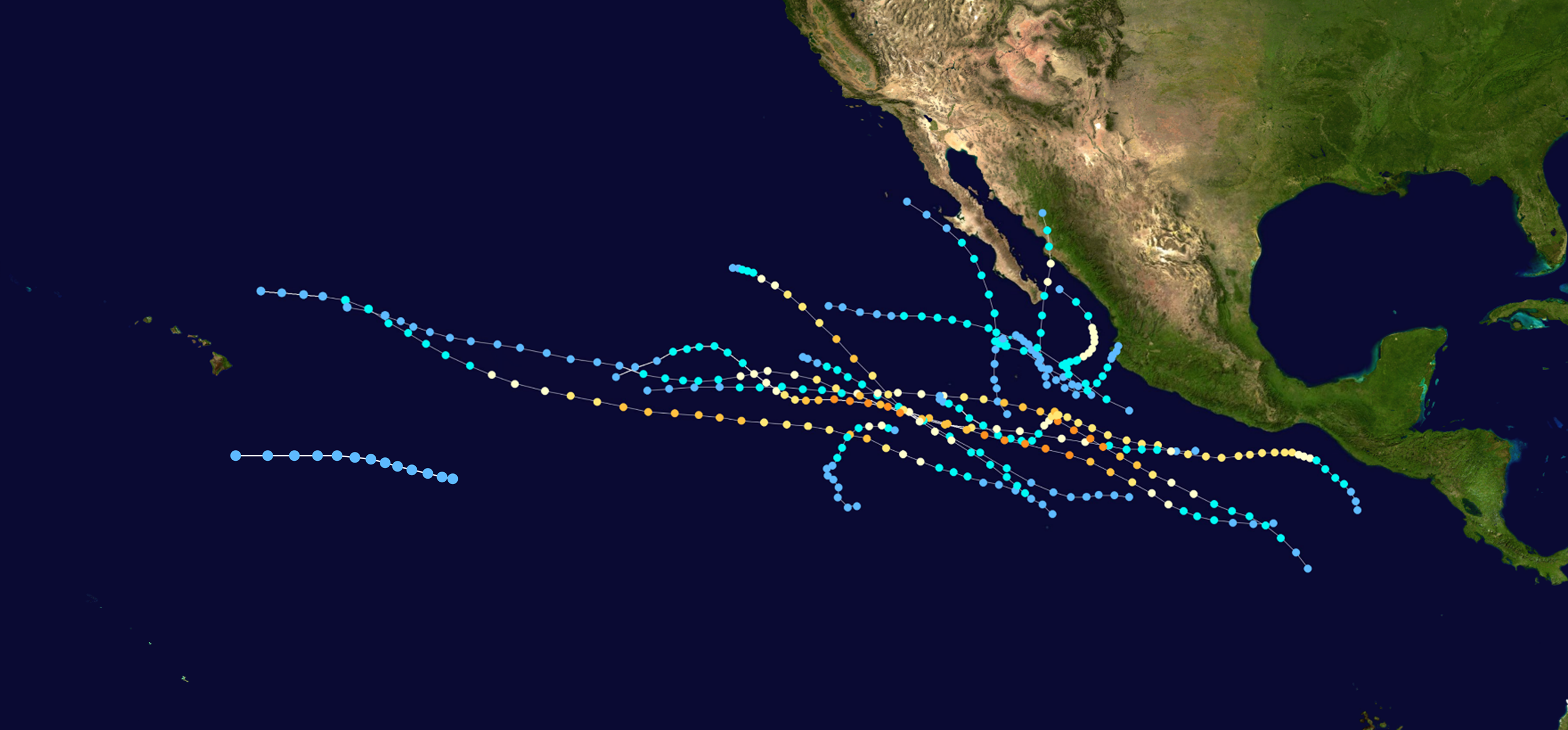
1998 Pacific hurricane season summary map

An average Pacific hurricane season features 15 tropical storms, 9 hurricanes, and 4 major hurricanes, and features an Accumulated Cyclone Energy (ACE) count of 132.

The season produced 13 named storms, slightly below the average of 15 named storms per season. However, the season total of nine hurricanes was one above the average, and the total of six major hurricanes surpassed the average of three. Activity during the season was hindered by the northward movement of the Intertropical Convergence Zone (ITCZ). The ITCZ, which is normally situated south of the Gulf of Tehuantepec, shifted northward into Central and Southern Mexico, making the cyclone closer to cooler sea surface temperatures, hence limiting the number of storms that formed during the season. Although a semi-permanent anticyclone persisted through the summer of 1998, causing most of the storms to remain at sea, some storm did threaten the Baja California Peninsula due to the weakness in the anticyclone. Except for Hurricane Kay, all of the storms of the season originated from tropical waves.

=== Western Pacific Ocean ===
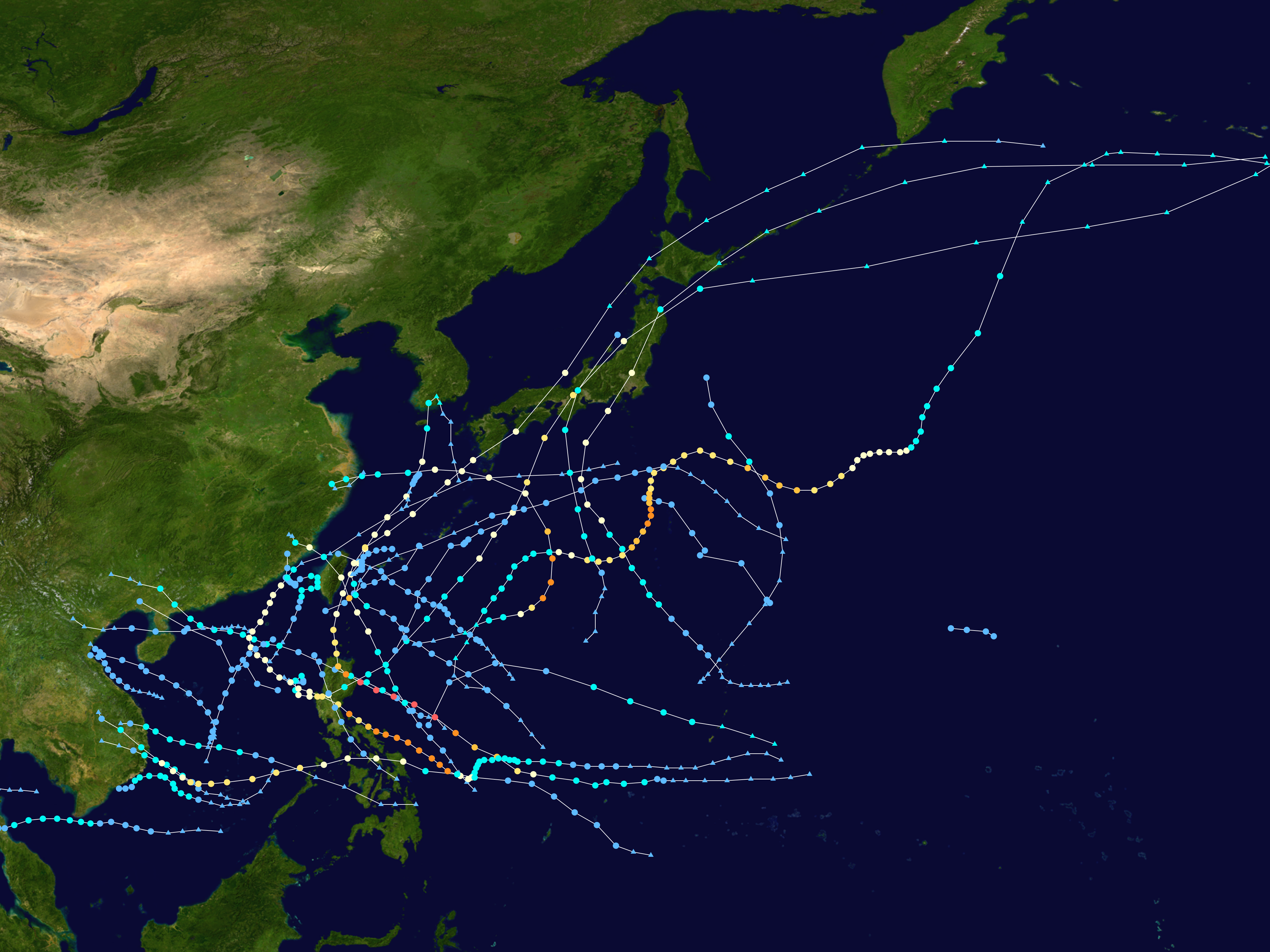
1998 Pacific typhoon season summary map

The average typhoon season lasts year-round, with the majority of the storms forming between May and October. An average Pacific typhoon season features 26 tropical storms, 16 typhoons, and 9 super typhoons (unofficial category). It also features an average Accumulated Cyclone Energy (ACE) count of approximately 294; the basin is typically the most active basin for tropical cyclone formation.

During the 1998 Pacific typhoon season, a total of 28 tropical depressions developed across the western Pacific basin. Of those 28 depressions, a total of 18 strengthened into tropical storms of which 9 further intensified into typhoons. The first tropical cyclone developed on May 28, marking the fourth latest start to any Pacific typhoon season on record, and the last one dissipated on December 22. The Philippine region also set a record: with only eleven storms forming or moving into its area of responsibility, PAGASA had its quietest season as of 2006. Overall inactivity was caused by an unusually strong La Niña, which also fueled a hyperactive Atlantic hurricane season that year.

=== North Indian Ocean ===
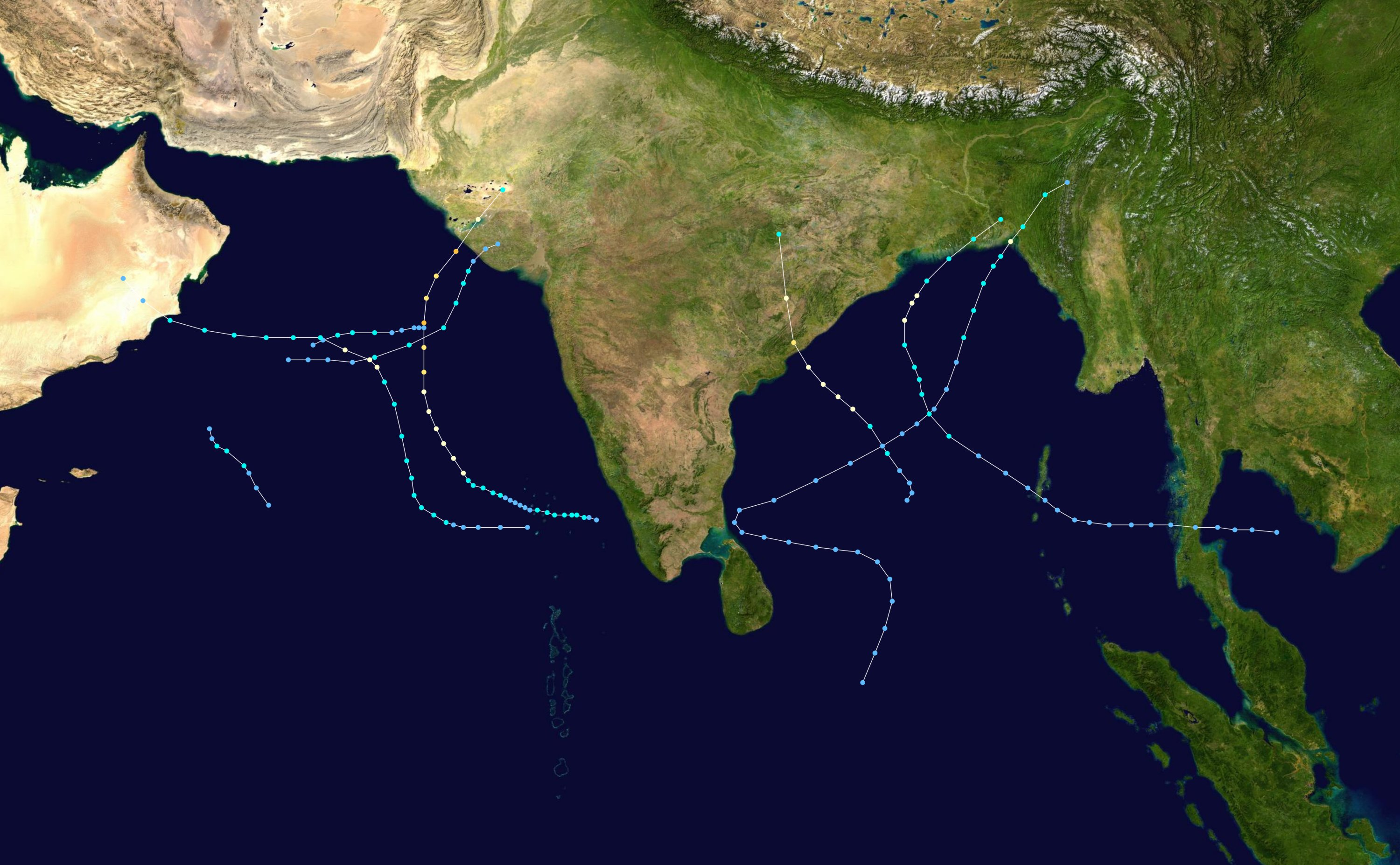
1998 North Indian Ocean cyclone season summary map

With eleven depressions and eight tropical cyclones, this was one of the most active seasons in the ocean along with 1987, 1996, and 2005. The season caused a large loss of life, most of which was from one storm. Over 10,000 people were killed in India when Tropical Cyclone 03A brought a 4.9-metre (16 ft) storm surge to the Kathiawar Peninsula, inundating numerous salt mines. Total damages from the storm amounted to Rs. 120 billion (US$3 billion). Tropical Cyclone 01B killed at least 26 people and left at least 4,000 fishermen missing in eastern Bangladesh on May 20. A short lived depression in mid-October killed 122 people after triggering severe flooding in Andhra Pradesh. In November, Tropical Cyclone 06B killed six people and caused property damage worth BTN 880 million (US$20.7 million) in eastern India. An additional 40 people were killed and 100 fishermen were listed as missing after Tropical Cyclone 07B affected Bangladesh.

=== South-West Indian Ocean ===
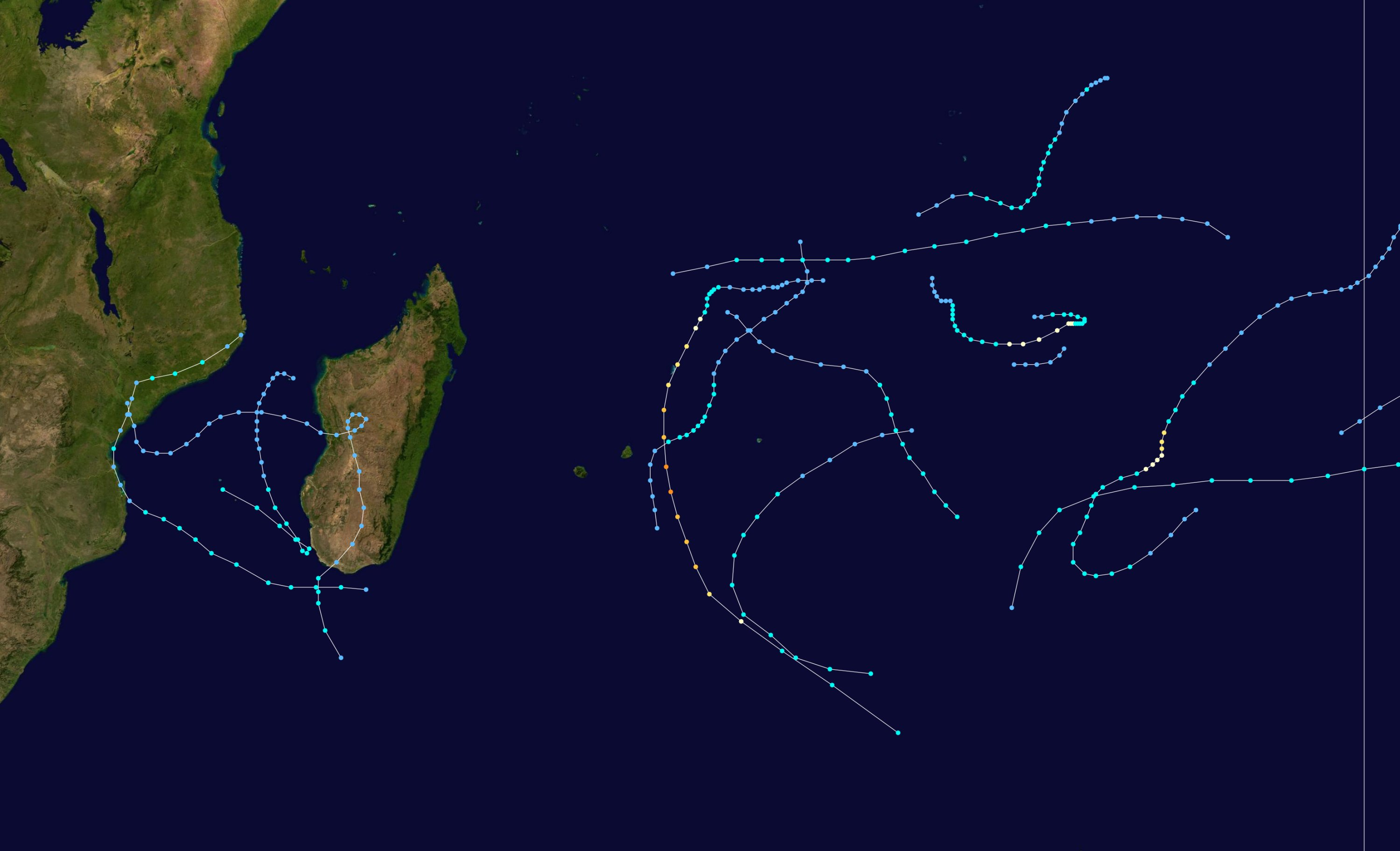
1997–98 South-West Indian Ocean cyclone season summary map

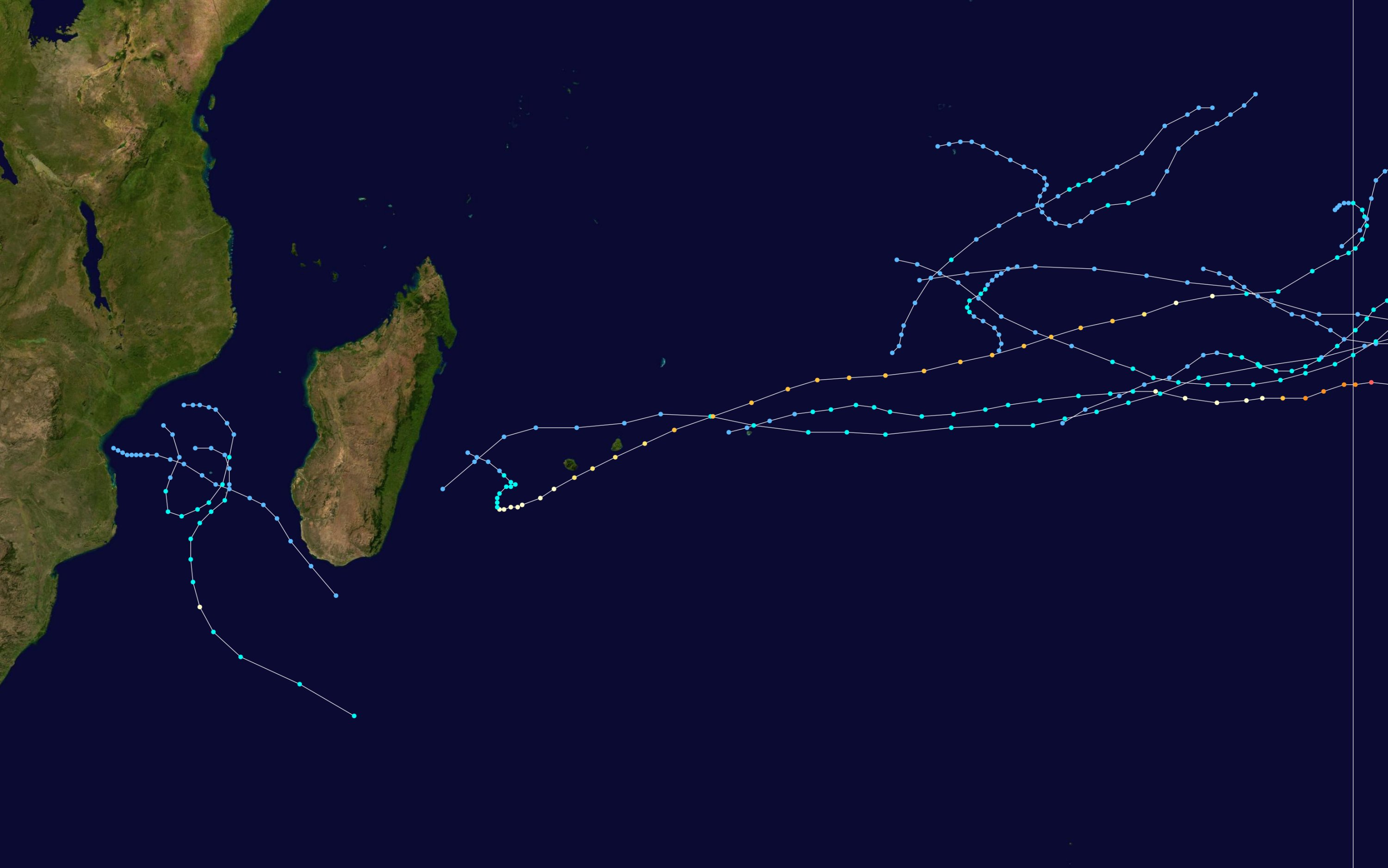
1998–99 South-West Indian Ocean cyclone season summary map

==== January–June ====
The 1997–98 South-West Indian Ocean cyclone season was fairly quiet and had the latest start in 30 years. The first tropical disturbance originated on January 16, although the first named storm, Anacelle, was not upgraded until February 8, a record late start. The last storm to dissipate was an unusually late tropical depression in late July. Many of the storms suffered from the effects of wind shear, which contributed to there being only one tropical cyclone – equivalent to a minimal hurricane. The season also occurred during a powerful El Niño.

Tropical Depression A1, the first of the season, moved throughout most of Mozambique in January, causing landslides and flooding. One landslide affected Milange District, where many houses were swept into a river. Landslides killed between 87 and 143 people in the country. In February, Cyclone Anacelle buffeted several islands with gusty winds after becoming the strongest storm of the season, reaching maximum sustained winds of 140 km/h (85 mph). Although Anacelle was the first named storm of the season, another tropical depression preceded it that crossed Madagascar several times. The depression eventually became Tropical Storm Beltane, and lasted 17 days. Beltane caused flooding across Madagascar due to heavy rainfall, which killed one person and left locally heavy crop damage. There were several other disturbances in February, including Cindy which dissipated 50 days after it originated, as well as a disturbance that brought heavy rainfall to Réunion and Mauritius. The rest of the season was fairly quiet, mostly with short-lived tropical disturbances or storms.

==== July–December ====
The first system of the season proper originated out of an area of convection in early September in the northeast portion of the basin. On September 3, the MFR initiated advisories on Tropical Disturbance A1 about 1435 km (890 mi) east of Diego Garcia. The system tracked westward, and the JTWC issued a Tropical Cyclone Formation Alert (TCFA) on September 4. Failing to intensify beyond winds of 45 km/h (30 mph), the disturbance dissipated on September 6. Later in the month, Tropical Disturbance A2 formed in a similar region within the monsoon trough, with the MFR initiating advisories on September 29. Also on that day, the JTWC began issuing advisories on Tropical Cyclone 02S. That day, the JTWC upgraded the system to tropical storm status, although strong wind shear prevented intensification. The MFR quickly discontinued advisories, but the JTWC continued tracking it, again upgrading the system to tropical storm status on October 1. After the shear again increased, the storm weakened, dissipating on October 2.

In November, rapidly weakening Tropical Cyclone Alison moved from the Australian basin and dissipated immediately upon entering the south-west Indian Ocean on November 13. On December 4, short-lived Tropical Disturbance A3 was classified by MFR, subsequently drifting into the Australian region. Possibly related to the previous system, Tropical Cyclone Cathy moved from the Australian basin into the basin on December 28, quickly dissipating.

=== Australian Region ===
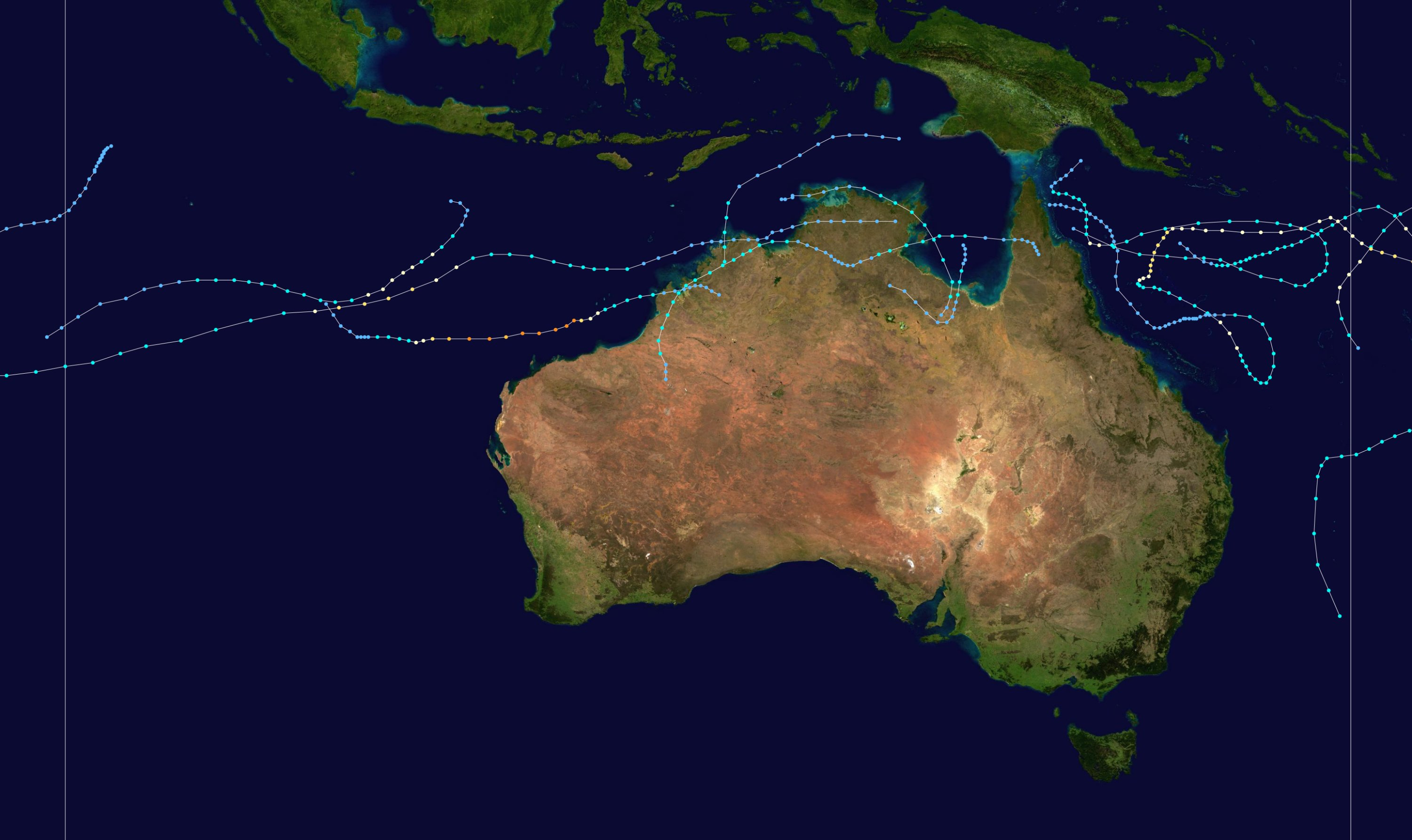
1997–98 Australian region cyclone season summary map

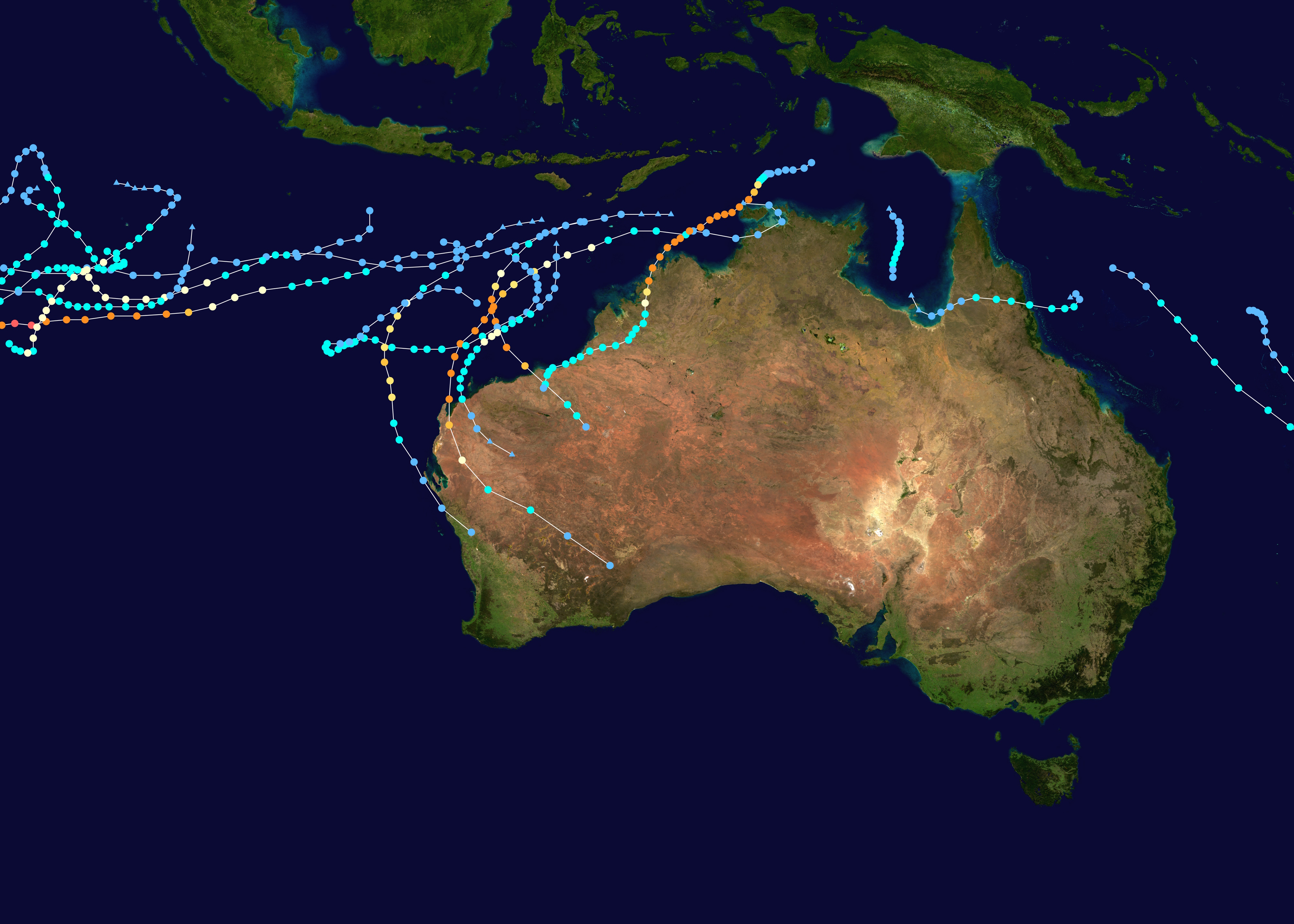
1998–99 Australian region cyclone season summary map

==== January–June ====
The 1997–98 Australian region cyclone season was a slightly below-average tropical cyclone season. Cyclone Katrina formed on January 1, which erratically moved around Australia in its lifetime. Tiffany and Les also formed in January, affecting Western Australia and Northern Territory, with the latter causing 3 deaths. Cyclone Victor formed from a tropical low that was the remnant low of Cyclone Katrina, before renaming Cindy as it crossed to the South-West Indian Ocean basin. A tropical low also crossed to the same basin, which strengthened to Tropical Cyclone Elsie before weakening. Nathan also formed in March, peaking as a Category 2 cyclone before dissipating on March 26. The post-tropical cyclone that was former Yali in the South Pacific crossed the region before re-exiting the basin towards New Zealand. The last tropical low of the season dissipated on April 19 as it brought downpour to the Western Australia.

==== July–December ====
On 7 October, a tropical low near the Cocos (Keeling) Islands strengthened to Tropical Cyclone Zelia, while becoming the first storm of the season. It weakened due to wind shear and dissipated on 10 October. A month later, Alison developed over the open waters near Western Australia, peaking as a severe tropical cyclone before passing near Cocos Islands, bringing gale-force winds before dissipating on 13 November, shortly before crossing to the South-West Indian Ocean basin. Billy and Thelma both affected Western Australia and Northern Territory both as severe tropical cyclones, with the latter causing a death, ten months after the cyclone's passage. A disturbance crossed to the basin, before degenerating afterwards. Cathy was believed to be the remnant low of the former disturbance. Peaking as a Category 2 cyclone, it exited the basin on 28 December before dissipating immediately. The last disturbance formed near Brisbane before dissipating on 2 January.

=== South Pacific Ocean ===
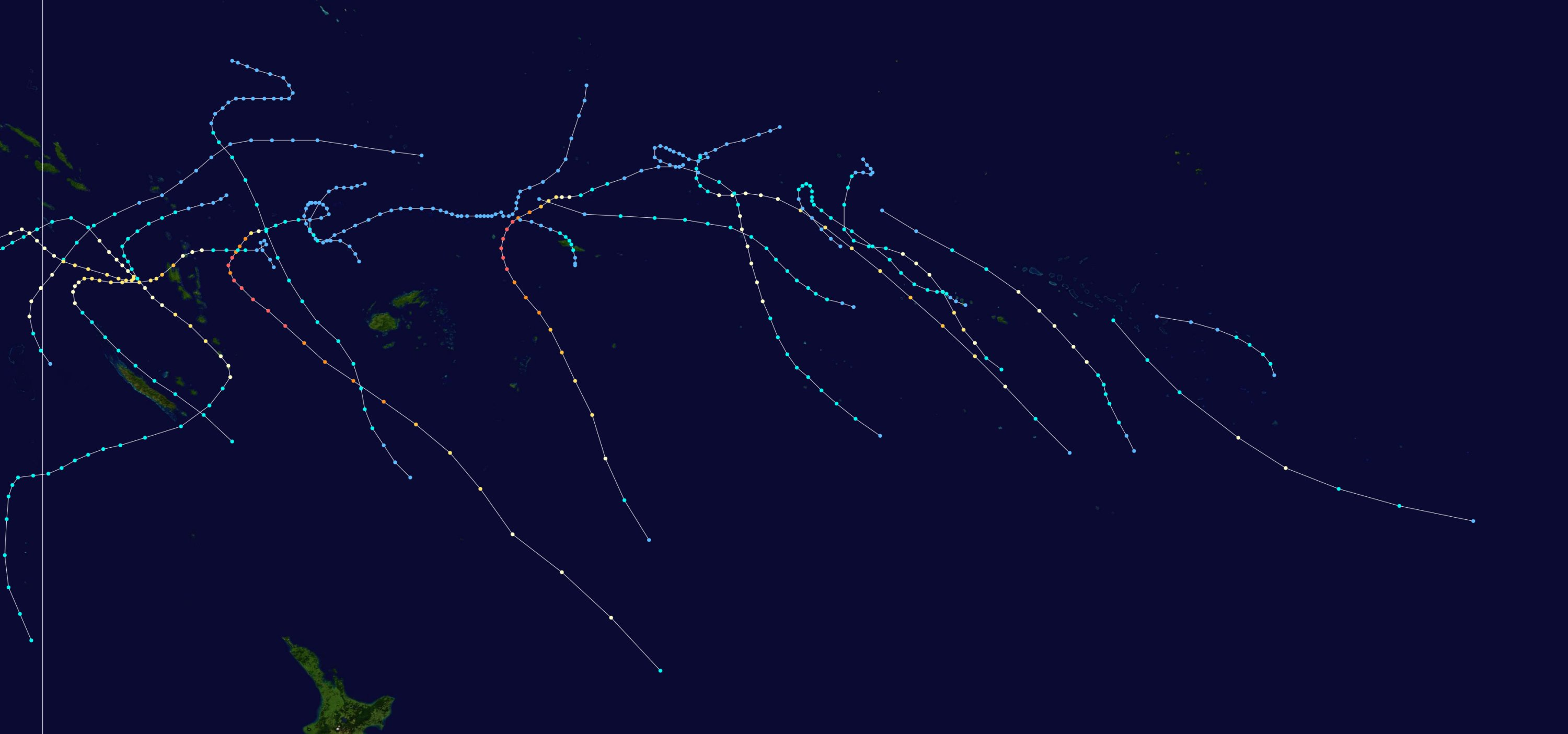
1997–98 South Pacific Ocean cyclone season summary map

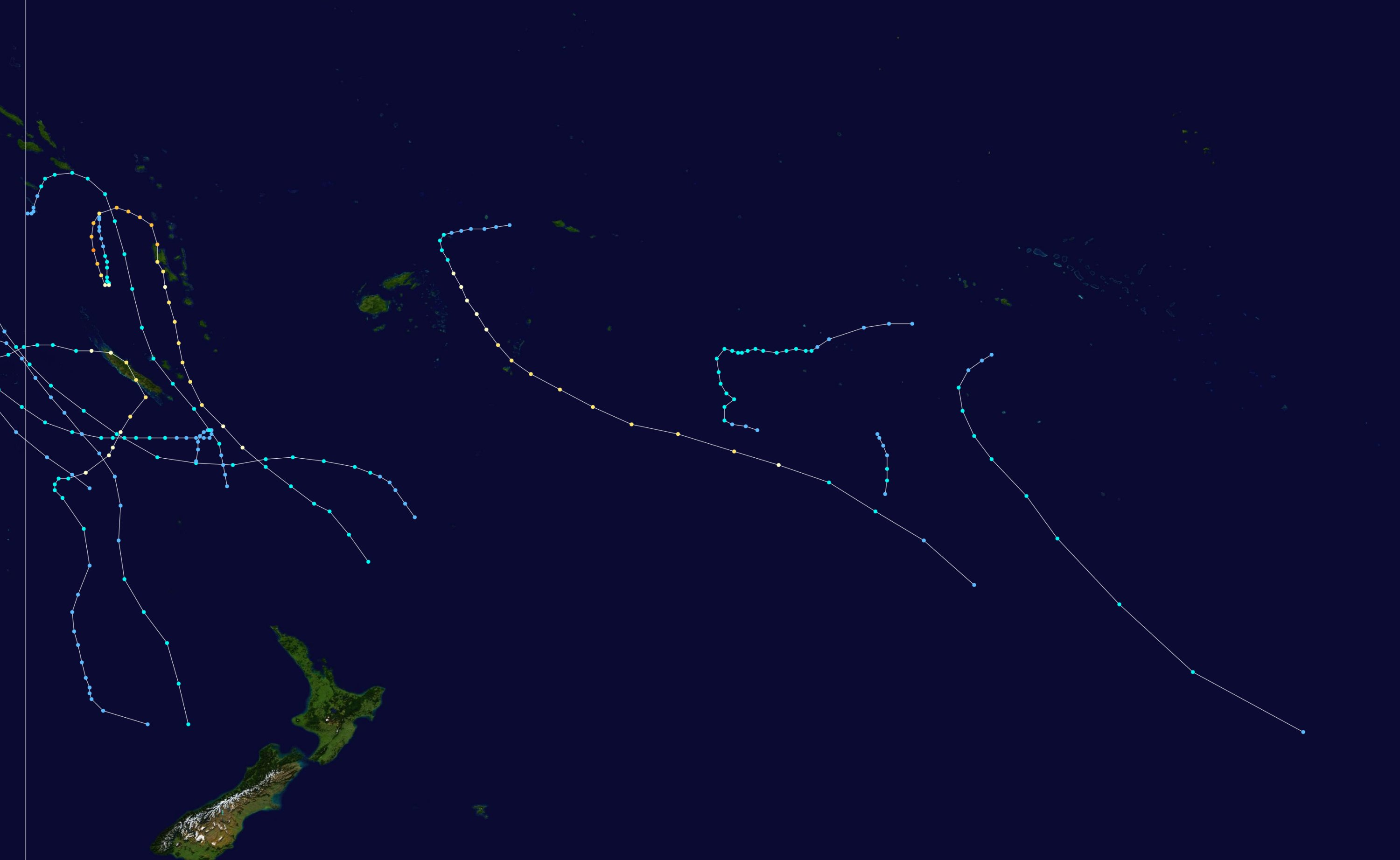
1998–99 South Pacific Ocean cyclone season summary map

==== January–June ====
The 1997–98 season was one of the most active and longest South Pacific tropical cyclone seasons on record, with 16 tropical cyclones occurring within the South Pacific basin between 160°E and 120°W. The season was characterised by a very strong El Niño event, which caused the South Pacific convergence zone, to move from its usual position near the Solomon Islands to the Northern Cook Islands. As a result, ten tropical cyclones formed to the east of the International Date Line, with seven of these tropical cyclones going on to affect French Polynesia.

Severe Tropical Cyclones Ron and Susan were both the strongest tropical cyclones of the season and were thought to be the strongest tropical cyclones in the region since Severe Tropical Cyclone Hina of the 1984–85 season.

After the final warnings on Cyclone Tui were issued a weak circulation remained in the vicinity of Samoa for several days, before a westerly surge from the monsoon resulted in a tropical cyclone developing during February 1. However, due to uncertainties in the continuation of Tui after several other weak low-pressure areas had formed, the FMS decided to treat the cyclone as a separate system and named it Wes.

Tropical Cyclone Bart developed during the final days of the season and caused ten deaths and minor damage to French Polynesia, before it dissipated during May 3. The names Katrina, Martin, Nute, Osea, Ron, Susan, Tui, Ursula and Veli, were subsequently retired from the lists of names for the region.

==== July–December ====
The 1998–99 South Pacific cyclone season was a near-average South Pacific tropical cyclone season, with 8 tropical cyclones occurring within the South Pacific Ocean basin between 160°E and 120°W. Despite the season starting on November 1, the first tropical system of the season did not form until December 1, while the final disturbance of the season dissipated on May 27, 1999. During the season the most intense tropical cyclone was Severe Tropical Cyclone Cora, which had a minimum pressure of 930 hPa (27.46 inHg). After the season had ended the names Cora along with Dani in 1999 were retired from the naming lists, after they had caused significant impacts on South Pacific islands.

The first, Tropical Disturbance 01F, developed about 540 km (340 mi) to the northwest of Apia in American Samoa, however, the system remained weak and was last noted later that day. On December 11, the JTWC started to monitor an area of disturbed weather that had developed within a trough of low pressure, about 670 km (415 mi) to the northeast of Honiara in the Solomon Islands. The depression turned to the south and accelerated as it began to lose tropical characteristics. It passed about 210 nmi west of Norfolk Island and had become extratropical about 400 nmi west-northwest of New Zealand's North Cape on December 17. 02F and Cora followed suit, with the latter affecting Fiji and Tonga. On December 25, Tropical Disturbance 04F developed over the Coral Sea within an area of strong vertical wind shear in the Australian region. During that day 04F moved towards the southeast and entered the South Pacific basin, before dissipating on December 26.

=== Mediterranean Sea ===
A medicane was observed from 25 to 27 January.

== Systems ==
=== January ===
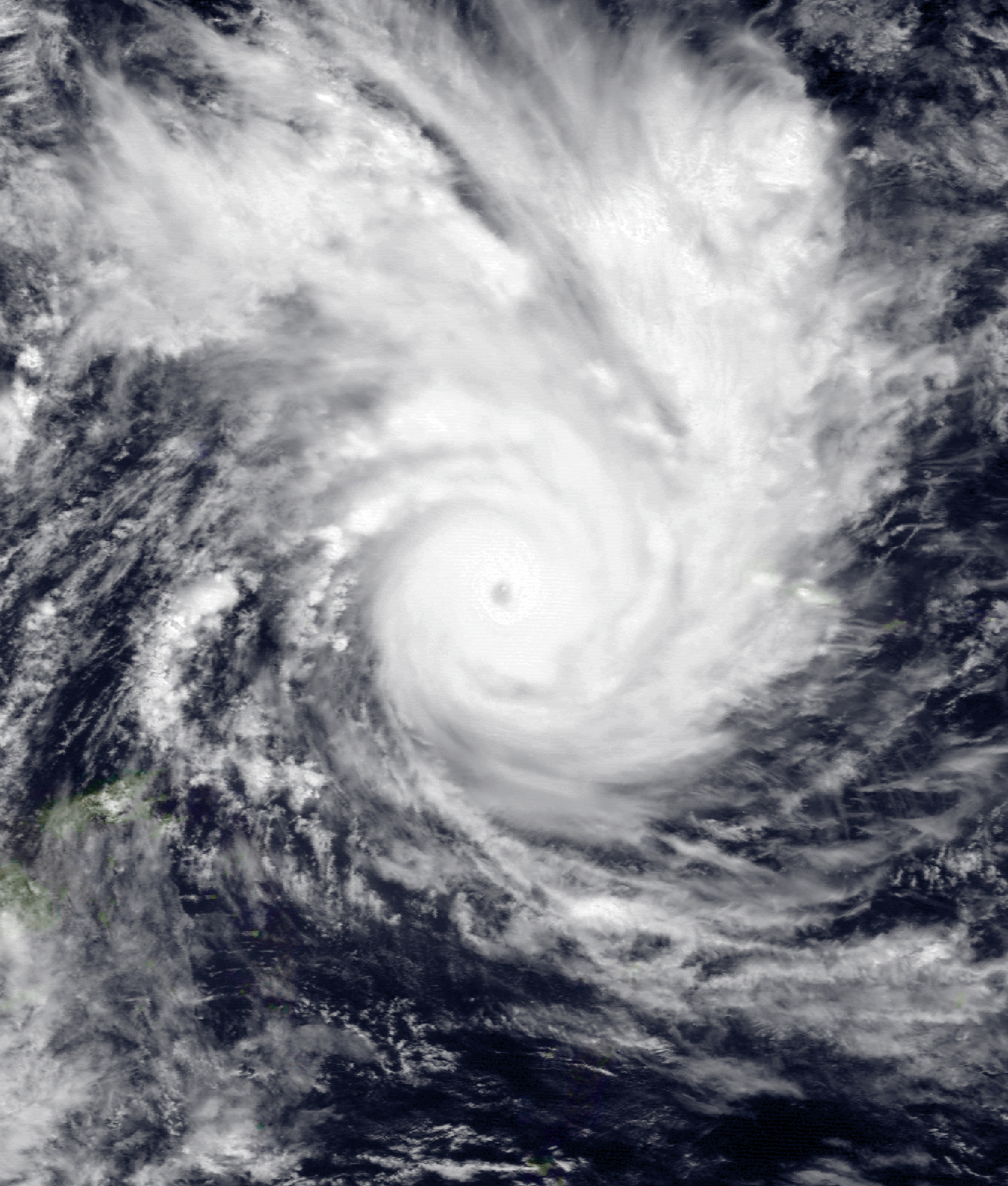
Cyclone Ron

The month of January was relatively active, with 9 tropical cyclones forming, with 8 of them are being named.

Tropical cyclones formed in January 1998
Storm name	Dates active	Max wind km/h (mph)	Min pressure (hPa)	Areas affected	Damage (USD)	Deaths	Refs
Ron	January 1–9	230 (145)	900	Samoan Islands, Tonga, Wallis and Futuna	$566 thousand	None	
Katrina	January 1–25	165 (105)	940	Solomon Islands, Vanuatu, Far North Queensland	$8.66 million	2	
A1	January 16–23	60 (35)	995	Mozambique, Comoros, Malawi, Europa Island	Unknown	≥ 87	
Les	January 19 – February 1	110 (70)	976	Queensland, Northern Territory, Western Australia	$64.7 million	3	
Tiffany	January 22 – February 2	170 (105)	940	Western Australia	None	None	
Tui	January 25–27	75 (45)	990	Samoan Islands	$1 million	1	
Ursula	January 29 – February 2	110 (70)	975	French Polynesia	Minor	None	
Veli	January 30 – February 3	100 (65)	980	French Polynesia	Minor	None	
Wes	January 31 – February 5	95 (60)	985	Cook Islands, French Polynesia	Unknown	10	

=== February ===
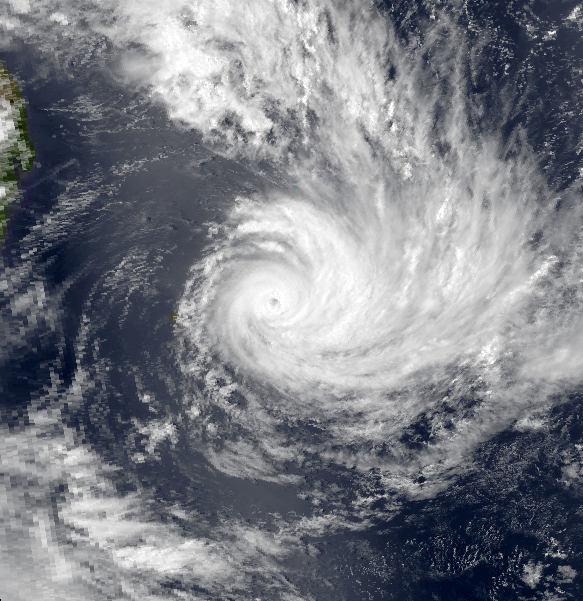
Cyclone Anacelle

Like the previous month, the month of February featured nine storms, of which four are respectively named.

Tropical cyclones formed in February 1998
Storm name	Dates active	Max wind km/h (mph)	Min pressure (hPa)	Areas affected	Damage (USD)	Deaths	Refs
Beltane	February 3 – 20	65 (40)	992	Madagascar, Europa Island, Mozambique	Unknown	1	
Anacelle	February 6 – 13	140 (85)	950	St. Brandon, Mauritius	None	None	
Victor-Cindy	February 8 – 19	120 (75)	970	Northern Territory, Western Australia	None	None	
Unnamed	February 11 – 15	65 (40)	995	None	None	None	
D1	February 16 – 19	Unknown	Not specified	Unknown	None	None	
D2	February 18 – 25	Unknown	Not specified	Mauritius, Réunion	Unknown	Unknown	
May	February 25 – 26	75 (45)	990	Northern Territory	None	None	
Unnamed	February 28 – March 2	45 (30)	997	None	None	None	
Unnamed	February 28 – March 1	45 (30)	998	None	None	None	

=== March ===
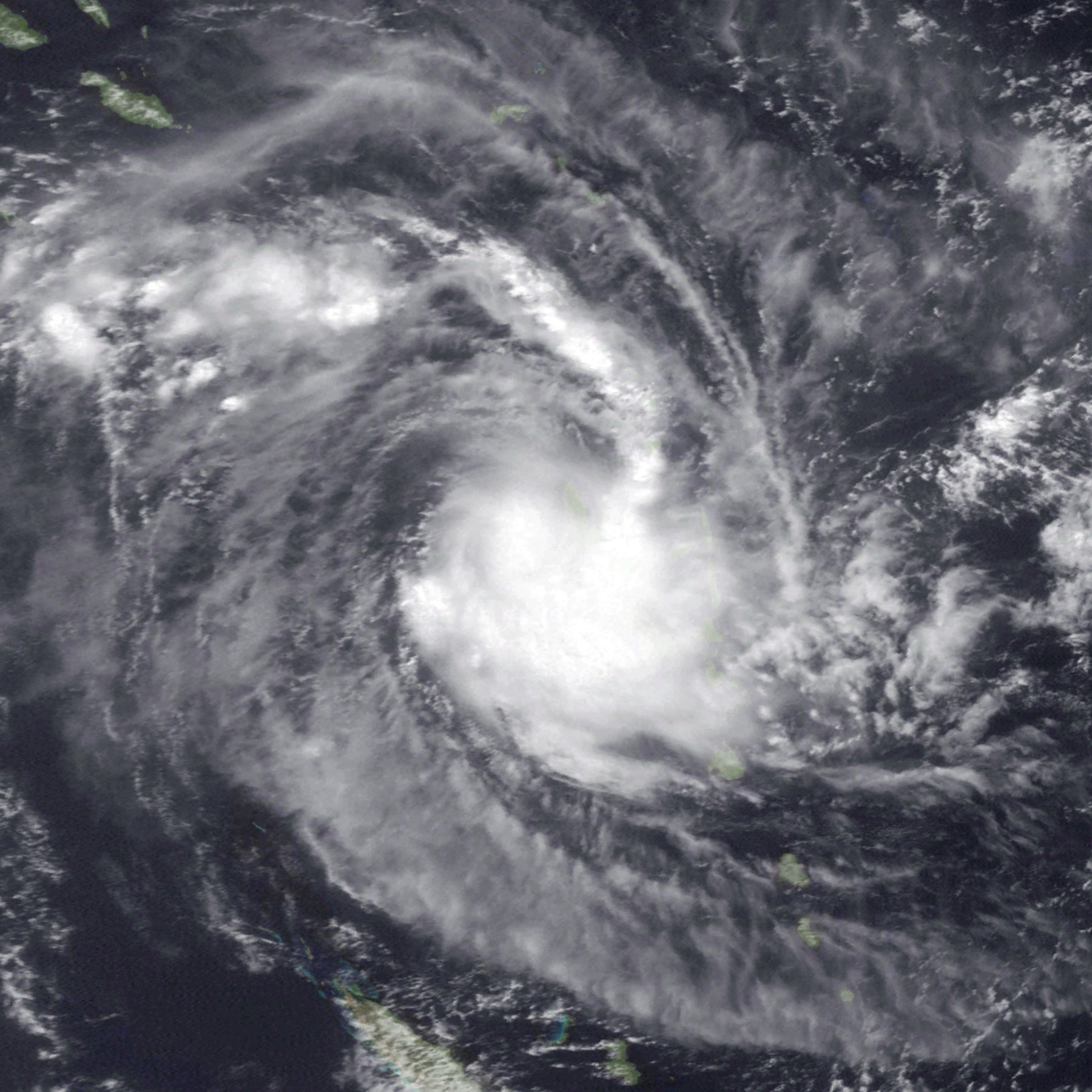
Cyclone Zuman

The month of March featured 7 tropical cyclones forming, with 6 of them are being named.

Tropical cyclones formed in March 1998
Storm name	Dates active	Max wind km/h (mph)	Min pressure (hPa)	Areas affected	Damage (USD)	Deaths	Refs
Unspecified	March 2–5	Unknown	Not specified	Unknown	None	None	
Donaline	March 4–10	75 (45)	988	None	None	None	
Elsie	March 7–18	100 (65)	975	None	None	None	
Fiona	March 15–20	55 (35)	995	Mascarene Islands	None	None	
Yali	March 18–27	130 (80)	965	Vanuatu, New Caledonia, New Zealand	Minimal	1	
Nathan	March 20–26	95 (60)	990	Far North Queensland, Willis Islands, Papua New Guinea	Unknown	None	
Zuman	March 29 – April 5	150 (90)	955	Vanuatu, New Caledonia, New Zealand	Unknown	Unknown	

=== April ===
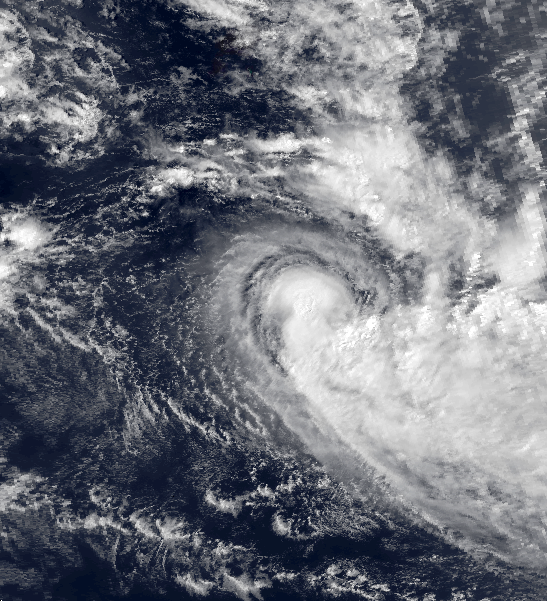
Tropical Storm Gemma

6 systems formed in April, with 3 of them are respectively named.

Tropical cyclones formed in April 1998
Storm name	Dates active	Max wind km/h (mph)	Min pressure (hPa)	Areas affected	Damage (USD)	Deaths	Refs
Gemma	April 7 – 14	85 (50)	985	None	None	None	
Unnamed (33S)	April 7	Unknown	Not specified	None	None	None	
Alan	April 17 – 26	75 (45)	992	French Polynesia	Unknown	10	
Unnamed (34S)	April 19 – 22	65 (40)	Not specified	None	None	None	
TL	April 19	65 (40)	1002	Western Australia	None	None	
Bart	April 28 – May 3	85 (50)	987	French Polynesia	Minimal	10	

=== May ===
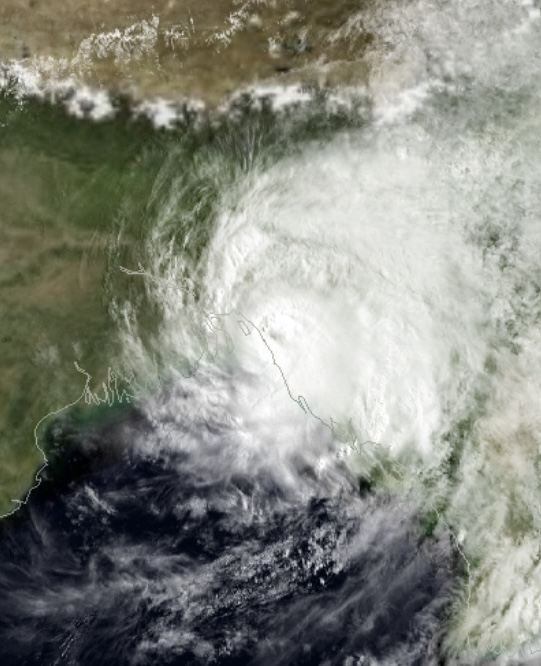
Cyclone BOB 01

The month of May was abnormally inactive, with none of the three tropical cyclones forming intensifying into named storms. Due to the inactivity, Cyclonic Storm BOB 01 was the most intense storm this month, with a minimum barometric pressure of 972 hPa, and a maximum 3-min sustained wind speed of 70 MPH.

Tropical cyclones formed in May 1998
Storm name	Dates active	Max wind km/h (mph)	Min pressure (hPa)	Areas affected	Damage (USD)	Deaths	Refs
BOB 01	May 17 – 20	110 (70)	972	India, Bangladesh	Unknown	35	
TD	May 28 – 29	Not specified	1002	Taiwan, Ryukyu Islands	None	None	
ARB 01 (02A)	May 28 – 29	45 (30)	997	None	None	None	

=== June ===
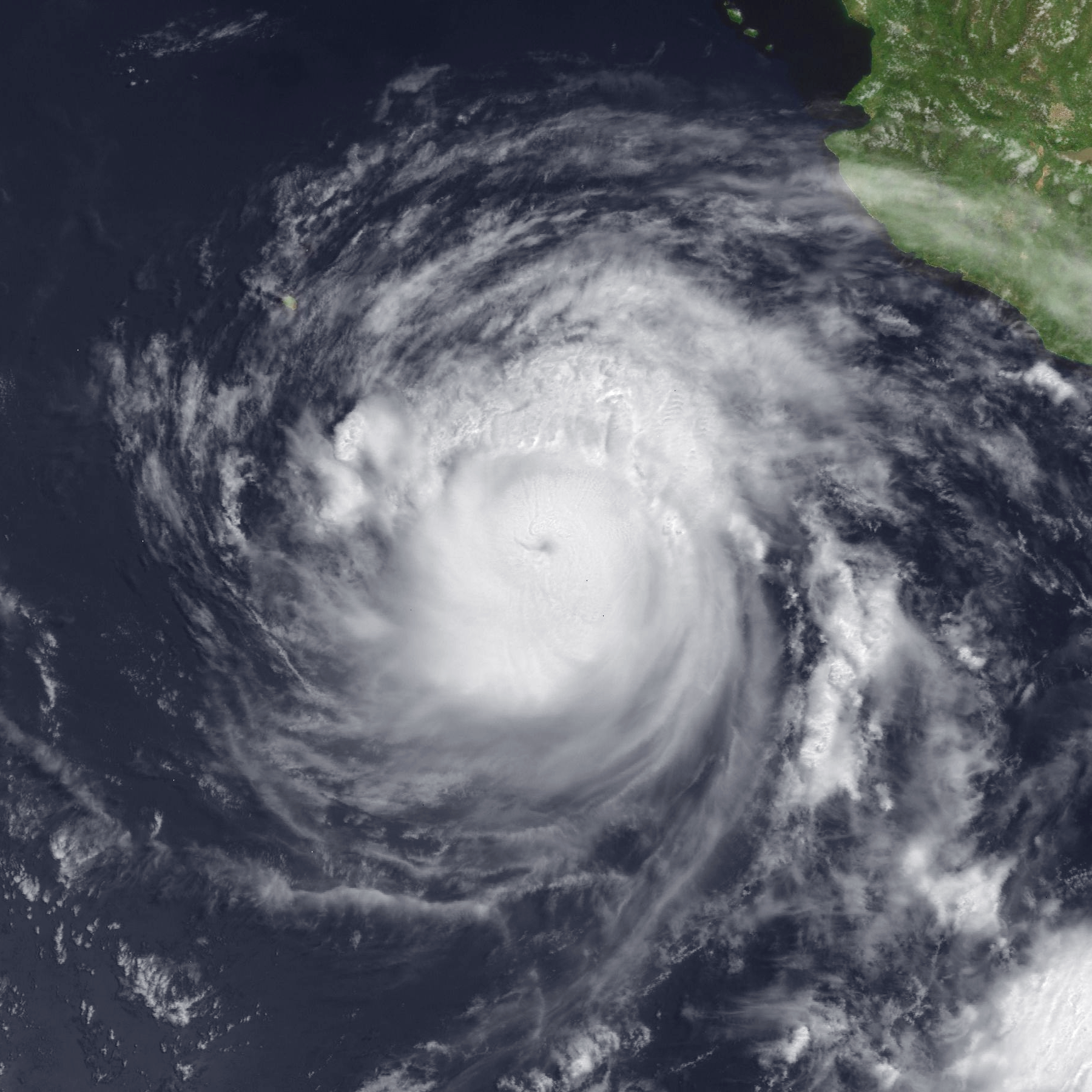
Hurricane Blas

Tropical cyclones formed in June 1998
Storm name	Dates active	Max wind km/h (mph)	Min pressure (hPa)	Areas affected	Damage (USD)	Deaths	Refs
ARB 02	June 4–10	165 (105)	958	India, Pakistan	$3 billion	4,000-10,000	
Agatha	June 11–16	100 (65)	993	None	None	None	
BOB 02	June 13–15	55 (35)	992	India	None	None	
Two-E	June 19–22	55 (35)	1003	None	None	None	
Blas	June 22–30	220 (140)	943	None	None	None	(Note: The Associated Press attributed 4 deaths from a mudslide in Michoacán to Blas. However, as the primary convection remained offshore, the National Hurricane Center did not consider the deaths related to the hurricane.)

=== July ===
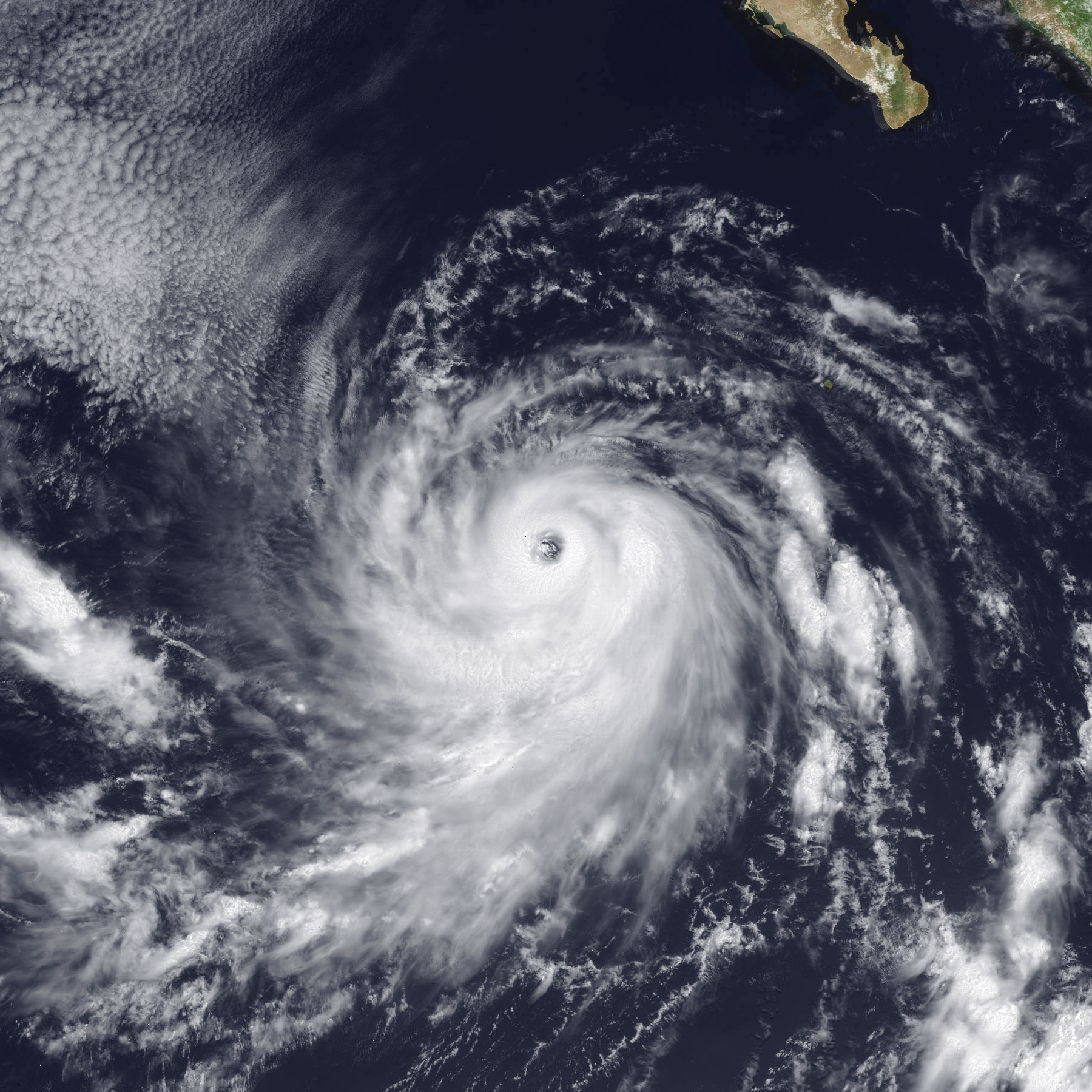
Hurricane Estelle

Tropical cyclones formed in July 1998
Storm name	Dates active	Max wind km/h (mph)	Min pressure (hPa)	Areas affected	Damage (USD)	Deaths	Refs
01W (Akang)	July 7–12	55 (35)	1002	Taiwan	None	None	
Nichole	July 8–10	60 (40)	998	China, Taiwan	Unknown	None	
Celia	July 17–21	95 (60)	997	None	None	None	
H4	July 20–23	Unknown	Not specified	None	None	None	
TD	July 23–25	Not specified	1004	None	None	None	
Darby	July 23 – August 1	185 (115)	958	None	None	None	
03W	July 25	55 (35)	1008	None	None	None	
Alex	July 27 – August 2	85 (50)	1000	None	None	None	
Estelle	July 29 – August 8	215 (130)	948	Baja California Sur, Hawaii	None	None	

=== August ===
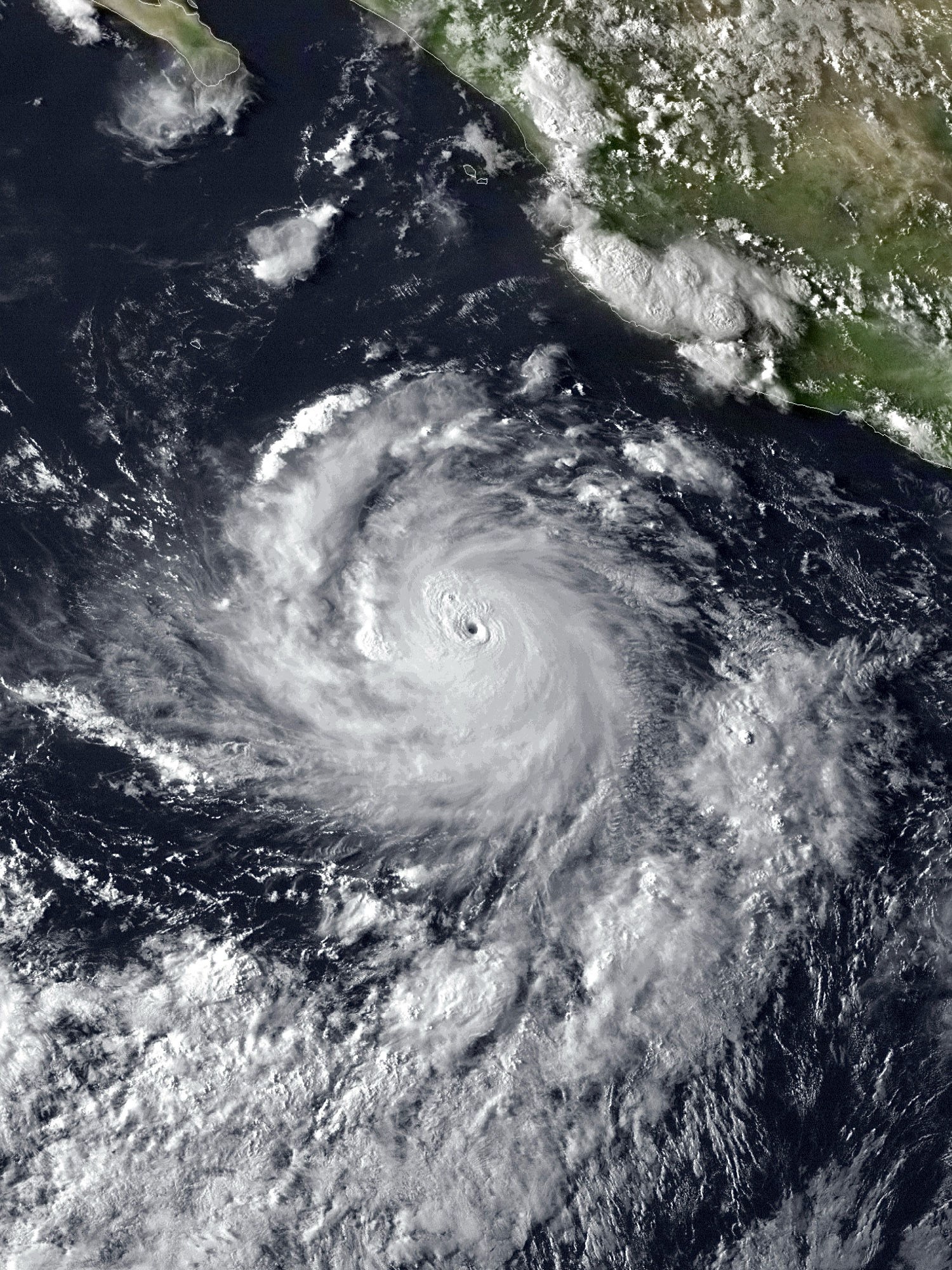
Hurricane Howard

Tropical cyclones formed in August 1998
Storm name	Dates active	Max wind km/h (mph)	Min pressure (hPa)	Areas affected	Damage (USD)	Deaths	Refs
Otto (Bising)	August 1–6	120 (75)	970	Philippines, Taiwan, China	$761 thousand	5	
Frank	August 6–10	75 (45)	1001	Baja California Peninsula, Southwestern United States	None	3	
Penny (Klaring)	August 6–11	95 (60)	985	Philippines, China	None	1	
Georgette	August 11–17	185 (115)	960	None	None	None	
One-C	August 16–18	55 (35)	1010	None	None	None	
Bonnie	August 19–30	185 (115)	954	Leeward Islands, North Carolina, Mid-Atlantic States	$1 billion	5	
Howard	August 20–30	240 (150)	932	None	None	None	
Charley	August 21–24	110 (70)	1000	Texas, Mexico	$50 million	24	
TD	August 21–22	Not specified	1004	None	None	None	
Rex (Deling)	August 23 – September 6	140 (85)	955	Japan	Unknown	13	
Danielle	August 24 – September 3	165 (105)	960	Eastern Seaboard, Northeastern United States, Canadian Maritimes, British Isles	$50 thousand	None	
Earl	August 31 – September 3	155 (100)	985	Florida, Georgia, Carolinas, Atlantic Canada	$79 million	3	

=== September ===
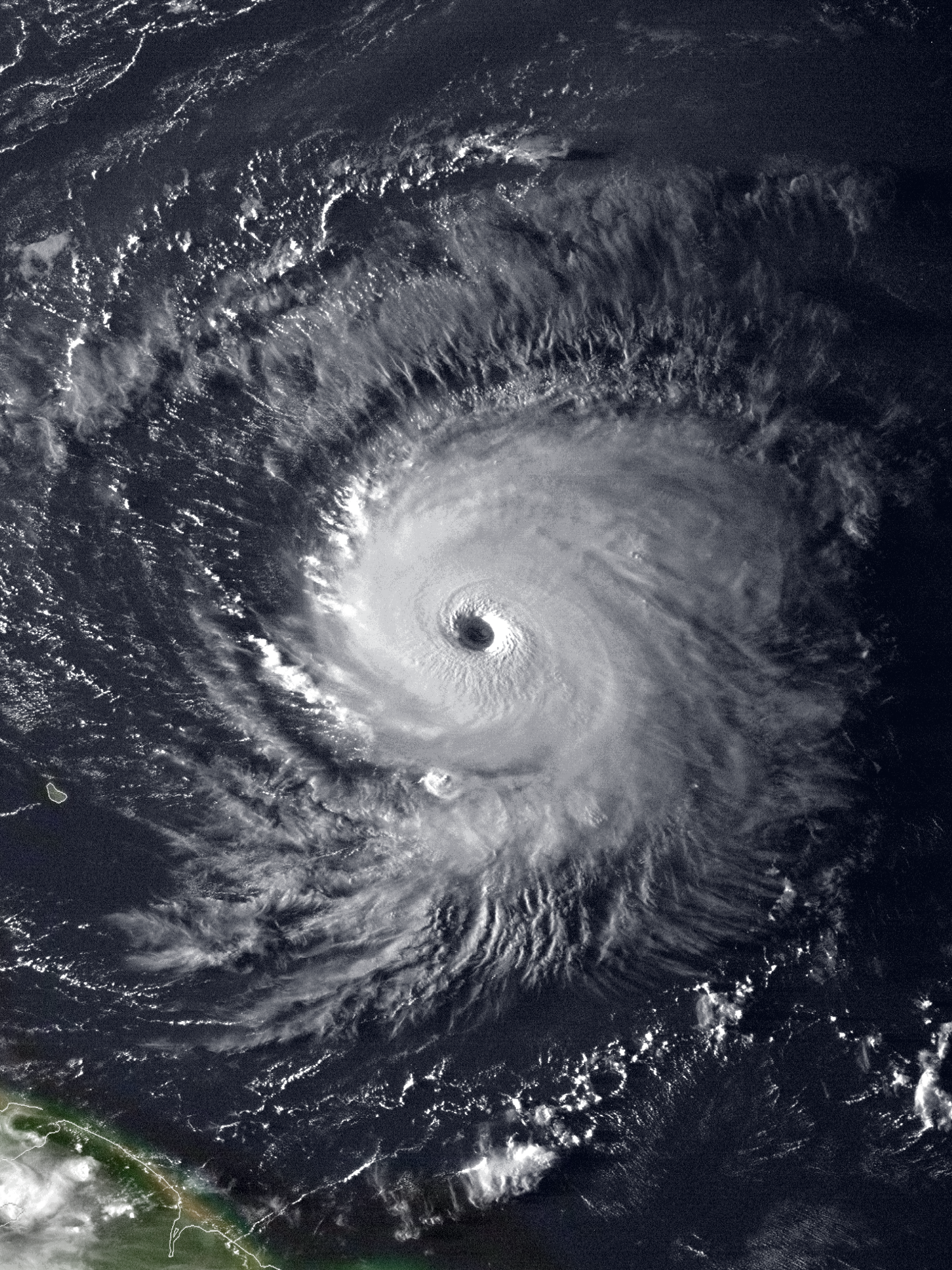
Hurricane Georges

Tropical cyclones formed in September 1998
Storm name	Dates active	Max wind km/h (mph)	Min pressure (hPa)	Areas affected	Damage (USD)	Deaths	Refs
Isis	September 1–3	120 (75)	988	Baja California Peninsula, Mexico, Southwestern United States, Northwestern United States	$10 million	14	
07W	September 1–4	55 (35)	1002	None	None	None	
A1	September 3–6	45 (30)	Not specified	None	None	None	
Javier	September 6–14	95 (60)	990	Mexico	Unknown	None	
TD	September 7–8	Not specified	1004	None	None	None	
Frances	September 8–13	100 (65)	990	Texas, Louisiana, Midwestern United States	$500 million	Unknown	(Note: There were at least 229 deaths, although a government report on the flooding indicated there were over 1000 people killed or missing.)
Stella	September 11–16	110 (70)	965	Japan, Mariana Islands	$2.17 million	3	
09W	September 13–14	55 (35)	998	China, Vietnam	None	None	
Georges	September 15 – October 1	250 (155)	937	Leeward Islands, Puerto Rico, Dominican Republic, Haiti, Cuba, Florida Keys, Louisiana, Mississippi, Alabama, Florida, Georgia	$9.37 billion	604	
Todd (Emang)	September 15–20	140 (85)	955	Ryukyu Islands, Japan, China	$236 thousand	7	
Hermine	September 17–20	75 (45)	999	Louisiana, Mississippi, Alabama, Florida, Georgia	$85 thousand	2	(Note: Hermine did not directly cause any direct fatalities; however, it may have contributed to two deaths, in Florida and Louisiana.)
Vicki	September 17–22	140 (85)	960	Philippines, Japan	$81.7 million	108	
12W	September 18–19	55 (35)	1000	Vietnam	None	None	
Waldo	September 19–21	85 (50)	994	Japan	None	None	
Ivan	September 19–27	150 (90)	975	None	None	None	
Jeanne	September 21 – October 1	165 (105)	969	Cape Verde, Portugal, Spain	None	None	
Karl	September 23–28	165 (105)	970	Bermuda, Azores	None	None	
Yanni (Heling)	September 26–30	120 (75)	965	Philippines, Taiwan, Ryukyu Islands, South Korea, Japan	Unknown	≥ 50	
A2	September 29 – October 2	Unknown	Not specified	None	None	None	
ARB 03	September 30 – October 1	45 (30)	997	None	None	None	

=== October ===
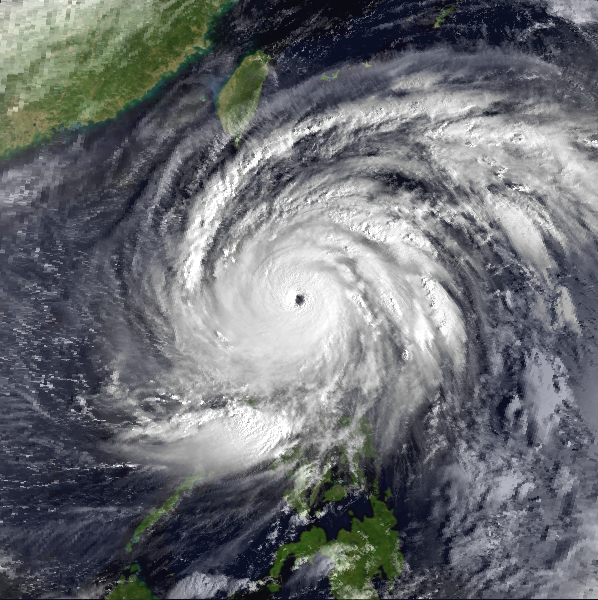
Typhoon Zeb

Tropical cyclones formed in October 1998
Storm name	Dates active	Max wind km/h (mph)	Min pressure (hPa)	Areas affected	Damage (USD)	Deaths	Refs
Twelve-E	October 1–3	55 (35)	1003	None	None	None	
15W	October 2–5	55 (35)	1000	China, Vietnam	None	None	
16W	October 5–7	55 (35)	1010	Taiwan, Ryukyu Islands	None	None	
Lisa	October 5–9	120 (75)	995	None	None	None	
17W	October 6–7	55 (35)	1008	Ryukyu Islands	None	None	
Zelia	October 7–10	75 (45)	990	None	None	None	
ARB 04	October 8–9	55 (35)	998	None	None	None	
Zeb (Iliang)	October 9–18	205 (125)	900	Philippines, Taiwan, Japan	$576 million	126	
ARB 05	October 11–17	65 (40)	996	India	None	None	
Alex	October 11	45 (30)	991	None	None	None	
BOB 03	October 13–14	55 (35)	998	India	None	None	
Kay	October 13–17	120 (75)	987	None	None	None	
Babs (Loleng)	October 14–27	155 (100)	940	Philippines, Taiwan, China, Japan	$203 million	327	
Lester	October 15–26	185 (115)	965	Mexico	Unknown	2	
Madeline	October 16–20	140 (85)	979	Mexico, Baja California Peninsula, Texas	$750 million	32	
Mitch	October 22 – November 5	285 (180)	905	Central America, Yucatán Peninsula, Florida, Jamaica, Ireland, United Kingdom	$6.08 billion	≥ 11,374	
BOB 04	October 28–29	55 (35)	1002	India	None	None	

=== November ===
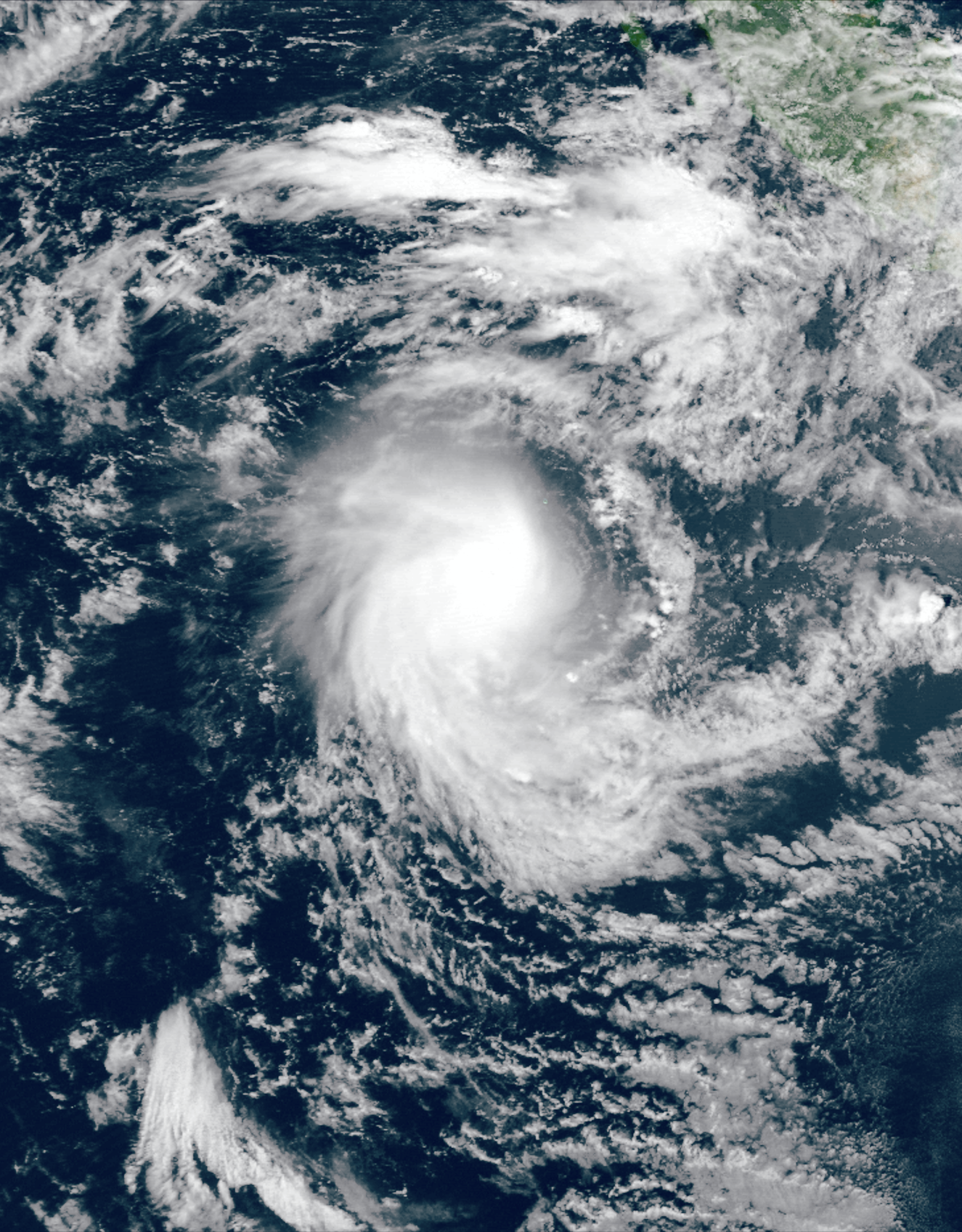
Cyclone Alison

Tropical cyclones formed in November 1998
Storm name	Dates active	Max wind km/h (mph)	Min pressure (hPa)	Areas affected	Damage (USD)	Deaths	Refs
TD	November 4–7	Not specified	1004	None	None	None	
Alison	November 8–13	155 (100)	955	None	None	None	
Chip	November 11–15	75 (45)	994	Vietnam	$923 thousand	17	
BOB 05	November 13–16	145 (90)	982	India	$20.7 million	6	
BOB 06	November 17–23	120 (75)	984	India, Bangladesh	Unknown	100+	
Dawn	November 18–20	65 (40)	998	Vietnam	$28 million	187	
Elvis (Miding)	November 22–26	75 (45)	992	Philippines, Vietnam	$30 million	49	
Nicole	November 24 – December 1	140 (85)	979	None	None	None	

=== December ===
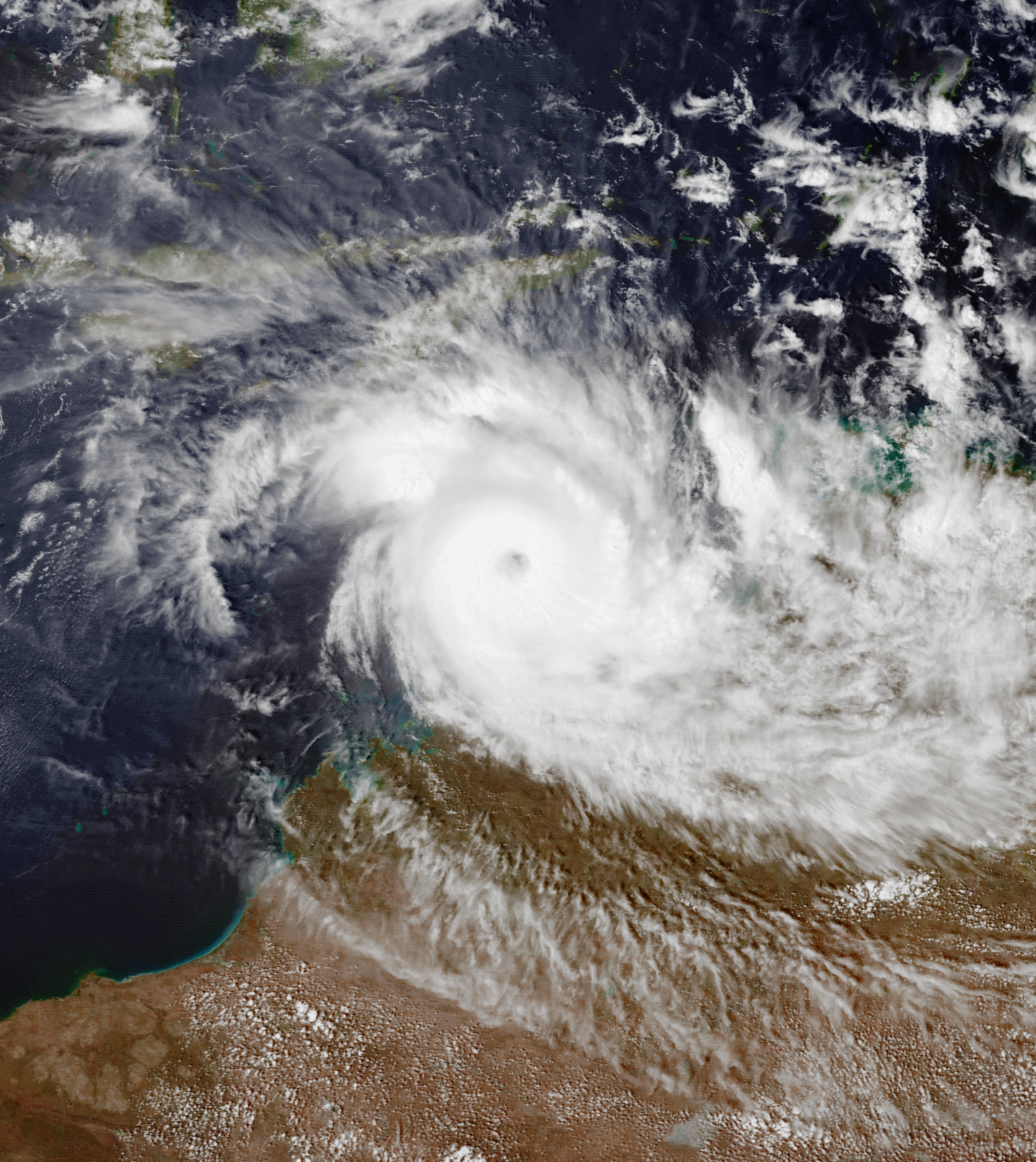
Cyclone Thelma

Tropical cyclones formed in December 1998
Storm name	Dates active	Max wind km/h (mph)	Min pressure (hPa)	Areas affected	Damage (USD)	Deaths	Refs
Billy	December 1–6	130 (80)	965	Western Australia	Unknown	Unknown	
Thelma	December 3–15	220 (140)	920	Northern Territory, Western Australia, Tiwi Islands	Unknown	1	
01F	December 4	Unknown	Not specified	None	None	None	
TL (A3)	December 7–13	45 (30)	1000	None	None	None	
Faith (Norming)	December 8–14	120 (75)	970	Philippines, Vietnam	$45.9 million	63	
Gil	December 9–13	75 (45)	992	Thailand, Vietnam	None	None	
ARB 06	December 13–17	100 (65)	993	Oman	None	18	
07P	December 14–17	75 (45)	999	None	None	None	
Cathy	December 16–30	110 (70)	975	None	None	None	
26W	December 17–19	45 (30)	1002	Philippines	None	None	
27W	December 19–22	55 (35)	1000	None	None	None	
02F	December 22–24	65 (40)	997	None	None	None	
Cora	December 21–28	140 (85)	960	Tonga, Fiji	$12 million	Unknown	
04F	December 25–26	Unknown	Not specified	None	None	None	
TL	December 26 – January 2	55 (35)	996	Queensland, New South Wales	None	1	

== Global effects ==
There are a total of 9 tropical cyclone basins, 7 are seasonal and two are non-seasonal, thus all 8 basins except the Mediterranean are active. In this table, data from all these basins are added.

Season name	Areas affected	Systems formed	Named storms	Damage (USD)	Deaths	
1998 Atlantic hurricane season ^{5}	Southeastern United States, Gulf Coast of the United States, Mid-Atlantic, Atlantic Canada, Midwestern United States, New England, Bermuda, Lesser Antilles, Greater Antilles, Central America, Yucatán Peninsula, Ireland, United Kingdom, Spain, Portugal, Cabo Verde	14	14	$17.079 billion	> 12,010	
1998 Pacific hurricane season ^{5}	Revillagigedo Islands, Mexico, Baja California Peninsula, Western Coast of the United States, Central America, Northwestern United States, Texas, Arizona	16	13	$760 million	54	
1998 Pacific typhoon season ^{3}	Philippines, Taiwan, Ryukyu Islands, China, Mariana Islands, China, Japan, Vietnam, South Korea, Caroline Islands, Cambodia, Laos, Thailand	33	18	$950.8 million	924	
1998 North Indian Ocean cyclone season ^{4}	India, Pakistan, Bangladesh, Sri Lanka	12	6	≥ $3 billion	≥ 10,224	
1997–98 South-West Indian Ocean cyclone season ^{2} ^{6}	Madagascar, Mozambique, Mascarene Islands, Europa Island	13	7	Unknown	88 – 114	
1998–99 South-West Indian Ocean cyclone season	Diego Garcia	3	0	None	None	
1997–98 Australian region cyclone season ^{2}	Western Australia, Northern Territory, Papua New Guinea, Solomon Islands, Queensland	8	6	> $8.13 billion	5	
1998–99 Australian region cyclone season	Tiwi Islands, Cocos Islands, Western Australia, Queensland, New South Wales	7	5	Unknown	2	
1997–98 South Pacific cyclone season ^{2}	None	13	9	> $566,000	> 32	
1998–99 South Pacific cyclone season	Fiji, Tonga	5	1	Unknown	Unknown	
1998 Mediterranean tropical-like cyclone season	Unknown	2	0	Unknown	Unknown	
Worldwide	(See above)	125	73	73	> $29.802 billion	> 23,365

== See also ==
- Tropical cyclones by year
- List of earthquakes in 1998
- Tornadoes of 1998

== Notes ==
^{2} Only systems that formed either on or after January 1, 1998 are counted in the seasonal totals.
^{3} Only systems that formed either before or on December 31, 1998 are counted in the seasonal totals.
^{4} The wind speeds for this tropical cyclone/basin are based on the IMD Scale which uses 3-minute sustained winds.
^{5} The wind speeds for this tropical cyclone/basin are based on the Saffir Simpson Scale which uses 1-minute sustained winds.
^{6}The wind speeds for this tropical cyclone are based on Météo-France which uses wind gusts.
