= Cyclone Zuman =

Category 3 South Pacific cyclone in 1998

Severe Tropical Cyclone Zuman
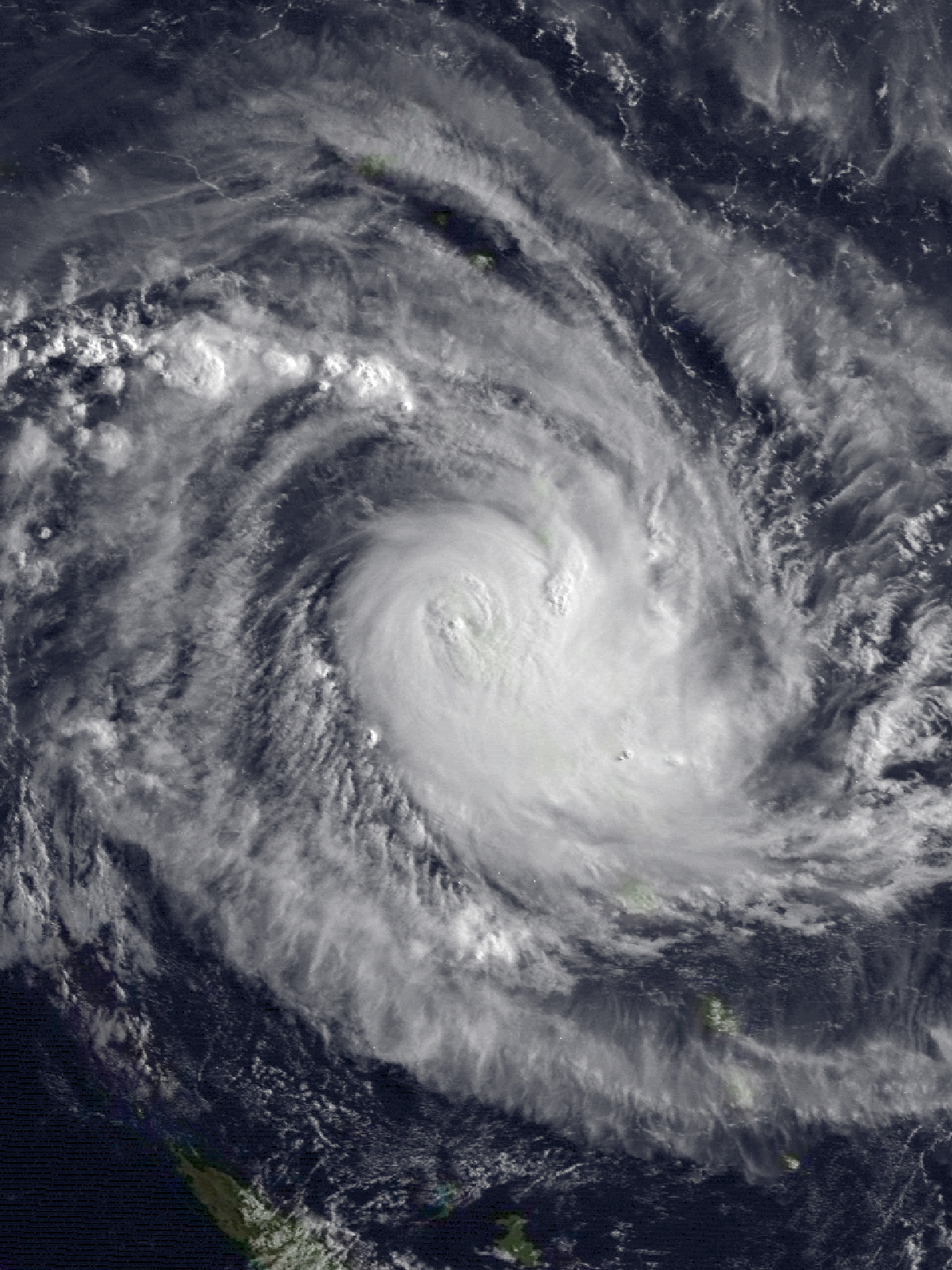
- Severe Tropical Cyclone Zuman over Vanuatu near its peak intensity on 31 March

Meteorological history
- Formed: 29 March 1998
- Dissipated: 5 April 1998

Category 3 severe tropical cyclone
- 10-minute sustained (FMS)
- Highest winds: 150 km/h (90 mph)
- Lowest pressure: 955 hPa (mbar); 28.20 inHg

Category 3-equivalent tropical cyclone
- 1-minute sustained (SSHWS/JTWC)
- Highest winds: 185 km/h (115 mph)

Overall effects
- Fatalities: None
- Damage: $6 million (1998 USD)
- Areas affected: Vanuatu, New Caledonia, New Zealand
- IBTrACS
- Part of the 1997–98 South Pacific cyclone season

Severe Tropical Cyclone Zuman was the fourteenth named storm of the 1997–98 South Pacific cyclone season. It was first noted as a tropical disturbance on 28 March, and it gradually developed further over the next day before being named Zuman on 30 March. Atmospheric convection and an upper-level anticyclone allowed it to develop quickly as it was pulled to the west. It struck the island of Espiritu Santo, Vanuatu on 1 April at peak intensity, causing around $6 million (1998 USD) in damages there. Zuman then began weakening due to wind shear as it paralleled the coast of New Caledonia, where it transitioned to a non-tropical system. Its remnants caused heavy rain in New Zealand as it passed by on 10 April.

== Meteorological history ==
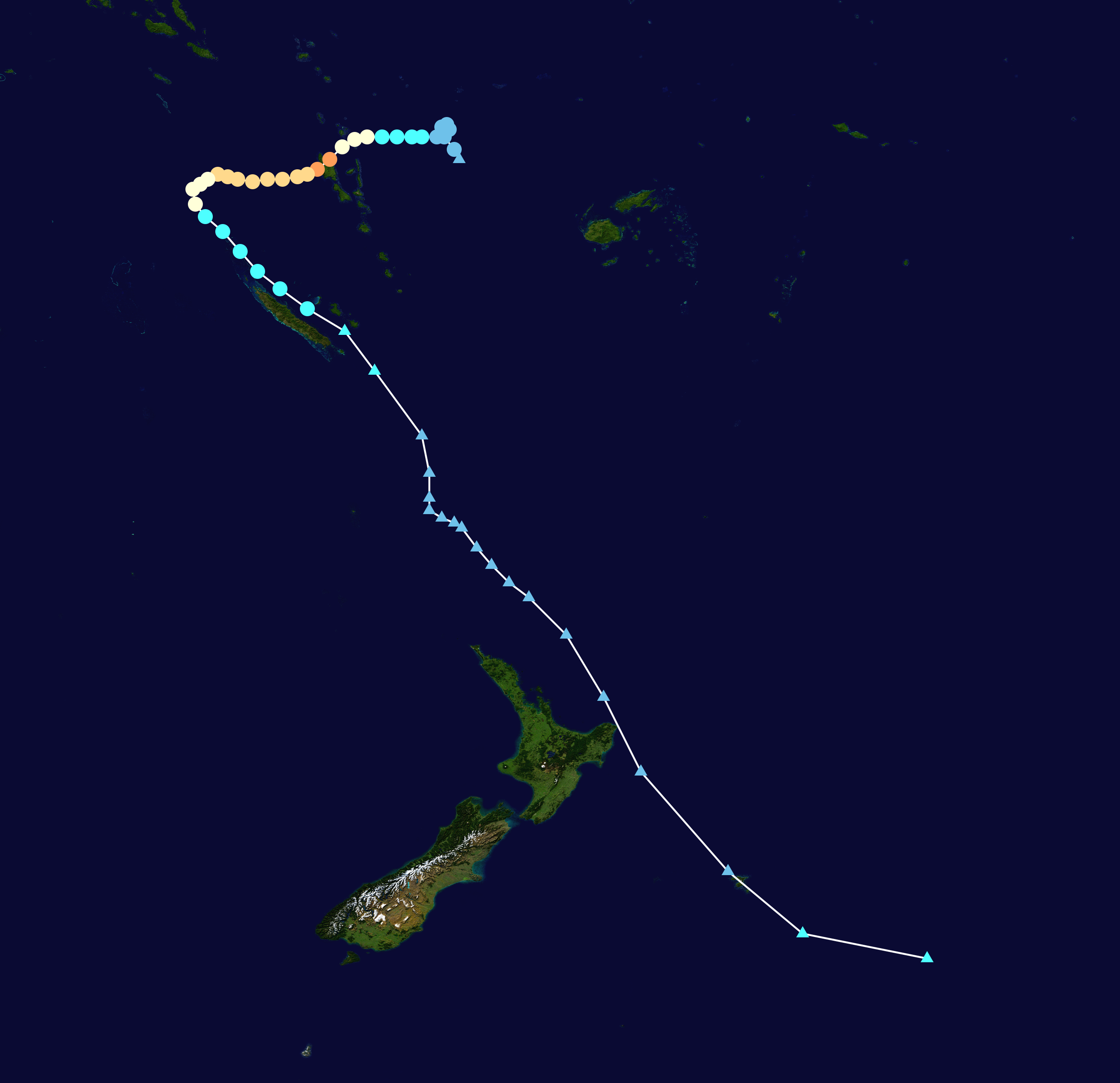
Map plotting the storm's track and intensity, according to the Saffir–Simpson scale Map key Saffir–Simpson scale Tropical depression (≤38 mph, ≤62 km/h) Tropical storm (39–73 mph, 63–118 km/h) Category 1 (74–95 mph, 119–153 km/h) Category 2 (96–110 mph, 154–177 km/h) Category 3 (111–129 mph, 178–208 km/h) Category 4 (130–156 mph, 209–251 km/h) Category 5 (≥157 mph, ≥252 km/h) Unknown Storm type Tropical cyclone Subtropical cyclone Extratropical cyclone, remnant low, tropical disturbance, or monsoon depression

On 28 March, the United States Joint Typhoon Warning Center started to monitor a tropical disturbance that had developed about 520 km (325 mi) to the northeast of Port Vila, Vanuatu. Over the next day, an anticyclone developed over the system as it moved northwestward while atmospheric convection persisted over the system, becoming better organized. The Fiji Meteorological Service classified the system as a tropical depression the same day. After the system had continued to significantly develop in an area of warm sea surface temperatures and weakening vertical wind shear, the JTWC initiated advisories and designated the system as Tropical Cyclone 31P at around 09:00 UTC on 29 March. It was later named Zuman by the FMS after it had become a Category 1 tropical cyclone on the Australian tropical cyclone intensity scale. The same day, the system was slowly steered westward toward Vanuatu by an upper level ridge of high pressure located to the south of the system. Atmospheric convection had also started to develop over the system's low level circulation center, while an upper-level anticyclone had developed over the disturbance. The system subsequently continued to develop throughout the next day.

Zuman struck the island of Espiritu Santo, Vanuatu with winds of 90 mph (145 km/h). It maintained this intensity through the first few days of April. On 3 April, Zuman reached its peak central pressure of 955 mbar as it began drifting to the south and later the southeast. It began slowly weakening due to the effects of wind shear whilst staying near to the eastern coast of New Caledonia on 5 April, where it degenerated into a remnant. On 7 April, Zuman's remnants induced a new low along a cloud band to the east of Norfolk Island, which MetService tracked as an extension of Zuman. This low went on to produce several short bursts of rain including around 30 millimetres (1.2 in) at Gisborne Airport as it passed near New Zealand's East Cape, before it was last noted to the east of New Zealand's South Island on 10 April.

== Effects ==
Zuman impacted parts of the Solomon Islands, Vanuatu, New Caledonia and New Zealand less than two weeks after Cyclone Yali had impacted those same areas. While there was no damage reported in New Zealand, Vanuatu incurred over $6 million (1998 USD) in damages.

The system affected the northern and central islands of Vanuatu during March and April 1998, becoming the fourth tropical cyclone of the season to affect the island nation after Severe Tropical Cyclones Susan, Katrina and Yali. It was already suffering from the impacts of a drought, which had been caused by a lack of rainfall from the 1997–98 El Niño event. By 31 March, various alerts and warnings were issued by the Vanuatu National Disaster Management Office for Santa Cruz Islands, Solomon Islands and the Northern Vanuatu islands, including red, yellow and blue alerts, gale force and strong wind warnings. Residents were warned that the system posed a high risk of flooding in low-lying coastal and river areas as a result of Zuman coinciding with very high tides. As a result, people were urged to leave their homes by the NDMO, while three evacuation centers were set up by local authorities. All schools were subsequently closed, and ships were ordered to seek safe refuge. On 1 April, the system brought heavy rain and destructive winds to Northern and Central Vanuatu, making landfall on Espiritu Santo around a week after Yali had affected Southern Vanuatu. Extensive damage was subsequently reported to fruit trees and crops in Northern Vanuatu, with northeastern and eastern Espiritu Santo being the worst affected. On Espiritu Santo, severe flooding was reported on the east coast, with the towns of Luganville and Port Olry being badly affected by the cyclone. In Hog Harbour, Vanuatu, all semi-permanent houses were partially or completely destroyed. Coconut plantations on the island were damaged, which caused serious effects to the island's major industry of copra.

International assistance was requested after the Vanuatu Government realized that it could not cope with the aftermath of both cyclones and the ongoing drought using its own resources, with the main need being financial support in order to purchase and distribute relief items. The government also needed the means to reach the inaccessible island hinterlands and to conduct damage assessments. As a result, the Vanuatu Government asked the French Government to support the National Disaster Management Office in an aerial survey in order to identify the damage and the worst affected areas. This request was subsequently granted with a French military jet sent to assess the damage from New Caledonia on 4 April. The plane confirmed preliminary reports of heavy damage from the system, though it saw no significant damage in Vanuatu's Banks Islands. The United Nations Office for the Coordination of Humanitarian Affairs released $15,000 from the Norwegian reserve fund for natural disasters, while it also allocated a grant of $15,000 for the local procurement and transportation of relief.

== See also ==
- Tropical cyclones in 1998
- 1997–98 South Pacific cyclone season
