= Port Olry =

Port Olry Saint Anne
- Village
- Location in Vanuatu
- Coordinates: 15°02′58″S 167°03′04″E
- Country: Vanuatu
- Province: Sanma Province
- Island: Espiritu Santo

Population (2009)
  - Total: 1,300
- Time zone: UTC+11 (VUT)

Port Olry is a small Francophone fishing village on the island of Espiritu Santo in the Sanma Province of Vanuatu. As of 2009, it had an estimated population of 1,300. Known for its white sand beaches and clear shallow waters, the village is at the end of the East Coast Road connecting it to the town of Luganville. There are three offshore islands which can be reached from Port Olry via kayak or outrigger canoe, which are popular for reef snorkelling.

With a large Catholic population, Port Olry is home to a Catholic mission. In 1998, Port Olry was hit hard by Tropical Cyclone Zuman, but it has since recovered, and living standards and amenities have noticeably improved in the village.

== Economy ==
The local economy is heavily dependent on fishing, a traditional male role, while many females find work gardening. Port Olry produces octopus, beef, copra, and cocoa. The economy is male-centric, women are usually not given a say in typical daily business deals, and rely on their husbands.

Port Olry's standard of living has improved since 2009, and citizens now enjoy electricity, tar-sealed roads, improved healthcare (a renovated health centre with new facilities), commercial bank access (NBV - Vanuatu's own bank branch), a new post office branch, a renovation for its secondary school, new restaurants, bungalows along the beach, and more retail shops.

Transportation to Luganville, the largest town in the area, is usually done by taxi and bus. However, locals often hitchhike on trucks travelling to the town, typically loaded with bags of copra and other market products.

== Education ==
Education in the village follows the French system. Parents usually send their children to the village schools, Saint Anne Primary and Saint Anne Secondary. Children who perform well in their Year 6 examinations can pursue their secondary studies in Saint Anne's branch, or choose to attend other schools around Luganville, Sanma Province, and even schools in other parts of the country. A lot of Port Olry children earn higher education qualifications (Year 14 certificates, Year 13, 12, 10), and a few earn bachelor's degrees from the University of the South Pacific, with campuses in Suva, Fiji, and Port Vila, Vanuatu's capital.

== Cyclone Zuman ==
In 1998, Tropical Cyclone Zuman hit Vanuatu. On Espiritu Santo Island, over 100 buildings were destroyed or damaged, and an estimated 60-70% of crops were destroyed. Port Orly was hit hard, with 95% of buildings and gardens reporting some sort of damage. As part of the relief effort, the town was donated 50 tarpaulins to provide shelter for those affected by the disaster.
