= List of storms named Thelma =

The name Thelma has been used for fourteen tropical cyclones worldwide: thirteen in the northwest Pacific Ocean and one in the Australian region.

In the Western Pacific:

- Typhoon Thelma (1951) (T5117)
- Typhoon Thelma (1956) (T5603) – struck Japan. (ja)
- Tropical Depression Thelma (1959) (36W, Japan Meteorological Agency analyzed it as a tropical depression, not as a tropical storm.)
- Typhoon Thelma (1962) (T6214, 58W) – struck Japan.
- Tropical Storm Thelma (1965) (04W, Kuring, Japan Meteorological Agency analyzed it as a tropical depression, not as a tropical storm.)
- Tropical Storm Thelma (1967) (T6725, 29W)
- Tropical Storm Thelma (1971) (T7102, 02W)
- Tropical Storm Thelma (1973) (T7320, 22W)
- Typhoon Thelma (1977) (T7704, 06W, Goring) – a moderately strong typhoon that impacted the Philippines, Taiwan and Mainland China
- Tropical Storm Thelma (1980) (T8017, 21W)
- Tropical Storm Thelma (1983) (T8323, 24W, Krising)
- Typhoon Thelma (1987) (T8705, 05W, Katring)
- Tropical Storm Thelma (1991) (T9125, 27W, Uring) – a relatively weak system which caused major damage in the Philippines and Vietnam; became the deadliest modern-day Philippine tropical cyclone until Typhoon Haiyan 22 years later.

The name Thelma was retired after the 1991 season, and was replaced by Teresa.

In the Australian region:

- Cyclone Thelma (1998) – an intense tropical cyclone which threatened Darwin but ultimately caused less damage than expected.

Following the storm, the name Thelma was also retired in the Australian region, and was replaced by Tasha.
