= Cyclone Thelma =

Tropical cyclone in Australia in 1998

Severe Tropical Cyclone Thelma
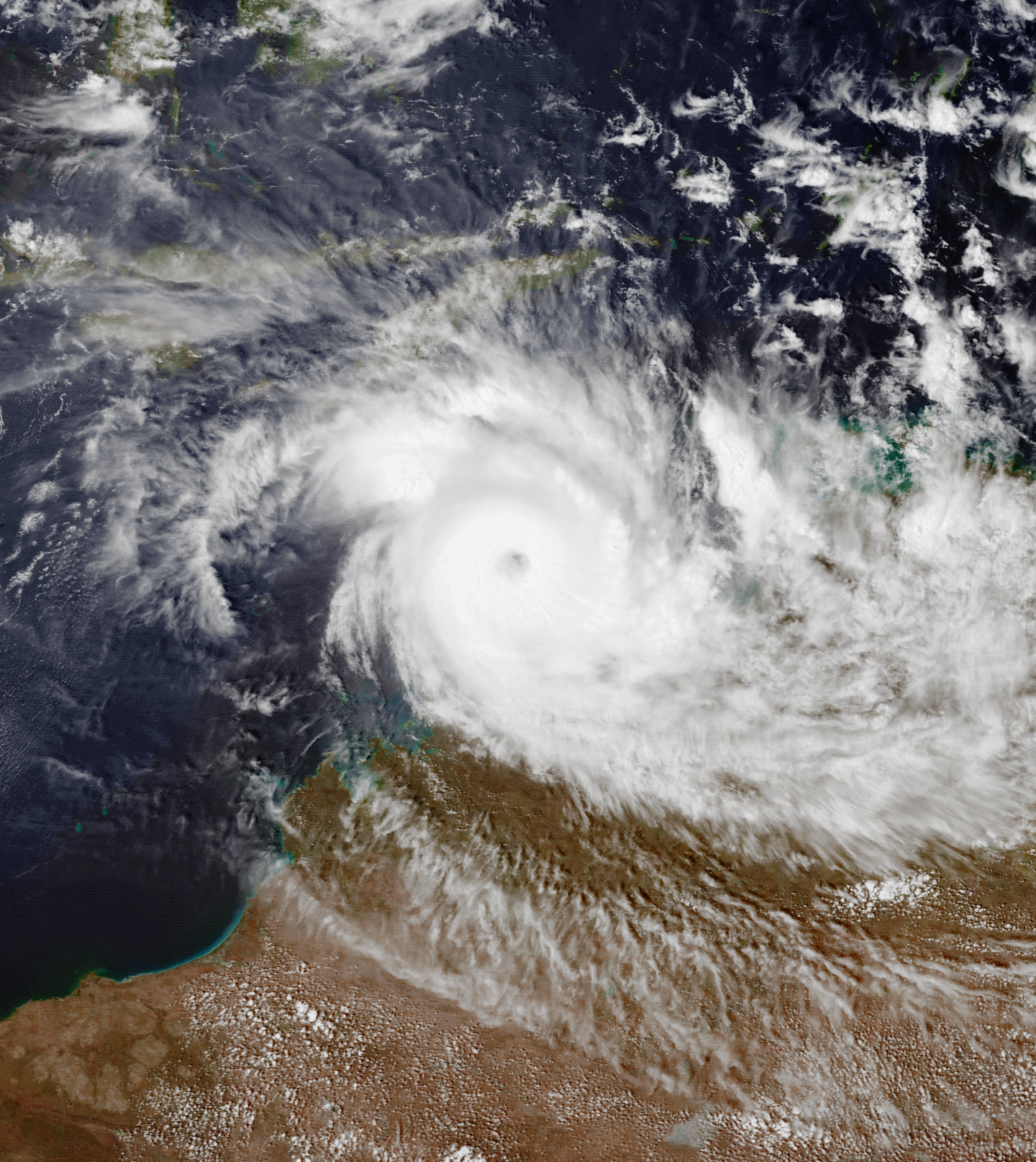
- Cyclone Thelma near peak intensity

Meteorological history
- Formed: 3 December 1998
- Dissipated: 15 December 1998

Category 5 severe tropical cyclone
- 10-minute sustained (Aus)
- Highest winds: 220 km/h (140 mph)
- Lowest pressure: 920 hPa (mbar); 27.17 inHg

Category 4-equivalent tropical cyclone
- 1-minute sustained (SSHWS/JTWC)
- Highest winds: 250 km/h (155 mph)
- Lowest pressure: 904 hPa (mbar); 26.70 inHg

Overall effects
- Fatalities: 1 direct
- Areas affected: Northern Territory, Western Australia
- IBTrACS
- Part of the 1998–99 Australian region cyclone season

Severe Tropical Cyclone Thelma was a tropical cyclone that affected northern Australia from 6 December 1998 until 12 December 1998. Cyclone Thelma was one of the most intense tropical cyclones to be observed off the coast of Australia. Thelma formed in the Arafura Sea north of the Northern Territory while intensifying rapidly into a Category 5 cyclone, passing very near the Tiwi Islands and posing a severe threat to Darwin, but passed by at a distance of 200 km (120 mi). It then moved across the Timor Sea before hitting the north Kimberley coast. Thelma was the first known Category 5 cyclone to be observed in the Timor Sea, and was also the most intense cyclone to threaten Darwin since Cyclone Tracy on Christmas Eve in 1974. Ten months after the storm's passage, the skull of an 81-year-old man, who was believed to have been swept away by flood waters, was discovered.

== Meteorological history ==
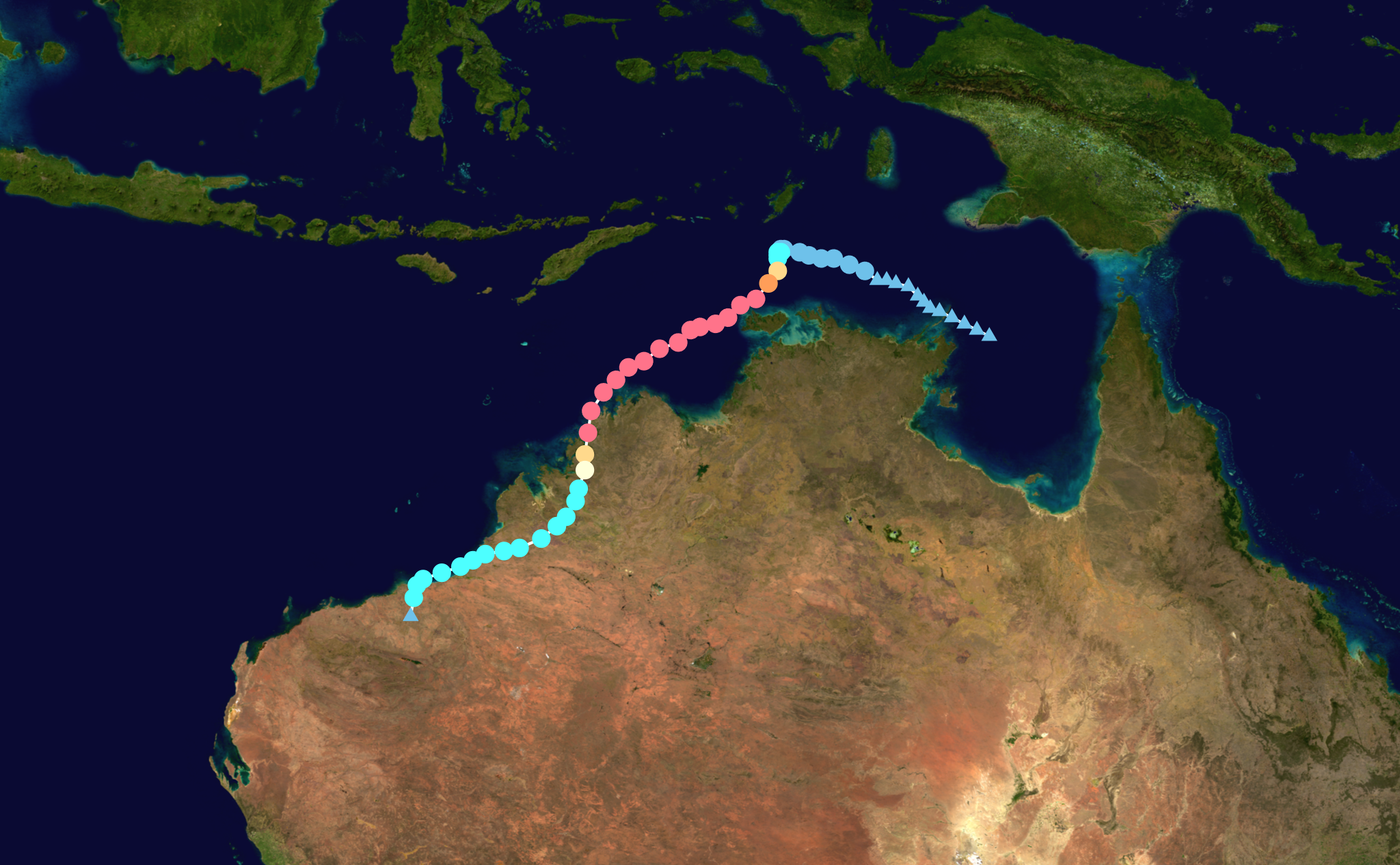
Map plotting the storm's track and intensity, according to the Saffir–Simpson scale Map key Saffir–Simpson scale Tropical depression (≤38 mph, ≤62 km/h) Tropical storm (39–73 mph, 63–118 km/h) Category 1 (74–95 mph, 119–153 km/h) Category 2 (96–110 mph, 154–177 km/h) Category 3 (111–129 mph, 178–208 km/h) Category 4 (130–156 mph, 209–251 km/h) Category 5 (≥157 mph, ≥252 km/h) Unknown Storm type Tropical cyclone Subtropical cyclone Extratropical cyclone, remnant low, tropical disturbance, or monsoon depression

A developing low in the Timor Sea in early December was named Thelma at 2 p.m. Australian Central Standard Time (0430 UTC) on 6 December, located about 350 km (220 mi) north of Darwin. The new cyclone drifted slowly south while rapidly intensifying. Thelma's intensity increased from a Category 2 to a Category 4 during 7 December. Thelma turned towards the southwest and reached Category 5 intensity on the Australian scale just north of Bathurst Island at about 9 a.m. CST on 8 December (2330 UTC 7 December). The cyclone attained a minimum central pressure of 920 hPa, and maximum wind gusts of 320 km/h (200 mph) at 8 p.m. CST (1030 UTC) on the 8 December, only two days after being named. Cyclone Thelma's rate of intensification was close to twice the average rate of most cyclones.

Thelma continued moving steadily southwest at about 10 km/h (6.2 mph) before turning southwards, passing about 50 km (31 mi) from Troughton Island. The cyclone weakened to a Category 3 while crossing the Kimberley coast northwest of Kuri Bay early on 11 December. The cyclone weakened rapidly while over land. Thelma was downgraded below cyclone strength late on 11 December while moving in a more southerly track. The ex-cyclone moved through the west Kimberley and Pilbara on 12 December and 13 December. On the morning of 14 December, the low crossed the Pilbara coast north of Wallal, 240 km (150 mi) east northeast of Port Hedland. It then moved southward through Pilbara and dissipated.

== Preparations ==
All residents of major communities, including Darwin, and offshore installations directly affected by the cyclone were either evacuated or were sheltered in secure accommodation. The port of Darwin was closed during the cyclone, schools were closed for one day and public cyclone shelters were opened on the night of 8 December for people who felt insecure in their place of residence. Emergency officials evacuated about 120 people in the tiny community of Kalumburu, but about 180 people were left behind. Most of those sheltered in an old monastery which had 60 cm (24 in) thick stone walls.

== Impact ==
Overall, the damage caused by Cyclone Thelma was relatively light, compared with the cyclone's severe intensity. However, Thelma still had a significant impact on people's activities near the Tiwi Islands and the Kimberley coast.

In the Tiwi Islands, the most significant impact was disruption to communications and power supplies. The telephone service throughout the Tiwi Islands was shut down for over 24 hours. The radio and television reception was interrupted by heavy rain and lightning, and the power supply in Pirlangimpi (Garden Point) was cut by fallen trees. Around Bathurst Island and northwest Melville Island, there was extensive damage to vegetation in exposed areas. Minor coastal erosion occurred in Milikapiti, where waves rose up to 4 metres (13 feet) above water level. In Pirlangimpi, many large trees were uprooted and several houses were slightly damaged. In Nguiu, Bathurst Island Township, some trees were blown down but there was no significant damage.

In Darwin, there was minor damage to houses and minor disruption to power supplies, caused by falling trees. A record 425 mm (16.7 in) of rain was recorded within 24 hours at Howard Springs, and a 48-hour total of 432 mm (17.0 in) was recorded at Darwin Airport from 8 December to 10 December. The rain caused local flooding in the rural areas around Darwin, blocking off some areas.

In the Kimberley region, there was minor damage to some buildings at Kalumburu and water level in the river rose to within 50 metres (160 feet) of the town. The BHP facilities at Troughton Island were affected by very destructive winds and heavy rainfall from the cyclone's core, damaging the runway and buildings. Average wind speeds of 139 km/h (86 mph) and a maximum gust of 174 km/h (108 mph) were recorded before communications were lost. Only minor damage was received at the pearling facilities at Vansittart Bay and Kuri Bay, mainly to floating pontoons. A number of places reported daily rainfall totals in excess of 100 mm (3.9 in) including 223 mm (8.8 in) in Kalumburu on 11 December, and 174 mm (6.9 in) in Ellendake on 13 December. McGowan Island, to the north of Kalumburu received 490 mm (19 in) of rain between 9 December and 13 December. Parts of east Pilbara also reported heavy rains over several days. Marble Bar recorded 239 mm (9.4 in) and Newman recorded 175 mm (6.9 in) in a two-day period.

=== Retirement ===
The name Thelma was removed from the official list of tropical cyclone names set out by the Tropical Cyclone Warning Centre in Darwin. It was replaced with the name Tasha, which was used for the first and only time in 2010.

== See also ==
- Other storms of the same name
- List of retired Australian region cyclone names
