= Cyclone Yali =

Category 3 South Pacific cyclone in 1998

Severe Tropical Cyclone Yali
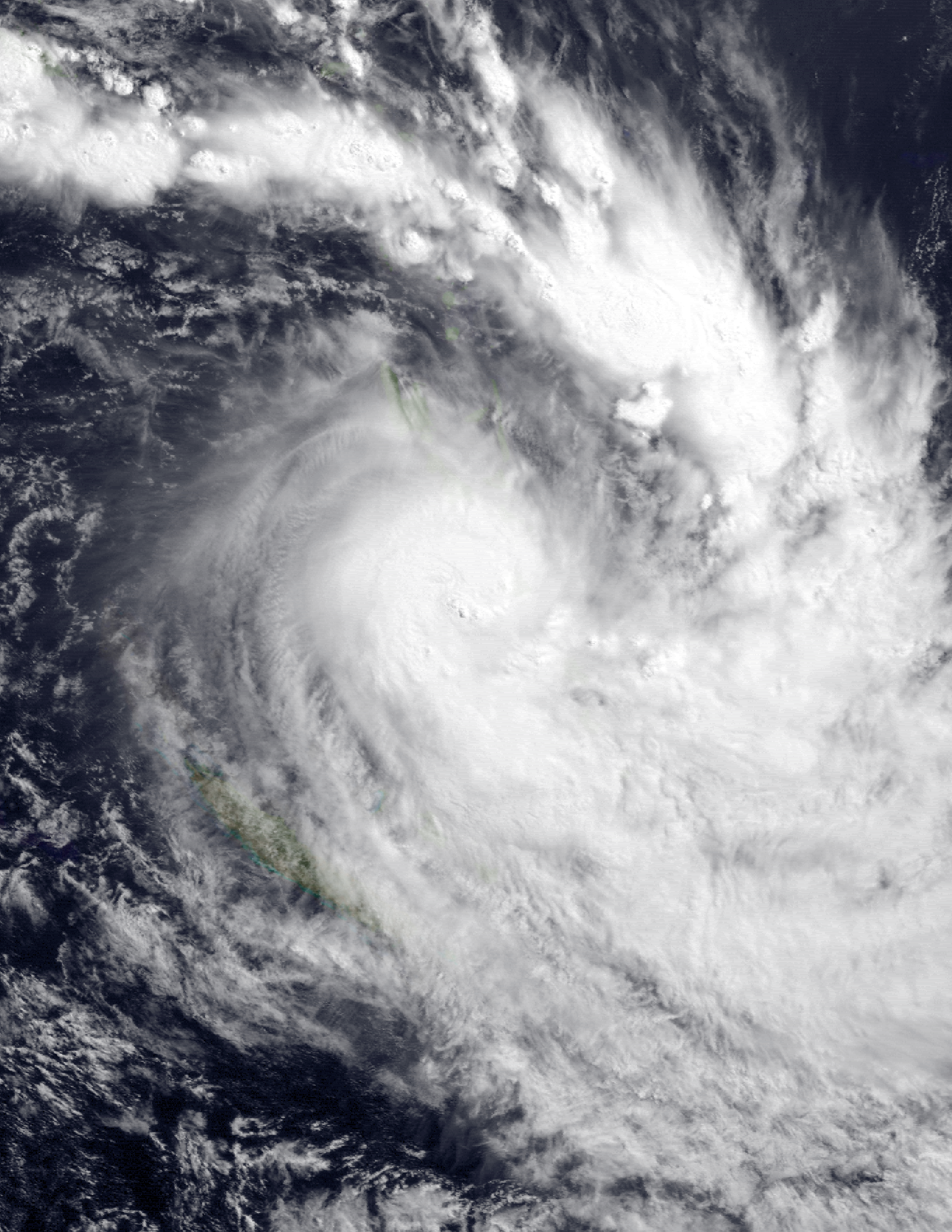
- Yali near peak intensity on 21 March

Meteorological history
- Formed: 17 March 1998
- Extratropical: 27 March 1998
- Dissipated: 1 April 1998

Category 3 severe tropical cyclone
- 10-minute sustained (FMS)
- Highest winds: 130 km/h (80 mph)
- Lowest pressure: 965 hPa (mbar); 28.50 inHg

Category 2-equivalent tropical cyclone
- 1-minute sustained (SSHWS/JTWC)
- Highest winds: 165 km/h (105 mph)

Overall effects
- Fatalities: 1
- Areas affected: Solomon Islands, Vanuatu, New Caledonia, New Zealand, Antarctica
- IBTrACS
- Part of the 1997–98 South Pacific and the Australian region cyclone season

Severe Tropical Cyclone Yali was one of seven severe tropical cyclones to develop during the 1997–98 South Pacific cyclone season. The system that was to become Yali was first noted as a tropical disturbance, to the northeast of Vanuatu during 17 March. Over the next couple of days, the system moved towards the south-west and gradually developed further, before it was named Yali during 19 March, after it had developed into a tropical cyclone. After it was named Yali re-curved and started moving towards the south-southeast, as the monsoonal flow to the north of the system strengthened. While the system was active, Yali affected Vanuatu and New Caledonia before the extra-tropical remnants impacted New Zealand where a man was killed and widespread power outages and damage were reported.

== Meteorological history ==
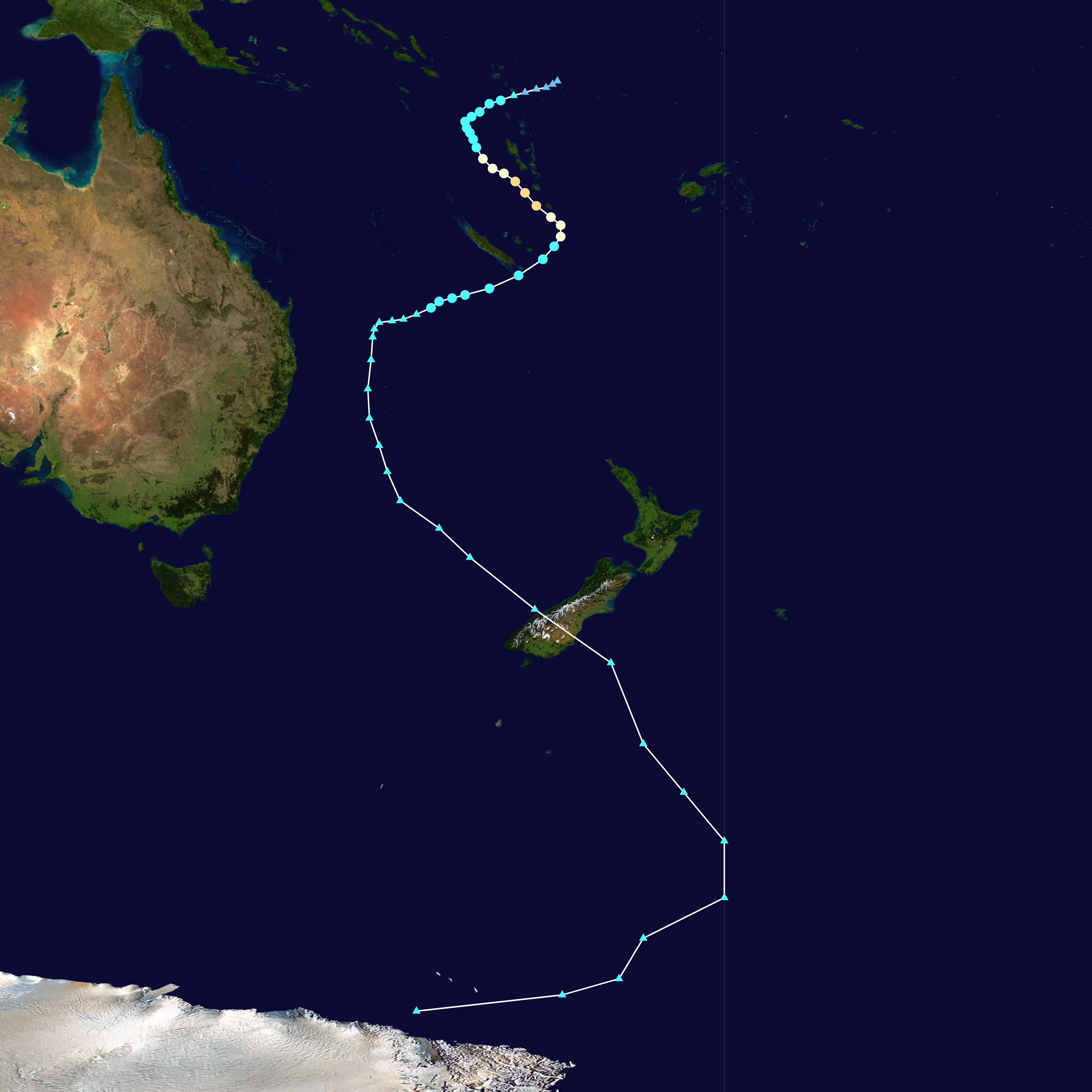
Map plotting the storm's track and intensity, according to the Saffir–Simpson scale Map key Saffir–Simpson scale Tropical depression (≤38 mph, ≤62 km/h) Tropical storm (39–73 mph, 63–118 km/h) Category 1 (74–95 mph, 119–153 km/h) Category 2 (96–110 mph, 154–177 km/h) Category 3 (111–129 mph, 178–208 km/h) Category 4 (130–156 mph, 209–251 km/h) Category 5 (≥157 mph, ≥252 km/h) Unknown Storm type Tropical cyclone Subtropical cyclone Extratropical cyclone, remnant low, tropical disturbance, or monsoon depression

During 17 March, the United States Joint Typhoon Warning Center issued a tropical cyclone formation alert on a tropical disturbance, that had developed about 700 km (435 mi) to the northeast of Port Vila in Vanuatu. The disturbance was slowly moving south-southwestwards, along the steering flow of a weak mid-level ridge of high pressure in between Vanuatu and the Solomon Islands. Over the following day, the Fiji Meteorological Service started to monitor the disturbance, as a well defined area of low pressure, while the JTWC subsequently initiated advisories and designated the system as Tropical Cyclone 29P. During 19 March, the system continued to develop in an area of low vertical wind shear and warm sea surface temperatures, before the FMS named it Yali after it had developed into a Category 1 tropical cyclone on the Australian tropical cyclone intensity scale. The newly named tropical cyclone subsequently started to move south-eastwards, as the monsoonal steering flow to the north of the system increased.

After passing west of Vanuatu, this storm gradually intensified; by 21 March, the JTWC reported that Yali had intensified into a Category 1 hurricane.

During 22 March, the JTWC reported that Yali had peaked with 1-minute sustained wind speeds of 165 km/h (105 mph), which made it equivalent to a category 2 hurricane on the Saffir-Simpson hurricane wind scale. Later that day, the FMS followed suit and reported that Yali had peaked with 10-minute sustained wind speeds of 130 km/h (80 mph), which made it a Category 3 severe tropical cyclone.

During that day Yali passed about 100 km (60 mi) to the west of the capital city of Vanuatu: Port Vila, before passing over the Vanuatuan islands of Tanna and Aneityum.

Shortly after its peak, thunderstorm activity began to decrease, and Yali started weakening. On 22 March, the JTWC noted that winds had subsided to tropical storm status while winds soon dropped below Category 2 intensity. At around the same time, a mid-level subtropical ridge began to influence its motion, sending it to the west. As Yali moved to the southwest, the wind field became asymmetric. Based on Nadi data, by 23 March, Yali was just east of Nouméa, New Caledonia with winds of 50 mph (80 km/h). After passing south of New Caledonia, an upper-level low picked up the cyclone and induced cold air into the atmospheric circulation.

Early on 25 March, Yali had lost its tropical characteristics as an upper-level low captured the system, with cold air working around the northern and western sides of the circulation. However, the JTWC continued to monitor Yali as a tropical cyclone, while the system moved across 160°E and into the Australian region, where they were monitored by the Australian Bureau of Meteorology as an extratropical cyclone.

By the next day, Yali's center was less than 300 mi (480 km) east-northeast of Brisbane, Australia. Despite a brief revival of convection, on the morning of 27 March, the JTWC released its final bulletin on Yali. At this time, the low was located around 300 mi (480 km) east-southeast of Brisbane. The remnants of Yali went under a transformation in the Tasman Sea and respectively deepened south of New Zealand.

The extratropical remnants of Yali were last noted by TCWC Wellington during 31 March, while they were located about 3,350 km (2,080 mi) to the southeast of Wellington, New Zealand. The remnants were subsequently absorbed into the circumpolar trough.

== Preparations, impact, and aftermath ==
=== Vanuatu ===
While Yali passed west of the Vanuatu Islands, it came close enough to affect the isles of Tanna and Aneityum. Tanna saw about 60–70% of its crops destroyed and about 30% of its homes damaged by the storm. In Banana, vegetables and manioc crops, as well as fruit trees were entirely destroyed. In the atoll island of Aniwa, minor damage to houses and agriculture has been reported. Other places in Vanuatu only received minor damage, though Yali caused heavy rainfall and flooding throughout the island group and affected residents in low-lying areas and close to river banks. Throughout the county, some damage was recorded to local buildings and banana plantations were destroyed. During the aftermath of the storm, several evacuation centers were opened on the mainland to victims who had left their homes during the storm. The Government of Vanuatu sought support from the local Red Cross and other relief groups. At peak intensity, Yali brushed Port Vila with 15 mph (24 km/h) winds (perhaps due to poor exposure of the instrument) and a peak pressure of 992 mbar (29.3 inHg).

=== New Caledonia ===
Cyclone Yali passed just to the south of New Caledonia during 23 March and affected the Loyalty Islands, Isle of Pines and the southern half of Grande Terre. On the Isle of Pines a rainfall total of 137 mm (5.4 in) and a peak wind gust of 126 km/h (78 mph) were recorded. Other peak wind gusts of 162 km/h (101 mph) and 101 km/h (63 mph) were recorded in Cape N'Dua and La Roche. Some damage was reported to Mare, Yate and the Isle of Pines with torn roofs and uprooted trees.

=== New Zealand ===
Upon striking New Zealand as an extratropical storm, it caused high seas and flooding over parts of the South Island, notably around Westport and Nelson. One fatality occurred when a youth was swept away into the ocean in New Plymouth. Trees were toppled, roofs were ripped off and power lines fell. In addition, another person had to be rescued in Waikato. Because of high winds, trees were downed, trucks were blown across roads, and buildings were left without roofs. Yali also caused air travel difficulties in Wellington, where a car was hit by a flying billboard. Tararuas recorded rainfall totals exceeding 4 in (100 mm). In addition, trees blown over by gales closed a major route between Nelson and Picton. High winds blew a roof in Hataitai. In Paraparaumu and Waikanae, a sudden period of heavy rain led to flooded basements. Due to a combination of rough seas and a high tide, a bay was flooded. Many inland roads became difficult to drive on and widespread power outages were reported. In all, only minor flooding was reported; the primary threat of Yali was high winds, not heavy rain. Due to the storm's rapid motion, the bulk of the rainfall fell within 12 hours.

== See also ==
- Cyclone Les (1998)
