= List of storms named Peter =

The name Peter has been used for four tropical cyclones worldwide: two in the Atlantic Ocean, one in the West Pacific Ocean, and one in the Australian region.

In the Atlantic:

- Tropical Storm Peter (2003) – did not affect land.
- Tropical Storm Peter (2021) – affected multiple areas in the Caribbean.

In the West Pacific:

- Typhoon Peter (1997; T9708, 09W, Daling) – a Category 1-equivalent typhoon that affected Japan.

In the Australian region:

- Cyclone Peter (1979) – the wettest tropical cyclone on record in Australia until Cyclone Jasper in 2023.

== See also ==
Storms with similar names

- Storm Johannes (2025) – a European windstorm that was named Peda by the Free University of Berlin.
- List of storms named Pedro – various storms named the Spanish equivalent of Peter.
- Cyclone Per (2007) – a European windstorm that left 300,000 households without electricity in Sweden. Named the Swedish equivalent of Peter.
- Cyclone Pete (1999) – a Category 2 Australian region tropical cyclone that crossed into the South Pacific.
- Cyclone Pita (2025) – a Category 1 South Pacific tropical cyclone.
