= List of storms named Pedro =

The name Pedro has been used for one tropical cyclone in the Australian region and one European windstorm.

In the Australian region:

- Cyclone Pedro (1989) – a Category 2 tropical cyclone that caused flooding in Cocos Island.

In Europe:

- Storm Pedro (2026) – also known as Cyclone Yael; caused widespread flooding and severe impacts in several European countries.
