= Typhoon Imbudo =

Pacific typhoon in 2003

Typhoon Imbudo (Harurot)
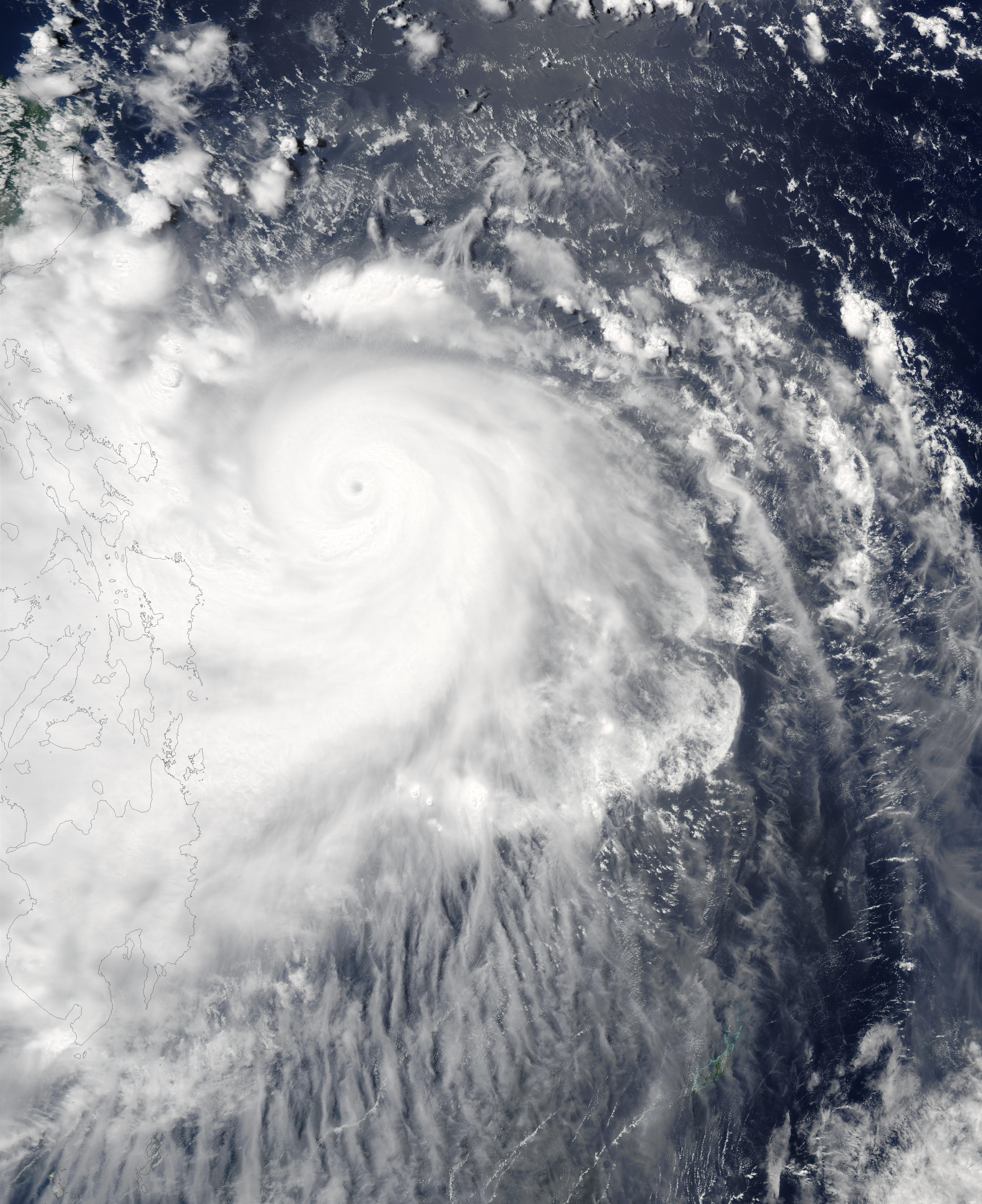
- Imbudo approaching the Philippines near peak intensity on July 21

Meteorological history
- Formed: July 15, 2003
- Dissipated: July 25, 2003

Very strong typhoon
- 10-minute sustained (JMA)
- Highest winds: 165 km/h (105 mph)
- Lowest pressure: 935 hPa (mbar); 27.61 inHg

Category 4-equivalent super typhoon
- 1-minute sustained (SSHWS/JTWC)
- Highest winds: 240 km/h (150 mph)
- Lowest pressure: 910 hPa (mbar); 26.87 inHg

Overall effects
- Fatalities: 85
- Damage: $383 million (2003 USD)
- Areas affected: Philippines, China
- IBTrACS
- Part of the 2003 Pacific typhoon season

Typhoon Imbudo, (Note: The name Imbudo (Tagalog: imbudo, [ʔɪmˈbuː.do]) was contributed by the Philippines and means funnel in Tagalog.) known in the Philippines as Typhoon Harurot, (Note: The name derives from a local term for swoosh or faster approach.) was a powerful typhoon that struck the Philippines and southern China in mid July 2003. The seventh named storm and fourth typhoon of the season, Imbudo formed on July 15 to the east of the Philippines. The storm moved generally west-northward for much of its duration due to a ridge to the north. Favorable conditions allowed Imbudo to intensify, gradually at first before undergoing rapid deepening on July 19. After reaching typhoon status, Imbudo strengthened further to peak 10–minute sustained winds of 165 km/h (103 mph) on July 20. The typhoon made landfall on northern Luzon near peak intensity on July 22, but quickly weakened over land. Once in the South China Sea, Imbudo re-intensified slightly before making its final landfall in southern China near Yangjiang on July 24, dissipating the next day.

In the Philippines, Imbudo was the strongest typhoon in five years, causing widespread flooding and power outages in the Cagayan Valley for weeks. Damage was heaviest in Isabela province near where the storm struck. Most of the banana crop was destroyed, and other crops sustained similar but lesser damage. Imbudo disrupted transportation across much of Luzon. Nationwide, the storm damaged or destroyed 62,314 houses, causing P4.7 billion (PHP, $86 million USD) in damage, mostly in the Cagayan Valley. (Note: All damage totals are in 2003 values of their respective currencies.) There were also 64 deaths in the country. In Hong Kong, strong winds killed a man after knocking him off a platform. In China, damage was heaviest in Guangdong where the storm struck. Thousands of trees fell, and 595,000 houses were wrecked. Hundreds of canceled flights stranded travelers across the region. In Guangxi, high rainfall increased water levels in 45 reservoirs to warning levels. In Guangxi and Guangdong, collectively 20 people were killed, and damage reached about ¥4.45 billion (CNY, US$297 million).

== Meteorological history ==
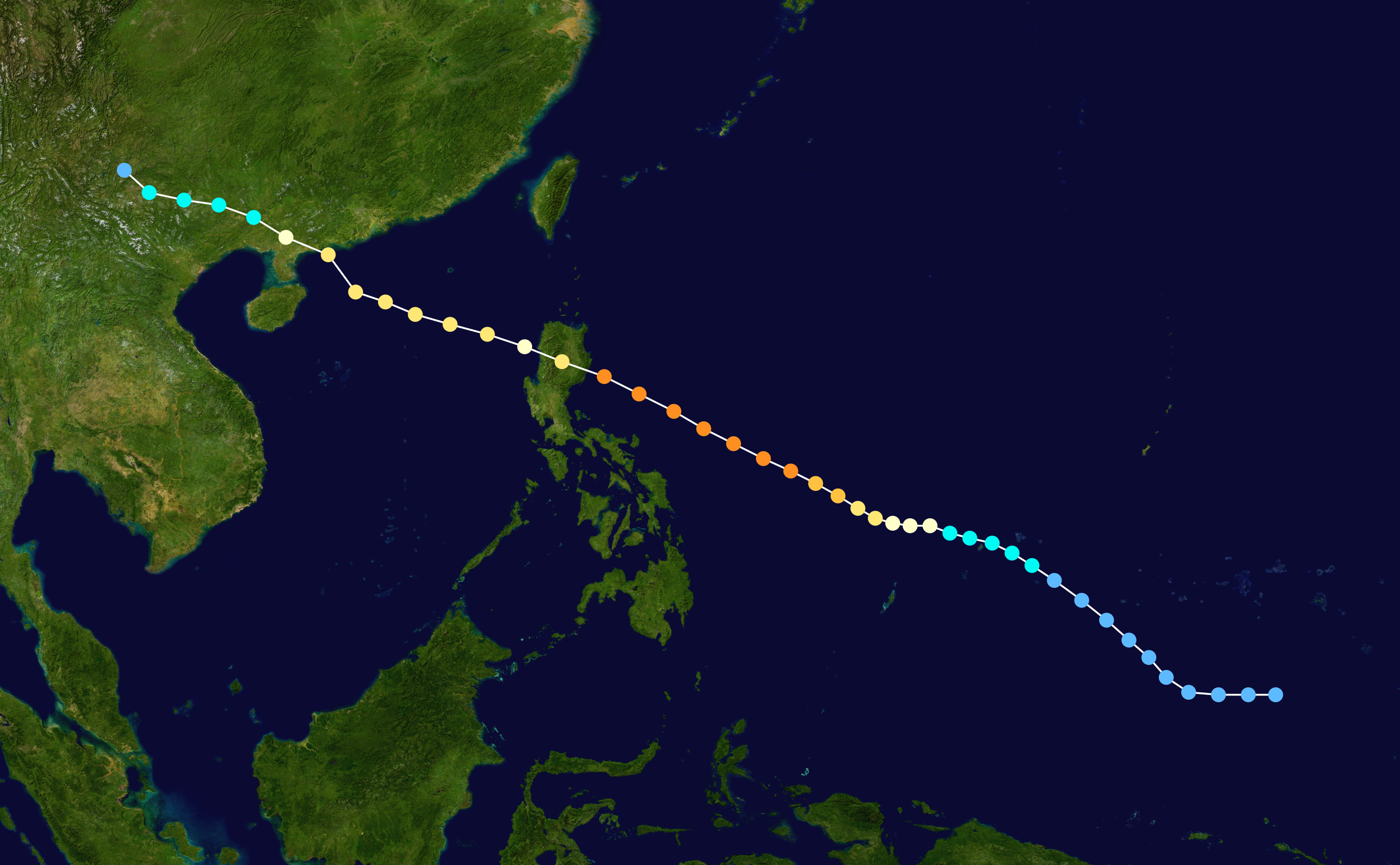
Map plotting the storm's track and intensity, according to the Saffir–Simpson scale Map key Saffir–Simpson scale Tropical depression (≤38 mph, ≤62 km/h) Tropical storm (39–73 mph, 63–118 km/h) Category 1 (74–95 mph, 119–153 km/h) Category 2 (96–110 mph, 154–177 km/h) Category 3 (111–129 mph, 178–208 km/h) Category 4 (130–156 mph, 209–251 km/h) Category 5 (≥157 mph, ≥252 km/h) Unknown Storm type Tropical cyclone Subtropical cyclone Extratropical cyclone, remnant low, tropical disturbance, or monsoon depression

The origins of Imbudo were from a disorganized area of convection near Chuuk in the open western Pacific in mid-July. With weak wind shear, the system slowly became better organized. On July 15, the Japan Meteorological Agency (JMA) (Note: The Japan Meteorological Agency is the official Regional Specialized Meteorological Center for the western Pacific Ocean.) estimated that a tropical depression formed. The next day, the Joint Typhoon Warning Center (JTWC) (Note: The Joint Typhoon Warning Center is a joint United States Navy – United States Air Force task force that issues tropical cyclone warnings for the western Pacific Ocean and other regions.) issued a tropical cyclone formation alert (TCFA), noting that outflow had increased due to an upper-level low to the northeast. At 1800 UTC on July 16, the JTWC initiated advisories on Tropical Depression 09W about 665 km (413 mi) east of Yap. A subtropical ridge near Okinawa steered the nascent depression to the west-northwest for much of its duration. With warm waters and favorable upper-level conditions, the depression quickly organized, and the JMA upgraded it to Tropical Storm Imbudo on July 17.

After becoming a tropical storm, Imbudo passed about 35 km (22 mi) north of Yap. The JMA upgraded Imbudo to a severe tropical storm late on July 18, around the same time that the JTWC upgraded it to a typhoon. An increase in outflow to the south and to the north from a tropical upper tropospheric trough (TUTT) caused a 36‑hour period of rapid development beginning on July 19. During that time, the JMA upgraded Imbudo to typhoon status, the Philippine Atmospheric, Geophysical and Astronomical Services Administration (PAGASA) began issuing advisories as the storm approached the Philippines, and a 30 km (19 mi) wide eye formed. At 1200 UTC on July 20, the JMA estimated peak 10 minute sustained winds of 165 km/h (103 mph). At the same time, the JTWC estimated 1 minute sustained winds of 240 km/h (150 mph), making it a super typhoon. By late on July 20, the typhoon had developed concentric eyewalls, and the TUTT was moving away, thus diminishing outflow. Imbudo maintained peak winds for about 12 hours, before the innermost eye contracted to a diameter of 11 km (6.8 mi) in the midst of an eyewall replacement cycle. At 0300 UTC on July 22, Imbudo struck northern Luzon, with 1 minute winds estimated at 205 km/h (127 mph) by the JTWC.

Rapidly weakening over land, Imbudo emerged into the South China Sea about six hours after landfall. The JTWC estimated winds had decreased to 150 km/h (93 mph), although the agency estimated Imbudo quickly re-intensified to a secondary peak of 165 km/h (103 mph) in 1 minute winds. Dry air prevented convection from redeveloping significantly, and the eye had become large over open waters. At 0300 UTC on July 24, Imbudo made its final landfall west of Macau, near Yangjiang, Guangdong. It was the strongest to hit the province since Typhoon Sally in 1996, striking China with 10 minute winds of 140 km/h (87 mph), as estimated by the JMA. The storm rapidly weakened over land while moving over southern China. Late on July 25, Imbudo dissipated near the border of China and Vietnam.

== Preparations ==
Before Imbudo struck, officials evacuated over 14,000 people to at least 60 shelters. Government offices were closed along the typhoon's path, and schools were closed in the capital, Manila. PAGASA issued a number 4 warning signal, the highest level, for three northern provinces, indicating the imminent threat of a powerful storm. Despite the warning, a post-storm survey in Isabela province indicated that 34% were unaware of the storm's arrival, while others believed the typhoon would not be as strong. In Manila, four flights were canceled at Ninoy Aquino International Airport, and the Manila Light Rail Transit System was shut down for two hours. Travel by ship and bus were halted in some areas. On July 22 before the storm struck, the Philippine military was put on red alert, increasing security at the presidential palace. The military stated it was due to the typhoon, although newspapers suggested it was to prevent a coup attempt; a failed coup ultimately did occur on July 27 in what would become known as the Oakwood mutiny.

The Hong Kong Observatory issued a number 8 warning signal, indicating the potential for gale-force winds within the territory. At Hong Kong International Airport, at least 100 flights were canceled or delayed. Most ferry and some bus lines were temporarily suspended. The threat of the storm caused 16 flights to be canceled and another 54 delayed at Guangzhou Baiyun International Airport. On Hainan island, 32 canceled flights stranded about 1,500 travelers. The threat of the storm forced British Prime Minister Tony Blair to shorten a trip to the territory. The Hong Kong Stock Exchange opened 30 minutes late as a result of the typhoon. On the mainland at Yangjiang, more than 30,000 people evacuated ahead of the storm.

== Impact ==
=== Philippines ===
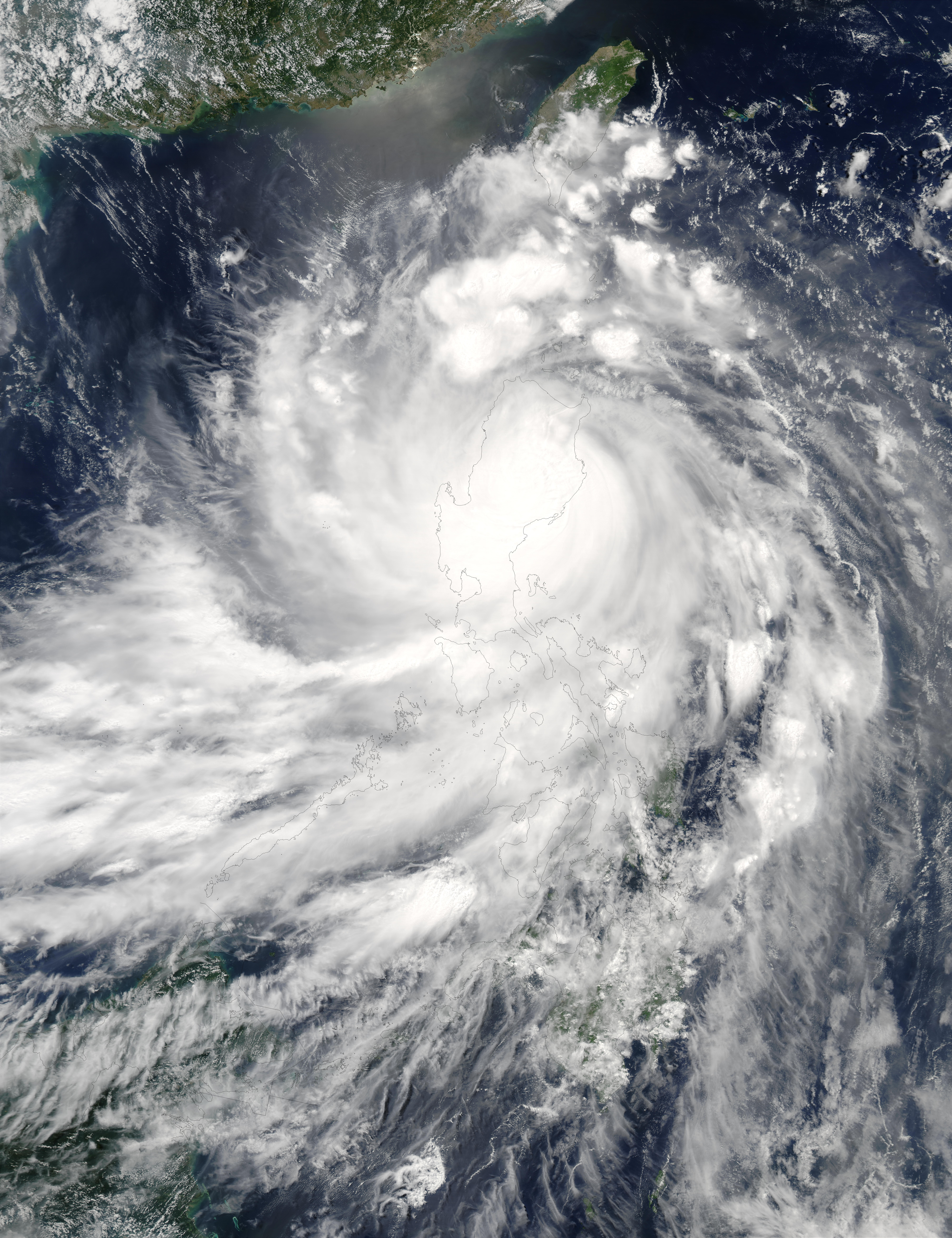
Typhoon Imbudo over the Philippines on July 22

Typhoon Imbudo was the strongest typhoon to strike Luzon since Typhoon Zeb five years prior, and was the fifth storm in eight weeks to affect the country. The typhoon left widespread areas flooded for several days. Cagayan Valley was largely isolated after a bridge was damaged in Ilocos Norte. Damage was heavy in the region, totaling P2.2 billion (PHP, $40 million USD) (Note: The total was originally reported in Philippine pesos. Total converted via the Oanda Corporation website.), and over 80,000 people were displaced by the storm. Damage was heaviest in Isabela, where damage was estimated at P1.9 billion (PHP, US$35 million), mostly to crops and killed livestock. There, winds and rain knocked down trees and caused a province-wide power outage. Most trees less than three years old fell during the high winds. In Isabela province, the banana crop was almost entirely destroyed, and most of the corn and rice crops were heavily damaged. The high damage caused the gross regional product, or overall economy of the Cagayan Valley, to decrease by 0.3% than what would have happened without the typhoon.

Power outages affected Metro Manila, and several billboards were damaged in the city, although there was minimal flooding in the capital. Adverse conditions caused the Manila Light Rail Transit System Line 1 to close for two hours, stranding hundreds. High winds knocked over a 12 m (39 ft) tree that killed five on Romblon Island. The rains brought the Magat Dam on Luzon to capacity. Landslides blocked a national highway in Nueva Ecija with debris and fallen trees, which were quickly cleared within a few days. On Mindanao, flash flooding from the outer periphery of the storm affected 18 towns, killing 11 people. In Maguindanao in the southern Philippines, flooding washed away 50 houses, forcing over 2,000 people to evacuate. Damage extended as far south as the Western Visayas. Across the Philippines, Imbudo damaged 62,314 houses, of which about 20% were destroyed. Housing damage was estimated at P1.2 billion (PHP, US$22 million), most of which in the Cagayan Valley. Overall damage in the country was estimated at P4.7 billion (PHP, US$86 million). Of the total, about P1.9 billion (PHP, US$35 million) was in agriculture damage. Imbudo killed 64 people in the Philippines, mostly in Cagayan Valley, and injured another 154.

=== Elsewhere ===
Typhoon Imbudo in the South China Sea on July 23

Early in its developmental stages, Imbudo affected portions of Micronesia, particularly Ulithi. There, a weather station measured a peak wind gust of 85 km/h (53 mph); winds of similar intensity were reported in Yap. Rainfall from Imbudo in Micronesia peaked at 226 mm (8.9 in) over a six-hour period on Yap. The rainfall from the passing tropical cyclone caused $75,000 in property damage and $25,000 in agricultural and crop-related damage.

Before Imbudo struck mainland China, it passed south of Taiwan, dropping heavy rainfall reaching 137 mm (5.4 in) in Taitung County. The outer rainbands reached as far as Okinawa, where 2 mm (0.079 in) was reported.

Peak rainfall in Hong Kong was 53.5 mm (2.11 in) at Kwai Chung, only a day after Tropical Storm Koni dropped rainfall in the territory, and the highest storm surge was 1.13 m (3.7 ft) at Tsim Bei Tsui. As the storm passed to the south, Imbudo produced winds of 101 km/h (63 mph) on Cheung Chau, the highest in the Hong Kong territory, although a gust of 164 km/h (102 mph) was observed at Tai Mo Shan. High winds killed a man after knocking him off a platform. The winds knocked down 83 trees, injuring 11 people. Rough waves injured 34 people traveling by boat near Lantau Island. In the territory, ten boats were damaged or sank, and one fishing pier was damaged.

At its final landfall in Guangdong, Imbudo produced strong winds, with a peak gust of 200 km/h (120 mph) measured at Shangchuan Island. At Yangjiang, gusts reached 159 km/h (99 mph), causing eleven boats to sink. There, over 10,000 trees fell due to the strong winds, more than half in the city, and 7,649 homes were damaged or destroyed. In Zhanjiang, the storm damaged power lines and water pumps, leaving residents without access to water. Imbudo spawned tornadoes in Luoding and Zhanjiang, damaging dozens of houses and killing 6,000 chickens. Throughout Guangdong, Imbudo destroyed 595,000 houses and caused ¥1.9 billion (CNY, US$230 million). (Note: The total was originally reported in Chinese yuan. Total converted via the Oanda Corporation website.) There were at least eight deaths in the province.

In Hainan island to the south of the storm track, rainfall reached 230 mm (9.1 in) in Ding'an County. Imbudo caused flooding in the capital Haikou, and several houses were wrecked. The typhoon affected most of the population, causing an estimated ¥55.35 million (CNY, US$6.7 million) in damage. Heavy rainfall spread across southern China, peaking at 343 mm (13.5 in) at Hepu County in Guangxi province, which increased water levels in 45 reservoirs to warning levels. The Nanliu River in Bobai County rose to 50.21 m (164.7 ft), or 0.71 m (2.3 ft) above flood stage. In Guangxi, 12 people died from storm damage or drowning, and at least 130 livestock were killed. Imbudo destroyed 4,950 houses, 3,170 of which in the city of Yulin, causing ¥499.6 million (CNY, US$60.3 million) in damage in the province. Across southern China, the typhoon damaged over 10 million hectares (25 million acres) of crop fields.

== Aftermath ==
Immediately after the storm, the Philippine Air Force were mobilized to help deliver supplies and aid in search and rescue missions. On July 24, President Gloria Macapagal Arroyo declared that the National Disaster Coordinating Council would provide assistance to citizens affected by the typhoon. The president requested P134 million (PHP, US$2.5 million) for farmers to buy new seeds, and P35 million (PHP, US$650,000) to rebuild the hard-hit Cagayan Valley, where Arroyo visited days after the storm struck. The government ultimately spent about P24 million (PHP, US$435,000) in emergency aid for relocating storm victims, search and rescue operations, and assistance. In Mindanao, officials prepared 800 bags of rice and various other food supplies due to the storm. Power and water outages persisted across Luzon for up to three weeks, causing many factories otherwise undamaged to close. In Isabela province, 25 Tzu Chi volunteers provided supplies to 2,873 houses. The Philippine government provided rice, sardines, and coffee to many affected houses. Damaged houses were supposed to receive 1,000 pesos, although few received the monetary aid. In the town of San Mariano in Isabela province, most farmers incurred more debt and continued their same general farming practice, despite sustaining heavy losses from the storm.

=== Retirement ===
In 2004, the World Meteorological Organization retired the name Imbudo and replaced it with Molave. The PAGASA name Harurot was replaced with Hanna for the 2007 season.

== See also ==
- Tropical cyclones in 2003
- Weather of 2003
- Typhoon Vera (1983)
- Typhoon Babs (1998)
- Typhoon Parma (2009)
- Typhoon Utor (2013)
- Typhoon Rammasun (2014)
