= Cyclone Katrina =

Southern Pacific cyclone in 1998

Severe Tropical Cyclone Katrina
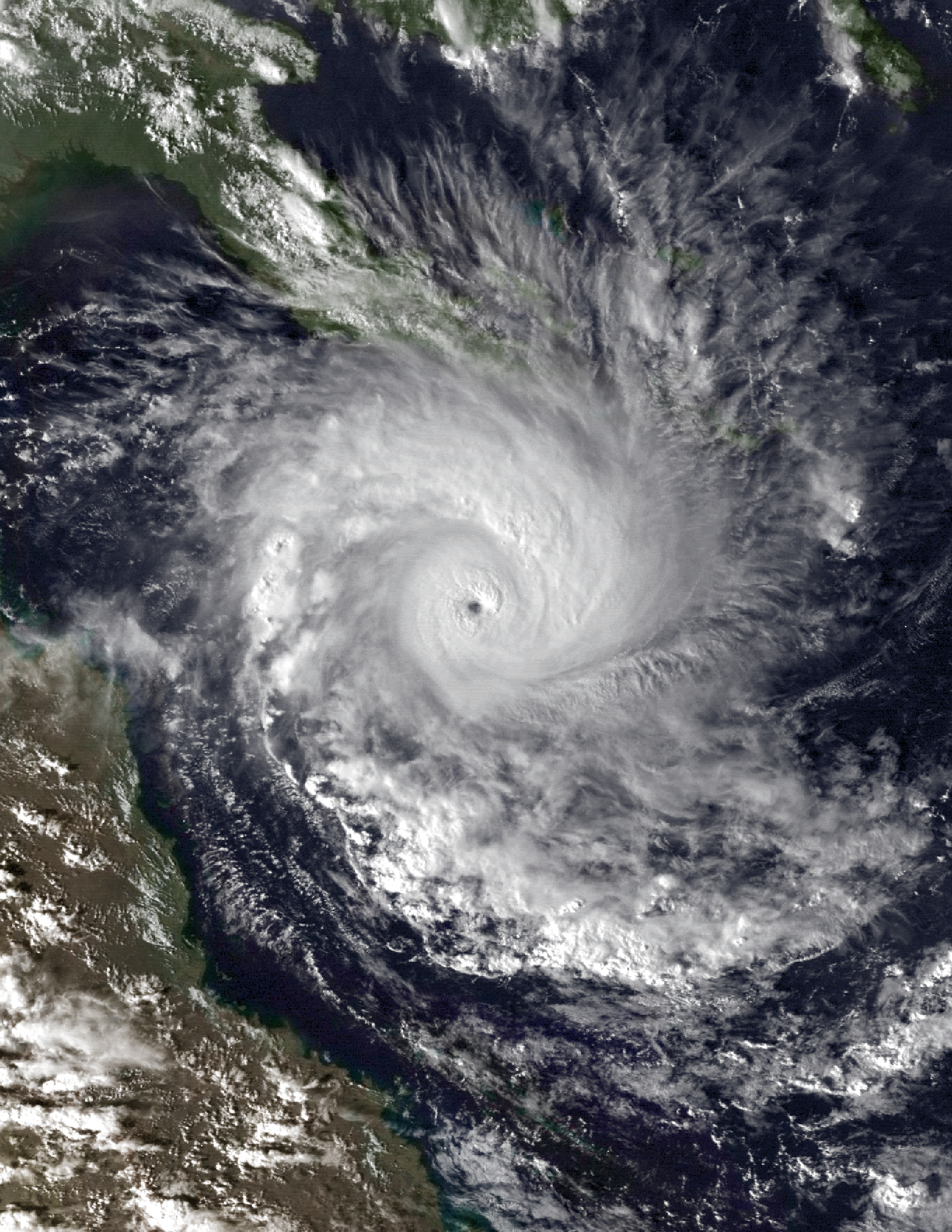
- Cyclone Katrina near peak intensity on 15 January

Meteorological history
- Formed: 1 January 1998
- Dissipated: 25 January 1998

Category 4 severe tropical cyclone
- 10-minute sustained (BOM)
- Highest winds: 165 km/h (105 mph)
- Lowest pressure: 940 hPa (mbar); 27.76 inHg

Category 2-equivalent tropical cyclone
- 1-minute sustained (SSHWS/JTWC)
- Highest winds: 165 km/h (105 mph)
- Lowest pressure: 954 hPa (mbar); 28.17 inHg

Overall effects
- Fatalities: 2 total
- Damage: $8.66 million (1998 USD)
- Areas affected: Solomon Islands; Vanuatu; Queensland
- IBTrACS
- Part of the 1997–98 Australian region and South Pacific cyclone seasons

Severe Tropical Cyclone Katrina was a long-lived tropical cyclone that moved erratically over the South Pacific Ocean in January of 1998, before eventually moving into the southern Indian Ocean. Katrina was the fourth tropical cyclone and named storm of the 1997–98 Australian region cyclone season. Katrina developed on 1 January and meandered within the Coral Sea between the Queensland coast and Vanuatu for the next three weeks, before degenerating into a remnant low near Far North Queensland on 25 January. The remnants of Katrina moved westward over Cape York Peninsula and the Gulf of Carpentaria, before possibly regenerating into Cyclone Victor on February 8.

Cyclone Katrina impacted parts of Queensland, Vanuatu, and the Solomon Islands, killing two people and causing $8.66 million (1998 USD) in damages.

== Meteorological history ==
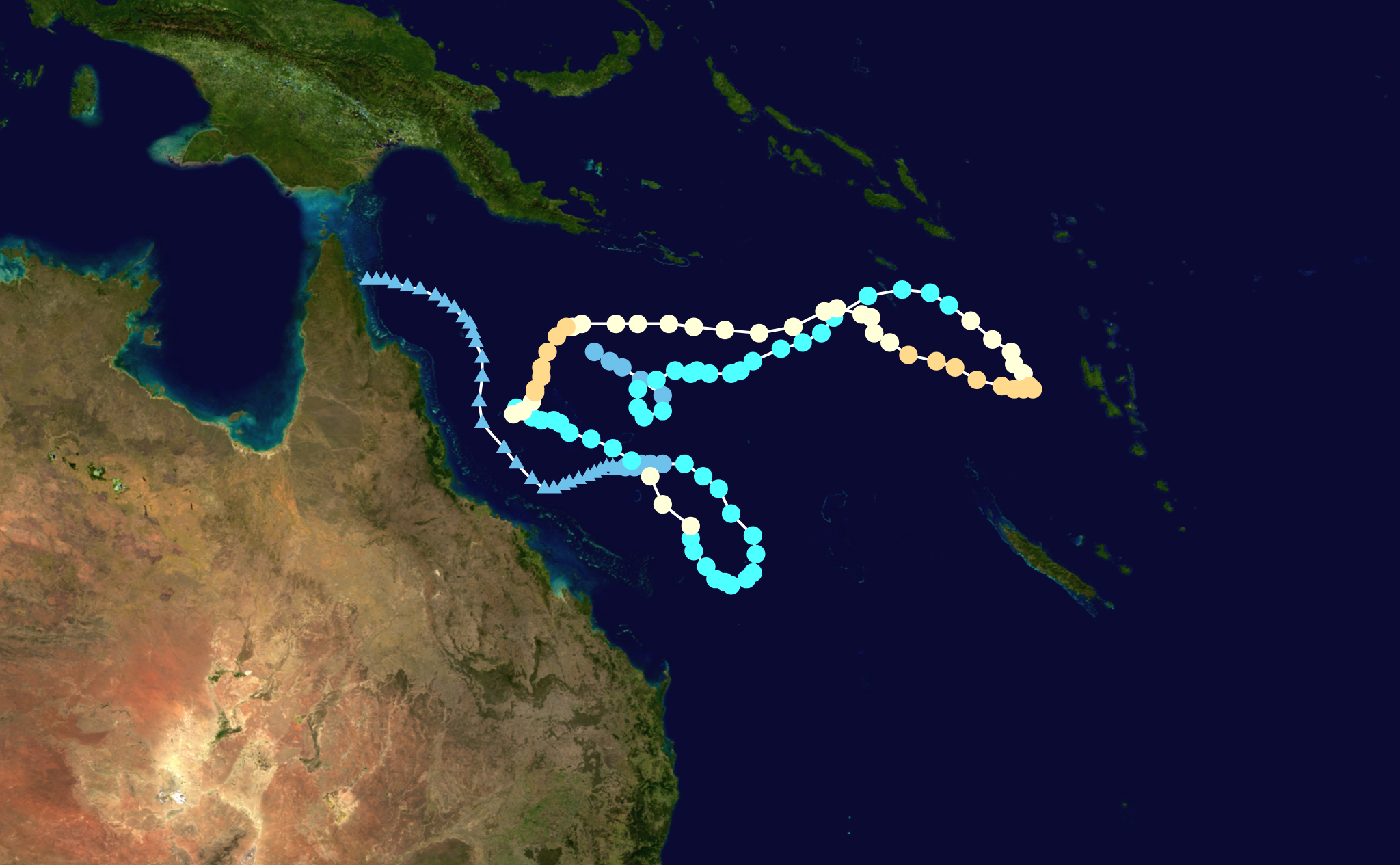
Map plotting the storm's track and intensity, according to the Saffir–Simpson scale Map key Saffir–Simpson scale Tropical depression (≤38 mph, ≤62 km/h) Tropical storm (39–73 mph, 63–118 km/h) Category 1 (74–95 mph, 119–153 km/h) Category 2 (96–110 mph, 154–177 km/h) Category 3 (111–129 mph, 178–208 km/h) Category 4 (130–156 mph, 209–251 km/h) Category 5 (≥157 mph, ≥252 km/h) Unknown Storm type Tropical cyclone Subtropical cyclone Extratropical cyclone, remnant low, tropical disturbance, or monsoon depression

On 1 January, the Australian Bureau of Meteorology (BoM) started to monitor a tropical low that had developed within the monsoon trough about 630 km (390 mi) to the east-northeast of Cairns in Queensland, Australia. During that day, the system moved south-eastward, before it entered an area of weak steering flow, which made the system perform a small cyclonic loop over the next two days. Early on 3 January, the United States Joint Typhoon Warning Center (JTWC) initiated advisories on the system and designated it as Tropical Cyclone 12P. This was after the system had rapidly intensified, and a wind report of 57 km/h (35 mph) had been received from Lihou Reef. At about the same time, the BoM named the system Katrina, as it had become a Category 1 tropical cyclone on the Australian tropical cyclone intensity scale. After the system was named, an increase in the deep westerly flow to the north of the system caused Katrina to start moving north-eastward, towards the South Pacific basin. Over the next few days, the system slowly intensified further, as the system's inflow was dominated by Cyclone Susan, which was rapidly intensifying to the west of Vanuatu. Susan's outflow also caused a moderate amount of vertical wind shear over Katrina, which helped to inhibit development of the system and weakened it slightly.

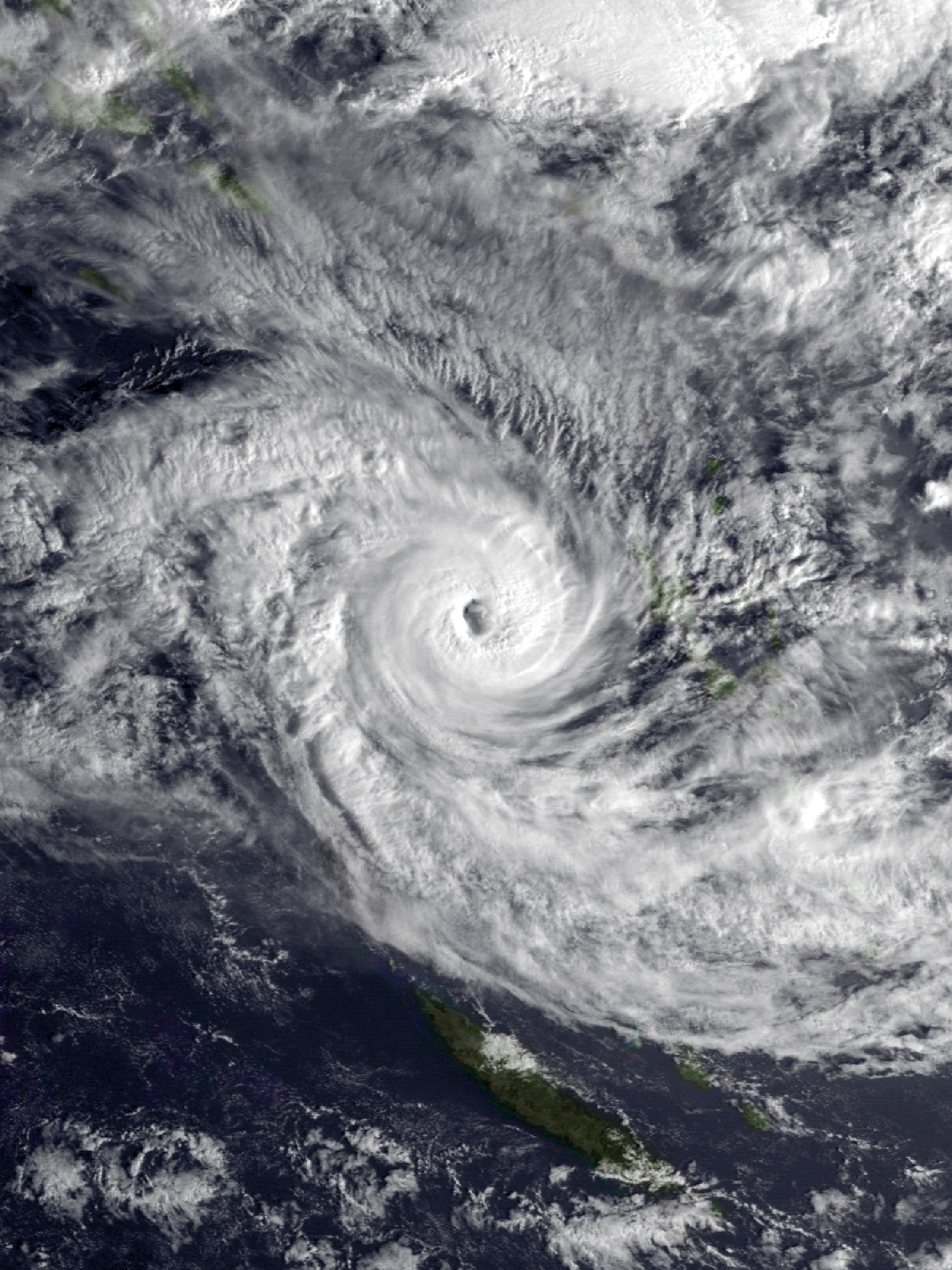
Cyclone Katrina west of Vanuatu on 9 January

Katrina crossed 160°E and moved into the South Pacific basin during 7 January, where it was monitored by the Fiji Meteorological Service (FMS), as it passed about 90 km (55 mi) to the south of Rennell Island in the Solomon Islands. The system subsequently started move south-eastward towards the island nation of Vanuatu, as started to intensify faster, as Susan moved south-eastward towards Fiji. The system subsequently came within 220 km (135 mi) of Vanuatu's northernmost island, Espiritu Santo, before it recurved westward during 9 January, due to a weakening of the monsoonal westerlies and the development of an anticyclone to the south of the system. Later that day, the FMS reported that the system had peaked as a Category 3 severe tropical cyclone on the Australian region scale, with 10-minute sustained wind speeds of 150 km/h (90 mph). The JTWC also reported during 9 January that the system had peaked with 1-minute sustained wind speeds of 165 km/h (105 mph), which made the system equivalent to a Category 2 hurricane on the Saffir–Simpson hurricane wind scale.

On 11 January, Katrina moved south of Rennell Island and then crossed back into the Brisbane area six hours later, where it crossed the 160E on its eastward journey, then the storm turned westward, where it maintained that course until 15 January. On January 15, the storm moved south-southwestward, where it reached Category 2-equivalent strength on the Saffir–Simpson Hurricane Scale, with a central barometric pressure of 940 millibars (28 inHg). Katrina weakened rapidly and slowed before making a tight loop on 17 and 18 January. After completing the loop, Cyclone Katrina moved eastward for 12 hours, before moving east-southeastward for three days. During that time, Katrina briefly reached Category 1 strength once more, before slowing down and being affected by wind shear. By 24 January, Katrina had weakened to a tropical depression. Over the next few days, Katrina's remnant low moved south-westward, before turning northwestward during 28 January. The system then possibly reformed into Cyclone Victor on 8 February.

== Impact ==
Cyclone Katrina impacted parts of Queensland, Vanuatu, and the Solomon Islands, where it caused two deaths and $8.66 million (1998 USD) in damages. Fears were also raised that Katrina could threaten Fiji, as it interacted with Cyclone Susan, which in turn interacted with Cyclone Ron. Due to the impact of this storm, the name Katrina was retired from the lists of tropical cyclone names for the Australian region.

=== Solomon Islands ===
Katrina passed near Solomon Islands on two separate occasions while it was active, with the cyclone first affecting the archipelago between 6–8 January, before grazing the archipelago during 11 January. As the system affected the archipelago, Katrina brought heavy rainfall, high seas and waves of about 10 m (33 ft) to parts of Guadalcanal, Makira-Ulawa, Malaita, Rennell and Bellona provinces. As a result of the high waves, twenty families had to abandon the village of Kopiu on the island of Guadalcanal and move to a Seventh Day Adventist school. Within the Solomon Islands, 450 homes were destroyed on the islands of Rennell and Bellona, while on southern Guadalcanal, 200 homes were destroyed, as the system brushed the islands.

The Solomon Islands National Disaster Council met on 8 January, in order to determine if any assistance was needed and if a further assessment was necessary to determine the full extent of damage. During the next day aerial and ground surveys of Rennell and Bellona and the southern parts of Makira and Guadalcanal island took place.

As the cyclone affected the island nation, islanders evacuated their homes and took shelter in caves. The Red Cross and other non-government organizations provided aid within the islands. The Solomon Islands National Disaster Council also appealed, for public help and donations to help provide emergency shelter and supplies.

=== Vanuatu ===
During 8–9 January, while the system was located within the South Pacific basin, Katrina posed a threat to Vanuatu which had just been affected by Cyclone Susan a couple of days earlier. After Susan had moved away, most shops and government buildings on the island of Efate, had kept their shutters up in preparation for the system affecting the archipelago. In Vanuatu, a man drowned after being swept away by large swells and rough seas while fishing.

=== Australia ===
After battering some of these islands, the erratically tracking storm reversed direction and threatened another disaster-struck region, Queensland, Australia. By 16 January, officials warned that further rains from the storm could renew floods to regions still recovering from destructive ones earlier in the month. Residents were advised to trim branches off trees, secure outdoor objects, clean their gutters and stock up on emergency supplies. According to press reports, the threat of a landfalling cyclone was, "the worst news for Townsville." Cyclone watches were declared for parts of the Queensland coastline between Cape Melville and Bowen. Cleanup efforts were rushed as debris had to be cleared from flood-stricken areas before the storm struck. On 18 January, the 1,000 relief workers brought into the region after the floods were placed on standby to protect their well-being as the storm moved through. After Katrina stalled and turned away from Queensland on 19 January, the cyclone watch area was revised to encompass areas between Cardwell and Mackay. A strong wind warning was also put in effect from Cairns to Bowen. The following day, these advisories were discontinued as the storm no longer posed a threat to land.

Off the coast of Queensland, Willis Island was impacted by Katrina twice: once on 3 January and again between 16 and 18 January. Both instances brought heavy rains, amounting to storm total of 443.2 mm (17.45 in), more than twice the monthly average. While crossing the Cape York Peninsula, the remnants of Katrina brought moderate rains to the region, exceeding 60 mm (2.4 in) in some areas.

== See also ==
- Tropical cyclones in 1998
- Cyclone Rewa (1993–94) – Long-lived tropical cyclone which had a similar path to Katrina.
- Cyclone Justin (1997) – Another long-lived tropical cyclone which meandered between Queensland and Papua New Guinea.
- Cyclone Leon–Eline (2000) – Formerly the longest-lived tropical cyclone recorded in the Indian Ocean, also crossed from the Australian Region to the South-West Indian Ocean basin like Victor–Cindy.
- Hurricane John (1994) – Formerly the longest-lived tropical cyclone ever recorded worldwide.
- Hurricane Nadine (2012) – Similarly erratic hurricane in the Atlantic basin.
- Cyclone Freddy (2023) – The longest-lived tropical cyclone ever recorded worldwide.
