= Typhoon Zeb =

Pacific typhoon in 1998

Typhoon Zeb (Iliang)
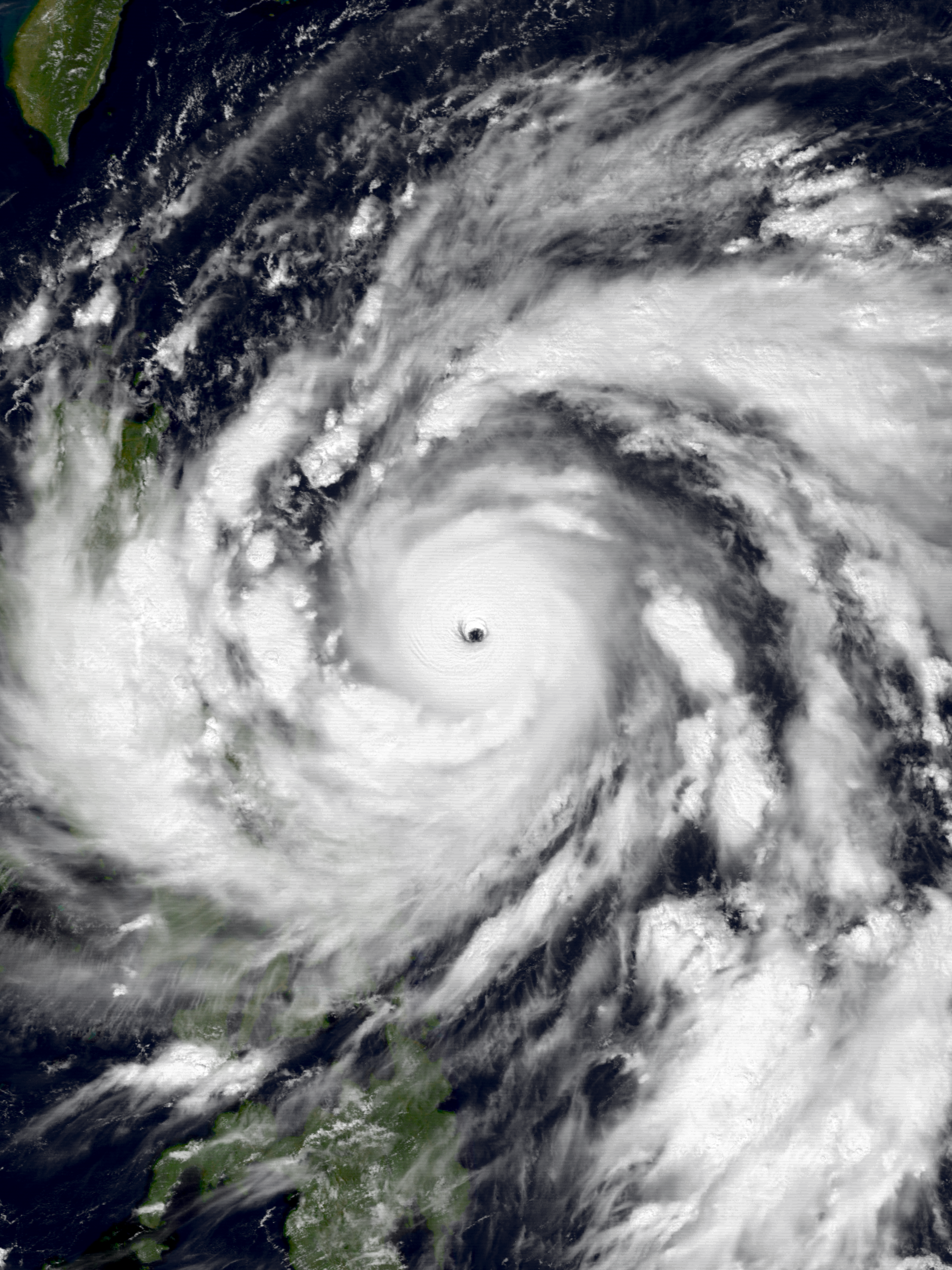
- Typhoon Zeb approaching Luzon near peak intensity on October 13

Meteorological history
- Formed: October 10, 1998
- Extratropical: October 18, 1998
- Dissipated: October 20, 1998

Violent typhoon
- 10-minute sustained (JMA)
- Highest winds: 205 km/h (125 mph)
- Lowest pressure: 900 hPa (mbar); 26.58 inHg

Category 5-equivalent super typhoon
- 1-minute sustained (SSHWS/JTWC)
- Highest winds: 285 km/h (180 mph)
- Lowest pressure: 878 hPa (mbar); 25.93 inHg

Overall effects
- Fatalities: 122 total
- Damage: $576 million (1998 USD)
- Areas affected: Philippines, Taiwan, Japan
- IBTrACS
- Part of the 1998 Pacific typhoon season

Typhoon Zeb, named Iliang by PAGASA, was a powerful typhoon that struck the island of Luzon in October 1998. It is tied with Cyclone Ron and Cyclone Susan in terms of minimum pressure, for the most intense tropical cyclone worldwide for 1998. The tenth tropical storm of the season, Zeb formed on October 10 from the monsoon trough near the Caroline Islands. It moved westward initially and quickly intensified. Zeb's inflow briefly spawned another tropical storm, which it ultimately absorbed. Developing an eye, Zeb rapidly intensified into a super typhoon, officially reaching maximum sustained winds of 205 km/h (125 mph); one warning agency estimated winds as high as 285 km/h (180 mph). After reaching peak intensity, the typhoon struck northern Luzon and quickly weakened over land. Turning to the north, Zeb brushed the east coast of Taiwan at a reduced intensity, and after accelerating to the northeast it moved through Japan. It became extratropical on October 18 and moved eastward over open waters.

First affecting the Philippines, Zeb dropped torrential rainfall in Luzon, reaching 1,116 millimetres (43.9 inches) in one day in La Trinidad, estimated as a one-in-1,147-year event. The rains caused floods and landslides, which compounded with high winds to leave heavy crop damage. Zeb destroyed or damaged 85,844 houses in the Philippines, and damage in the country was estimated at ₱5.375 billion (1998 Philippine pesos, $126 million U.S. dollars), the fifth-costliest at the time. There were also 83 deaths in the country, a number compounded upon when Typhoon Babs struck the same region a week later. High winds and rainfall from Zeb later affected Taiwan, causing NT$4.15 billion (New Taiwan dollar, US$125 million) in damage as well as 31 deaths. Gusty winds affected much of Japan, while heavy rainfall peaked at 586 mm (23.1 in) on Mount Ontake. The storm killed 14 people in the country, several related to landslides. Zeb destroyed 770 homes and flooded another 12,548 in Japan.

== Meteorological history ==
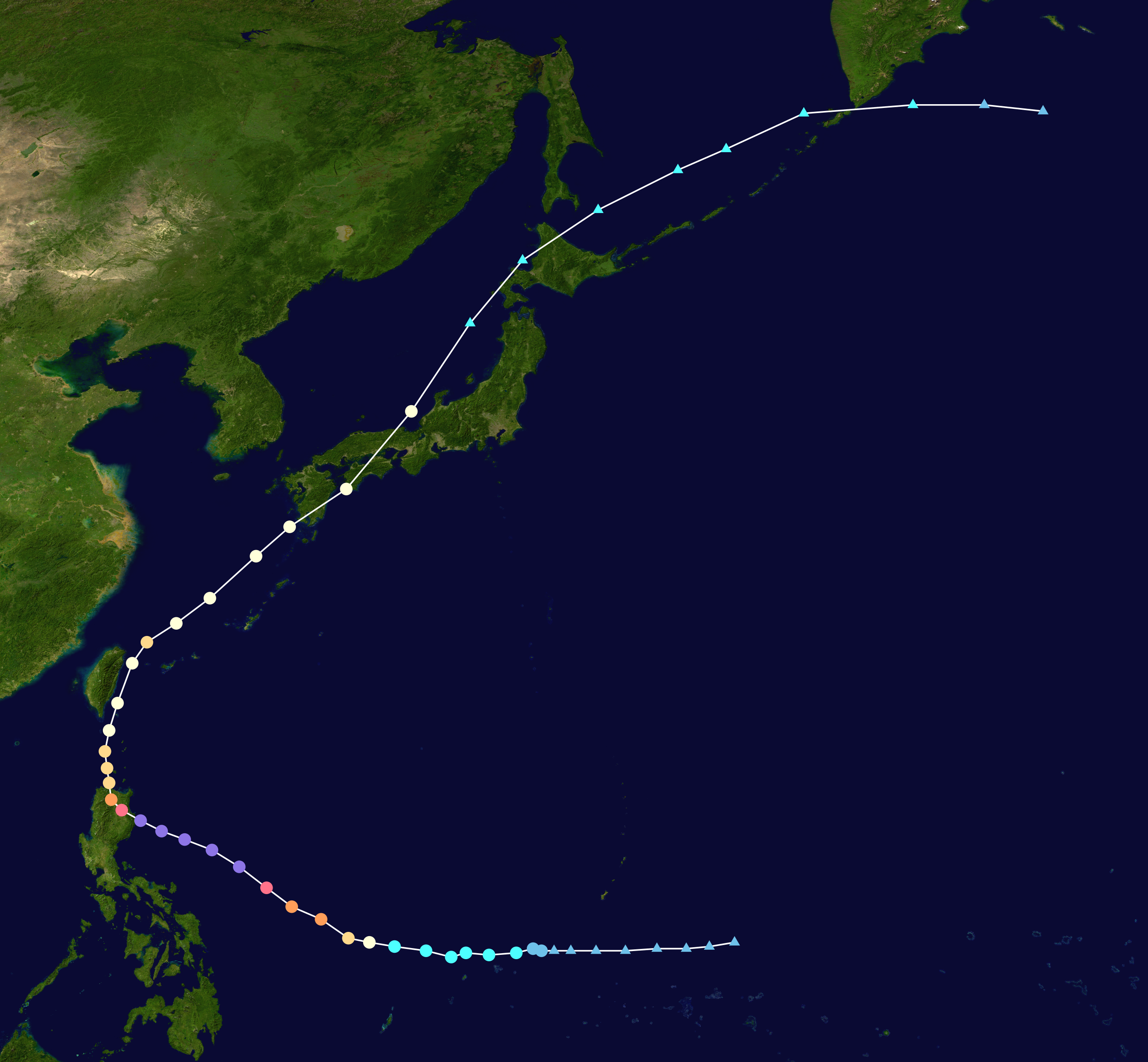
Map plotting the storm's track and intensity, according to the Saffir–Simpson scale Map key Saffir–Simpson scale Tropical depression (≤38 mph, ≤62 km/h) Tropical storm (39–73 mph, 63–118 km/h) Category 1 (74–95 mph, 119–153 km/h) Category 2 (96–110 mph, 154–177 km/h) Category 3 (111–129 mph, 178–208 km/h) Category 4 (130–156 mph, 209–251 km/h) Category 5 (≥157 mph, ≥252 km/h) Unknown Storm type Tropical cyclone Subtropical cyclone Extratropical cyclone, remnant low, tropical disturbance, or monsoon depression

The monsoon trough spawned a tropical disturbance over the western Pacific Ocean to the east of Guam around October 7. The system moved steadily westward, organizing enough for the American-based Joint Typhoon Warning Center (JTWC) to issue a Tropical Cyclone Formation Alert early on October 9. After the disturbance passed south of Guam, the JTWC began issuing advisories on Tropical Depression 18W late on October 9, and the Japan Meteorological Agency (JMA) followed suit the next day. While passing north of Yap in the Caroline Islands, the depression intensified into a tropical storm according to the JTWC, which gave it the name Zeb. The JMA again was delayed in upgrading by a day.

After becoming a tropical storm, Zeb proceeded to steadily intensify. Its large inflow spawned a circulation well to the east-northeast, which organized into a separate tropical storm – Alex. Early on October 11, the storm entered the area of responsibility of PAGASA – the Philippine-based weather agency – which gave it the local name Iliang. Late on October 11, the JTWC upgraded Zeb to typhoon status, or one-minute winds of at least 120 km/h (75 mph). This was based on the appearance of a banding-type eye on satellite imagery. On October 12, the storm rapidly intensified as it turned more to the west-northwest toward the Philippines. During this time, it caused increased wind shear over the smaller Tropical Storm Alex to the east-northeast, ultimately absorbing it. At 00:00 UTC on October 13, the JTWC upgraded Zeb to super typhoon status, estimating winds of 260 km/h (160 mph), marking that Zeb attained Category 5 status on the Saffir-Simpson scale. Twelve hours later, the agency estimated that the typhoon strengthened further to a peak of 285 km/h (180 mph), making it the strongest storm of the season. At the same time, PAGASA also estimated peak 10-minute winds of 240 km/h (150 mph), also designating Zeb as a super typhoon. Late on October 13, the JMA estimated peak 10-minute winds of 205 km/h (127 mph) just east of the island of Luzon. While near peak intensity, the JTWC estimated that winds of 185 km/h (115 mph) extended 95 kilometres (59 miles), and gales extended 465 km (289 mi) from the center.

Zeb's eyewall continued to contract up until it moved ashore. Early on October 14, Zeb made landfall on eastern Luzon just south of Palanan Bay, or east of Ilagan, near peak intensity. The typhoon weakened rapidly over land, while its track shifted more to the north around a ridge to the east. It emerged into the Luzon Strait between the eponymous island and Taiwan with a much larger eyewall, and failed to re-intensify over open waters. Late on October 15, Zeb passed within 19 km (12 mi) of Taiwan's east coast before accelerating to the northeast due to a passing trough. The JMA downgraded the typhoon to tropical storm status on October 16, although the JTWC retained Zeb at typhoon status. Favorable upper-level conditions allowed the storm to briefly re-intensify after passing Taiwan, although this was short-lived, and it weakened while accelerating toward Japan. At 07:00 UTC on October 17, Zeb struck southern Kyushu in Kagoshima Prefecture. It continued northeastward through the country, striking Kōchi Prefecture on Shikoku and later crossing central Honshu as a tropical storm. During this time, the storm was losing tropical characteristics as it swiftly entered the Sea of Japan. At 00:00 UTC on October 18, the JMA declared Zeb extratropical, and shortly after the storm moved over northern Hokkaido and into the Sea of Okhotsk. The remnants moved across the southern Kamchatka Peninsula and continued eastward through the open north Pacific. It was last noted by the JMA early on October 20.

== Preparations ==
Ahead of the storm, PAGASA issued Public Storm Warning Signal #4, in which winds of over 185 km/h (115 mph) were expected within 12 hours. The warning covered Batanes, Cagayan, Isabela, Quirino, and northern Aurora. Lesser warnings were issued as far south as the Visayas, and extended into the Metro Manila area. After two damaging storms in September, the government began making widespread preparations on October 13, organizing efforts through its National Disaster Coordinating Council. Ports were closed and flights were canceled due to the storm. Before the worst of the storm struck, power companies shut off electricity to prevent accidents. About 103,000 people evacuated their homes, including over 6,325 staying in 114 government shelters. Evacuations extended as far south as Camarines Sur.

The Hong Kong Observatory issued a stand-by warning signal #1 due to the storm's proximity to the South China Sea.

Before Zeb brushed the east coast of Taiwan, a typhoon warning was issued, causing schools, government buildings, and financial markets to close. Airports and ferry travel were also disrupted. 183 residents evacuated to storm shelters, including 50 from a nursing home. Hundreds of Chinese fishing boats rode out the storm in Taiwan harbors. Similarly to Taiwan, Zeb delayed ferry service in Japan, and caused 271 domestic flights to be canceled. Train service was canceled on Kyushu during the storm.

== Impact ==
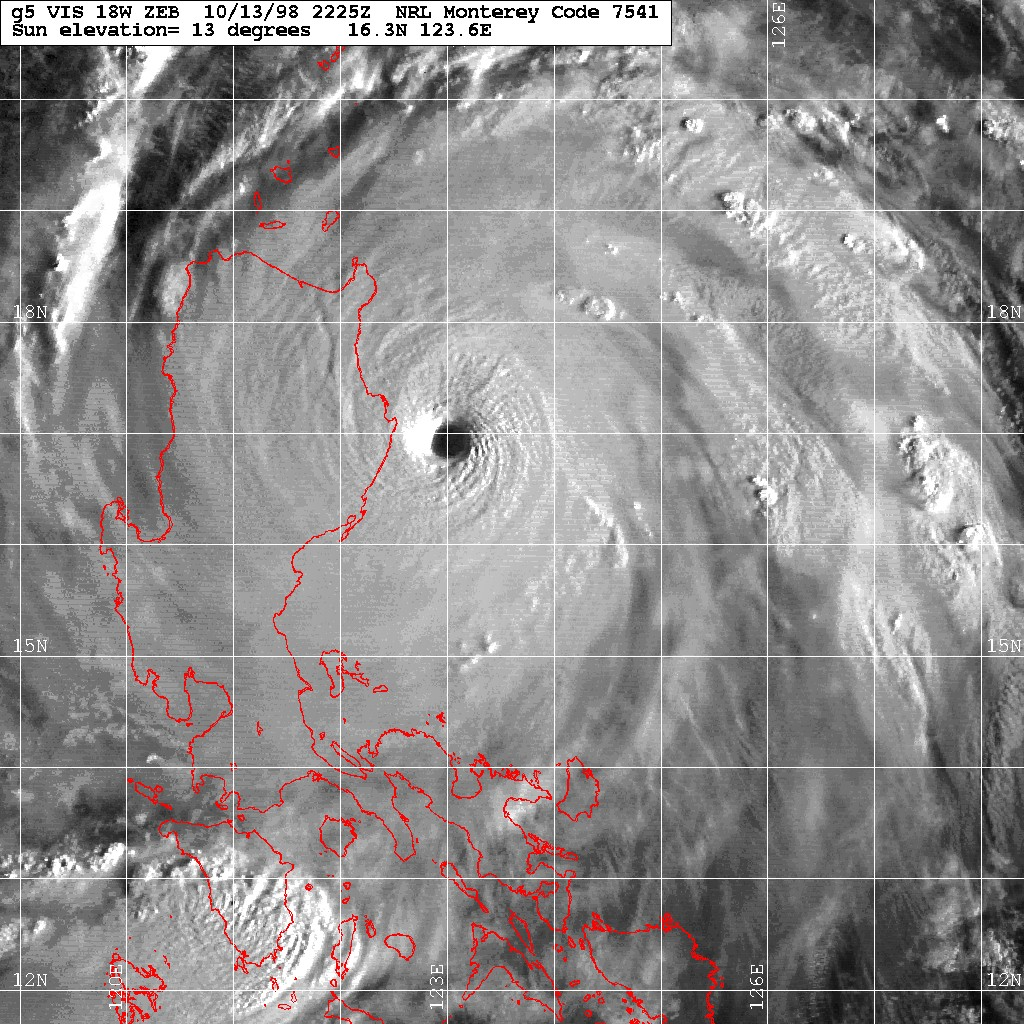
Zeb shortly before landfall on October 13

=== Philippines ===
Striking the Philippines at peak intensity, Zeb largely affected the island of Luzon, including the regions of Ilocos, Cagayan Valley, and Central Luzon. Wind gusts were estimated as high as 296 km/h (184 mph) in the country. The storm also dropped torrential rainfall, particularly in mountainous regions. In the municipality of Bakun, the 1,000-millimetre (39-inch) rain gauge overflowed, and in nearby La Trinidad, the rainfall was 1,116 mm (43.9 in) on October 14 alone. The latter total was estimated as a one-in-1,147-year event, based on the history of local rainfall totals. In the city of Baguio, the precipitation reached 994.6 mm (39.16 in), enough to flood the town 9 m (30 ft) deep. The Binga and Ambuclao dams in Benguet were unable to support the rains from the storm, forcing them to be opened and flood three towns in neighboring Pangasinan. Minor street flooding occurred along the west coast near Manila.

Across Luzon, the high rains caused flooding, landslides, and halted construction of a dam in Bakun. Considered one of the strongest typhoons to hit the area in decades, Zeb knocked down trees and power lines, which covered roads and left areas isolated. The winds were strong enough to blow over a jeepney. Along its path, the storm destroyed 26,305 houses and damaged another 59,539, mostly affecting those of weaker building materials. River flooding caused heavy damage to crops, estimated at ₱1.76 billion (1998 Philippine pesos, $41.3 million U.S. dollars); the storm destroyed 181,630 t (400,430,000 lb) of rice in Ilocos Region and Cagayan Valley. Most of the damage occurred in Luzon, with little impact elsewhere. The storm also marred the local infrastructure; areas in northeastern Luzon were isolated when landslides blocked a highway, and several other roads and bridges were impassible. Overall, Zeb killed 83 people in the country, while injuring another 63; most of the deaths were related to the landslides, and 33 of the deaths were in Cordillera Administrative Region. Overall damage was estimated at ₱5.375 billion (PHP, US$126 million), which as of 2011 was the thirteenth-costliest typhoon in the Philippines and the fifth-costliest at the time.

=== Elsewhere ===
The interaction between Zeb and the monsoon brought gusty winds to Hong Kong, reaching 88 km/h (55 mph) on Cheung Chau. High tides were also recorded, although there was no reported damage in the territory.

Later, Zeb produced sustained winds of 155 km/h (96 mph) in Taiwan, although gusts topped at 191 km/h (119 mph). The typhoon dropped torrential rainfall in the northern and eastern portions of the island, with peak hourly rates of 42.1 mm (1.66 in). Several regions of Taiwan received over 400 mm (16 in) of rainfall. The rains caused severe flooding along rivers, with a peak discharge of 3715 m^{3}/s (131,193 ft^{3}/s). The high rainfall forced workers at the Fei-tsui Dam to release water, after water levels rose by 300 mm (12 in). Landslides near Taipei wrecked homes, trapping at least two people. Landslides also covered several highways while floods washed away bridges, cutting off traffic. Flooding occurred in the suburbs of Taipei, and the winds were strong enough to cause skyscrapers to sway in the city. Zeb's winds knocked over trees, billboards, and power lines, leaving 1.15 million without electricity. Two-story high waves killed a fisherman in Taitung City, washed a freighter ashore in Taichung, and capsized a boat in Tamsui District, killing one sailor; five of the others on board swam two hours to reach shore. The storm left $57.6 million (USD) in crop damage, after hundreds of acres of fields were damaged in the southern and central Taiwan. Overall damage was estimated at NT$4.15 billion (New Taiwan dollar, US$125 million), and there were 31 confirmed deaths in Taiwan, with 19 people injured.

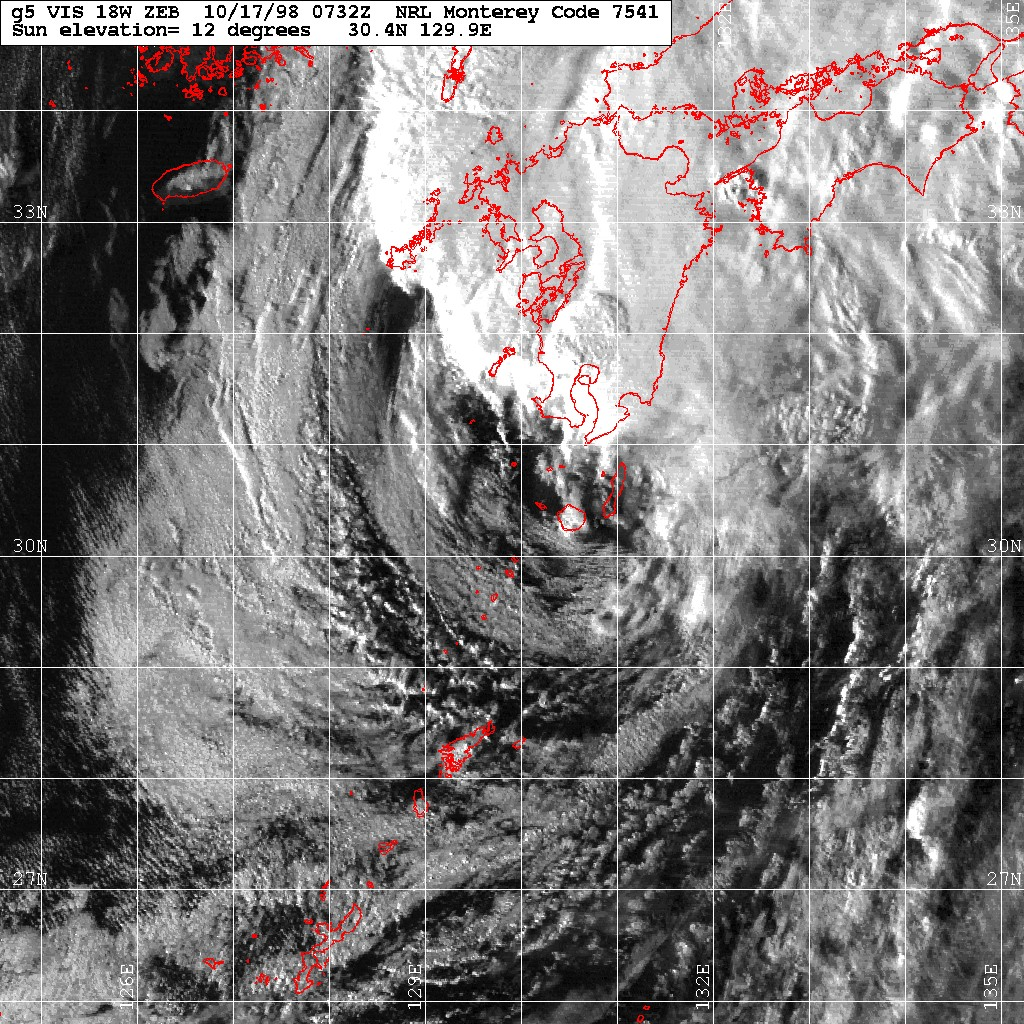
Typhoon Zeb making landfall on Kyushu on October 17

While moving through Japan, Zeb produced peak sustained winds of 130 km/h (81 mph) in Kōchi Prefecture within Shikoku. The highest rainfall was 586 mm (23.1 in) on Mount Ontake on Honshu. The widespread rainfall caused 332 landslides and washed away seven bridges. Within Japan, Zeb first affected Miyako-jima while passing about 180 km (110 mi) to the northwest. High winds left 2,600 houses without power and caused damage to public buildings. It later passed about 230 km (140 mi) to the northwest of Okinawa. Along the island, wind gusts reached 134 km/h (83 mph), and wave heights peaked at 13.7 m (45 ft). The waves swept away two people over a sea wall, killing them both. High waves also damaged a port at Kadena Air Base as well as several houses near the coast. The storm also passed near the Yaeyama Islands with strong winds. Salt spray coated trees and ruined them, and there was scattered public building damage.

On Kyushu, Zeb damaged houses, marred crops, and flooded rivers. The storm spawned a tornado in Miyazaki Prefecture that damaged two roofs and a vehicle. In Saganoseki, a motorist died after a roadway collapse landed his vehicle in a nearby river. On Shikoku, Zeb destroyed roads and farmlands and eroded lands along waterways. Three people died due to a landslide in Matsuyama. In Okayama Prefecture along Honshu, Zeb left six people missing or killed and was the costliest typhoon since Typhoon Fran in 1976. Landslides killed three people in Hiroshima Prefecture. Power outages and landslides affected much of Honshu, while strong winds damaged many fields. A cargo freighter washed aground amid high waves in Shizuoka Prefecture, causing oil to leak and requiring assistance from the Coast Guard; oil recovery equipment was sent to the area to clean the spill. Lastly, Zeb affected the northern island of Hokkaido, causing one landslide, damaging 152 buildings, and knocking 152,000 apples to the ground. Nationwide, Zeb destroyed 770 homes and flooded another 12,548, with thousands forced to evacuate their homes due to flooding. Overall, there were 14 deaths and 67 injuries, with damage estimated at $335.5 million (1998 USD).

== Aftermath ==
After the storm, then-Philippine president Joseph Estrada declared six provinces as a state of calamity, which allocated ₱1 million in emergency funds for each province. The president was unable to return home from a trip to Singapore due to the storm. The military was activated to help organize relief efforts, using rubber boats and trucks to reach the hardest hit areas as floodwaters decreased. They were aided by the Philippine Red Cross and other government agencies. Most evacuees returned home after the storm passed, excluding those whose houses sustained damage. Volunteers, the military, and public workers helped clean up from the damage. Just seven days after Zeb's damaging Philippine landfall, another typhoon—Babs—struck the same general region with a similar, but lesser intensity. After both storms, the Philippine National Electrification Administration provided ₱1.78 million to the Batanes Electric Cooperative to restore damaged power lines. Power was gradually restored in northeastern Luzon, allowing communication of the damage extent. The nation's Department of Health distributed ₱547,469 worth of medicine to four provinces. The government airlifted about 3,000 bags of supplies to Cagayan that included rice and canned goods. The back to back storm impacts caused an estimated 30% drop in coconut exports. Food prices rose dramatically, in some instances up to 400%, after both storms damaged crops. The storms also delayed shipments of sugar from neighboring countries, although prices were expected to fall once they arrived. By December 1998, consumer prices had risen by 11.2% over the previous year due to the typhoons' damage.

Workers in Taiwan began a search-and-rescue mission for missing victims once the typhoon warning was lifted. Workers immediately began repairing road damage in Japan once the storm passed.

== See also ==
- Typhoon Koppu
- Typhoon Noul (2015)
- Typhoon Nida (2004)
- Typhoon Haima
- Typhoon Megi (2010)
- Typhoon Chanthu (2021)
- Typhoon Usagi (2024)
