= List of storms named Molave =

The name Molave (Tagalog: molave, [moˈlaːvɛ]) has been used to name three tropical cyclones in the northwestern Pacific Ocean. The name was contributed by the Philippines and refers to the smallflower chastetree (Vitex parviflora) in Tagalog. It replaced Imbudo (Tagalog: imbudo, [ʔɪmˈbuː.do]), which means funnel in Tagalog, after it was retired following the 2003 Pacific typhoon season.

- Typhoon Molave (2009) (T0906, 07W, Isang) - made landfall east of Hong Kong.
- Tropical Storm Molave (2015) (T1514, 15W) - never affected land.
- Typhoon Molave (2020) (T2018, 21W, Quinta) - a powerful typhoon that devastated the Southern Luzon area of the Philippines and Vietnam.

The name Molave was retired following the 2020 Pacific typhoon season and was replaced with Narra (Tagalog: narra, [ˈnaɾɐ]), which refers to the narra tree (Pterocarpus indicus), also the national tree of the Philippines.

- Tropical Storm Narra (2026) (T2619, 18W) - affected Vietnam and southern China.
