= Cyclone Susan =

Category 5 South Pacific cyclone in 1997 and 1998

Severe Tropical Cyclone Susan
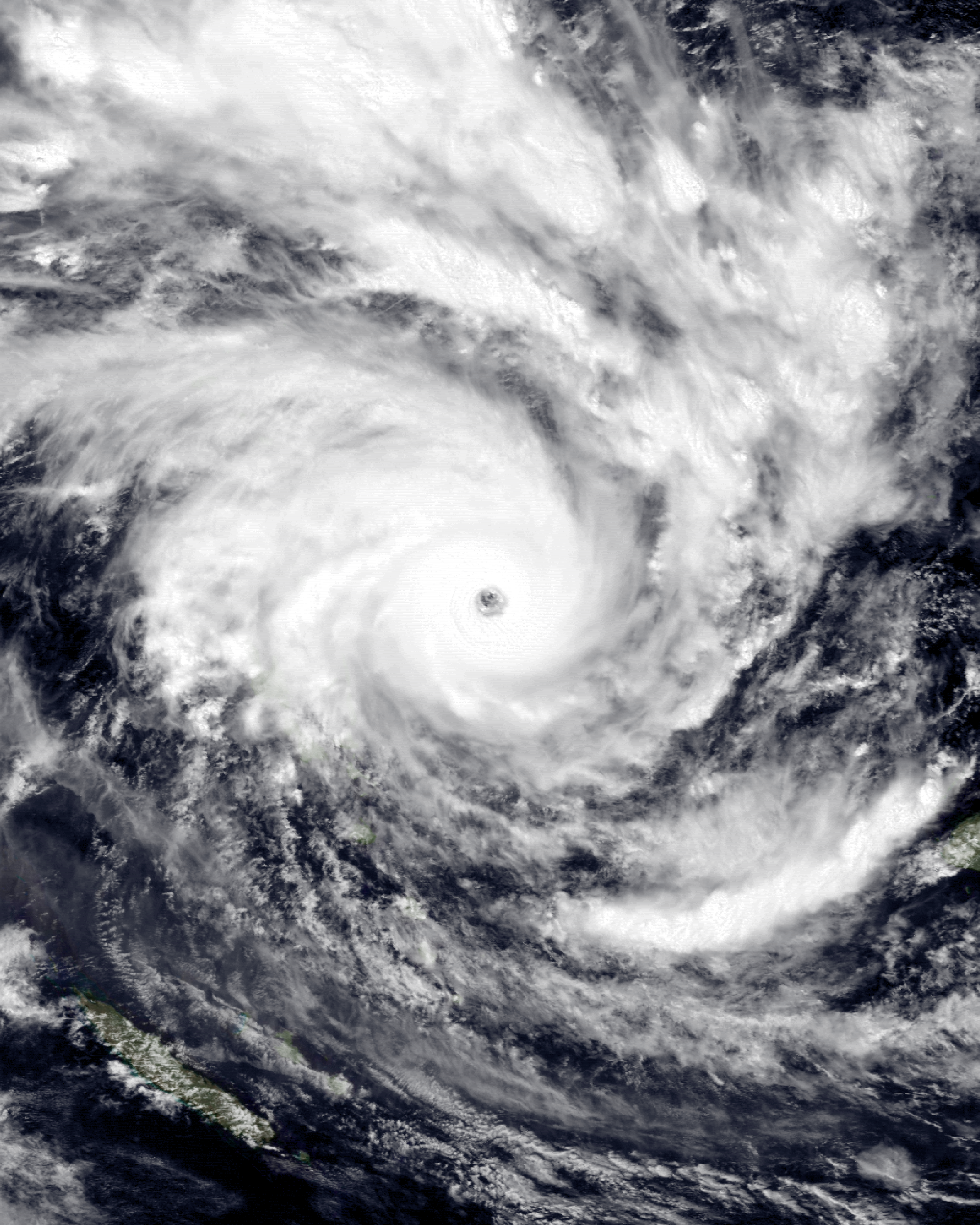
- Cyclone Susan near peak intensity east of Tuvalu on January 5

Meteorological history
- Formed: December 20, 1997
- Extratropical: January 8, 1998
- Dissipated: January 10, 1998

Category 5 severe tropical cyclone
- 10-minute sustained (FMS)
- Highest winds: 230 km/h (145 mph)
- Lowest pressure: 900 hPa (mbar); 26.58 inHg

Category 5-equivalent tropical cyclone
- 1-minute sustained (SSHWS/JTWC)
- Highest winds: 260 km/h (160 mph)
- Lowest pressure: 898 hPa (mbar); 26.52 inHg

Overall effects
- Fatalities: 1
- Damage: $10,000 (1998 USD)
- Areas affected: Solomon Islands, Vanuatu, Fiji, New Zealand
- IBTrACS
- Part of the 1997–98 South Pacific cyclone season

Severe Tropical Cyclone Susan was a powerful tropical cyclone that is one of the most intense on record within the South Pacific basin. It was first noted on December 20, 1997, as a weak tropical disturbance located to the north of American Samoa. Over the next 12 days, the disturbance remained weak while it gradually moved towards the southwest before it started to rapidly develop on January 2, 1998, while it was located near the Fijian dependency of Rotuma. The disturbance was declared a tropical cyclone later that day, but was not named Susan until the next day, after it had intensified into a category 2 tropical cyclone on the Australian Scale. Over the next few days, Susan moved towards the southwest and continued to intensify before it reached its peak intensity as a category five tropical cyclone during January 5 while it was located about 400 km (250 mi) to the northwest of Vanuatu's capital city Port Vila.

At this stage as the cyclone was moving towards the southwest it posed a severe threat to Vanuatu however, during that day Susan recurved towards the southeast and subsequently spared Vanuatu a direct hit. After sparing Vanuatu a direct hit, Susan started to accelerate towards the southeast and while starting to weaken significantly passed close enough to Fiji during January 7 and 8 to cause gale-force winds in Fiji's southern and western islands. While continuing to move towards the southeast, Susan started to interact with Severe Tropical Cyclone Ron during January 8 before it absorbed Ron by 0600 UTC the next day and starting to transition into an extratropical cyclone.

The extratropical remnants of the combined systems were then monitored for another day until they were last noted on January 10, bringing an unseasonable cold snap to New Zealand. Despite sparing Vanuatu and Fiji direct hits, heavy rain and gale-force winds associated with Susan were reported to have caused minor damage to several Vanuatuan and Fijian islands. These islands included Viti Levu where a possible tornado destroyed the roof of a shopping centre and the Vanuatuan island of Ambrym, where a woman died after being hit by a falling coconut tree, while gathering supplies to secure her house with.

== Meteorological history ==
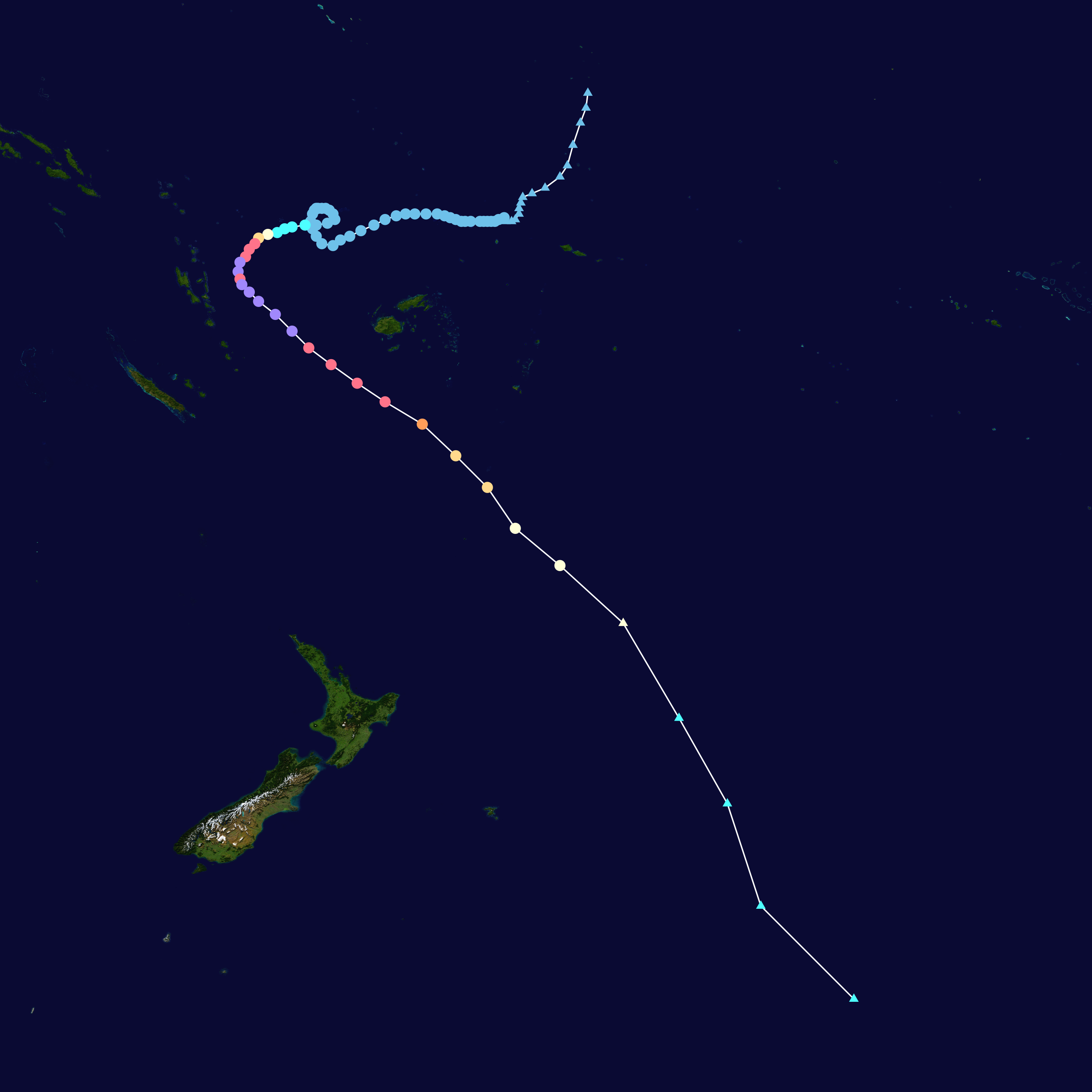
Map plotting the storm's track and intensity, according to the Saffir–Simpson scale Map key Saffir–Simpson scale Tropical depression (≤38 mph, ≤62 km/h) Tropical storm (39–73 mph, 63–118 km/h) Category 1 (74–95 mph, 119–153 km/h) Category 2 (96–110 mph, 154–177 km/h) Category 3 (111–129 mph, 178–208 km/h) Category 4 (130–156 mph, 209–251 km/h) Category 5 (≥157 mph, ≥252 km/h) Unknown Storm type Tropical cyclone Subtropical cyclone Extratropical cyclone, remnant low, tropical disturbance, or monsoon depression

On December 20, 1997, the Fiji Meteorological Service (FMS) started to monitor a weak tropical disturbance that was located about 915 km (570 mi) to the northwest of Pago Pago in American Samoa. Over the next couple of weeks, the system gradually moved towards the west-southwest, without developing into a tropical cyclone. During the opening days of January 1998, a subtropical mid-level ridge of high pressure developed to the south of the system between Fiji and Vanuatu, which provided an area of low vertical wind shear in which the disturbance could intensify. As a result, the system started to show signs of significant development while located near the Fiji dependency of Rotuma, before on January 3, the United States Joint Typhoon Warning Center (JTWC) initiated warnings on the system and designated it as Tropical Cyclone 11P. This was followed by the FMS, which reported that the system had become a Category 1 tropical cyclone, on the Australian tropical cyclone intensity scale and named it Susan.

After it had been named, Susan continued to move towards the west-southwest and started to pose a severe threat to northern Vanuatu, as it continued to rapidly intensify. It was classified as a category 3 severe tropical cyclone during January 4, as an eye appeared on satellite imagery, atmospheric convection increased and clouds tops significantly cooled. The ridge of high pressure also started to weaken as it interacted with a trough of low pressure, which meant that the cyclone started to turn towards the south-southwest.

During January 5, the FMS reported that along with Severe Tropical Cyclone Ron, Susan had become a category 5 severe tropical cyclone and that both systems had peaked with 10-minute sustained wind speeds of 230 km/h (145 mph) and a minimum pressure of 900 hPa (26.58 inHg). As a result, both systems were considered to be two of the most intense tropical cyclones, within the South Pacific basin, since Severe Tropical Cyclone Hina of 1984-85. At around the same time, the JTWC who reported that the system had peaked with 1-minute sustained wind speeds of 260 km/h (160 mph), which made it a category 5 on the Saffir-Simpson hurricane wind scale. As it peaked in intensity, Susan was located about 415 km (260 mi) to the northeast of Port Vila in Vanuatu and had started to recurve by 70 degrees towards a large weakness in the subtropical ridge.

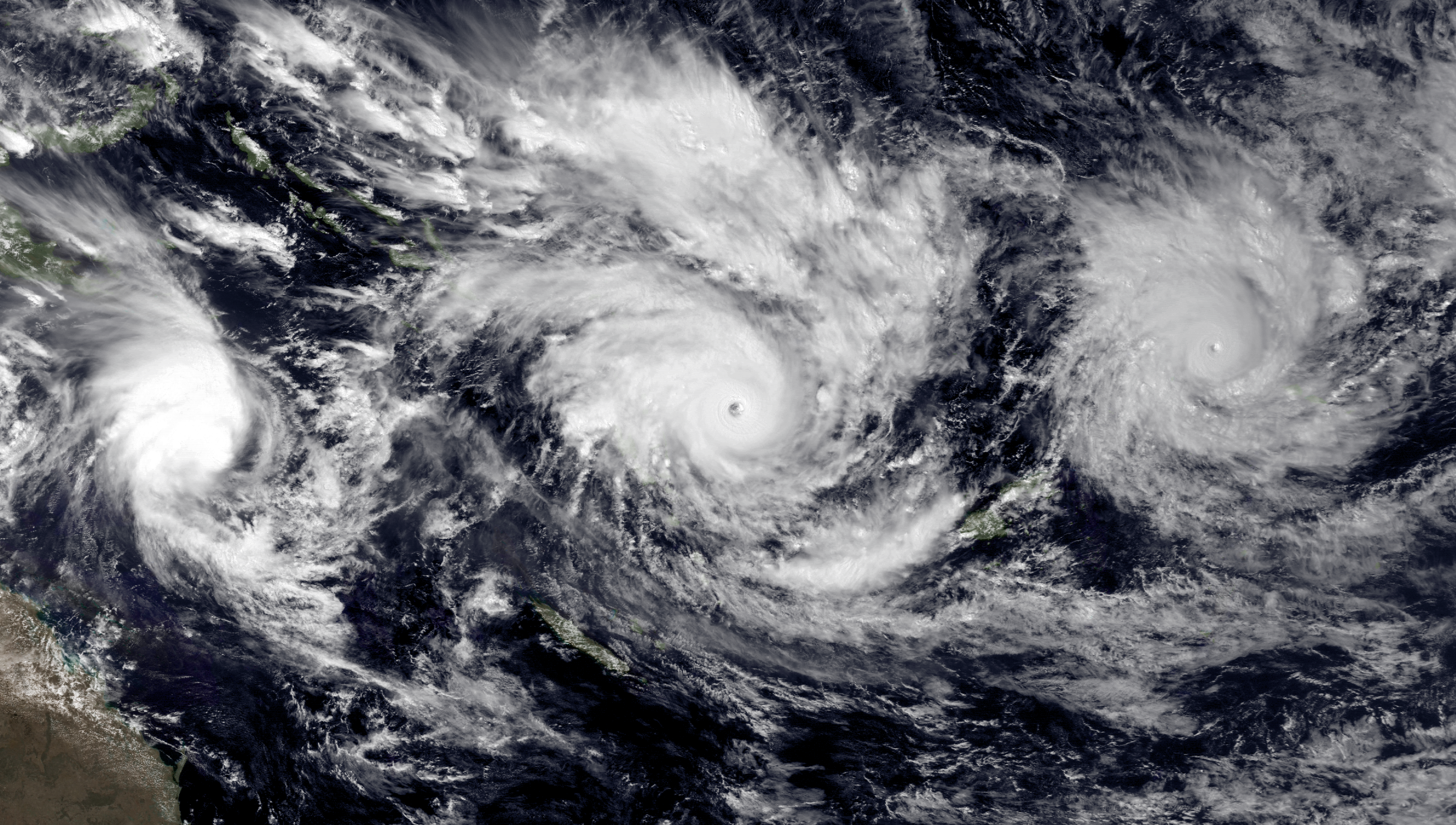
Three simultaneous tropical cyclones on January 5: Katrina (left), Susan (center) and Ron (right)

Over the next couple of days, Susan maintained its peak intensity and accelerated south-eastwards, as it came under the influence of a north-westerly steering flow, which was associated with a trough of low pressure. As a result, the system started to pose a threat to the island nation of Fiji and weaken as it interacted with cooler sea surface temperatures, cooler air and increased vertical windshear. During January 7, Susan's eye became ragged as it continued to weaken, with the FMS reporting that the system had weakened into a category 4 severe tropical cyclone. During that day, the system passed close enough to Fiji, to produce gale-force winds over several of the southern and western Fijian Islands. Susan subsequently absorbed the remnants of Severe Tropical Cyclone Ron during January 8, before it rapidly weakened and quickly transitioned into an extratropical cyclone, while it was located about 1,300 km (810 mi) to the northeast of Auckland, New Zealand. The combined system was monitored for another day, before it was last noted during January 10, bringing an unseasonable cold snap to New Zealand.

== Effects ==
Cyclone Susan caused one death and at least US$100,000 worth of damage, when it affected the Solomon Islands, Vanuatu and Fiji during January 1998. Due to the impact of this storm, the name Susan was retired from the lists of tropical cyclone names for the South Pacific. Between January 2–5, the system impacted the Solomon Islands Temotu province, where it caused damage to several food gardens and destroyed several houses.

=== Vanuatu ===
After Susan had been named on January 3, the FMS started to issue special weather bulletins for Vanuatu, which indicated that gale-force winds might impact the northern islands within the next 24-48 hours. The Vanuatu National Disaster Management Council subsequently issued various colour-coded tropical cyclone alerts which warned residents about the approaching cyclone, including a red alert for Ambae Maewo and Pentecost islands on January 5. Ahead of the cyclone impacting the island nation, ships and small boats were advised to seek safe anchorage, residents were advised to stay at home, while the domestic airline Vanair cancelled its flights and closed all of its airfields. On the island of Ambrym, a lady was killed by a falling coconut tree, as she collected fronds and tree branches to help protect her home against Susan.

Despite being spared a direct hit, heavy rain and gale-force winds caused minor damage to several Vanuatuan Islands, including on Ambrym Island, where a woman died after being hit by a falling coconut tree, while gathering supplies to secure her house with. After the alerts were cancelled on January 7, by the National Disaster Management Council, most shops and government buildings on Efate island kept their shutters up because Cyclone Katrina was predicted to directly affect the archipelago within a few days.

=== Fiji ===
Late on January 6, the FMS issued a tropical cyclone alert for Fiji, while Susan was located about 600 km (375 mi) to the west of Nadi, Fiji. The alert stated that Susan, was expected to pass as close as 300 km (185 mi) to the southwest of Viti Levu during the next day. They also warned that there was a chance that the cyclone would curve more towards the east-southeast and bring gale force or stronger winds over Fiji. Early the next day as squally strong north to north-easterly winds were starting to affect Fiji, the FMS upgraded the alert to a gale warning for Vatulele, Kadavu, western and south-western Viti Levu and the Yasawa and Mamanuca island groups. The system subsequently passed close enough to Fiji, to cause some minor coastal damage to several southern and western Fijian islands, including on the main island of Viti Levu. The cyclone also brought with it some beneficial rainfall which helped to ease the drought conditions that were present in Fiji. However, gale-force winds, high seas, a heavy swell and storm surge inundated Bequ Island and a village on Kadavu Island, while partly destroying beach-fronts, roads, jetties and bridges within the archipelago. Within Lautoka several shops, power lines, a bus station and the roof of a shopping complex were damaged after what was believed to be either a tornado or tornadic winds developed in one of Susan's rainbands as it crossed the shoreline. Firemen and linesmen from the Fiji Electricity Authority, were called in to assist police to clear downed power wires.

== See also ==
- Cyclone Ron
- List of the most intense tropical cyclones
