= Typhoon Babs =

Pacific typhoon in 1998

Typhoon Babs (Loleng)
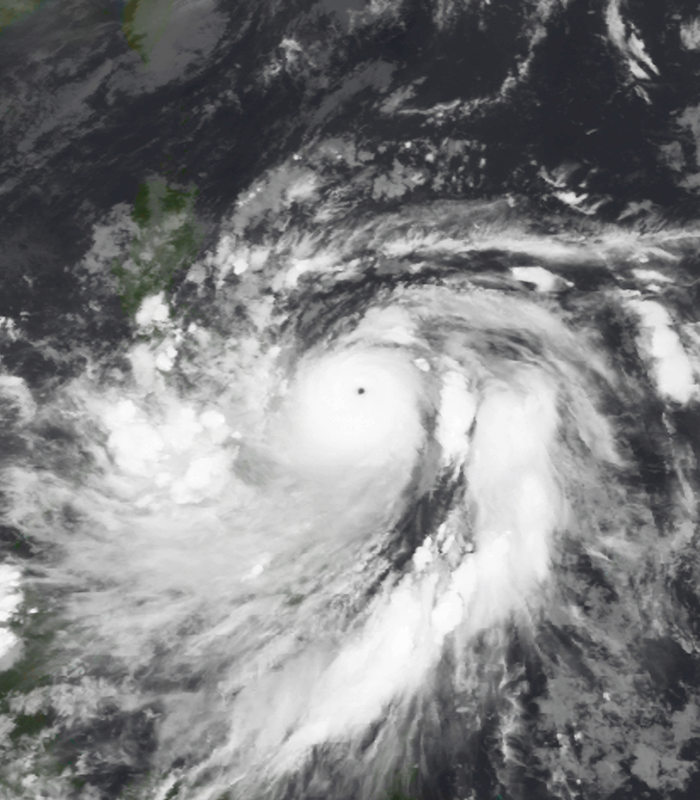
- Typhoon Babs approaching the Philippines on October 20

Meteorological history
- Formed: October 14, 1998
- Extratropical: October 27, 1998
- Dissipated: October 30, 1998

Very strong typhoon
- 10-minute sustained (JMA)
- Highest winds: 155 km/h (100 mph)
- Lowest pressure: 940 hPa (mbar); 27.76 inHg

Category 4-equivalent super typhoon
- 1-minute sustained (SSHWS/JTWC)
- Highest winds: 250 km/h (155 mph)
- Lowest pressure: 904 hPa (mbar); 26.70 inHg

Overall effects
- Fatalities: 327 total
- Missing: 29
- Damage: $203 million (1998 USD)
- Areas affected: Philippines, Taiwan, China, Japan, Russian Far East
- IBTrACS
- Part of the 1998 Pacific typhoon season

Typhoon Babs, named Loleng by PAGASA, was a powerful typhoon that struck the Philippines days after Typhoon Zeb hit the same area. The seventh typhoon of the inactive 1998 Pacific typhoon season, Babs formed on October 14 between the Philippines and Guam. The storm moved westward initially, failing to intensify initially due to the outflow from Typhoon Zeb to the northwest. Babs slowed and briefly turned to the south before advancing to the northwest, whereupon it explosively intensified into a strong typhoon. On October 20, the official Japan Meteorological Agency (JMA) estimated peak 10‑minute winds of 157 km/h (98 mph), while the unofficial Joint Typhoon Warning Center (JTWC) estimated peak 1‑minute winds of 250 km/h (155 mph), making Babs an unofficial super typhoon. The storm struck the Philippine island of Catanduanes at that intensity and weakened slightly before hitting Luzon. Babs turned northward once in the South China Sea, later weakening due to unfavorable conditions and transitioning into an extratropical cyclone on October 27 in the Taiwan Strait.

Damage was heaviest where Babs first made landfall along the Philippine island of Catanduanes. Torrential rainfall rose waters by 9 m (30 ft) along a river, which inundated houses up to their roofs. Heavy rainfall affected much of Luzon and the northern Philippines, causing widespread flooding and landslides that isolated towns. Strong winds, peaking at 260 km/h (160 mph) in Virac, Catanduanes, left widespread areas without power. There was also heavy crop damage, with 222,882 tonnes of rice destroyed. Babs damaged or destroyed 403,623 houses in the Philippines, with overall damage estimated at ₱6.787 billion (Philippine peso, $159 million United States dollars); the typhoon also killed 303 people. Later, the storm's high waves injured surfers in Hong Kong. Heavy rainfall affected Fujian, causing ¥280 million (Chinese yuan, US$58 million) in damage and five deaths. Torrential rainfall in Taiwan, reaching 1,306 mm (51.4 in) in Yilan City, flooded towns and caused landslides; there were three deaths on the island. The remnants later affected the Japanese island of Okinawa with rainfall and high waves.

== Meteorological history ==
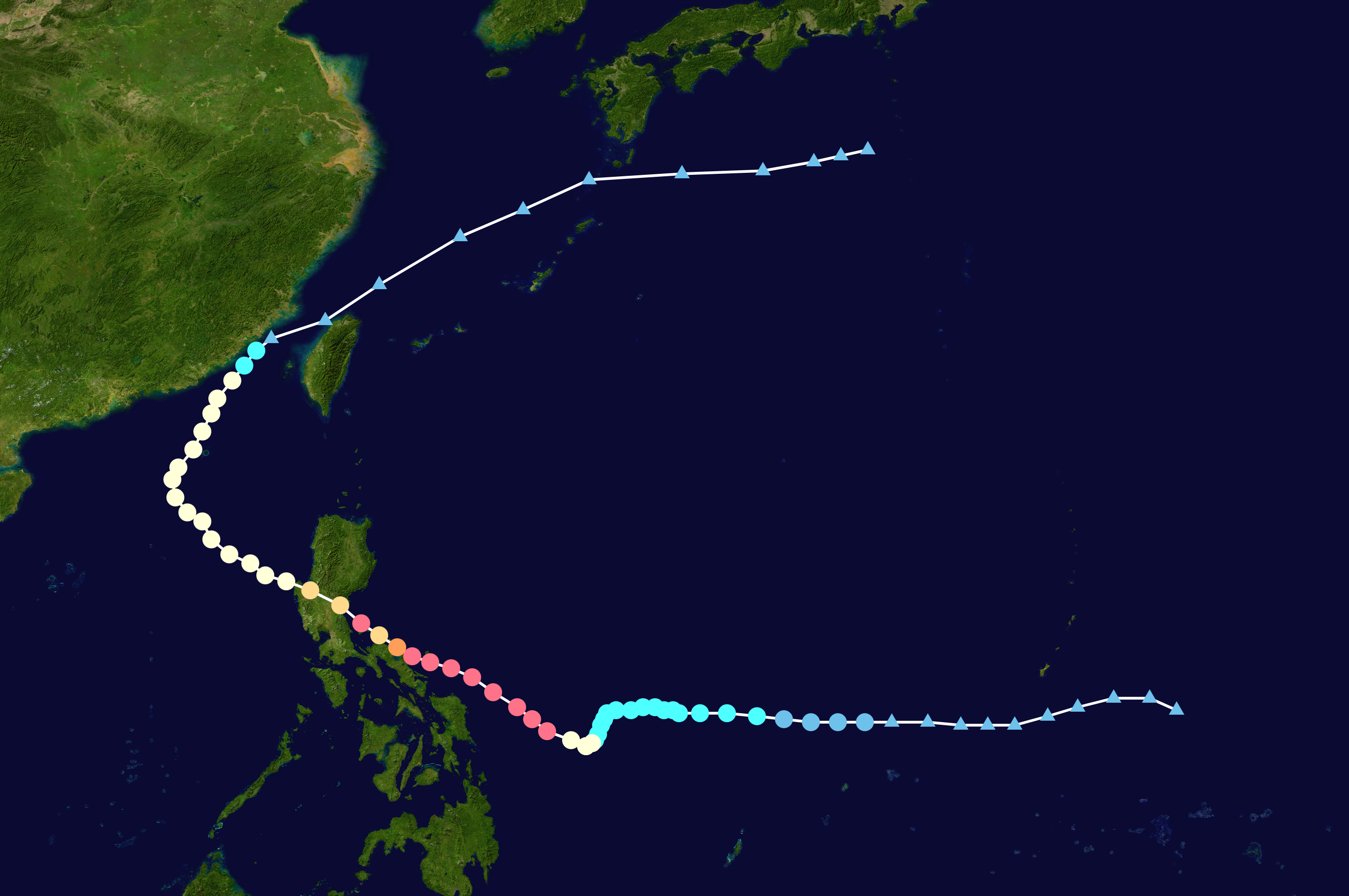
Map plotting the storm's track and intensity, according to the Saffir–Simpson scale Map key Saffir–Simpson scale Tropical depression (≤38 mph, ≤62 km/h) Tropical storm (39–73 mph, 63–118 km/h) Category 1 (74–95 mph, 119–153 km/h) Category 2 (96–110 mph, 154–177 km/h) Category 3 (111–129 mph, 178–208 km/h) Category 4 (130–156 mph, 209–251 km/h) Category 5 (≥157 mph, ≥252 km/h) Unknown Storm type Tropical cyclone Subtropical cyclone Extratropical cyclone, remnant low, tropical disturbance, or monsoon depression

A tropical disturbance developed east-southeast of Guam on October 11, just four days after Typhoon Zeb originated in the same area. The American-based Joint Typhoon Warning Center (JTWC) issued a tropical cyclone formation alert on October 12, indicating development was imminent. However, the system did not develop into a tropical depression until 06:00 UTC on October 14, based on analysis from the Japan Meteorological Agency – the official warning center for the western Pacific Ocean. Three hours later, the JTWC began tracking the system as Tropical Depression 20W. At that time, the storm had moved south of Guam and was passing north of Palau.

The nascent depression moved generally westward toward the Philippines. Initially, development was hindered by the outflow from Typhoon Zeb, which had struck Luzon and was moving northward. However, the depression was able to intensify into a tropical storm on October 15, at which time the JTWC named it Babs. Later that day, the storm reached 1‑minute winds of 85 km/h (53 mph), and it entered the area of responsibility of PAGASA – the Philippine weather agency – which gave it the local name Loleng. On October 17, a tropical upper tropospheric trough to the northeast weakened the subtropical ridge, causing Babs to slow and drift to the south; the same trough restricted outflow, causing the circulation to become exposed from the convection. The trough weakened and the shear decreased on October 18, allowing the storm to restrengthen. On October 19, a ship in the proximity of Babs reported 10‑minute winds of 96 km/h (60 mph), indicating that the storm was intensifying. At 00:00 UTC that day, the JTWC upgraded the storm to typhoon status, and the JMA followed suit 18 hours later. Babs explosively intensified subsequently as it developed a well-defined eye 15 km (9.3 mi) in diameter. At 12:00 UTC on October 20, the JMA assessed that the typhoon reached peak 10‑minute winds of 155 km/h (95 mph), while the JTWC estimated peak 1‑minute winds of 250 km/h (155 mph) with a minimum barometric pressure of 904 mbar (26.7 inHg), making Babs an unofficial super typhoon. The gale-force winds extended 335 km (208 mi) northeast from the center, while the strongest winds extended 75 km (47 mi) from the eye. Around the time of peak intensity, Babs made landfall on the Philippine island of Catanduanes, where a weather station recorded a pressure of 928 mbar (27.4 inHg) in Virac. However, the official lowest pressure from the JMA was 940 mbar (28 inHg).

The winds decreased slightly as Babs moved across Catanduanes, although it soon moved over open waters into Lamon Bay, where it struck Polillo Island. According to the JTWC, Babs had weakened to winds of 175 km/h (109 mph) on October 22 before quickly re-intensifying to winds of 215 km/h (134 mph) as it approached Luzon. At 18:00 UTC on October 22, Babs made landfall on Luzon about 45 km (28 mi) south of Baler, or 185 km (115 mi) south of where Zeb struck only eight days prior. The typhoon weakened further while crossing central Luzon, and it passed about 75 km (47 mi) north of Metro Manila before emerging into the South China Sea on October 23. By that time, the JMA had downgraded Babs to a tropical storm, although the agency soon re-upgraded the storm to typhoon status. For several days, Babs remained at the same intensity, sporting an eye with a wide area of gale-force winds. A trough gradually steered the storm toward the north, weakening the ridge. The same trough caused an increase in wind shear that led to Babs weakening. The storm reached its westernmost point on October 25 – about 275 km (171 mi) southeast of Hong Kong. Turning northeastward into the Taiwan Strait, even stronger wind shear caused Babs to fall apart, and the storm weakened into a tropical depression just off the southeast coast of China. On October 27, the JMA declared Babs as extratropical. The remnants accelerated to the northeast, passing south of Kyushu before dissipating on October 30.

== Preparations ==
Shortly after Babs entered the PAGASA area of responsibility, government workers began closely tracking the storm and warned residents to be prepared. PAGASA issued a Public Storm Warning Signal #4 for Catanduanes, with lower warnings issued throughout Luzon and the Visayas. Metro Manila was placed under Public Storm Warning Signal #3 on October 22. In Catanduanes, evacuees utilized public schools as an emergency shelter, although many rode out the storm in their homes. The storm halted ferry service throughout the region, stranding thousands. Many residents in Samar slept in buses and cars for two days due to the cancellations. Bus service to the region was also halted. The stock and currency exchanges were closed during the storm. Officials advised residents in Metro Manila to remain indoors; government buildings and schools were closed, while Ninoy Aquino International Airport halted all domestic flights. In addition, 14 international flights were canceled. Manila South Harbor also kept all boats at port. Across the Philippines, Babs forced about 400,000 people to leave their houses. Many families waited to evacuate until the onslaught of the strongest winds, resulting in additional casualties.

The Hong Kong Observatory issued a warning signal #3 due to the storm's threat to the territory on October 24. Beaches closed during the storms, and fishing boats were forced to remain at port. Several airports in Taiwan were closed. Two Russian ships were forced to ride out the storm in Xiamen.

== Impact ==
=== Philippines ===
When Babs moved over Catanduanes, the weather station at Virac recorded wind gusts of 260 km/h (160 mph). In Daet, Camarines Norte, near the typhoon's final Philippine landfall, sustained winds reached 129 km/h (80 mph), with gusts to 185 km/h (115 mph). Farther north in Luzon, Babs produced gusts of 192 km/h (119 mph) in Baler, Aurora. The typhoon also dropped torrential rainfall that caused flooding and landslides. On Mount Pinatubo, the rains resulted in a 1.5 m (4.9 ft) high landslide consisting of volcanic material, although nearby rivers at flood stage contained it. Workers at the Ambuklao and Binga dams had to release waters after the storm, which flooded rice fields and fish ponds along the Agno River. Elsewhere, heightened rivers in Camarines Sur flooded 24 towns. Five towns in Rizal province were flooded along a lake, including about 70% of the city of Angono. Flooding also affected portions of Manila.

Just like Typhoon Zeb days earlier, Babs was very destructive to the Philippines, mostly throughout Luzon and into the Visayas. In Catanduanes where it first struck, several hours of torrential rainfall in the hills caused the Bato River to rise 9 m (30 ft), which reached as high as the houses' roofs in some areas. Most houses lost their roofs and many had damage to walls, with furniture and other property drenched. About 80% of the buildings in the city of Virac were destroyed, and winds were strong enough to knock air conditioners out of windows. There was an island-wide power outage after high seas washed away a power generating barge. On Masbate, a landslide collapsed the entrance of a gold mining cave, with 14 of the 25 member crew rescued. High waves destroyed 125 homes in Catbalogan on Samar Island, while three fishermen required rescue.

Along its path through the Philippines, the high winds caused widespread power outages for several days. Many roads and highways were flooded for days or blocked by landslides, and several bridges were wrecked. In the Bicol Region of southern Luzon, the storm knocked over many coconut trees, and flooding damaged about 88,000 ha (220,000 acres) of rice fields in Nueva Ecija. Nationwide, the storm destroyed 222,882 tonnes of rice. Agriculture damage was estimated at ₱2.3 billion (Philippine pesos, $54 million United States dollars). Overall, Babs destroyed 96,581 houses and damaged another 307,042, leaving about 130,000 people homeless. There were 303 deaths in the country with another 751 injured, mostly in the Bicol Region. This included 71 deaths in Catanduanes and 41 in Camarines Sur. Most of the deaths were related to landslides, flooding, electrocutions, snakebites, and cleanup accidents. In Catanduanes, residents dug mass graves due to the high number of fatalities. Total damage was estimated at ₱6.787 billion (PHP, US$159 million), which as of 2011 was the 9th costliest typhoon in the Philippines and the 5th costliest at the time.

=== Elsewhere ===
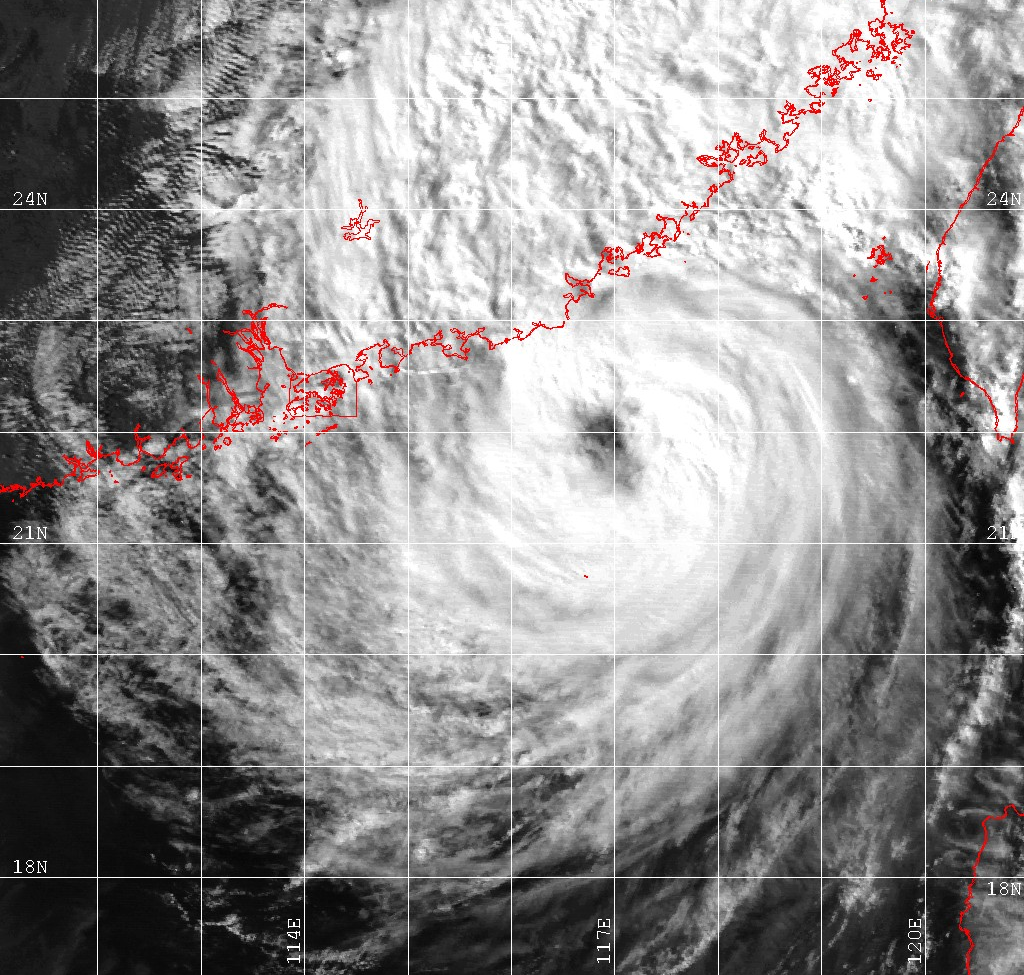
Satellite image of Typhoon Babs in the South China Sea

Due to the interaction between the monsoon and the storm, Babs produced gusty winds across Hong Kong, with a peak gust of 121 km/h (75 mph) recorded at two locations. The mountainous peak of Tate's Cairn recorded the highest sustained wind of 87 km/h (54 mph). The winds were strong enough to knock down trees and damage scaffolding. Beaches were closed during the storm's passage, and boats rode out the storm at port. Precipitation from the typhoon fell over three days, reaching 85 mm (3.3 in). Five surfers required rescues amid high seas, with a peak storm surge of 0.91 m (3.0 ft). There were 14 injuries related to Babs in the territory.

The dissipating remnants of Babs interacted with the winter monsoon to drop heavy rainfall on Taiwan, particularly in the northern and eastern portions of the island. Yilan City recorded 1,306 mm (51.4 in) over three days, and Hualien City recorded 949 mm (37.4 in). One station recorded 508 mm (20.0 in) of rainfall in 24 hours. This led to flooding in eastern Taiwan, reaching waist-deep heights in some locations, which forced hundreds to leave their home. The rains also caused landslides that isolated villages, and a swollen Keelung River cut off two towns east of Taipei. The storm killed three people on the island, including a fishermen swept away by high waves, and a couple buried under a landslide.

Across the Taiwan Strait, Babs killed five people and injured three others in the Chinese province of Fujian. In Zhangzhou, the storm damaged or destroyed 124 boats. Heavy rainfall destroyed 1,461 homes or greenhouses, with damage estimated at ¥280 million (Chinese yuan, US$58 million). Damage was concentrated in Fujian, with little effects reported in neighboring Jiangxi or Guangdong. The remnants also brought rainfall to southern Japan, including Okinawa, where precipitation reached 172 mm (6.8 in) in Yonagunijima. The same station recorded winds of 43 km/h (27 mph). High waves flooded a portion of Route 58 on Okinawa, damaging three vehicles and flooding 28 buildings. The storm also caused one landslide on the island.

== Aftermath ==
A few days after Babs struck the Philippines, then-Philippine president Joseph Estrada declared four provinces as a state of calamity and ordered the release of ₱200 million (PHP) in emergency funds. Estrada later released an additional ₱50 million (PHP) specifically for Catanduanes, as well as ₱10,000 sent to the family of each storm fatality. The Philippine Navy sent rubber boats to Bato, Catanduanes to help with relief there. The president ordered agencies to work together to respond to the disaster and for his Trade Secretary to watch for price gouging. However, food prices tripled following Babs and Zeb, especially after roads were blocked from agriculture areas, and ferries from unaffected areas were unable to travel due to the storm.

After Babs passed the hardest hit areas, workers were initially unable to distribute food and medicine due to ferry service being halted. Many provinces and islands were isolated after the storm, necessitating helicopter travel to be reached by national aid workers. The Department of Public Works and Highways worked quickly to clear the landslides and reopen closed roads. The country's National Food Authority provided about 73,000 sacks of rice to storm victims, and the country planned to import 300,000 tonnes of rice to overcome the lost crops. The Philippine Red Cross deployed search and rescue teams, as well as distributing food and coffee to 35,500 people. The International Red Cross and Red Crescent Movement launched a global request for assistance worth about $2.2 million to help 240,000 people.

== See also ==
- Tropical cyclones in 1998
- Typhoon Irma (1981)
- Typhoon Vera (1983)
- Typhoon Ruby (1988)
- Typhoon Nanmadol (2004)
- Typhoon Rammasun (2014)
- Typhoon Vamco (2020)
- Typhoon Man-yi (2024)
- Typhoon Fung-wong (2025)
