= Cyclone Ron =

South Pacific cyclone in 1998

Severe Tropical Cyclone Ron
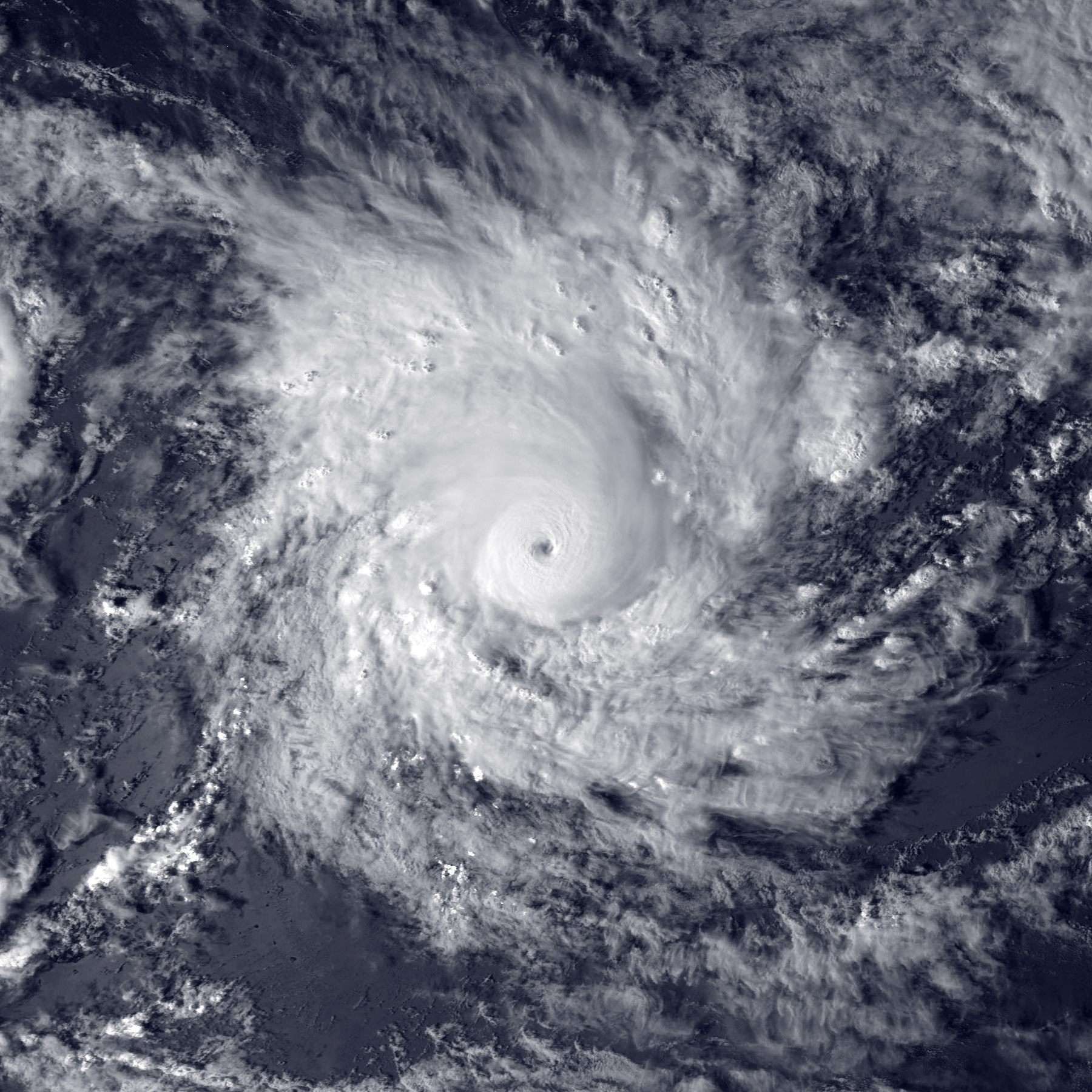
- Cyclone Ron near peak intensity after recurving towards Tonga on January 5

Meteorological history
- Formed: January 1, 1998
- Dissipated: January 9, 1998

Category 5 severe tropical cyclone
- 10-minute sustained (FMS)
- Highest winds: 230 km/h (145 mph)
- Lowest pressure: 900 hPa (mbar); 26.58 inHg

Category 5-equivalent tropical cyclone
- 1-minute sustained (SSHWS/NPMOC)
- Highest winds: 270 km/h (165 mph)
- Lowest pressure: 892 hPa (mbar); 26.34 inHg

Overall effects
- Fatalities: None
- Damage: $737,000 (1998 USD)
- Areas affected: Samoan Islands, Tonga, Wallis and Futuna
- IBTrACS
- Part of the 1997–98 South Pacific cyclone season

Severe Tropical Cyclone Ron was a powerful tropical cyclone that became the strongest on record to impact Tonga. The system was first noted as a tropical depression, to the northeast of Samoa on January 1, 1998. Over the next day the system gradually developed further and was named Ron as it developed into a Category 1 tropical cyclone on the Australian tropical cyclone intensity scale during the next day. The system subsequently continued to move south-westwards and became a Category 3 severe tropical cyclone, as it passed near Swains Island during January 3.

Intensification proceeded at a fairly rapid rate. Ron reached the peak intensity of 145 mph (225 km/h) on January 5, becoming one of the most intense cyclones in the Southern hemisphere in that decade, when Ron was at north-northwest of Apia, Samoa, three days after initial development. The cyclone maintained this strength for about 36 hours, while re-curving to the south-southeast. Then, Ron started weakening while passing between central Tonga and Niue on January 7. Finally, by January 9, Ron was absorbed by the much larger circulation of Severe Tropical Cyclone Susan.

== Meteorological history ==
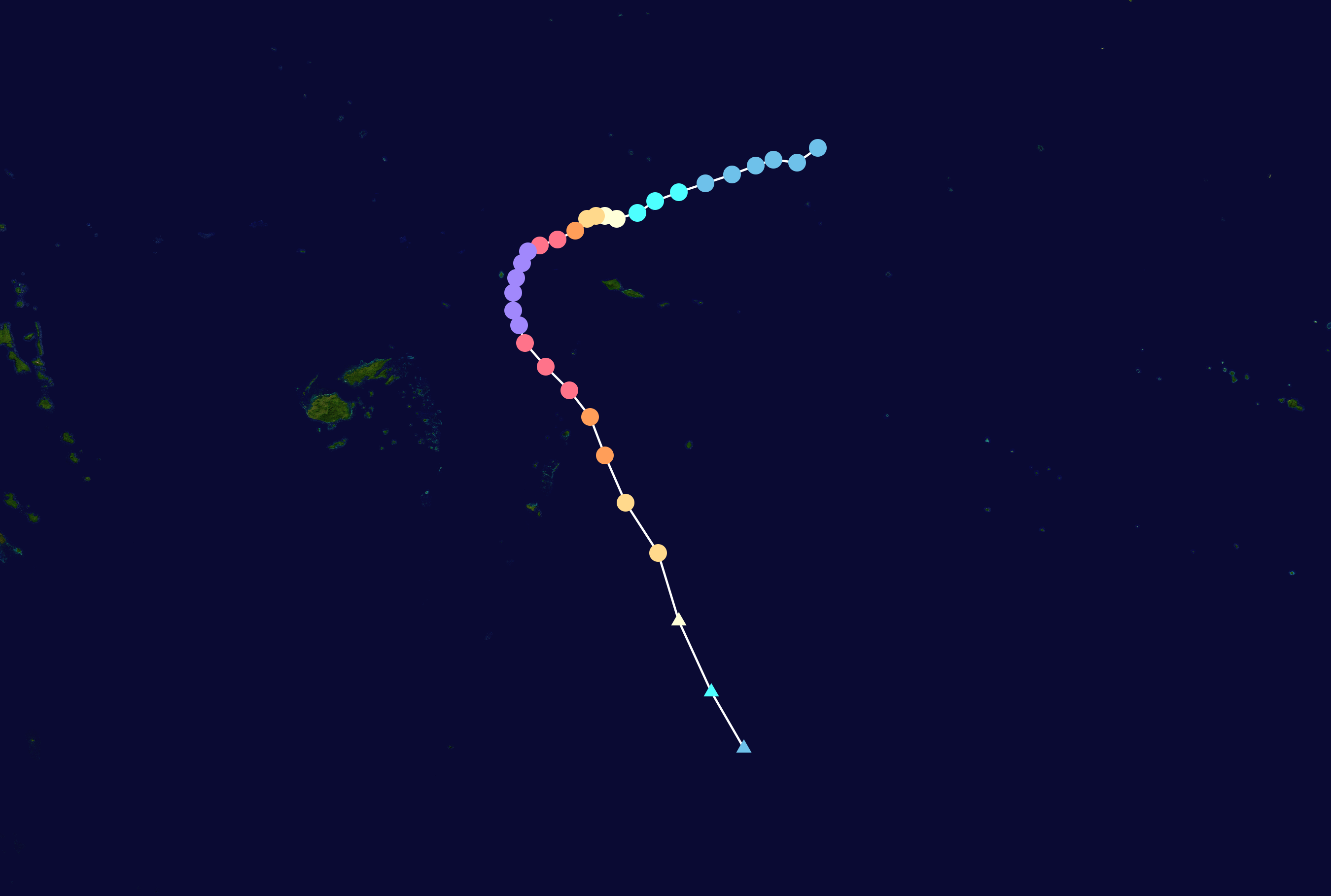
Map plotting the storm's track and intensity, according to the Saffir–Simpson scale Map key Saffir–Simpson scale Tropical depression (≤38 mph, ≤62 km/h) Tropical storm (39–73 mph, 63–118 km/h) Category 1 (74–95 mph, 119–153 km/h) Category 2 (96–110 mph, 154–177 km/h) Category 3 (111–129 mph, 178–208 km/h) Category 4 (130–156 mph, 209–251 km/h) Category 5 (≥157 mph, ≥252 km/h) Unknown Storm type Tropical cyclone Subtropical cyclone Extratropical cyclone, remnant low, tropical disturbance, or monsoon depression

Towards the end of December 1997, an area of low pressure developed within the South Pacific Convergence Zone to the northwest of the Cook Islands. Over the next few days, the system gradually developed further, before it was classified as a tropical depression by the Fiji Meteorological Service (FMS) during January 1, 1998. The system subsequently moved south-westwards under the influence of an area of high pressure and gradually developed further as its organisation and outflow improved. During the next day the FMS reported that the system had developed into a Category 1 Tropical Cyclone, on the Australian Tropical Cyclone Intensity Scale and named it Ron. At around the same time the Naval Pacific Meteorology and Oceanography Center initiated advisories on the system, and designated it as Tropical Cyclone 10P with 1-minute wind speeds of 65 km/h (40 mph). During that day the system continued to move south-westwards and gradually organized further and became a Category 3 Severe Tropical Cyclone during January 3, as it passed about 20 km (10 mi) to the north of Swains Island.

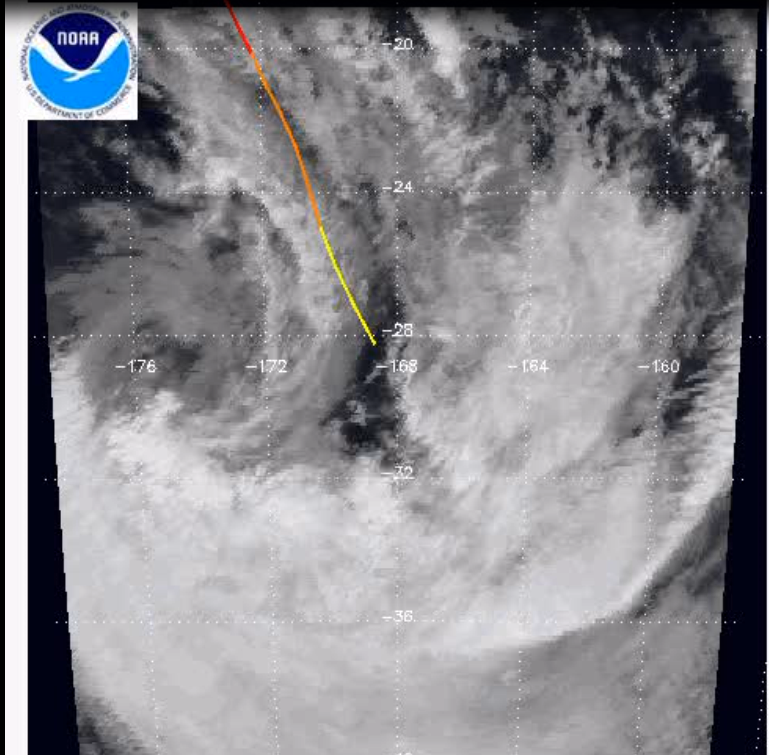
Cyclone Ron being absorbed by Cyclone Susan

After passing to the north of Swains Island, Ron continued to intensify and developed an eye as it moved south-westwards, before RSMC Nadi reported that it had become a Category 5 Severe Tropical Cyclone at 00:00 UTC on January 5. RSMC Nadi subsequently reported six hours later that the system had peaked with estimated 10-minute sustained wind-speeds of 145 mph (225 km/h) and an estimated minimum pressure of 900 hPa (26.58 inHg). At this time the system was located to the northeast of Wallis Island and was thought to be the strongest tropical cyclone in the South Pacific Basin since Severe Tropical Cyclone Hina of the 1984-85 season. The NPMOC subsequently reported that the system had peaked as a category 5 hurricane on the Saffir–Simpson hurricane wind scale, with 1-minute sustained wind speeds of 165 mph (270 km/h) and an estimated minimum pressure of 892 hPa (26.34 inHg).

As the system peaked in intensity during January 5, the system recurved towards the southeast and passed about 55 km (35 mi) to the east of Wallis Island. During the next day Ron remained at it peak intensity before it passed, about 30 km (20 mi) to the east of the Tongan island of Niuafo'ou. During January 7, the system started to weaken as it accelerated southeastwards, and passed in between the main Tongan islands and Niue. The system subsequently moved below 25S and left the tropics during the next day, before Ron was last noted being absorbed by Severe Tropical Cyclone Susan during January 9. After absorbing Ron, Susan transitioned into an extra-tropical cyclone, before it was last noted during January 10, bringing an unseasonable cold snap to New Zealand.

== Preparations and impact ==
Severe Tropical Cyclone Ron caused no deaths and various levels of damage, as it affected Swains Island, Wallis and Futuna and Tonga, while the name Ron was retired from the Lists of tropical cyclone names for the region due to the impact of this system.

=== Samoa ===
At around 00:00 UTC on January 3 (13:00 SST, January 2), Ron passed just to the north of Swains Island, where a professional fisherman estimated that sustained winds of about 130–145 km/h (80–90 mph) occurred. As a result, the majority of houses were destroyed, while no deaths and a few minor injuries were reported after residents sheltered in a concrete building. Elsewhere in Samoa, there were no injuries or damages reported, while a peak wind gust of 60 km/h (37 mph) and a rainfall total of 64 mm (2.51 in) were recorded at the Weather Service Office in Tafuna.

=== Wallis and Futuna ===
The system became the fourth and final tropical cyclone to affect the French territory of Wallis and Futuna during 1997 and 1998, after cyclones Gavin, Hina and Keli had affected the islands. Ahead of the system affecting the islands between January 4–6, residents were put on maximum alert for the system by the local disaster management centre. As a result, residents were urged to stock up with food and water, while a crisis centre was set up in the capital Mata-Utu and Air Calédonie cancelled flights to the islands. On the island of Wallis winds of up to 130 km/h (80 mph), and a rainfall total of 109 mm (4.3 in) were recorded in the Hihifo District on January 6. Widespread damage to roofs, trees, coastal roads, fales and food crops were recorded while water, electricity supplies and communication network were also disrupted. Residents of the island of Futuna evacuated inland and sought higher ground as tidal waves of between 7–9 metres (23–30 ft) affected the island.

=== Niue ===
Ron was the first tropical cyclone to prompt the FMS to issue a gale warning for Niue, since Cyclone Ofa impacted the island in February 1990. The system passed about 325 km (200 mi) to the west of Niue at around 19:00 UTC (07:00 Niue Time) on January 7, where intermittent showers, average winds of 35 km/h (20 mph), a minimum pressure of 1005 hPa (29.68 inHg) were recorded.

=== Tonga ===
After affecting both Wallis and Futuna and Swains Island, the system became the strongest tropical cyclone on record in Tonga, as it passed near Niuafo'ou at peak intensity. The system was the third tropical cyclone to affect the island nation in 10 months, after cyclones Hina and Keli affected the islands in March and June 1997, respectively. Ahead of the system affecting the islands tropical cyclone alerts and warnings were issued for the whole nation by the Tonga Meteorological Department. The worst affected Tongan island was Niuafo'ou where considerable damage occurred, while some damage was reported on other islands including Niuatoputapu, Tafahi, and Vava'u.

On the island of Niuafo'ou sustained winds of 110 km/h (70 mph) were reported, while it was estimated that winds on the island had peaked at between 125–145 km/h (80–90 mph). During the system's aftermath, a survey team was sent to Niuafoou, Niuatoputapu and Tafahi to assess the damage and the impact of the cyclone on the inhabitants. According to the report made by them, the cyclone left 99 families without home and 43 ones in need of tarpaulins to repair damages, most of them in the Niuafo'ou island. Also, Ron's winds caused extensive damage to agriculture and vegetation of the islands, in which includes total loss of fruit and breadfruit trees and severe damage to cassava and banana crops.

== Aftermath and records ==
Ron's destructive winds caused severe damage in Tonga's sanitation systems, increasing the danger of an outbreak of infectious diseases. Approximately 30% of the water tanks and 95% of the catchment covers had been damaged, leading to a water shortage. Also, according to Tonga's National Disaster Relief Committee, the great loss of plantations and vegetation led to a six-month food shortage. Replanting programmes took up to 6–8 months to restore all the lost vegetation.

Several governments and organizations assisted the people affected by Ron. The Office for the Coordination of Humanitarian Affairs as allocated an Emergency Cash Grant of US$20,000 of relief items and coverage of transportation costs. The Government of New Zealand has provided temporary shelters and assistance with repairs to Government and public health buildings, as well as assistance with replanting with a total value of NZ$36,500 (approximately US$21,340). The United Kingdom provided supplies for the repair of water and sanitary systems of a total value of approximately £15,000 (US$25,000). The South Pacific Forum Secretariat in Fiji also helped Tonga, releasing US$10,000 from a special disaster fund.

== See also ==
- Cyclone Susan
- List of the most intense tropical cyclones
