= B. V. Raju Institute of Technology =

Engineering college in Telangana, India

B.V. Raju Institute of Technology
- Other name: BVRIT
- Motto: Sky is the Limit
- Type: Educational and Research Institution
- Established: 1997
- Founder: Padma Bhushan Dr. BV Raju
- Chairman: Raju
- Undergraduates: 3300+
- Postgraduates: 300+
- Location: Narsapur, Medak, Telangana; 17.7252635°N 78.2549624°E
- Campus: Rural, spread over 110 acres.
- Website: Official website
- Location within Telangana Location within India

B.V. Raju Institute of Technology (BVRIT) is an engineering college established in 1997 in Narsapur, Medak, Telangana State, India. BVRIT is affiliated with Jawaharlal Nehru Technological University, Hyderabad (JNTUH), University Grants Commission (India) (UGC Autonomous), accredited by the National Board of Accreditation (NBA) and National Assessment and Accreditation Council (NAAC). It is one of the educational institutes of the Sri Vishnu Educational Society. The founding chairman of the Sri Vishnu Educational Society is Padmabhushan Dr BV Raju and current chairman is Sri K V Vishnu Raju, CMD, Anjani Portland Cements.

== History ==
Padmabhushan Dr. Bhupathiraju Vissam Raju (Padmabhushan Dr. B. V. Raju) is the founder and chairman of the Dr. B.V. Raju Foundation and the B.V. Raju Institute of Technology. Three campuses have been established: one at Narasapur in Medak (Dist) in 1997, where an engineering college has been set up called B.V. Raju Institute of Technology, the second one at Bhimavaram which includes a pharmacy school, a computer programming department, an engineering school for women and a dental college and the other one at Rajiv Gandhi Nagar Colony, near Bachupally in 2012, where an engineering college has been setup in the name BVRITH College of Engineering for Women.

On 27 November 2004, the government of Andhra Pradesh established its first District Knowledge Center (DKC), also called Jawahar Knowledge Center(JKC) under the campus placement mission. It is governed by the Institute of Electronic Governance at the college campus and was inaugurated by the then chief minister Dr. Y. S. Raja Sekhara Reddy. The college JKC has been awarded the Best JKC for the year 2007.

== Campus ==
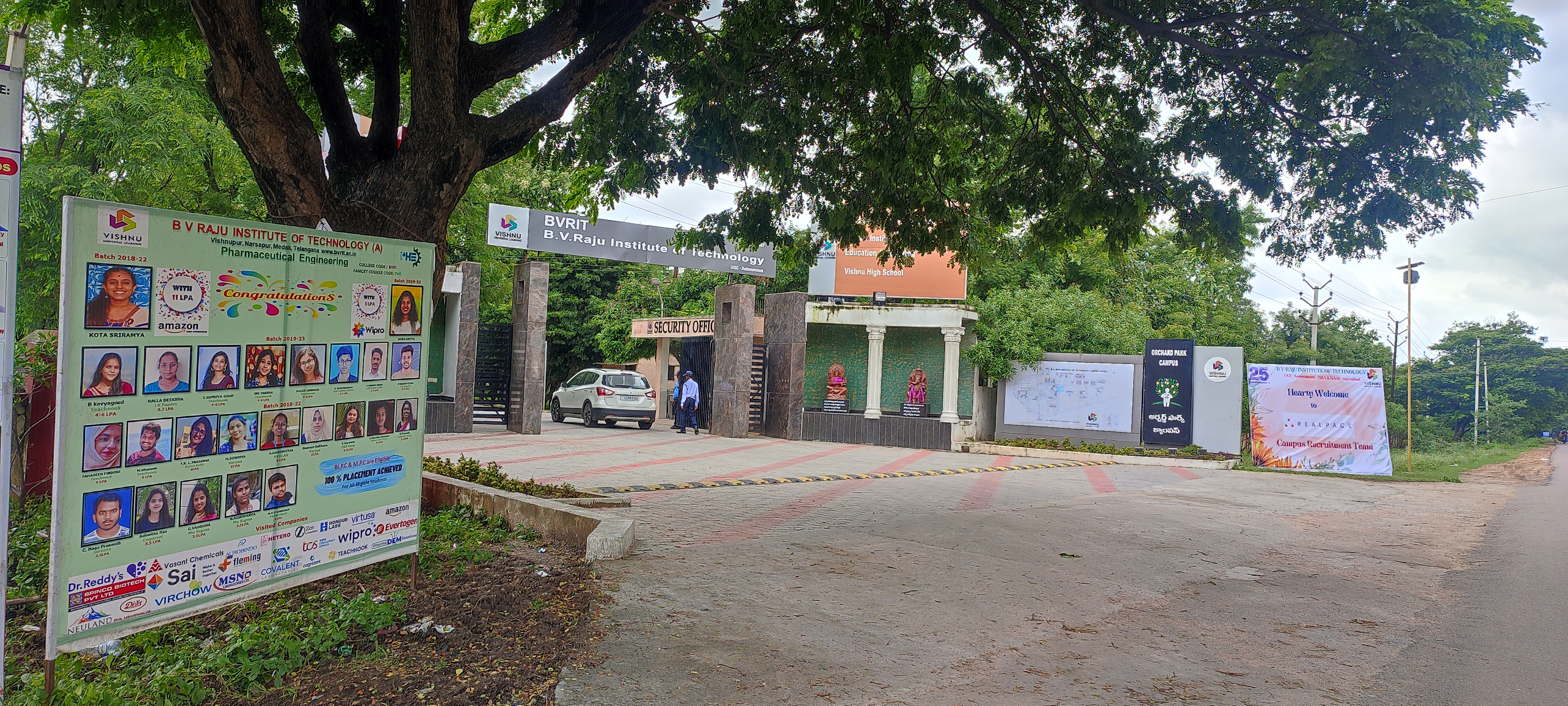
BVRIT College Entrance Gate

The campus is located 3 km from Narsapur and 50 km from Hyderabad and covers 110 acres (0.45 km^{2}). The campus has three blocks : Main (or APJ Abdul Kalam), Eastern (or Visvesvarayya) and Western (or Arya Bhatta).

=== Academic programmes ===
Undergraduate courses

- Biomedical engineering
- Chemical engineering
- Computer Science and Engineering
- Information Technology
- Electronics and Communications Engineering
- Electrical and Electronics Engineering
- Mechanical Engineering
- Civil Engineering
- Pharmaceutical Engineering

Postgraduate courses

- Master of Business Administration (MBA)
- Master of Computer Applications (MCA)
- VLSI System Design
- Embedded systems
- Computer Science & Engineering
- Software Engineering
- Chemical Engineering
- Electrical Power Systems
- Power Engineering & Energy Systems
- Engineering Design
- Pharmaceutical Engineering

=== Library ===
The central library covers 706 square metres and has a seating capacity of around 140. It has around 3,000 titles and 29,000 volumes. The college is a member of Sonnet, an A.P. Government "Society for networking for excellence in Technical education", and receives 230 online journals from Sonnet. BVRIT has access to its subscribed 12 international journals and 89 Indian journals and an electronic library where students can access books and journals from e-publications.

In 2001 the college started a Book Bank Scheme offering a complete set of text books to each student for the entire semester or academic year at a nominal rent.

=== Facilities ===
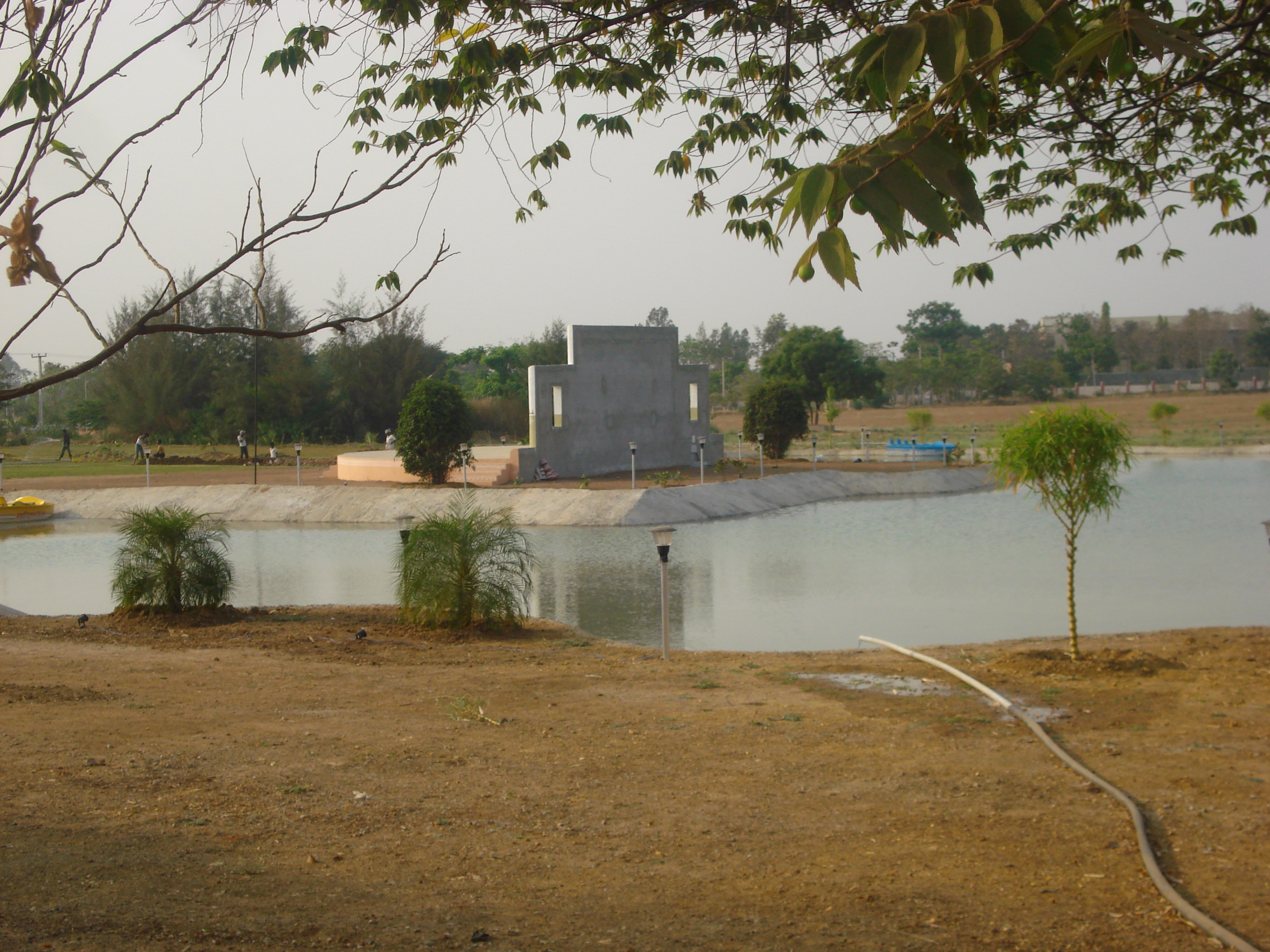
lake

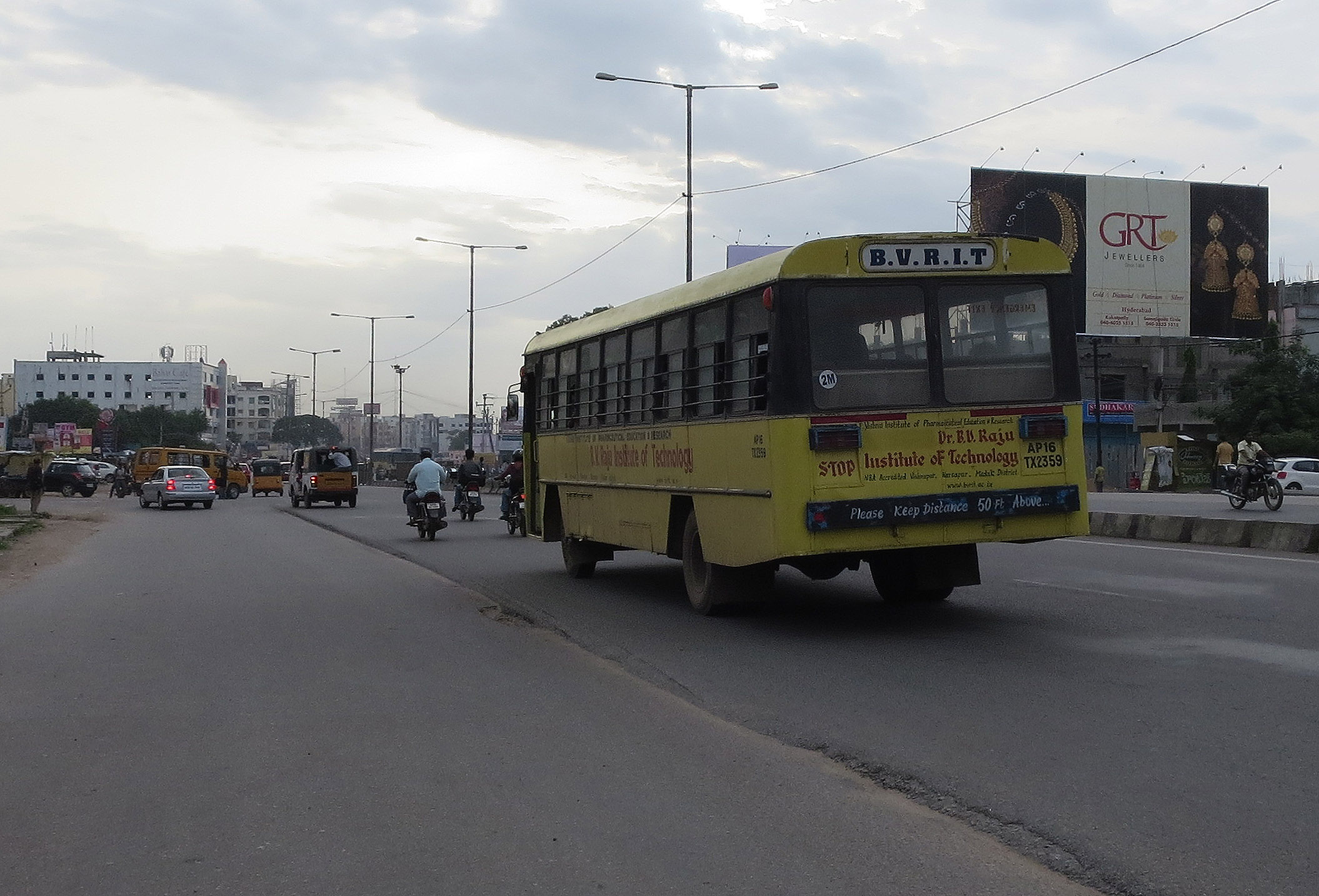
One of the college buses belonging to Dr. BVR Institute of Technology

Students can stay in the campus, where girls and boys are accommodated separately. The hostels can accommodate about 500 girls and 1000 boys and further hostels are under construction. BVRIT provides quarters within the campus for its staff. The college has a health care facility which provides medical care for the staff and students. It has a qualified doctor who is available at all times on the campus and arranges regular medical checkups for the students and staff. BVRIT has dining hall and a cafeteria called 'Daffodils' as well as a Food Court (FC) with delicious food. The student committees decides the menus. There are fast food outlets in addition to the cafeteria.

The college has a 600-seat auditorium inaugurated by former president of India, Dr A. P. J. Abdul Kalam. BVRIT has introduced a learning atmosphere through an e-classroom which is used to develop communication skills, in–team based projects and curriculum-prescribed course work.

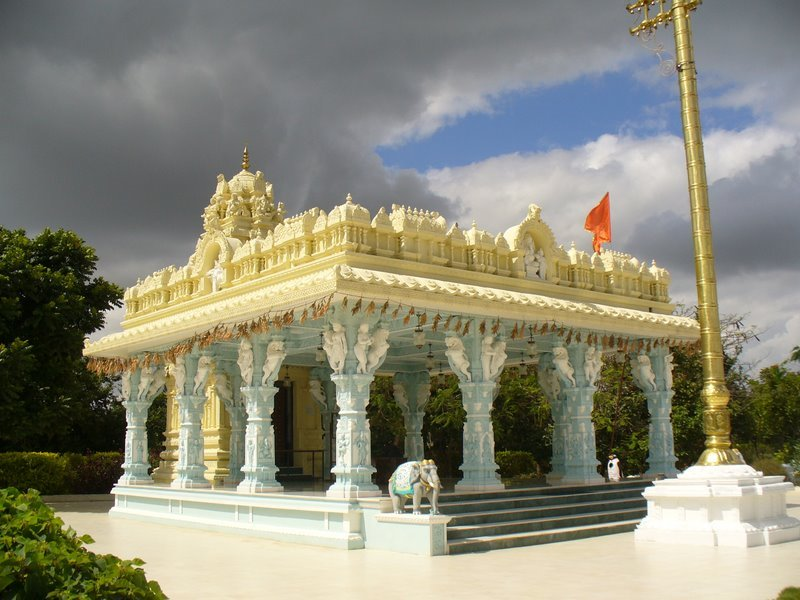
Ganesh temple

The Ganesh Temple is located in the campus. An artificial lake and a boating club have been established where students and faculty members can take a boat ride.

BVRIT is located around 50 km from Hyderabad and runs about 50 buses from in and around the city. It can also be reached by buses from JBS and Balanagar.

== Kalam's visit ==
Dr A. P. J. Abdul Kalam visited the college on 27 August 2007 and addressed the students. During his visit he inaugurated the 600-seat auditorium and the Sri Vishnu College of Pharmacy.

== See also ==
- Education in India
- Literacy in India
- List of institutions of higher education in Telangana
