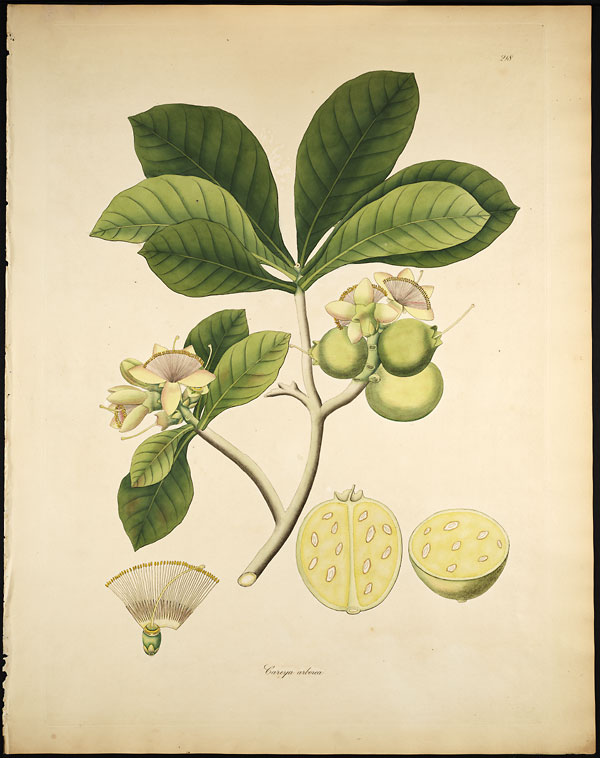
- Careya arborea

Scientific classification
- Kingdom: Plantae
- Clade: Tracheophytes
- Clade: Angiosperms
- Clade: Eudicots
- Clade: Asterids
- Order: Ericales
- Family: Lecythidaceae
- Genus: Careya
- Species: C. arborea

Binomial name
- Careya arborea Roxb.

Synonyms
- Barringtonia arborea (Roxb.) F.Muell.; Careya sphaerica Roxb.; Cumbia coneanae Buch.-Ham.; Careya venenata Oken; Careya orbiculata Miers

= Careya arborea =

Species of tree

Careya arborea is a species of tree in the Lecythidaceae family, native to the Indian subcontinent, Afghanistan, and Indochina. Its common English names include wild guava, Ceylon oak, patana oak. Careya arborea is a deciduous tree that grows up to 15 metres (49 ft) high. Its leaves turn red in the cold season. Flowers are yellow or white in colour that become large green berries. The tree grows throughout India in forests and grasslands.

== Common names ==
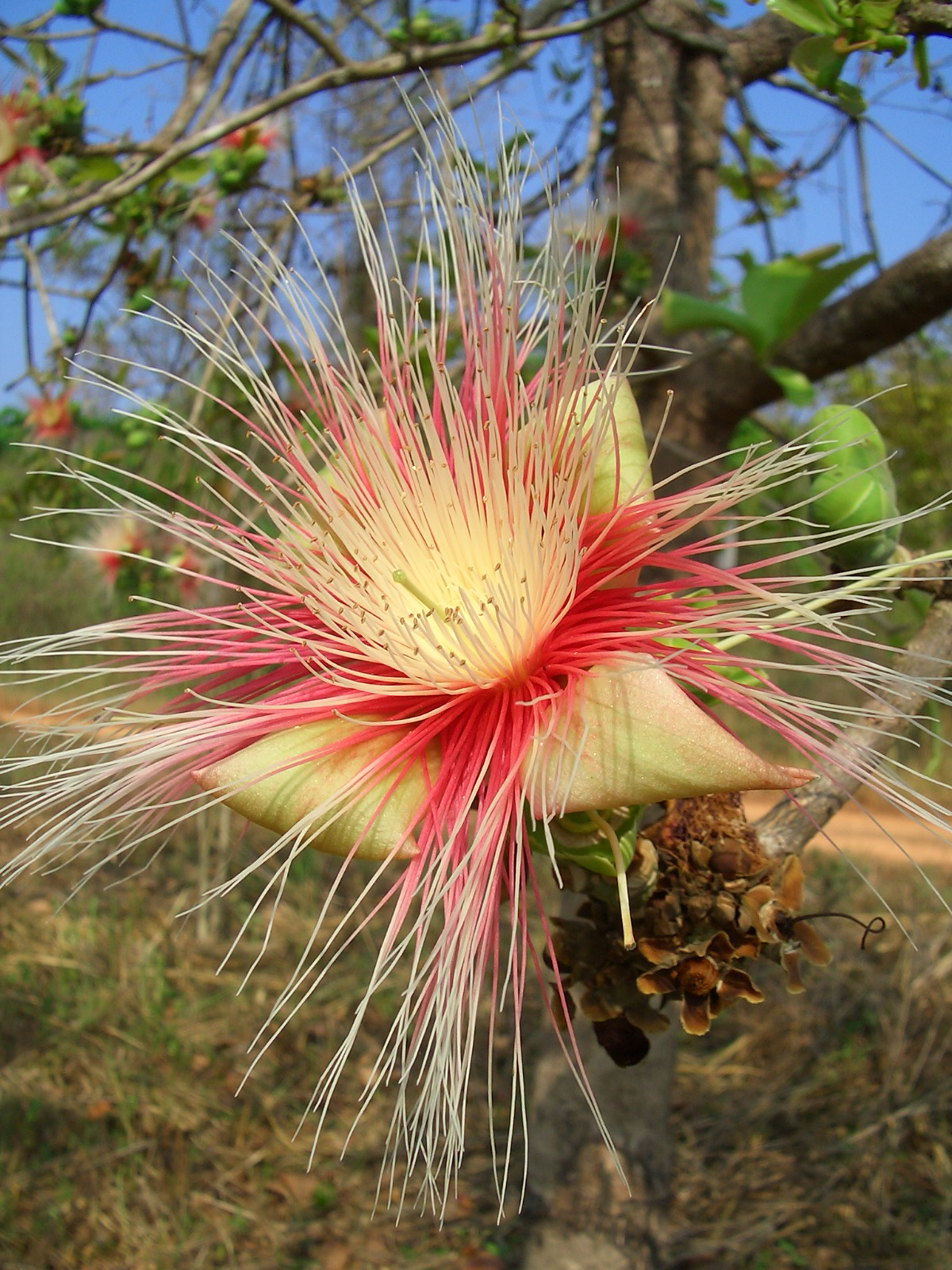
Careya arborea

- Assamese: Godhajam কুম Kum, kumari, কুম্ভী kumbhi
- Bengali: Vakamba, Kumhi, Kumbhi
- Burmese: ban bwe (ဘန့်ပွေး)
- Garo: Dimbil bol
- Hindi: कुम्भी Kumbhi
- Kannada: ಅಲಗವ್ವೆಲೆ alagavvele, ದದ್ದಾಲ daddal, ಕವಲು Koulu mara, ಗೌಜಲು Gaujal
- Khasi: Ka Mahir, Soh Kundur
- Khmer: Kandaol (កណ្ដោល)
- Malayalam: പേഴ് Peezh, Peelam, Pela, Paer, Alam
- Marathi: कुम्भा Kumbha
- Oriya: Kumbh
- Sanskrit: Bhadrendrani, गिरिकर्णिका Girikarnika, Kaidarya, कालिंदी Kalindi
- Sinhala: Kahata
- Tamil: பேழை Peezhai, Aima, Karekku, Puta-tanni-maram
- Telugu: araya, budatadadimma, budatanevadi, buddaburija
- Thai: kradone (กระโดน)
- Vietnamese: Vừng (sometimes Vừng xoan)

== Uses ==
In colonial times in India, the fibrous bark of this tree was found to be an ideal substitute for beech bark as matches for matchlocks.

The Careya arborea leaves are traditionally used to roll cheroots in Myanmar (Burma). The town of Pyay (formerly Prome) is known for a local delicacy known as taw laphet (တောလက်ဖက်; lit. 'rural laphet') or Nibbinda laphet (နိဗ္ဗိန္ဒလက်ဖက်) that is tightly packed in parcel-like Careya arborea leaves for fermentation and preservation purposes.

Flowers and young leaves are eaten as salad greens in Thailand. Young fruit is reported to be edible, though seeds are slightly poisonous.

== Gallery ==
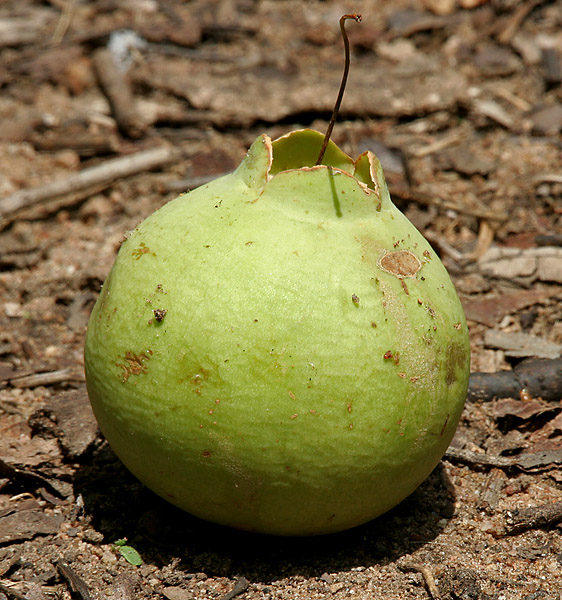
Fruit in Narsapur, Medak district, India.

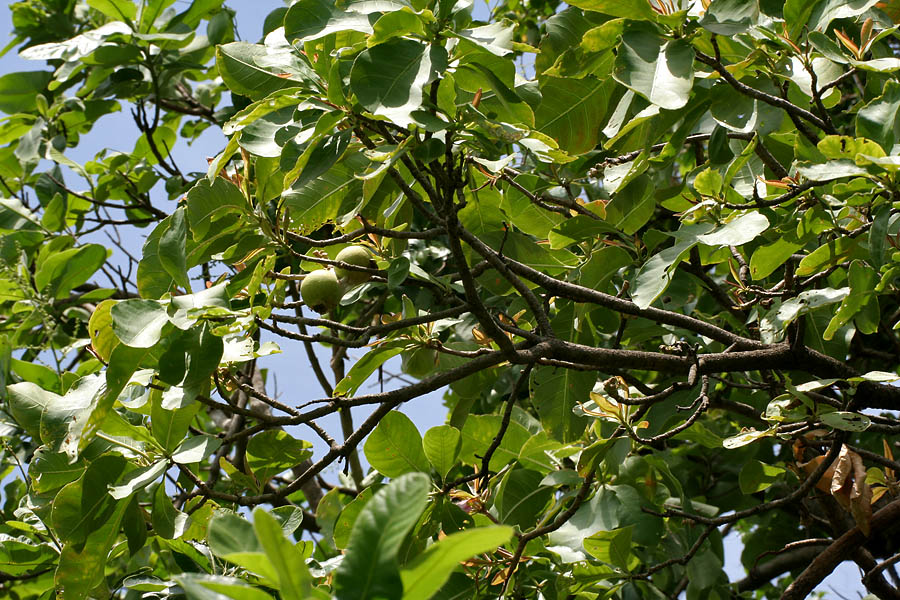
Fruit with leaves in Narsapur, Medak district, India.

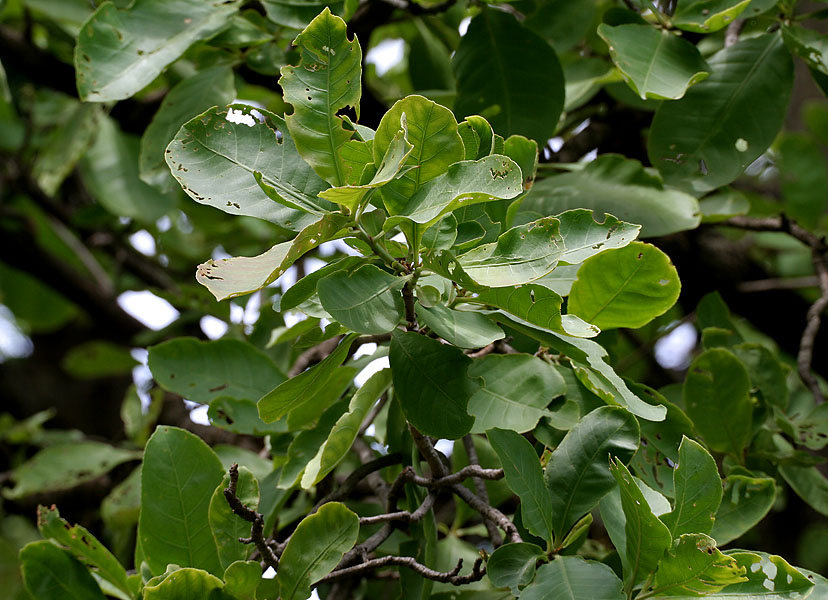
Leaves in Narsapur, Medak district, India.

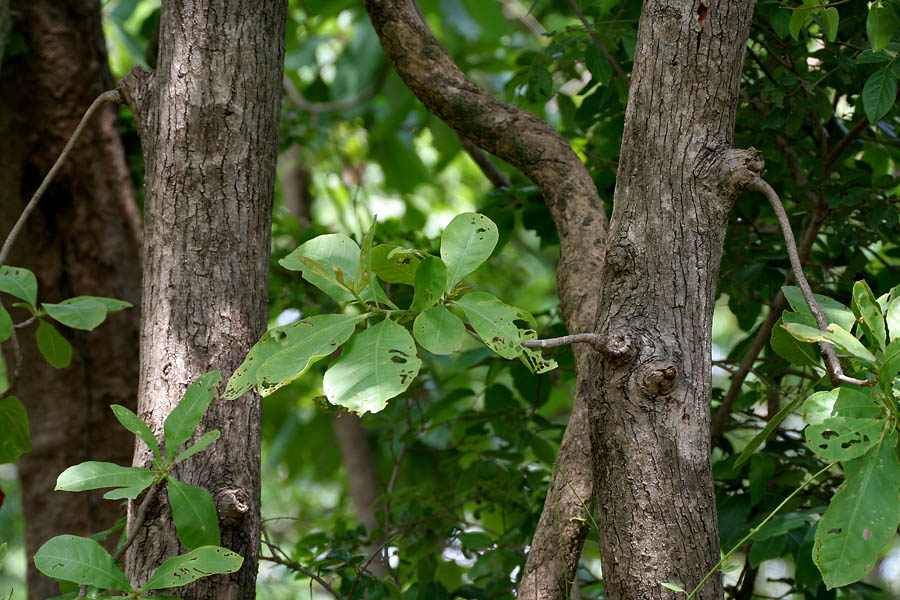
Trunk in Narsapur, Medak district, India.

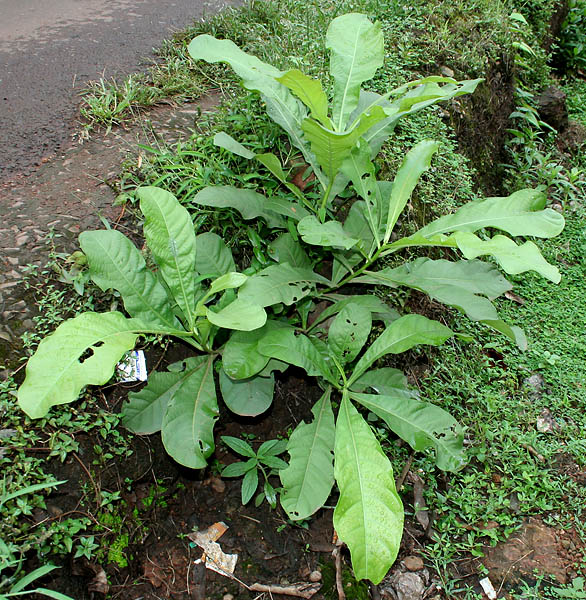
Grey Count Tanaecia lepidea caterpillar on Careya arborea sapling in Goa, India.

== See also ==
- Pīlu
