= 1998 North Indian Ocean cyclone season =

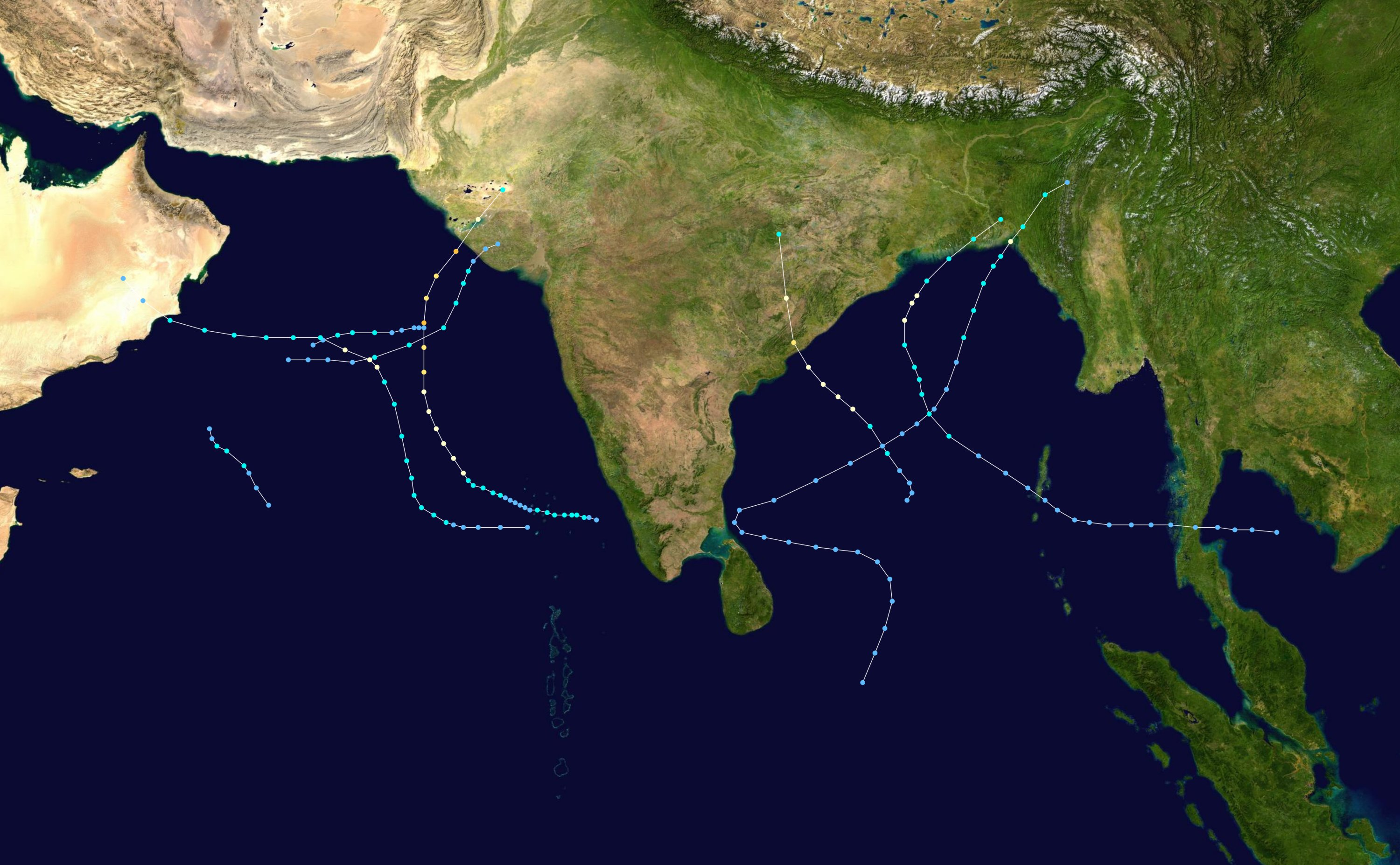
- Season summary map

Seasonal boundaries
- First system formed: May 17, 1998
- Last system dissipated: December 17, 1998

Strongest storm
- Name: ARB 02
  - Maximum winds: 165 km/h (105 mph) (3-minute sustained)
  - Lowest pressure: 958 hPa (mbar)

Seasonal statistics
- Depressions: 12
- Deep depressions: 10
- Cyclonic storms: 6
- Severe cyclonic storms: 5
- Very severe cyclonic storms: 3
- Extremely severe cyclonic storms: 1
- Super cyclonic storms: 0
- Total fatalities: ≥10,212 direct, 12 indirect, >4,353 missing
- Total damage: At least $3 billion (1998 USD)

Related articles
- 1998 Atlantic hurricane season; 1998 Pacific hurricane season; 1998 Pacific typhoon season

The 1998 North Indian Ocean cyclone season was an active season in annual cycle of tropical cyclone formation. The season has no official bounds but cyclones tend to form between April and December. These dates conventionally delimit the period of each year when most tropical cyclones form in the northern Indian Ocean. There are two main seas in the North Indian Ocean—the Bay of Bengal to the east of the Indian subcontinent and the Arabian Sea to the west of India. The official Regional Specialized Meteorological Centre in this basin is the India Meteorological Department (IMD), while the Joint Typhoon Warning Center releases unofficial advisories. An average of four to six storms form in the North Indian Ocean every season with peaks in May and November. Cyclones occurring between the meridians 45°E and 100°E are included in the season by the IMD.

With eleven depressions and eight tropical cyclones, this was one of the most active seasons in the ocean along with 1987, 1996, and 2005. The season caused a large loss of life, most of which was from one storm. Over 10,000 people were killed in India when Tropical Cyclone 03A brought a 4.9-metre (16-foot) storm surge to the Kathiawar Peninsula, inundating numerous salt mines. Total damages from the storm amounted to Rs. 120 billion (US$3 billion). Tropical Cyclone 01B killed at least 26 people and left at least 4,000 fishermen missing in eastern Bangladesh on May 20. A short lived depression in mid-October killed 122 people after triggering severe flooding in Andhra Pradesh. In November, Tropical Cyclone 06B killed six people and caused property damage worth BTN 880 million (US$20.7 million) in eastern India. An additional 40 people were killed and 100 fishermen were listed as missing after Tropical Cyclone 07B affected Bangladesh.

== Season summary ==
The first storm of the season developed on May 18 out of an area of low pressure over the Bay of Bengal. It reached its peak intensity with winds of 130 km/h (81 mph) before making landfall near Chittagong, Bangladesh. The storm dissipated shortly after. Later that month, a short-lived storm developed over the Arabian Sea and dissipated the next day without impacting land. The most intense storm of the season formed in early June off the southwestern coast of India. It slowly traveled towards the west, remaining relatively weak before turning towards the north and intensifying. The storm reached its peak intensity with winds of 195 km/h (121 mph) shortly before making landfall near Porbandar in the Indian state of Gujarat. The cyclone rapidly dissipated on the same day.

After three months of inactivity, five storms developed in late September and October. Two of them strengthened into tropical storms, neither of which impacted land. In early November, the sixth tropical cyclone of the season developed in the Bay of Bengal. The storm quickly developed and reached its peak intensity upon landfall with winds of 155 km/h (96 mph). The storm rapidly dissipated the same day it made landfall. Shortly after 06B dissipated, the remnants of Tropical Storm Chip triggered the development of a new cyclone over the Bay of Bengal. The storm tracked along the edge of a subtropical ridge, reaching its peak intensity over open waters with winds of 140 km/h (87 mph). The cyclone entered an area of higher wind shear shortly after and rapidly weakened before making landfall. Then it dissipated in Bangladesh. The final cyclone of the season developed in the Arabian Sea during mid-December. It reached its peak intensity with winds of 120 km/h (75 mph) before weakening due to strong wind shear. It made landfall in Oman on December 17 as a minimal tropical storm shortly before dissipating.

== Systems ==
=== Severe Cyclonic Storm BOB 01 (01B) ===
- Severe cyclonic storm (IMD)
- Category 1 tropical cyclone (SSHWS)
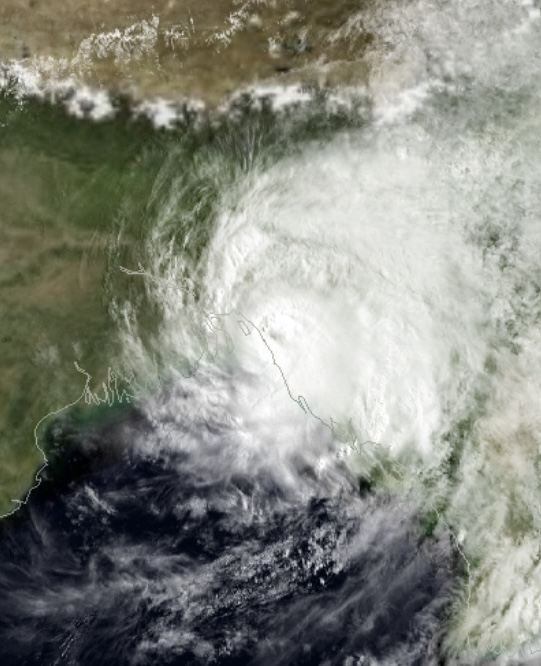
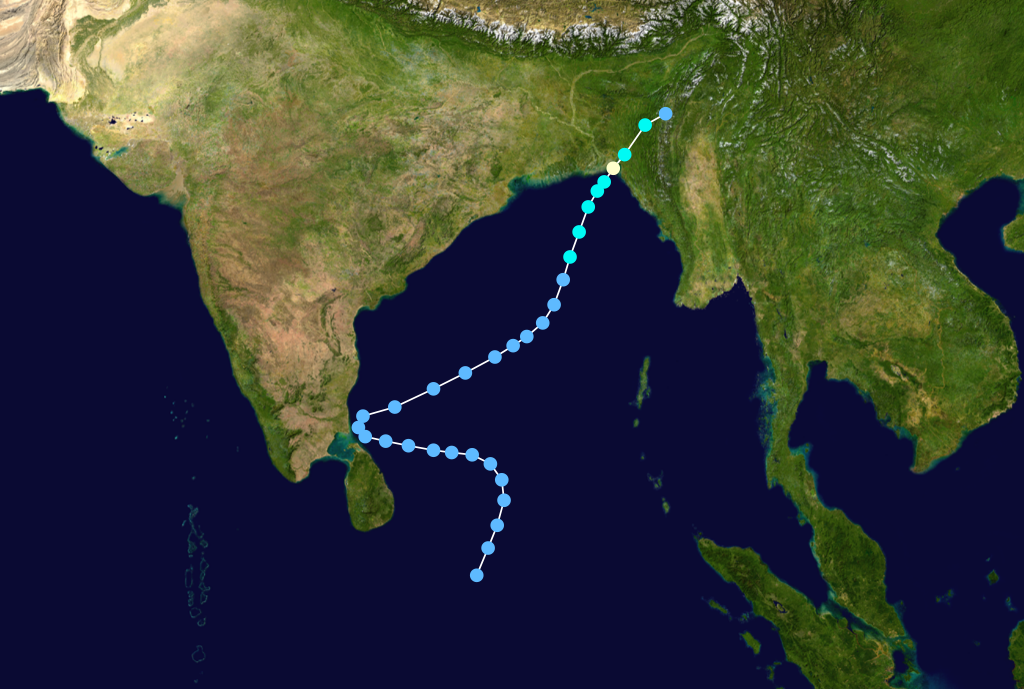
- Duration: May 17 – May 20
- Peak intensity: 110 km/h (70 mph) (3-min); 972 hPa (mbar)

The first cyclone in the region developed as a tropical disturbance on May 13 over the southern Bay of Bengal to the southeast of Sri Lanka. At 0700 UTC on May 17, the Joint Typhoon Warning Center (JTWC) issued a Tropical Cyclone Formation Alert (TCFA). Shortly after, the India Meteorological Department (IMD) declared that the disturbance developed into Depression BOB 01. At 0600 UTC on May 18, the first advisory on Tropical Cyclone 01B was issued by the JTWC, while the IMD upgraded BOB 01 to a deep depression.

Continuing on a northeasterly track, BOB 01 gradually intensified as it neared Bangladesh, strengthened into a cyclonic storm twelve hours later. Early on May 20, BOB 01 reached its peak intensity as a severe cyclonic storm with winds of 110 km/h (68 mph) and a barometric pressure of 972 mbar (hPa). The JTWC assessed the storm to have peaked with winds of 130 km/h (81 mph), equivalent to a Category 1 hurricane on the Saffir–Simpson Hurricane Scale. An eye developed and the system made landfall several hours later near Chittagong. After making landfall, the storm quickly weakened, dissipating later that day.

Ahead of the storm, officials in Bangladesh relocated an estimated 650,000 people, resulting in a lower loss of life. But BOB 01 adversely affected low-lying areas, destroying 6,000 homes and damaging another 9,945. It produced a storm surge of 1.8 to 3 m (5.9 to 9.8 ft), inundating coastal towns. At least 35 people were killed by the storm and 504 others were injured. Additionally, an estimated 4,000 fishermen were listed as missing at sea. Two ships owned by the Bangladesh Shipping Corporation sustained significant damage.

=== Depression ARB 01 (02A) ===
- Depression (IMD)
- Tropical storm (SSHWS)
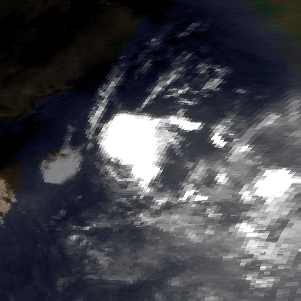
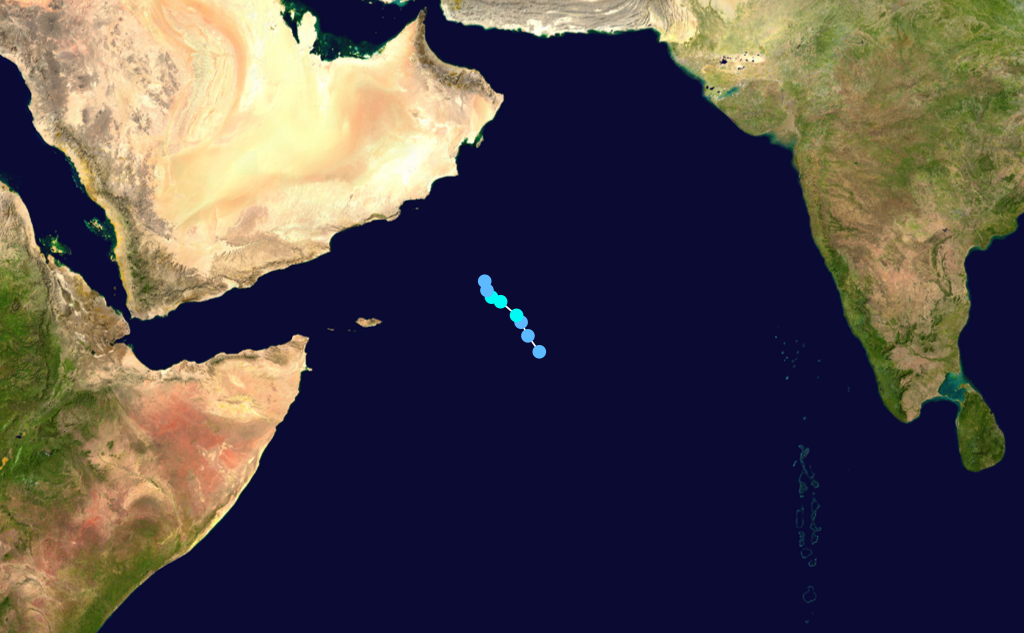
- Duration: May 28 – May 29
- Peak intensity: 45 km/h (30 mph) (3-min); 997 hPa (mbar)

On May 27, an area of low pressure developed over the central Arabian Sea. Early the next day, the JTWC issued their first advisory on Tropical Cyclone 02A while the system was located about 740 km (460 mi) south of Masirah Island. The IMD only briefly monitored the system as a weak depression, designating it as ARB 01. Upon being classified a tropical cyclone, 02A reached its peak intensity. The speed of its winds was 65 km/h (40 mph). Soon, it began to dissipate due to increasing vertical wind shear. The center of circulation quickly became devoid of convection. The storm weakened below tropical storm intensity later that day before dissipating on May 29 over open waters.

=== Extremely Severe Cyclonic Storm ARB 02 (03A) ===
- Extremely severe cyclonic storm (IMD)
- Category 3 tropical cyclone (SSHWS)
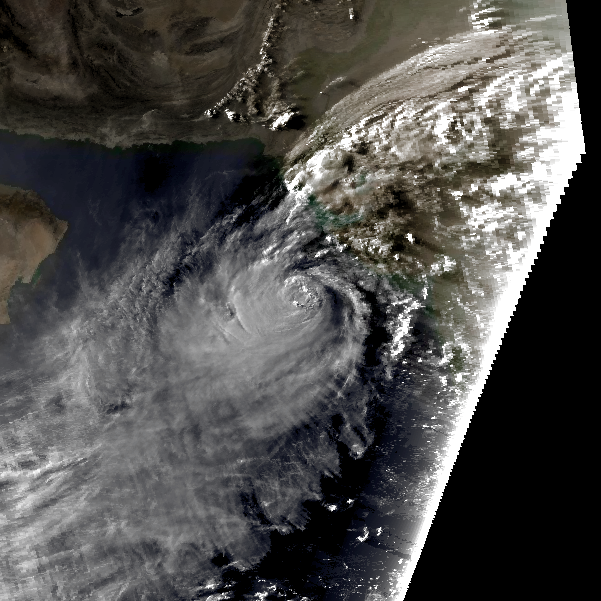
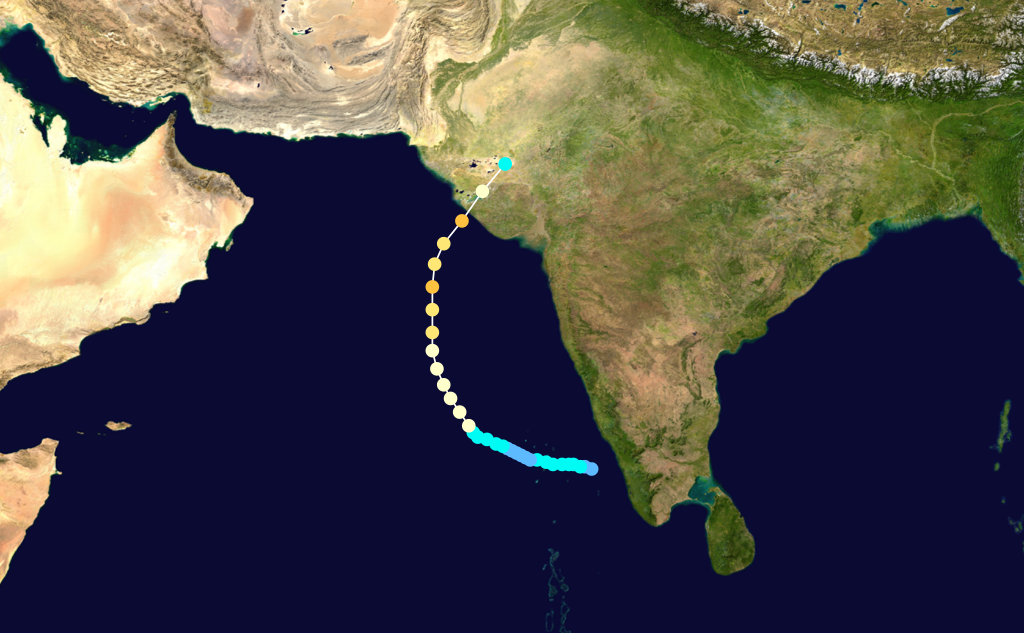
- Duration: June 4 – June 10
- Peak intensity: 165 km/h (105 mph) (3-min); 958 hPa (mbar)

On June 1, an area of low pressure developed over the Laccadive Islands. Two days later, the JTWC issued a TCFA for the system as it became better organized. Early on June 4, the JTWC issued its first advisory on Tropical Cyclone 03A. Around the same time, the IMD began monitoring the system as Depression ARB 02. Shortly after, the depression was upgraded to a deep depression and further strengthened into a cyclonic storm the following day. The small storm moved slowly towards the west and weakened as wind shear began to increase. The storm weakened below tropical storm intensity later that day and the initial final advisory was issued. However, the system redeveloped and advisories resumed the next day. The storm gradually intensified as it moved towards the northwest. Dvorak satellite intensity estimates on June 6 reached T4.0, corresponding to an intensity of 120 km/h (75 mph). The IMD also marked the increase in intensity, upgrading ARB 02 to a severe cyclonic storm. Around this time, the storm began to turn towards the north and accelerate due to an approaching mid-level trough. As the storm neared the Indian coastline, an eye developed and the storm strengthened into the equivalent of a major hurricane with winds reaching 185 km/h (115 mph). The IMD assessed the storm to be a very severe cyclonic storm at this time, with winds up to 165 km/h (103 mph) and a barometric pressure of 958 mbar (hPa). After slightly weakening early on June 9, 03A re-strengthened, attaining its peak intensity with winds of 195 km/h (121 mph). Then it made landfall near Porbandar in the Indian state of Gujarat between 0100 and 0200 UTC. The storm weakened following landfall and the JTWC issued their final advisory later that day. The IMD continued to monitor ARB 02 until June 10, by which time it had weakened to a depression before dissipating.

Tropical Cyclone 03A brought a large storm surge of 4.9 m (16 ft) which devastated coastal communities and salt mines. An estimated 4,000 to 10,000 people were killed by the storm, many of whom were salt mine workers who did not own a radio and received little or no warning of the cyclone. The large loss of life was partially attributed to contractors who wanted to continue making profits and did not inform their workers of the approaching storm. According to the official figures, 1173 people died and 1774 people went missing. Also, the region had witnessed only 17 cyclones since 1890, all of which were weaker than 03A. As a result, its vulnerability was miscalculated by the local population and the disaster management administration. Power supply to numerous residences was lost due to the storms high winds. A microwave tower in Porbandar collapsed, causing widespread disruption in telecommunication. Hundreds of other power transmission towers also fell, causing an estimated loss of Rs 10 billion for the Gujarat Electricity Board. At least 893 people were injured by the storm and over 11,000 animals were killed. Over 162,000 structures were damaged or destroyed throughout the affected area and damages amounted to Rs. 120 billion (US$3 billion). In Kandla, the damages were estimated around ₹1,855.33 crore (equivalent to ₹84 billion or US$870 million in 2023). Over the next one month, insurance companies had lost approximately Rs. 13 billion (US$266.5 million). The remnants of the storm produced heavy rains over Pakistan which electrocuted 12 people. In the wake of the storm, the United States Government provided US$25,000 for rehabilitation of the affected population. The Government of Denmark also contributed $72,992 in funds for relief efforts. The Gujarat government deployed approximately 330 medical teams to the affected areas. Local aid, amounting to Rs 1 billion (US$20.5 million) was provided to assist victims.

=== Deep Depression BOB 02 ===
- Deep depression (IMD)
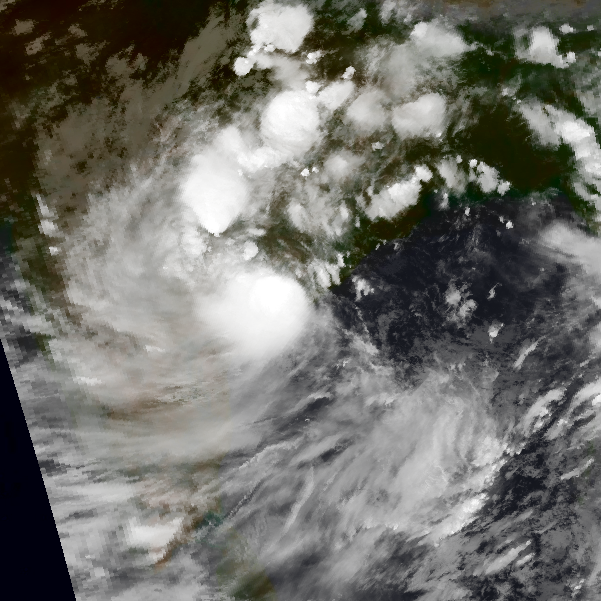
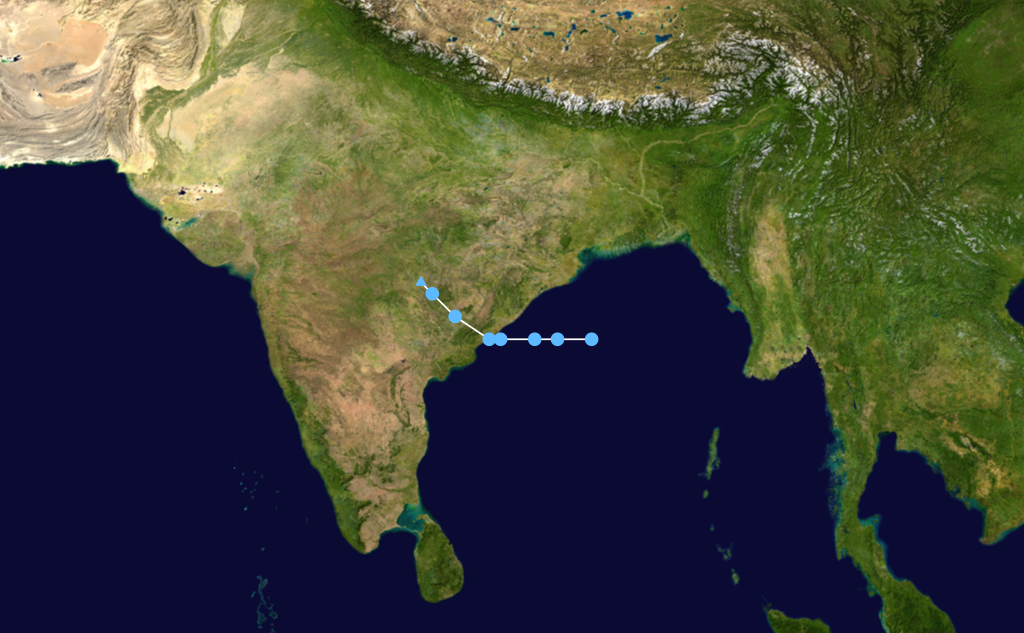
- Duration: June 13 – June 15
- Peak intensity: 55 km/h (35 mph) (3-min); 992 hPa (mbar)

On June 13, the IMD began monitoring a depression over the central Bay of Bengal. Tracking towards the west, the depression intensified into a deep depression, peaking with winds of 55 km/h (34 mph) and a minimum pressure of 992 mbar (hPa). Around 15:00 UTC on June 14, the deep depression made landfall near Visakhapatnam. Shortly thereafter, it weakened to a depression and dissipated early the following day.

=== Depression ARB 03 (04A) ===
- Depression (IMD)
- Tropical storm (SSHWS)
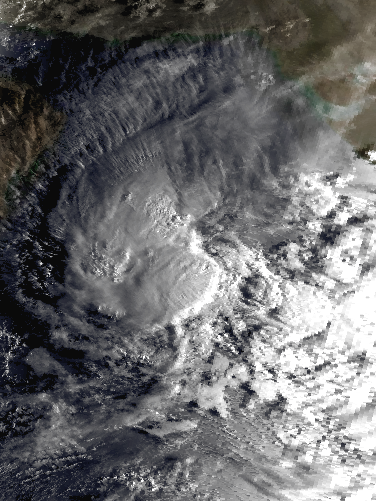
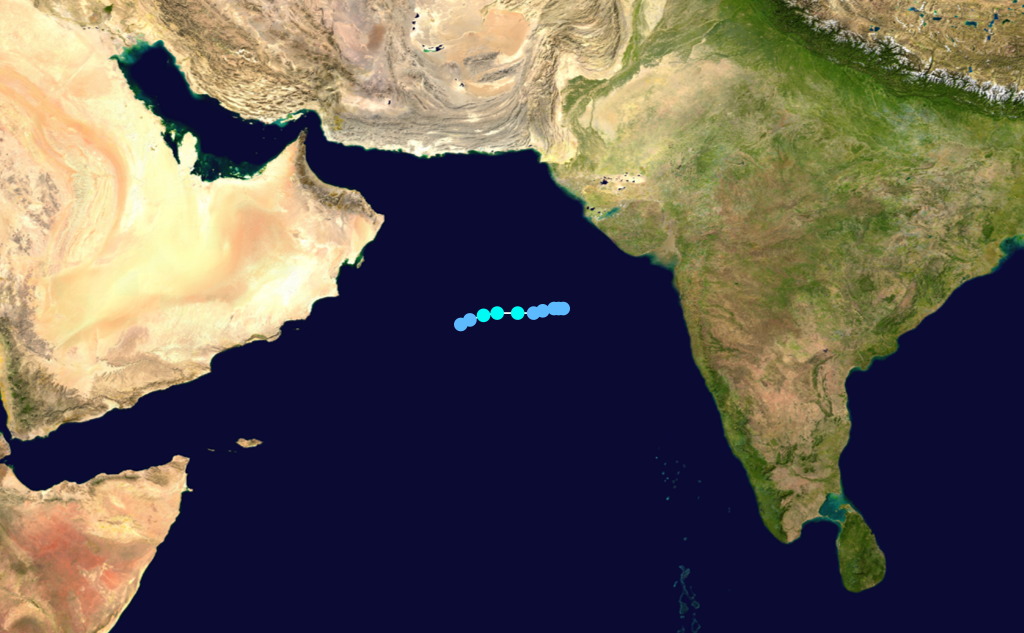
- Duration: September 30 – October 1
- Peak intensity: 45 km/h (30 mph) (3-min); 997 hPa (mbar)

In late September, an area of low pressure developed over the Arabian Sea within an east–west oriented surface trough while located about 740 km (460 mi) west of Mumbai, India. The system gradually intensified as it moved slowly towards the west. Early on September 30, the JTWC issued its first advisory on Tropical Cyclone 04A. Its winds peaked at 65 km/h (40 mph). Located within an area of moderate wind shear, the storm quickly weakened and dissipated early on October 1.

=== Deep Depression ARB 04 ===
- Deep depression (IMD)
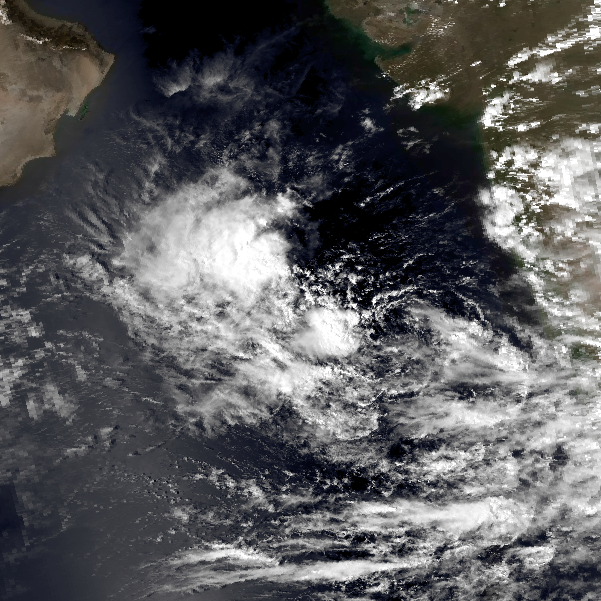
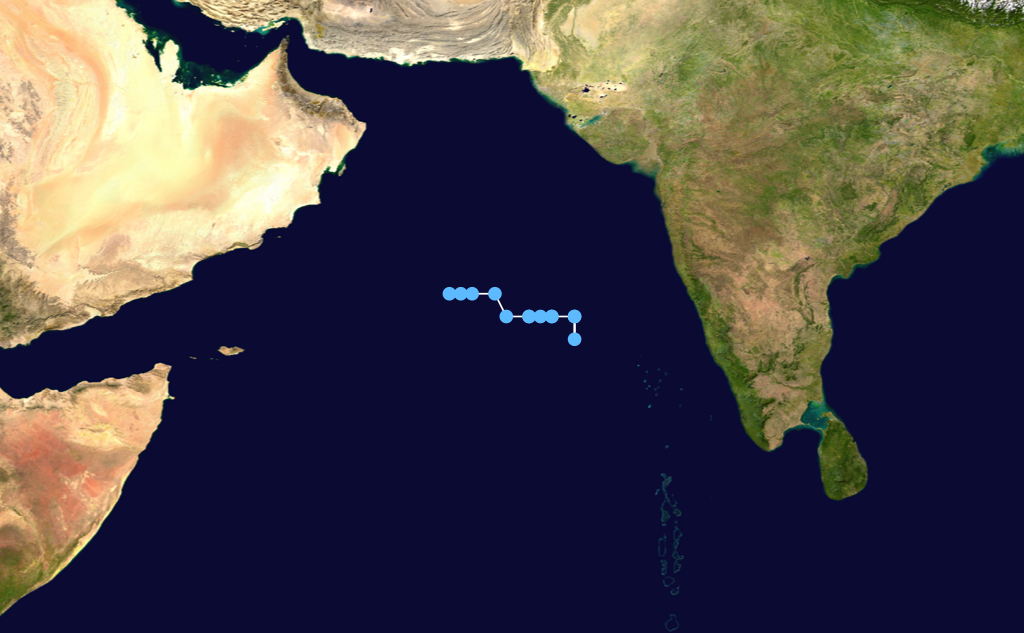
- Duration: October 6 – October 9
- Peak intensity: 55 km/h (35 mph) (3-min); 998 hPa (mbar)

On October 8, the IMD began monitoring a tropical depression located about 835 km (519 mi) southwest of Mumbai. The depression was briefly classified as a deep depression with winds of 55 km/h (34 mph) and a minimum pressure of 998 mbar (hPa) as it moved towards the west-northwest. Shortly after reaching its peak intensity, the depression weakened. The last advisory was issued the next day while the storm was over open waters.

=== Cyclonic Storm ARB 05 (05A) ===
- Cyclonic storm (IMD)
- Tropical storm (SSHWS)
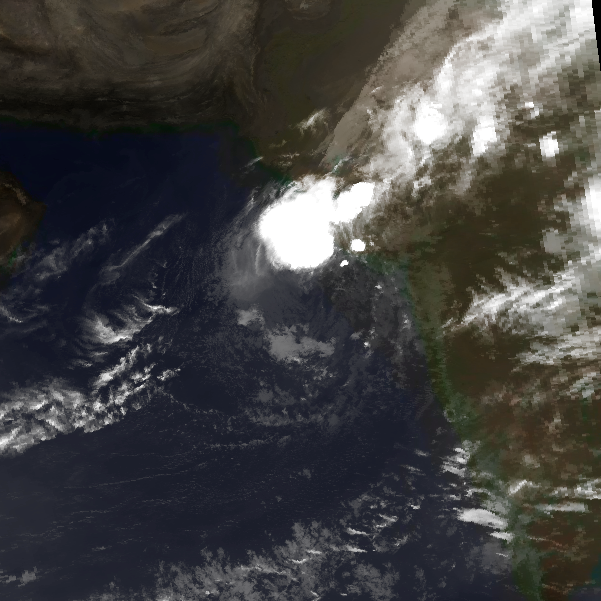
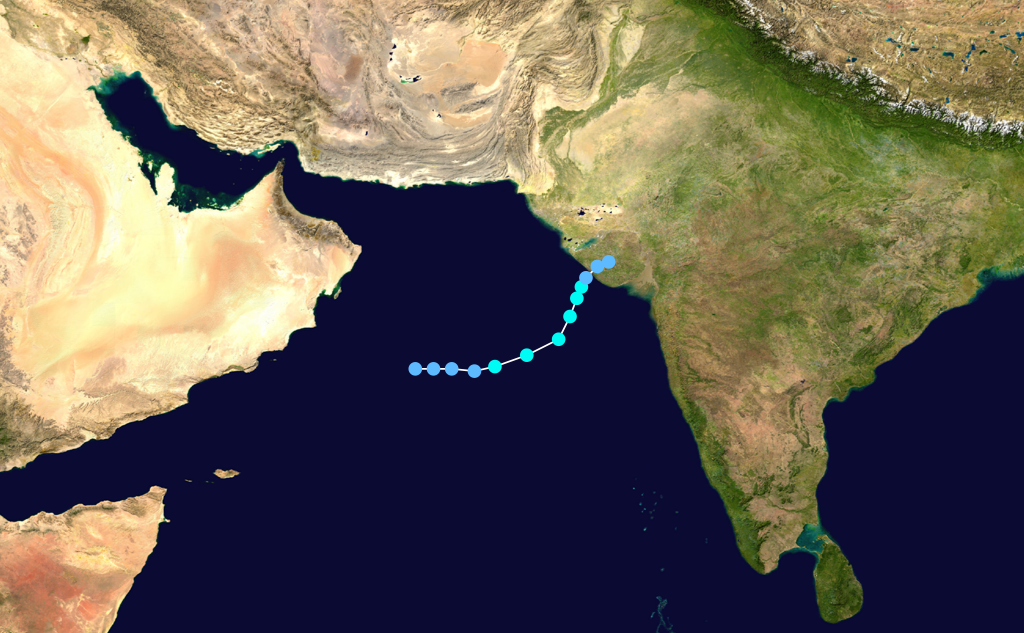
- Duration: October 11 – October 18
- Peak intensity: 65 km/h (40 mph) (3-min); 996 hPa (mbar)

The IMD began monitoring an area of low pressure over the Laccadive Islands on October 10. The low traveled towards the northwest with little development. On October 15, the JTWC issued a TCFA as the system became better organized. Although wind shear increased, the first advisory was issued the next day. With minimal convection, the storm never intensified past 65 km/h (40 mph). The system traveled towards the northeast and weakened due to strong wind shear. On October 17, the storm fell below tropical storm status and made landfall on the Kathiawar Peninsula, near the same area where 03A made landfall in early June. The storm dissipated shortly after landfall.

As the storm neared land, officials in Gujarat evacuated hundreds of residents from coastal areas. Due to the low-intensity of the storm, no damage was reported on land and only light rain fell. However, offshore, more than 250 people were reported as missing when contact was lost with numerous fishing vessels. One-hundred-twenty people on twelve ships from Satpathy village were among the missing. One of the ships capsized; however, the crew of 12 swam to shore. One boat from Vasai carrying 20 people was also missing. Ten fishermen from Colaba were reported as missing, three of which later swam to shore. The Indian Coast Guard immediately dispatched search and rescue ships and naval helicopters to find the missing people.

=== Deep Depression BOB 03 ===
- Deep depression (IMD)
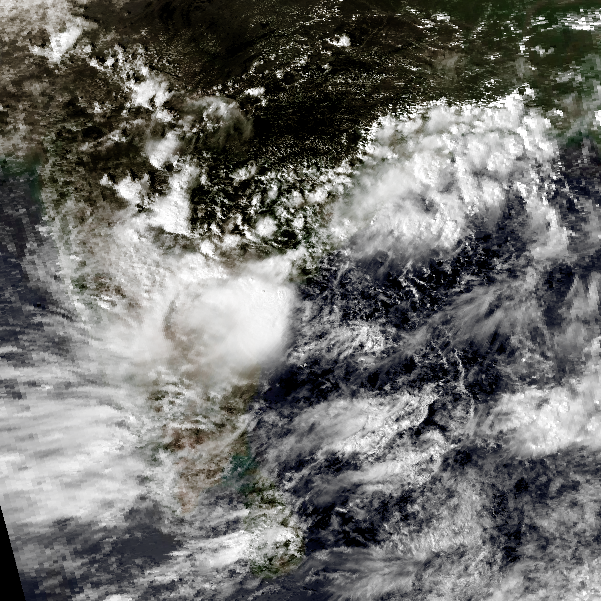
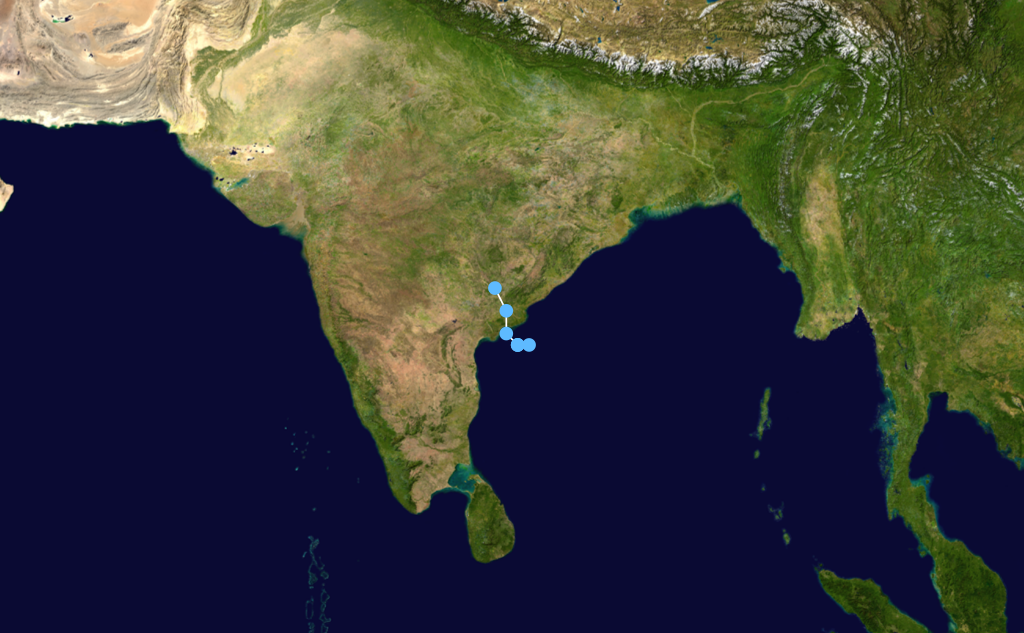
- Duration: October 13 – October 15
- Peak intensity: 55 km/h (35 mph) (3-min); 998 hPa (mbar)

On October 13, the IMD began monitoring a tropical depression off the eastern coast of India. The depression remained relatively weak, with winds peaking at 45 km/h (28 mph) before the storm made landfall near Narsapur in the Andhra Pradesh early on October 14. The depression dissipated shortly after landfall. Heavy rains produced by the depression damaged croplands and property. Twenty-four-hour rainfall totals reached 110 mm (4.3 in) in localized areas, triggering flash floods in areas severely impacted by another system a week earlier. In Hyderabad, schools and government offices were closed. During the morning of October 14, overflow from a dam inundated the Srisailam powerhouse, forcing officials to shut down the plant. Numerous highways were also closed due to flowing water. The following day, the water level of the dam continued to rise, leading to the evacuation of nearly 53,000 residents in the area. Throughout Andhra Pradesh, flooding from the depression resulted in 101 fatalities.

=== Deep Depression BOB 04 ===
- Deep depression (IMD)
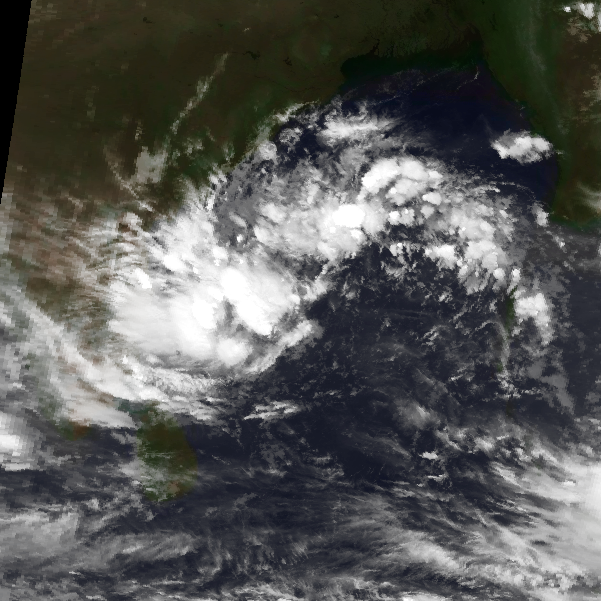
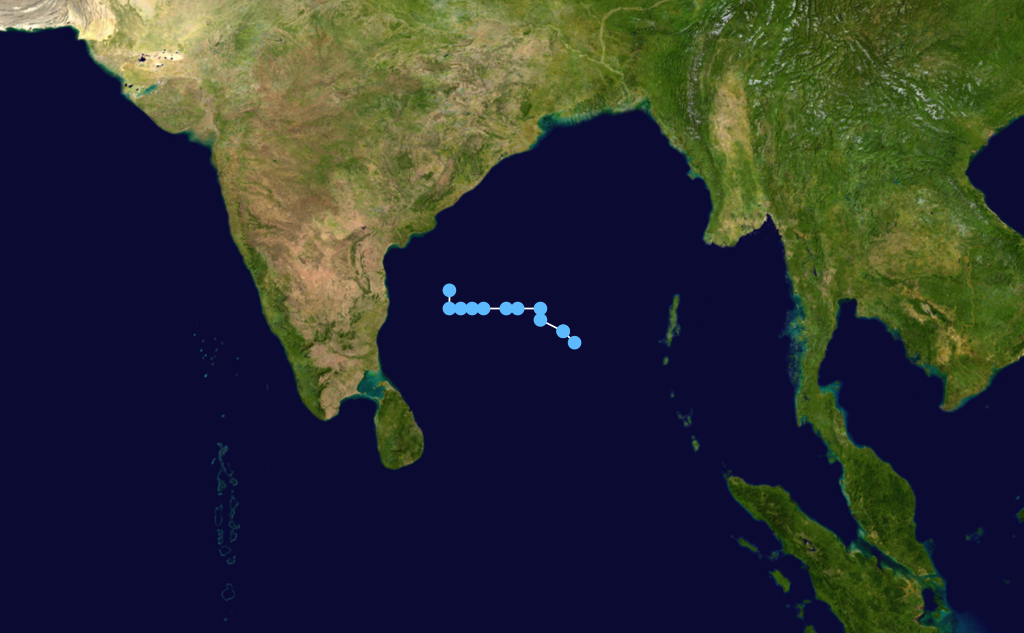
- Duration: October 26 – October 29
- Peak intensity: 55 km/h (35 mph) (3-min); 1002 hPa (mbar)

Early on October 28, the IMD began monitoring a tropical depression located about 555 km (345 mi) south-southeast of Visakhapatnam in the Andhra Pradesh. The depression strengthened to a deep depression later that day with winds peaking at 55 km/h (34 mph) before undergoing a weakening trend. The depression dissipated the next day near the Andhra Pradesh coastline. The outer bands of the depression produced light rainfall over the coast of Andhra Pradesh.

=== Very Severe Cyclonic Storm BOB 05 (06B) ===
- Very severe cyclonic storm (IMD)
- Category 2 tropical cyclone (SSHWS)
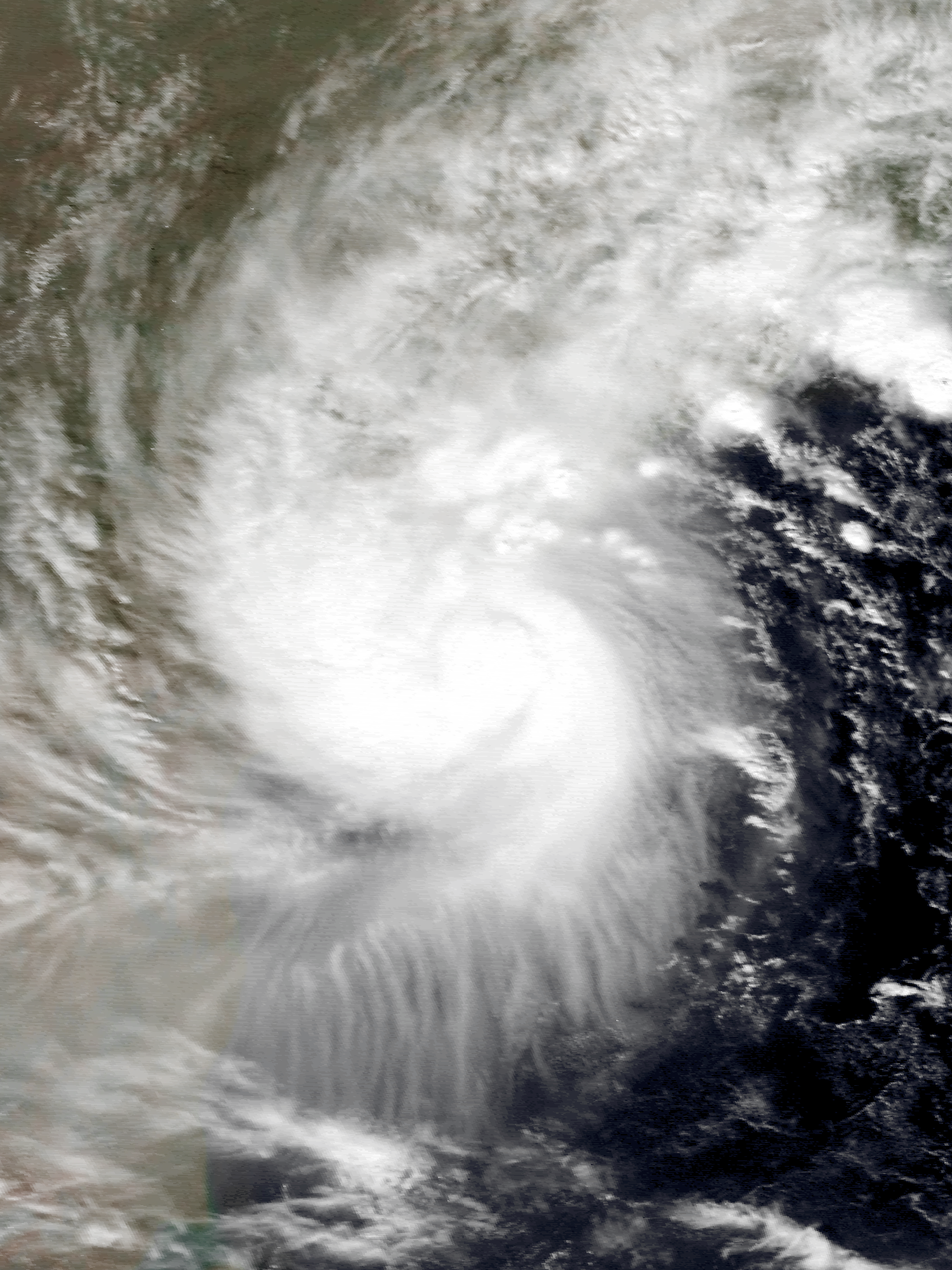
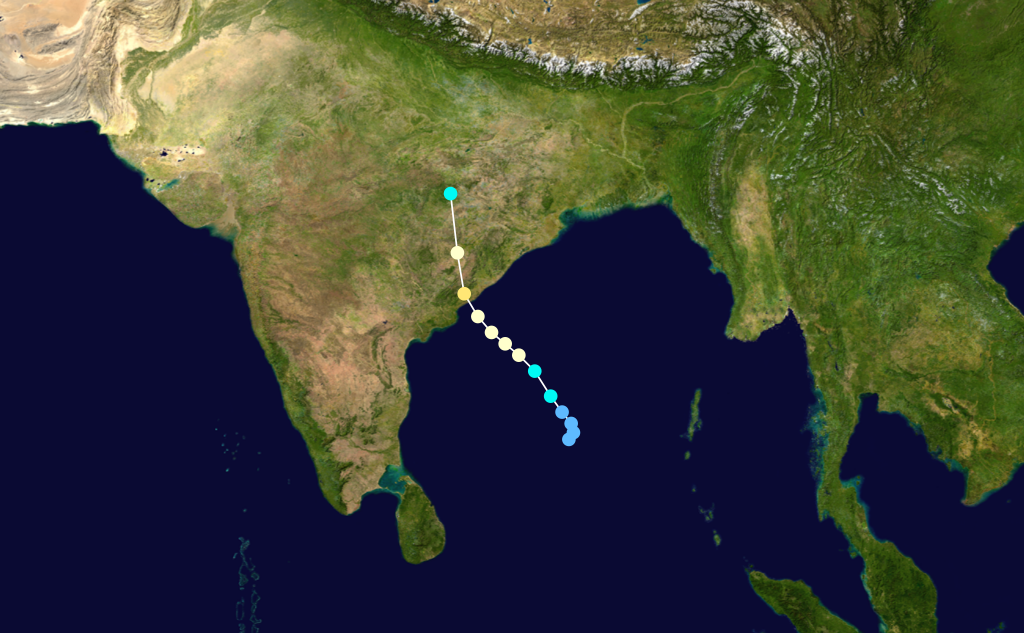
- Duration: November 13 – November 16
- Peak intensity: 145 km/h (90 mph) (3-min); 982 hPa (mbar)

On November 10, an area of low pressure developed over the Bay of Bengal within a monsoonal trough. Moving towards the northwest, the low gradually developed and the JTWC issued a TCFA early on November 13. The next day, the first advisory on Tropical Cyclone 06B was issued. A brief period of rapid development took place as the storm strengthened just below Category 1 status. Shortly before making landfall near Visakhapatnam, 06B reached its peak intensity with winds of 155 km/h (96 mph). At this time, the IMD classified the cyclone as a Very Severe Cyclonic Storm and reported that it had a 60 km (37 mi) wide eye. Rapid weakening followed shortly after landfall and the storm dissipated early on November 16.

Major crop losses, property damage, and six fatalities were reported from the affected areas. Four of the fatalities were in Visakhapatnam and the other two were in east Godavari. Hundreds of trees and power lines had fallen. At least 116,000 acres (470 km^{2}) of cropland and more than 2,000 homes were damaged. Waves produced by the storm at Visakhapatnam were recorded up to 5.74 m (18.8 ft). The storm dropped rainfall in excess of 100 mm (3.9 in) throughout the region. Damages from the storm were estimated at BTN 880 million (US$20.7 million).

=== Very Severe Cyclonic Storm BOB 06 (07B) ===
- Very severe cyclonic storm (IMD)
- Category 1 tropical cyclone (SSHWS)
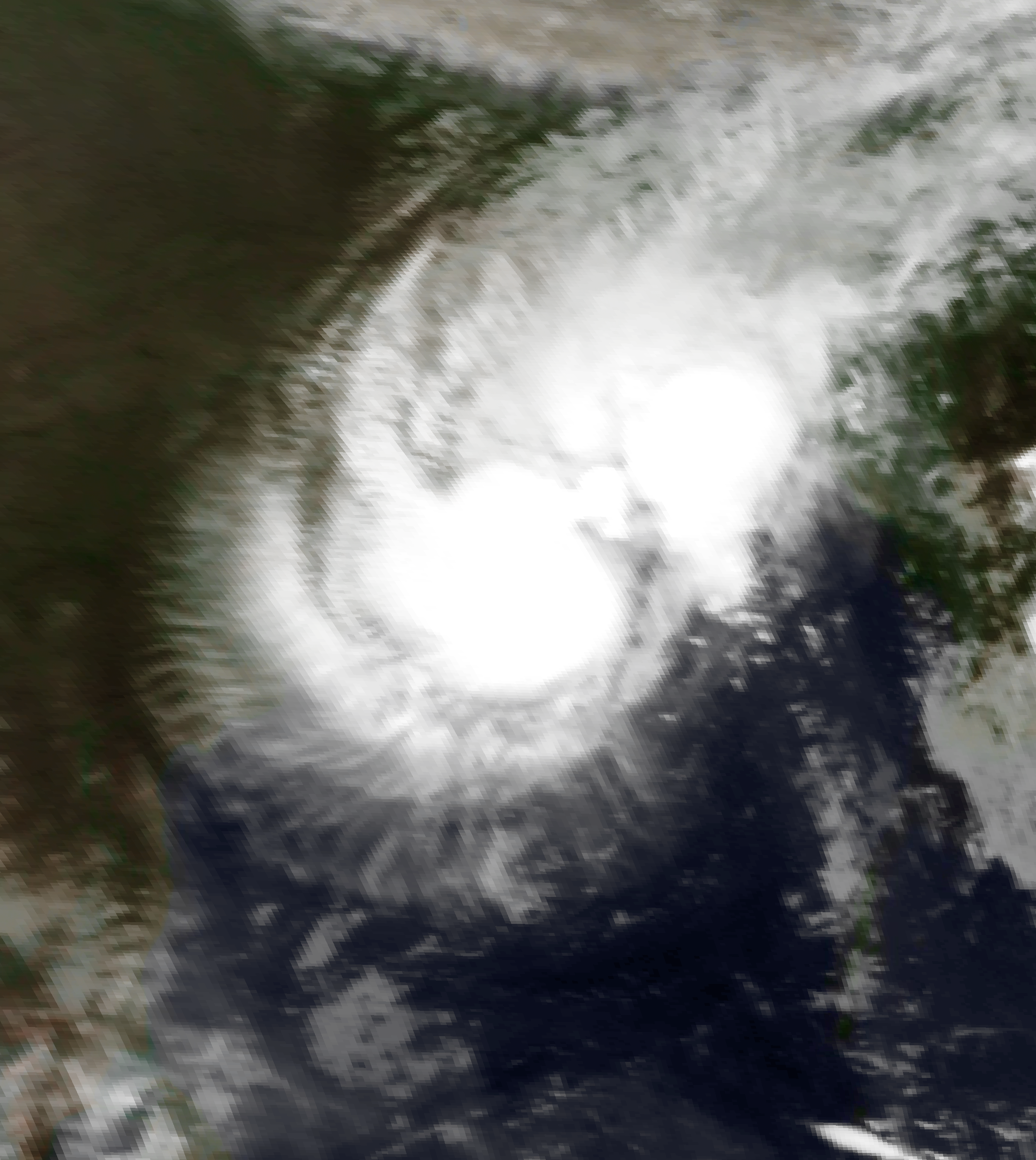
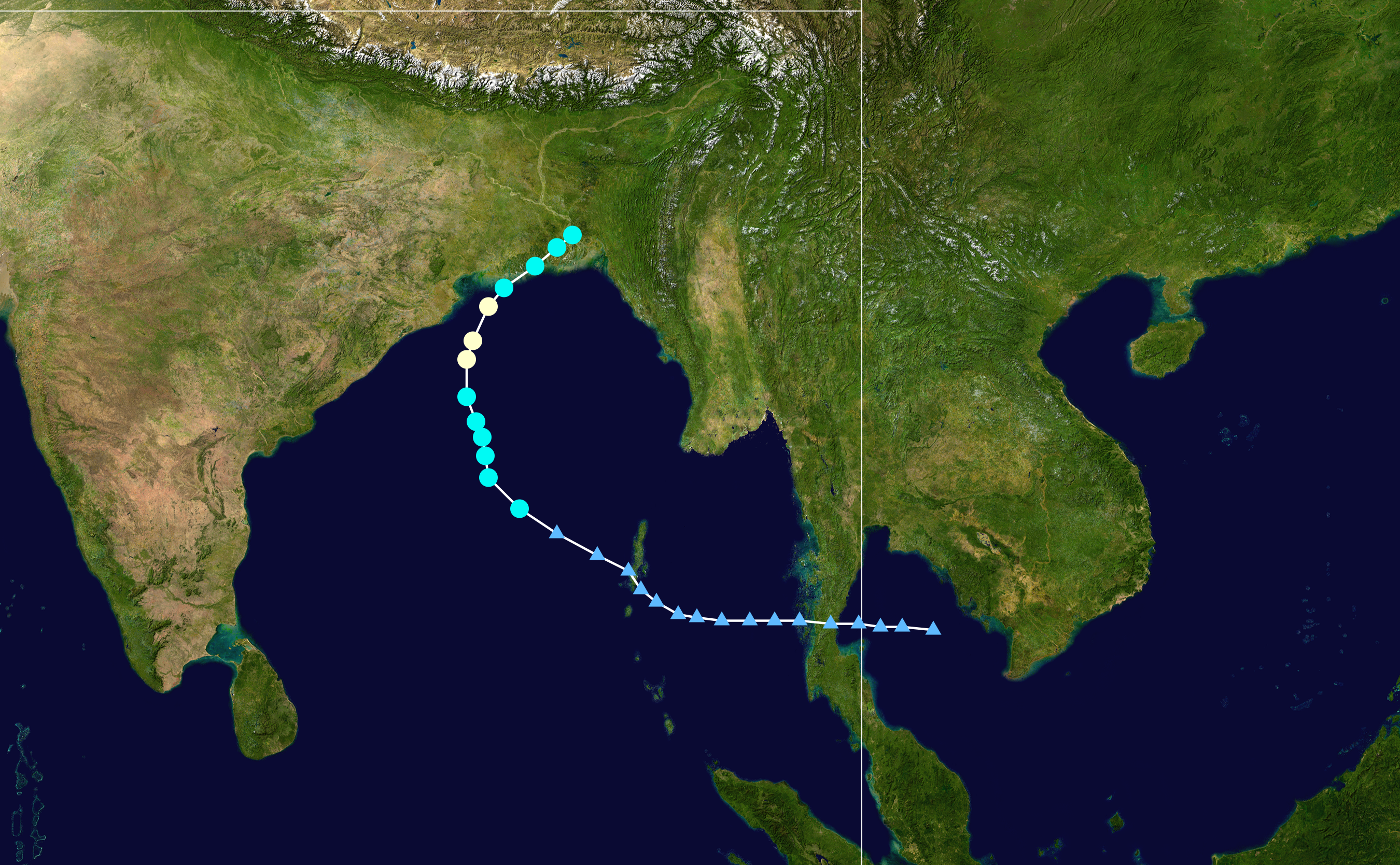
- Duration: November 17 – November 23
- Peak intensity: 120 km/h (75 mph) (3-min); 984 hPa (mbar)

Tropical Storm Chip dissipated over Vietnam on November 15, 1998. The remnants of Chip crossed the Malay Peninsula on November 17 and entered the Bay of Bengal. The system moved along the edge of a subtropical ridge within an area of strong wind shear. After turning towards the northwest, the low entered an area of lower wind shear and began to become better organized. Between November 18 and 20, the JTWC issued three TCFAs before issuing first advisory on Tropical Cyclone 07B early on November 20. While recurving towards the northeast, 07B reached its peak intensity on November 22 with winds of 140 km/h (87 mph). Shortly after reaching peak intensity, the cyclone entered an area of strong wind shear which caused convection associated with the storm to become dislocated from the center. This caused 07B to rapidly weaken before making landfall to the west of Chittagong, Bangladesh. It dissipated on November 23.

Tropical Cyclone 07B produced a storm surge of 1.2 to 2.4 m (3.9 to 7.9 ft) which inundated coastal areas of Bangladesh, killing 40 people and leaving at least 103 others missing. Winds gusting up to 80 km/h (50 mph) and heavy rains impacted a large area of the country. A large area of rice paddies was lost due to flooding and numerous homes were buried in mud. A total of 5,780 families were left homeless. About 8,755 homes sustained severe damage and an estimated 300,000 people were affected by 07B.

=== Severe Cyclonic Storm ARB 06 (08A) ===
- Severe cyclonic storm (IMD)
- Category 1 tropical cyclone (SSHWS)
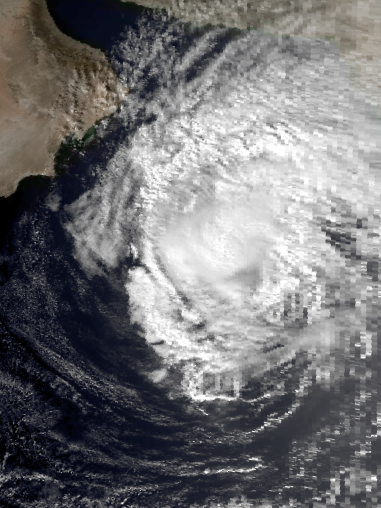
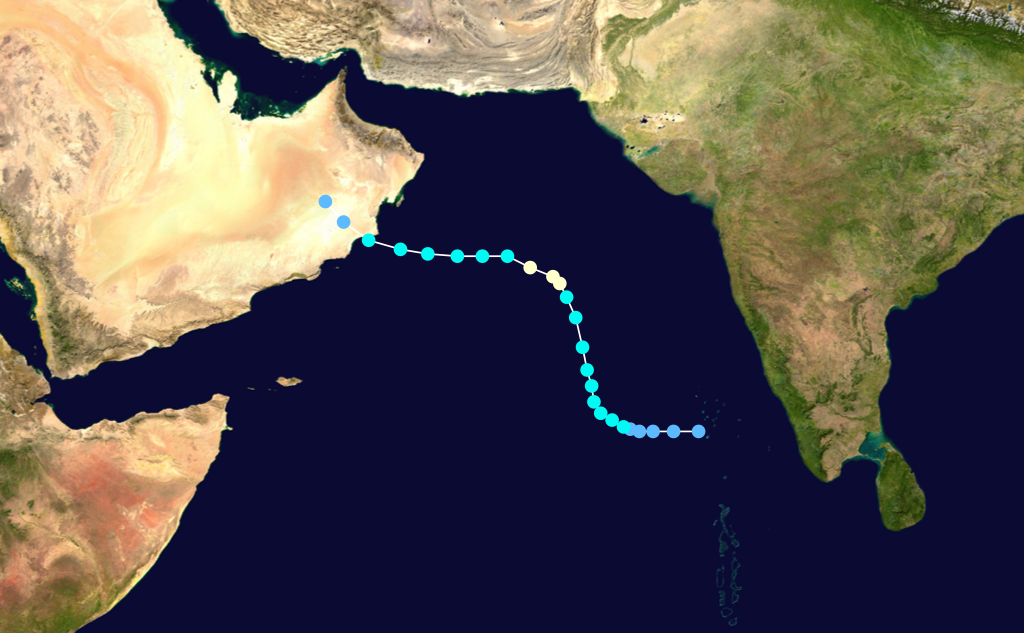
- Duration: December 11 – December 17
- Peak intensity: 100 km/h (65 mph) (3-min); 993 hPa (mbar)

On December 7, a broad area of low pressure developed near southern India within an area of moderate wind shear. On December 11, the JTWC issued a TCFA for the system as it drifted towards the northwest over the Arabian Sea. Two days later, the first advisory on Tropical Cyclone 08A was issued. The large cyclone slowly organized and intensified as it turned towards the north. By December 15, the storm reached its peak intensity with winds of 120 km/h (75 mph). Then, it turned towards the west into an area of higher wind shear. The cyclone gradually weakened as it traveled towards Oman. It made landfall in the country on December 17 with winds of 65 km/h (40 mph) and dissipated later that day. Although it made landfall as a tropical storm, no known damage was reported. The remnants of the storm sank a ship, killing 18 fishermen.

== Season effects ==
This is a table of the storms in 1998 and their landfall(s), if any. Deaths in parentheses are additional and indirect (an example of an indirect death would be a traffic accident), but are still storm-related.

Name	Dates	Peak intensity			Areas affected	Damage (USD)	Deaths	Ref(s).
Name	Dates	Category	Wind speed	Pressure	Areas affected	Damage (USD)	Deaths	Ref(s).
BOB 01	May 17– 20	Severe cyclonic storm	110 km/h (68 mph)	972 hPa (28.70 inHg)	West Bengal, Bangladesh	None	35	
ARB 01	May 28–29	Depression	45 km/h (28 mph)	997 hPa (29.44 inHg)	None	None	None	
ARB 02	June 13–15	Extremely severe cyclonic storm	165 km/h (103 mph)	958 hPa (28.29 inHg)	India	3 billion	4,000–10,000	
BOB 02	June 13–15	Deep Depression	55 km/h (34 mph)	992 hPa (29.29 inHg)	None	None	None	
ARB 03	September 30 – October 1	Depression	45 km/h (28 mph)	997 hPa (29.44 inHg)	None	None	None	
ARB 04	October 6–9	Deep Depression	55 km/h (34 mph)	998 hPa (29.47 inHg)	None	None	None	
ARB 05	October 11–18	Cyclonic storm	65 km/h (40 mph)	996 hPa (29.41 inHg)	India	None	None	
BOB 03	October 13–15	Deep Depression	55 km/h (34 mph)	998 hPa (29.47 inHg)	India		101	
BOB 04	October 26–29	Deep depression	55 km/h (34 mph)	1,002 hPa (29.59 inHg)	Andrah Pradesh			
BOB 05	November 13–16	Very severe cyclonic storm	145 km/h (90 mph)	982 hPa (29.00 inHg)	India	20.7 million	6	
BOB 06	November 16–23	Very severe cyclonic storm	120 km/h (75 mph)	984 hPa (29.06 inHg)	Bangladesh		40	
ARB 06	December 11–17	Severe cyclonic storm	100 km/h (62 mph)	993 hPa (29.32 inHg)	Oman		18	
Season aggregates
12 Systems	May 17 –December 17		165 km/h (103 mph)	958 hPa (28.29 inHg)		>$3.02 billion	4,233–10,233	

== See also ==
- Tropical cyclones in 1998
- 1998 Atlantic hurricane season
- 1998 Pacific hurricane season
- 1998 Pacific typhoon season
- South-West Indian Ocean cyclone seasons: 1997–98, 1998–99
- Australian region cyclone seasons: 1997–98, 1998–99
- South Pacific cyclone seasons: 1997–98, 1998–99
