= 1998 Andhra Pradesh cyclone =

North Indian Ocean cyclone in 1998

Deep Depression BOB 03
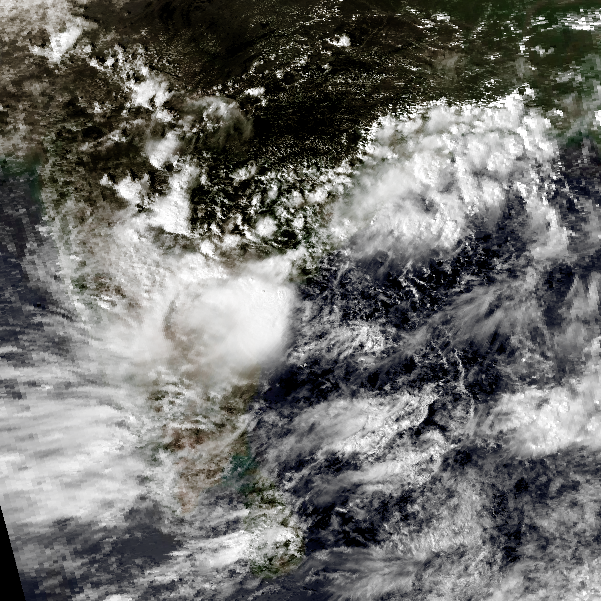
- The cyclone near peak intensity.

Meteorological history
- Formed: October 13, 1998
- Dissipated: October 15, 1998

Deep depression
- 3-minute sustained (IMD)
- Highest winds: 55 km/h (35 mph)
- Lowest pressure: 998 hPa (mbar); 29.47 inHg

Overall effects
- Fatalities: 101
- Damage: ₹6 billion
- Areas affected: India
- IBTrACS
- Part of the 1998 North Indian Ocean cyclone season

The 1998 Andhra Pradesh cyclone was a weak but deadly tropical depression which impacted India, especially the state of Andhra Pradesh, in October 1998. The eighth depression and seventh deep depression of the 1998 North Indian Ocean cyclone season, BOB 03 developed from a low-pressure area in the Bay of Bengal on October 13. The next day, it made landfall near peak intensity. Rapidly weakening once inland, the depression dissipated the next day.

== Meteorological history ==
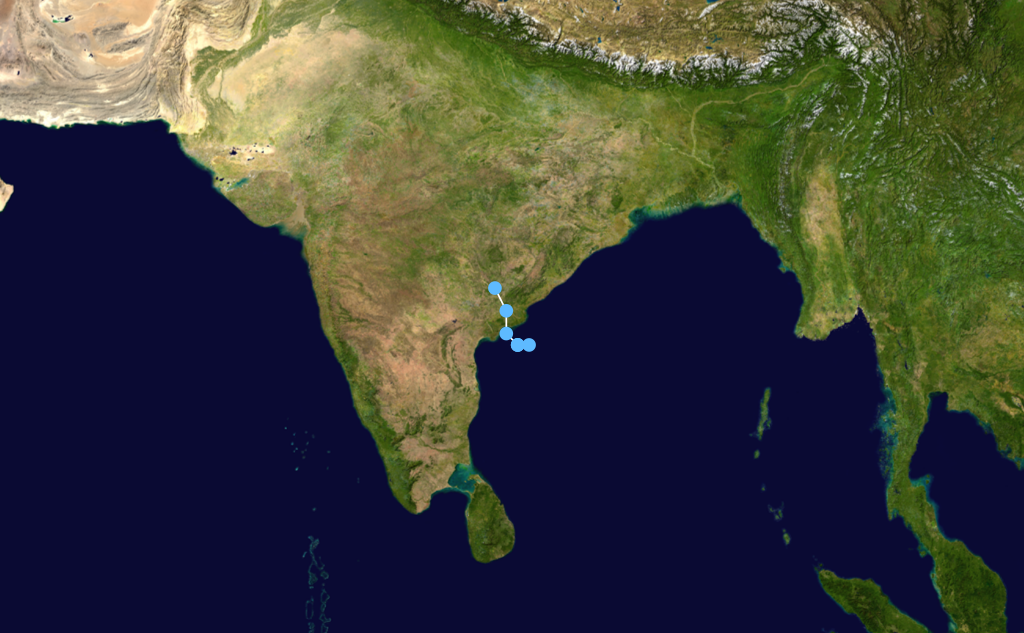
Map plotting the storm's track and intensity, according to the Saffir–Simpson scale Map key Saffir–Simpson scale Tropical depression (≤38 mph, ≤62 km/h) Tropical storm (39–73 mph, 63–118 km/h) Category 1 (74–95 mph, 119–153 km/h) Category 2 (96–110 mph, 154–177 km/h) Category 3 (111–129 mph, 178–208 km/h) Category 4 (130–156 mph, 209–251 km/h) Category 5 (≥157 mph, ≥252 km/h) Unknown Storm type Tropical cyclone Subtropical cyclone Extratropical cyclone, remnant low, tropical disturbance, or monsoon depression

On October 13, a low-pressure area spawned in the monsoonal shear zone over the Bay of Bengal on October 13. Later that day, the India Meteorological Department (IMD) began monitoring the low off the eastern coast of India, designating it as BOB 03 since it was in the Bay of Bengal. On 18:00 UTC that day, BOB 03 would intensify into a deep depression, peaking with 3-minute sustained winds of 35 mph (56 km/h). On 16:00 UTC the next day, it would make landfall near Narsapur, Andhra Pradesh. Once inland, BOB 03 would rapidly weaken, weakening into a depression two hours later. The system would be last noted by the IMD on 00:00 UTC on October 15, dissipating around that time.

== Preparations and impact ==
Since the depression was weak when it affected land, it mainly produced heavy rainfall, which damaged croplands and property. Daily rainfall totals reached 110 mm (4.3 in) in some areas, triggering flash flooding in areas previously affected by heavy rainfall. Due to the depression, the Kalingapatnam weather station recorded 120 mm (4.7 in) in rainfall on October 14, while the Avanigadda weather station recorded 150 mm (5.9 in) in rainfall on October 15.

During the morning of October 14, the Srisailam Dam overflowed, inundating a nearby powerhouse and forcing officials to shut down the plant. The following day, the water level of the dam kept rising, causing nearly 53,000 residents in the area to be evacuated. In Hyderabad, schools and government offices were closed. Numerous highways were also closed due to flowing water. In total, the depression caused 101 fatalities and ₹60 crore (equivalent to ₹295 crore or US$31 million in 2026), in damages. It also submerged 50 bridges and damage 52,657 acres of crops.

== See also ==
- Deep Depression ARB 02 (2008) - deep depression that caused immense damage in Yemen.
- 1996 Andhra Pradesh cyclone - very intense cyclonic storm which also impacted Andhra Pradesh.
