= B. V. Raju =

Indian industrialist

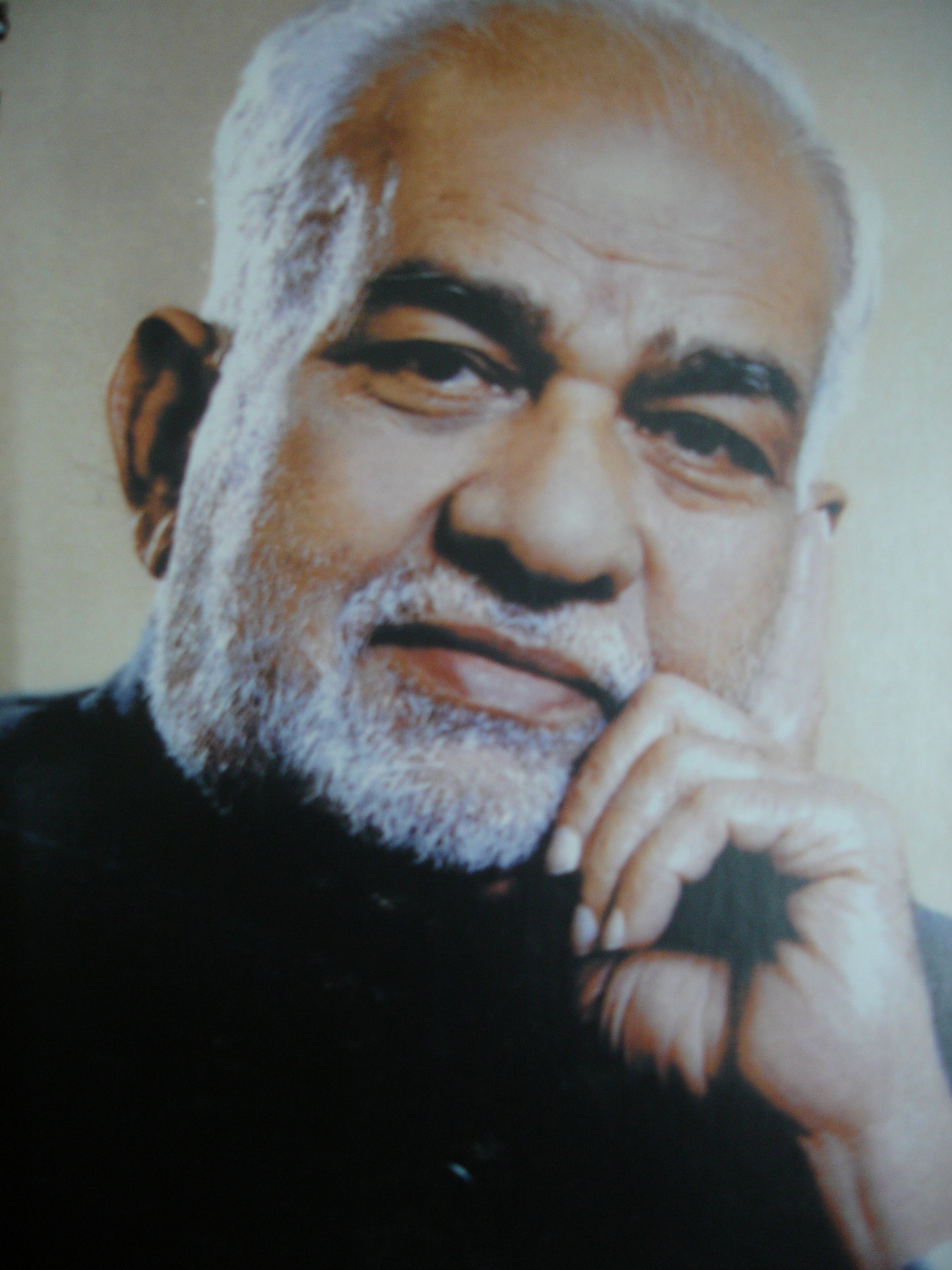
- Bhupathiraju Vissam Raju
- Born: 15 October 1920; Kumudavalli, Andhra Pradesh
- Died: 8 June 2002 (aged 81)
- Occupation: Industrialist
- Children: 3 daughters
- Awards: Padma Shri; Padma Bhushan

Bhupathiraju Vissam Raju (1920–2002) was an Indian industrialist, and the founder of Raasi Cements & Sri Vishnu Cements. He was also the former chairman of Cement Corporation of India and was considered as one of the pioneers of Indian cement industry.

He established Sri Vishnu Educational Society (SVES) in 1992. Starting in 1997, he founded two engineering colleges, a dental college and hospital, a college of pharmacy, a computer education college, a polytechnic, and several schools, and he is also the founder of the B.V Raju Institute of Technology. The Government of India awarded him the fourth-highest Indian civilian award, the Padma Shri, in 1977 and followed it with the third-highest honour, the Padma Bhushan, in 2001.

In his book India's New Capitalists, Harish Damodaran identifies B.V. Raju as a significant figure in the cement sector who managed a production capacity of 3 million tonnes through Raasi Cement and Sri Vishnu Cement. This tenure concluded following a notable hostile takeover in 1998, when India Cements Limited initiated an open offer after securing an initial 18% stake through market purchases and a private sale from a relative of Raju. While the acquisition attempt initially drew public opposition from regional business leaders under the banner of "Telugu pride," the conflict ended when Raju negotiated a divestment of his holdings in April 1998. He subsequently exited Sri Vishnu Cement in 1999, marking the transition of the Raasi group from a leading industrial force to a marginalised one.
