= Pīlu =

Pīlu (from Sanskrit पीलु pīlu) is the common name of two species of tree (Careya arborea orﾠ Salvadora persica).

Mentioned in Mahābhārata.

The name may also refer to the fruit of Pīlu tree, or to the blossoms of Saccharum sara.
