= Pharmaceutical engineering =

Branch of engineering regarding drugs

Pharmaceutical engineering is a branch of engineering focused on discovering, formulating, and manufacturing medication, analytical and quality control processes, and on designing, building, and improving manufacturing sites that produce drugs. It utilizes the fields of chemical engineering, biomedical engineering, pharmaceutical sciences, and industrial engineering.

== History ==
Humans have a long history of using derivatives of natural resources, such as plants, as medication. However, it was not until the late 19th century when the technological advancements of chemical companies were combined with medical research that scientists began to manipulate and engineer new medications, drug delivery techniques, and methods of mass production.

=== Synthesizing new medications ===
One of the first prominent examples of an engineered, synthetic medication was made by Paul Erlich. Erlich had found that Atoxyl, an arsenic-containing compound which is harmful to humans, was very effective at killing Treponema pallidum, the bacteria which causes syphilis. He hypothesized that if the structure of Atoxyl was altered, a "magic bullet" could potentially be identified which would kill the parasitic bacteria without having any adverse effects on human health. He developed many compounds stemming from the chemical structure of Atoxyl and eventually identified one compound which was the most effective against syphilis while being the least harmful to humans, which became known as Salvarsan. Salvarsan was widely used to treat syphilis within years of its discovery.

=== Beginning of mass production ===
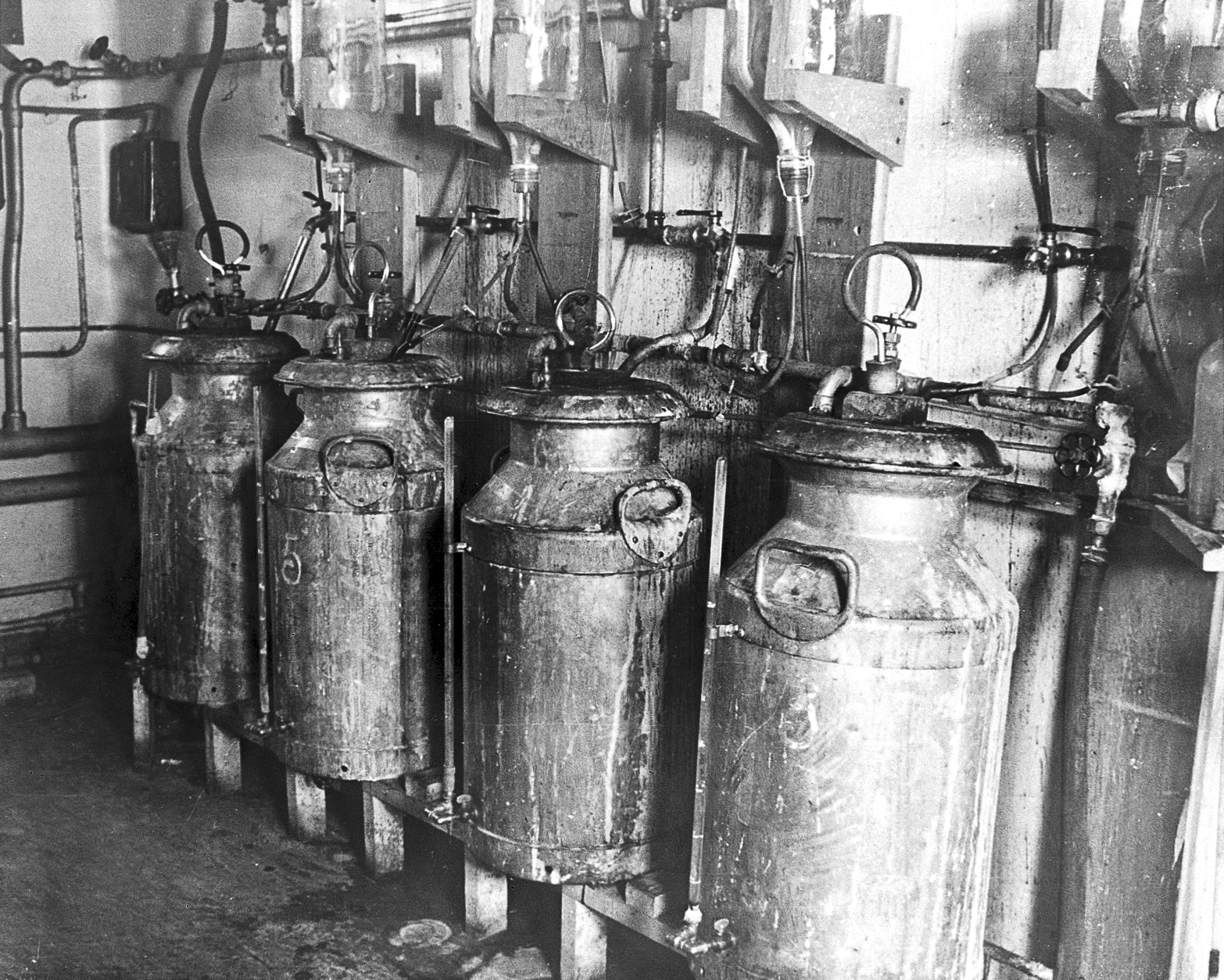
Equipment for deep-fermentation of penicillin

In 1928, Alexander Fleming discovered a mold named Penicillium chrysogenum which prevented many types of bacteria from growing. Scientists identified the potential of this mold to provide treatment in humans against bacteria which cause infections. During World War II, the United Kingdom and the United States worked together to find a method of mass-producing penicillin, a derivative of the Penicillium mold, which had the potential to save many lives during the war since it could treat infections common in injured soldiers. Although penicillin could be isolated from the mold in a laboratory setting, there was no known way to obtain the amount of medication needed to treat the quantity of people who needed it. Scientists with major chemical companies such as Pfizer were able to develop a deep-fermentation process which could produce a high yield of penicillin. In 1944, Pfizer opened the first penicillin factory, and its products were exported to aid the war efforts overseas.

=== Controlled drug release ===
Tablets for oral consumption of medication have been utilized since approximately 1500 B.C.; however, for a long time the only method of drug release was immediate release, meaning all of the medication is released in the body at once. In the 1950s, sustained release technology was developed. Through mechanisms such as osmosis and diffusion, pills were designed that could release the medication over a 12-hour to 24-hour period. Smith, Kline & French developed one of the first major successful sustained release technologies. Their formulation consisted of a collection of small tablets taken at the same time, with varying amounts of wax coating that allowed some tablets to dissolve in the body faster than others. The result was a continuous release of the drug as it travelled through the intestinal tract. Although modern day research focuses on extending the controlled release timescale to the order of months, once-a-day and twice-a-day pills are still the most widely utilized controlled drug release method.

=== Formation of the ISPE ===
In 1980, the International Society for Pharmaceutical Engineering was formed to support and guide professionals in the pharmaceutical industry through all parts of the process of bringing new medications to the market. The ISPE writes standards and guidelines for individuals and companies to use and to model their practices after. The ISPE also hosts training sessions and conferences for professionals to attend, learn, and collaborate with others in the field.

== See also ==
- Drug discovery
- Drug development
- Modified-release dosage
- Pharmaceutical manufacturing
- Pharmaceutical industry
