= Narsapur, Medak district =

Narsapur Gandi Narsapuram
- Census Town
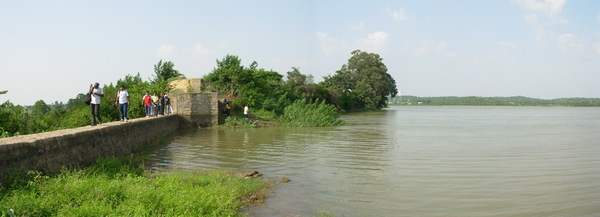
- Narsapur Lake

- Location in Telangana, India Narsapur (India)
- Coordinates: 17°44′19″N 78°16′58″E
- Country: India
- State: Telangana
- District: Medak district
- Established date: 1770

Area
  - Total: 7.20 km^{2} (2.78 sq mi)
- Elevation: 560 m (1,840 ft)

Population (2011)
  - Total: 6,647
  - Density: 923/km^{2} (2,390/sq mi)

Languages
  - Official: Telugu
- Time zone: UTC+5:30 (IST)
- PIN: 502313
- Telephone code: 08458
- Vehicle registration: TS 35
- Website: medak.telangana.gov.in

Narsapur formally Gandi Narsapuram, is a census town in Medak district of the Indian state of Telangana. It is located in Narsapur mandal.

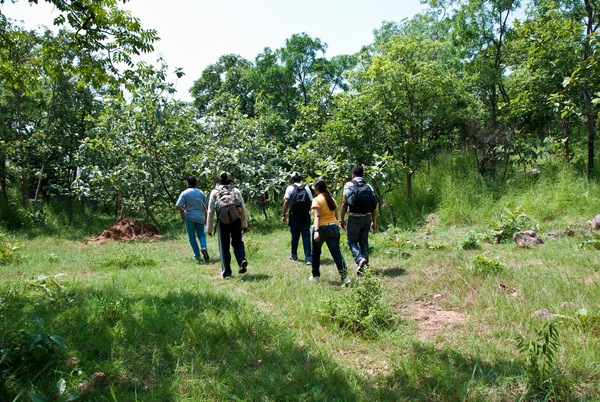
Narsapur Trekking Picture

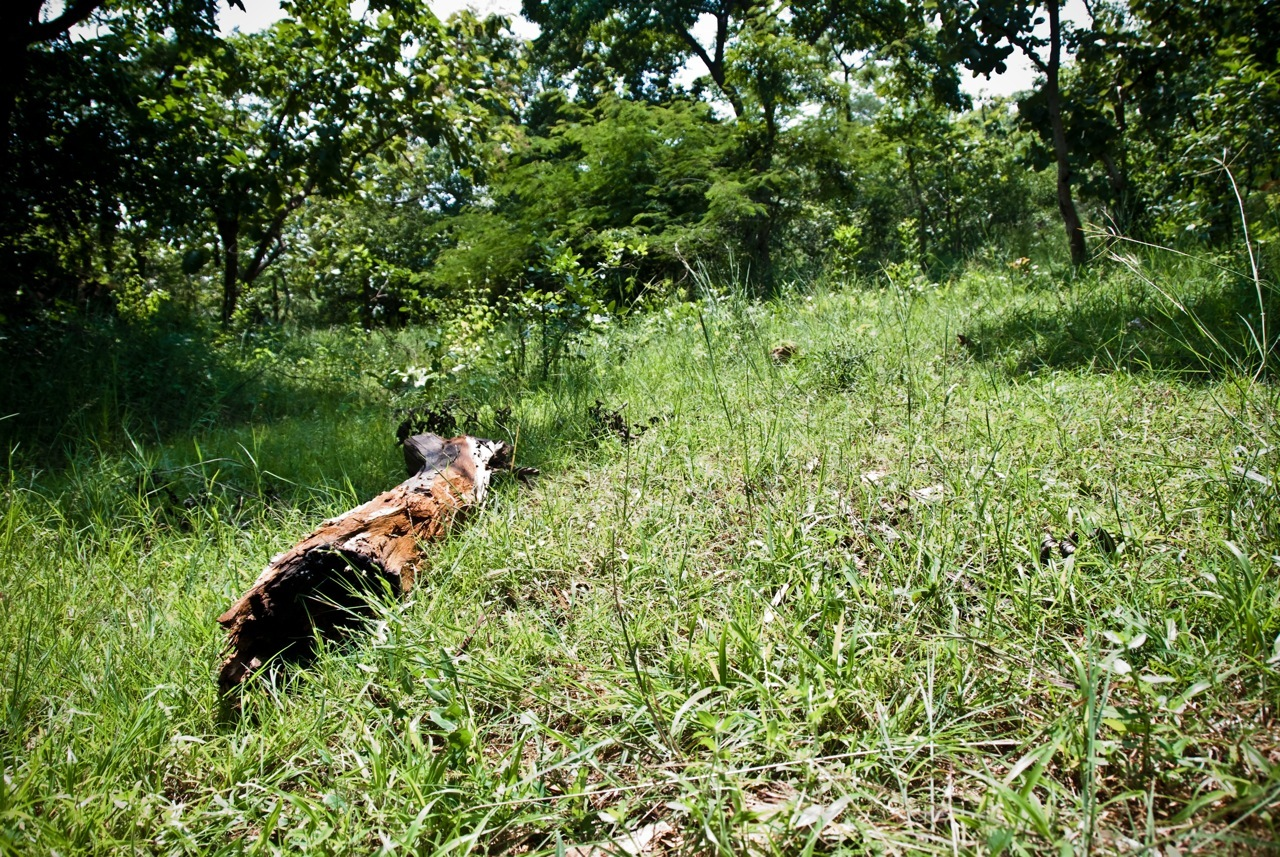
Forest

Narsapur is a Municipality. Narsapur is located 50 km from Hyderabad

== Demographics ==
Telugu is the Local Language. The total population of Narsapur is 14,735. Males account for 7,691 and 7,044 females. 2,733 live in houses. The total area of Narsapur is 2,264 hectares.

== Colleges ==
- Padmasri Dr. B. V. Raju Institute of Technology
- Ellenki Degree College
- Osmania PG College
- DSR Junior College
