= 1998 Pacific typhoon season =

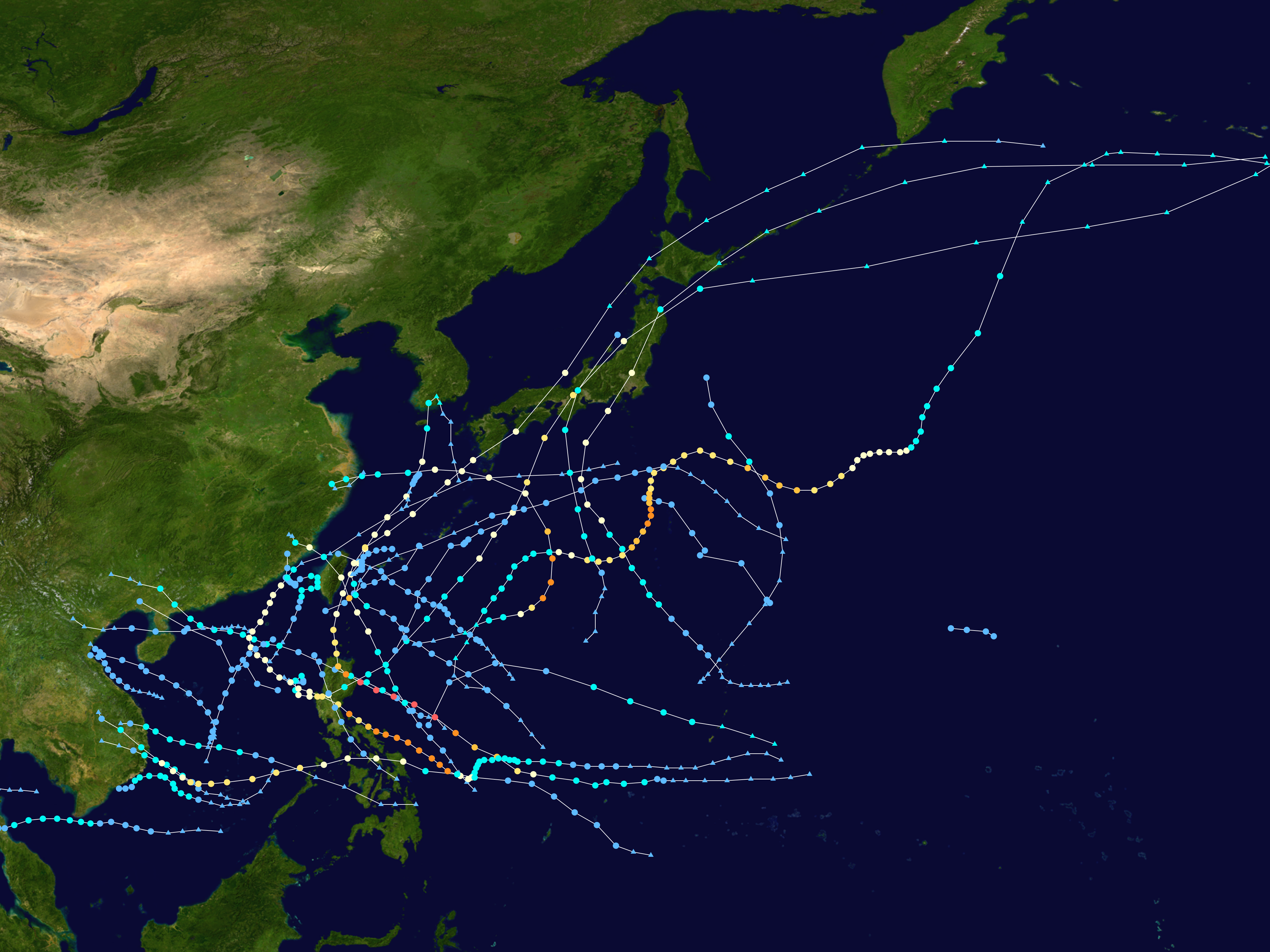
- Season summary map

Seasonal boundaries
- First system formed: May 28, 1998
- Last system dissipated: December 21, 1998

Strongest storm
- Name: Zeb
  - Maximum winds: 205 km/h (125 mph) (10-minute sustained)
  - Lowest pressure: 900 hPa (mbar)

Seasonal statistics
- Total depressions: 31, 2 unofficial
- Total storms: 16
- Typhoons: 8
- Very strong typhoons: 2
- Violent typhoons: 1
- ACE: 152.9 units
- Total fatalities: 967 total
- Total damage: $2.23 billion (1998 USD)

Related articles
- 1998 Atlantic hurricane season; 1998 Pacific hurricane season; 1998 North Indian Ocean cyclone season

The 1998 Pacific typhoon season was the least active Pacific typhoon season on record, until it was surpassed 12 years later. It was also the third-latest starting Pacific typhoon season on record. The season produced 16 tropical storms, 8 strengthening into typhoons. The scope of this article is limited to the Pacific Ocean, north of the equator and west of the International Date Line. Storms that form east of the date line and north of the equator are called hurricanes; see 1998 Pacific hurricane season. Tropical Storms formed in the entire west Pacific basin were assigned a name by the Joint Typhoon Warning Center. Tropical depressions in this basin have the "W" suffix added to their number. Tropical depressions that enter or form in the Philippine area of responsibility are assigned a name by the Philippine Atmospheric, Geophysical and Astronomical Services Administration or PAGASA. This can often result in the same storm having two names.

The 1998 season was very weak compared to the 1997 season; this was due to the strong El Niño in the previous season. During the 1998 season, a total of 28 tropical depressions developed across the western Pacific basin. Of those 28 depressions, a total of 18 strengthened into tropical storms of which 9 further intensified into typhoons. The first tropical cyclone developed on May 28, marking the third latest start to any Pacific typhoon season on record, and the last one dissipated on December 22. The Philippine region also set a record: with only eleven storms forming or moving into its area of responsibility, PAGASA had its quietest season on record, later tying with the 2010 and 2023 seasons. Overall inactivity was caused by an unusually strong La Niña, which also fueled a hyperactive Atlantic hurricane season that year.

== Systems ==
=== Tropical Depression 01W (Akang) ===
- Tropical depression (JMA)
- Tropical depression (SSHWS)
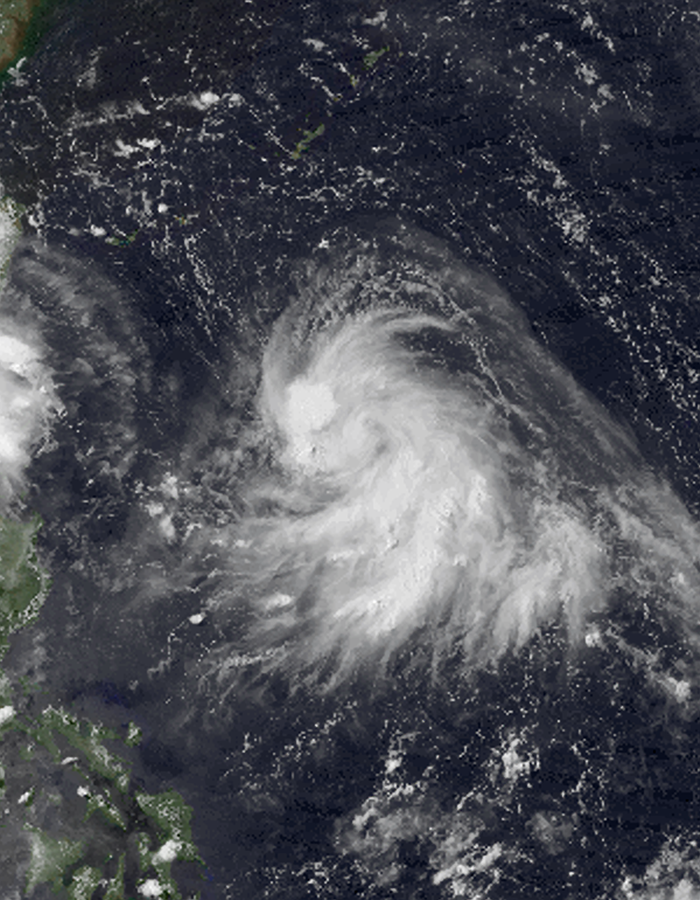
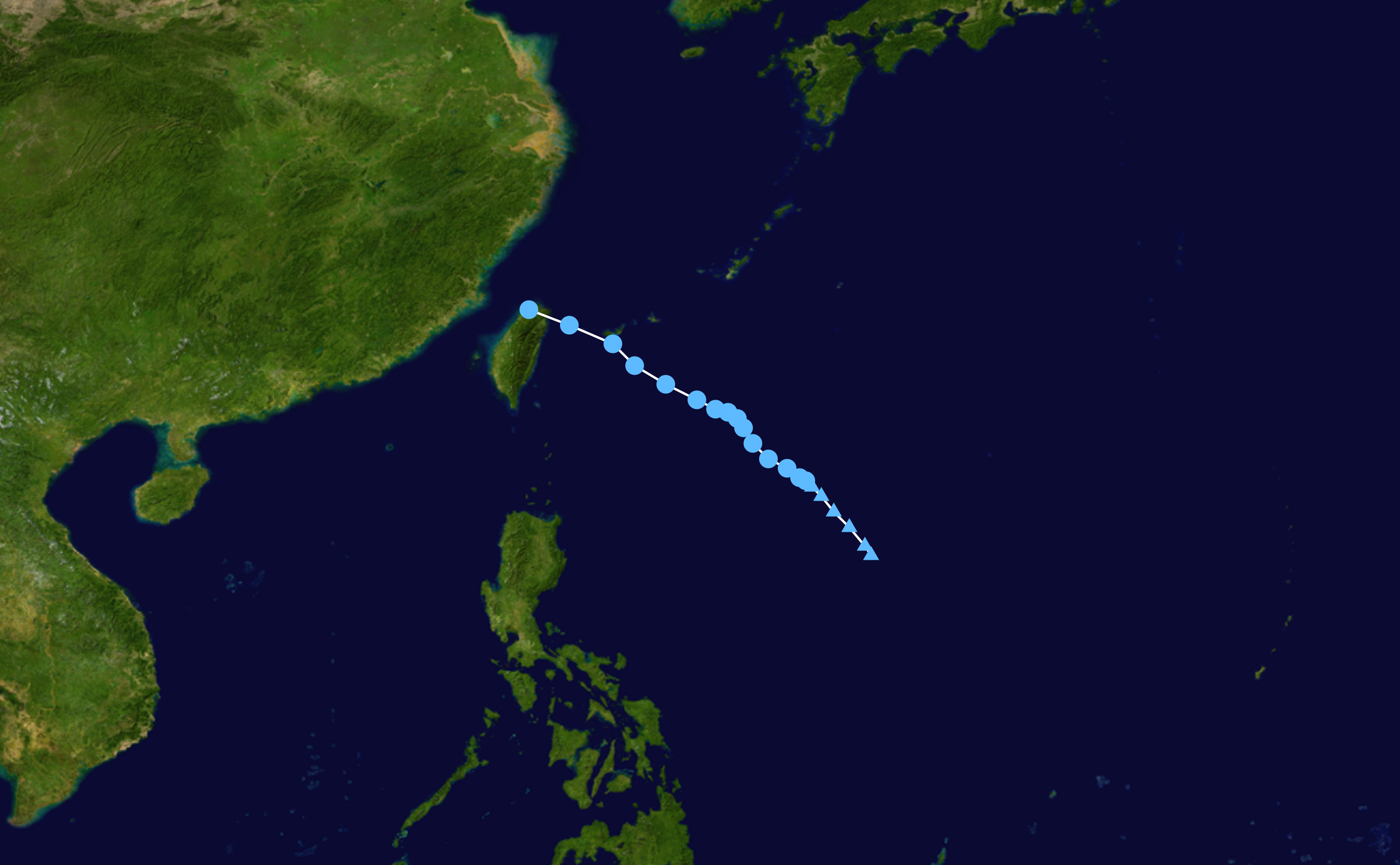
- Duration: July 7 – July 12
- Peak intensity: 55 km/h (35 mph) (10-min); 1002 hPa (mbar)

The second tropical depression of the season developed out of a tropical disturbance which was first noted 1,080 km (670 mi) north-northwest of Palau on July 6. The disturbance gradually became better organized and was classified as Tropical Depression 01W at 1500 UTC on July 7. Upon becoming a depression, it marked the latest start for a Pacific typhoon season since reliable records began in 1959. The next day, 01W entered the Philippine Atmospheric, Geophysical and Astronomical Services Administration (PAGASA) area of responsibility and received the local name Akang. Slowly moving towards the northwest, the depression neared Taiwan. However, increasing vertical wind shear caused the convection associated with the depression to become displaced from the center of circulation. With the center exposed, 01W weakened. At 2100 UTC on July 10, the depression made landfall in northern Taiwan and dissipated shortly after. No known damage was caused by the depression.

=== Tropical Storm Nichole ===
- Tropical storm (JMA)
- Tropical storm (SSHWS)
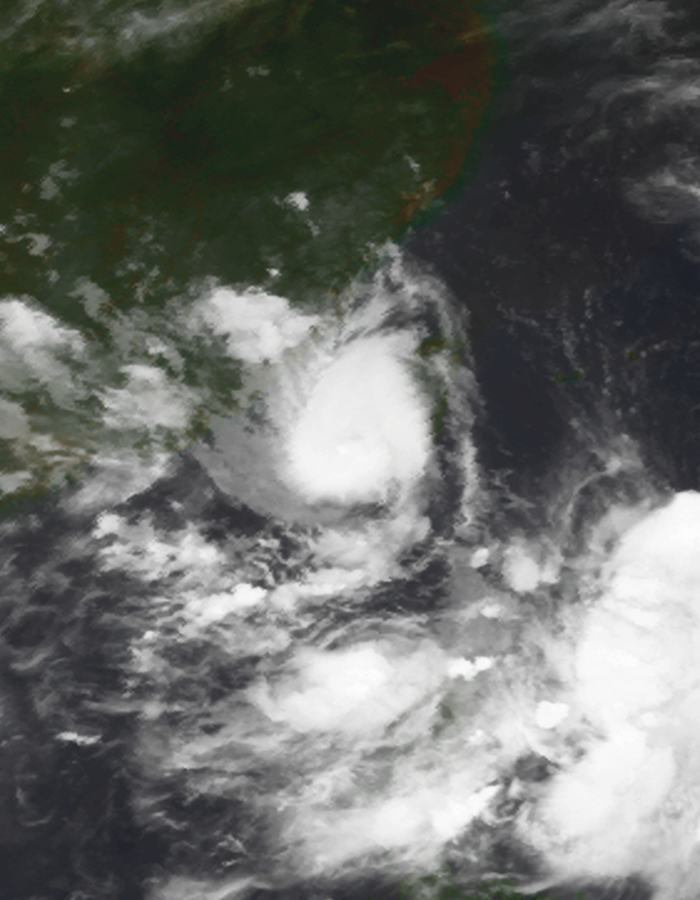
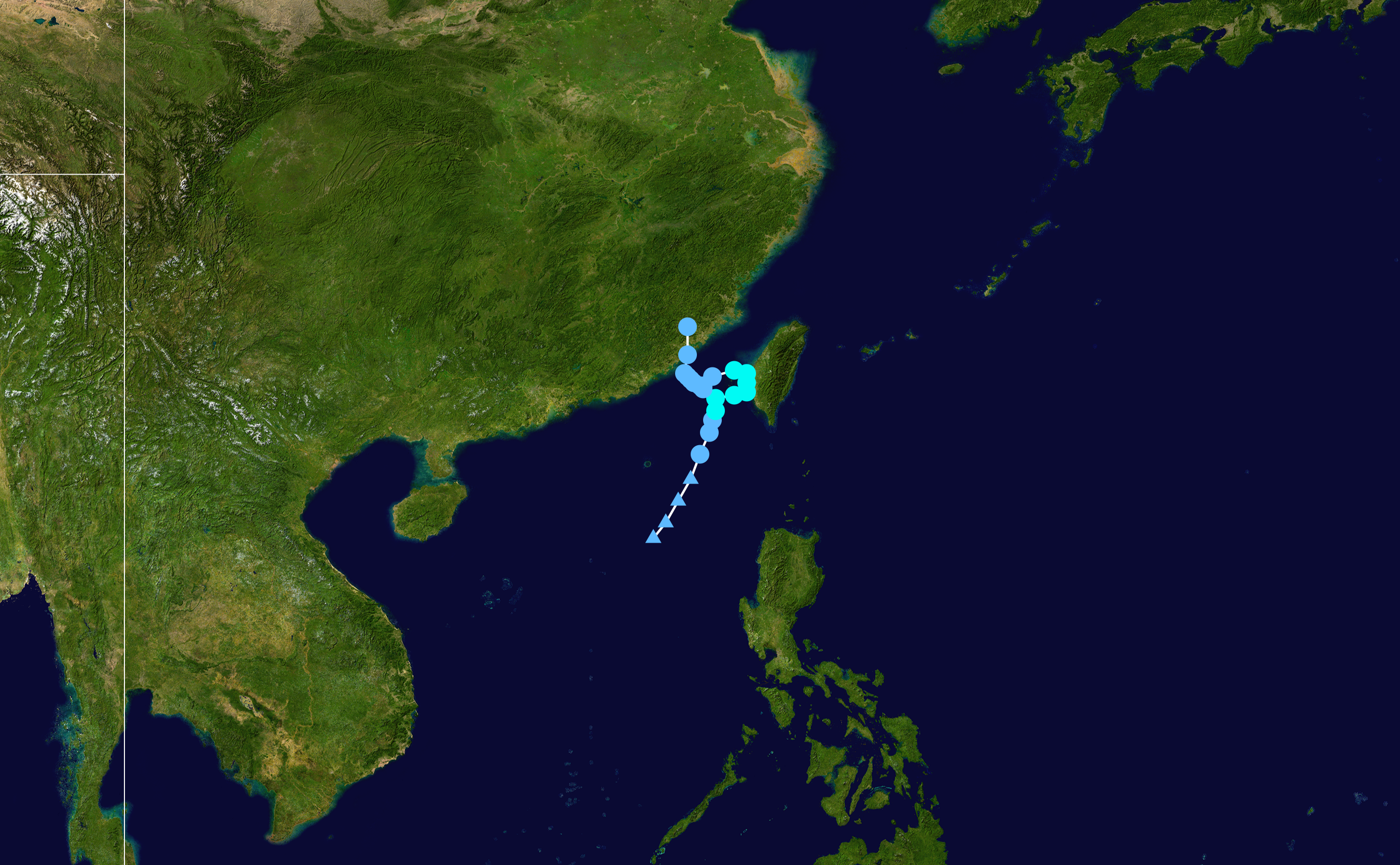
- Duration: July 8 – July 10
- Peak intensity: 65 km/h (40 mph) (10-min); 998 hPa (mbar)

As 01W intensified over the Philippine Sea, a broad area of low pressure developed in the South China Sea. The low slowly intensified as it moved towards the north-northeast and was declared Tropical Depression 02W early on July 8. Tropical Depression 02W slowly strengthened as northerly outflow was constricted. By late on July 8, the depression was upgraded to a tropical storm and given the name Nichole. The storm reached its peak intensity while just offshore southern Taiwan with winds of 95 km/h (60 mph 1-minute winds) according to the Joint Typhoon Warning Center (JTWC) and 65 km/h (40 mph 10-minute winds) with a minimum pressure of 998 hPa (mbar) according to the Japan Meteorological Agency (JMA). The combination of dry air, strong wind shear, and the storm's proximity to land caused Nichole to quickly weaken to a tropical depression twelve hours after reaching its peak intensity. The exposed remnants of Nichole executed a clockwise-loop offshore Taiwan before traveling north into mainland China and dissipating. Rough seas produced by the storm caused four container ships to run aground in Taiwans' Kaohsiung Harbor, none of the crew members were injured. Heavy rains in Taiwan flooded an estimated 2,500 acres (10 km^{2}) of crops.

=== Tropical Depression 03W ===
- Tropical depression (JMA)
- Tropical storm (SSHWS)
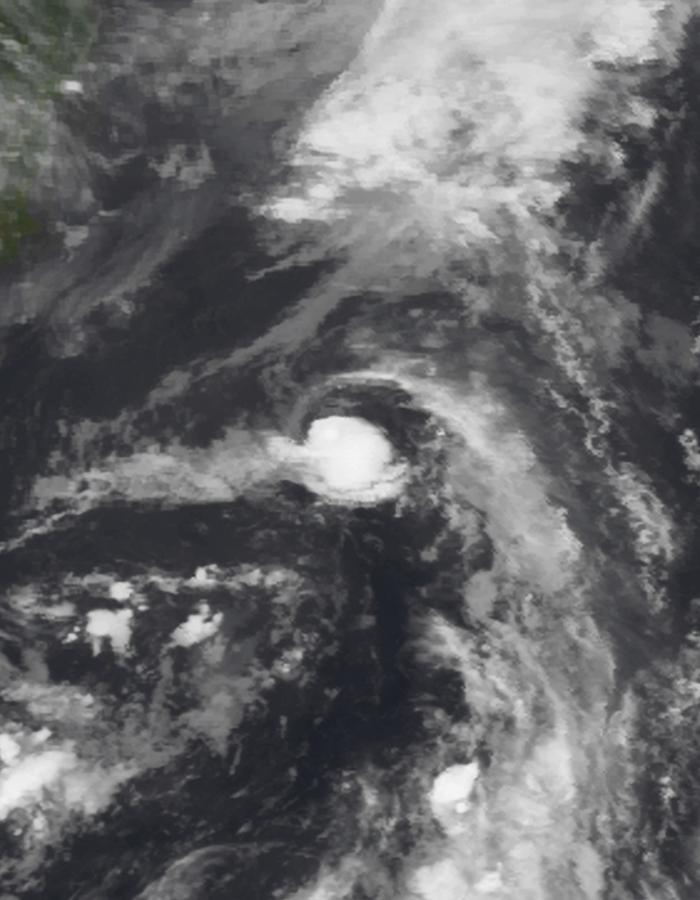
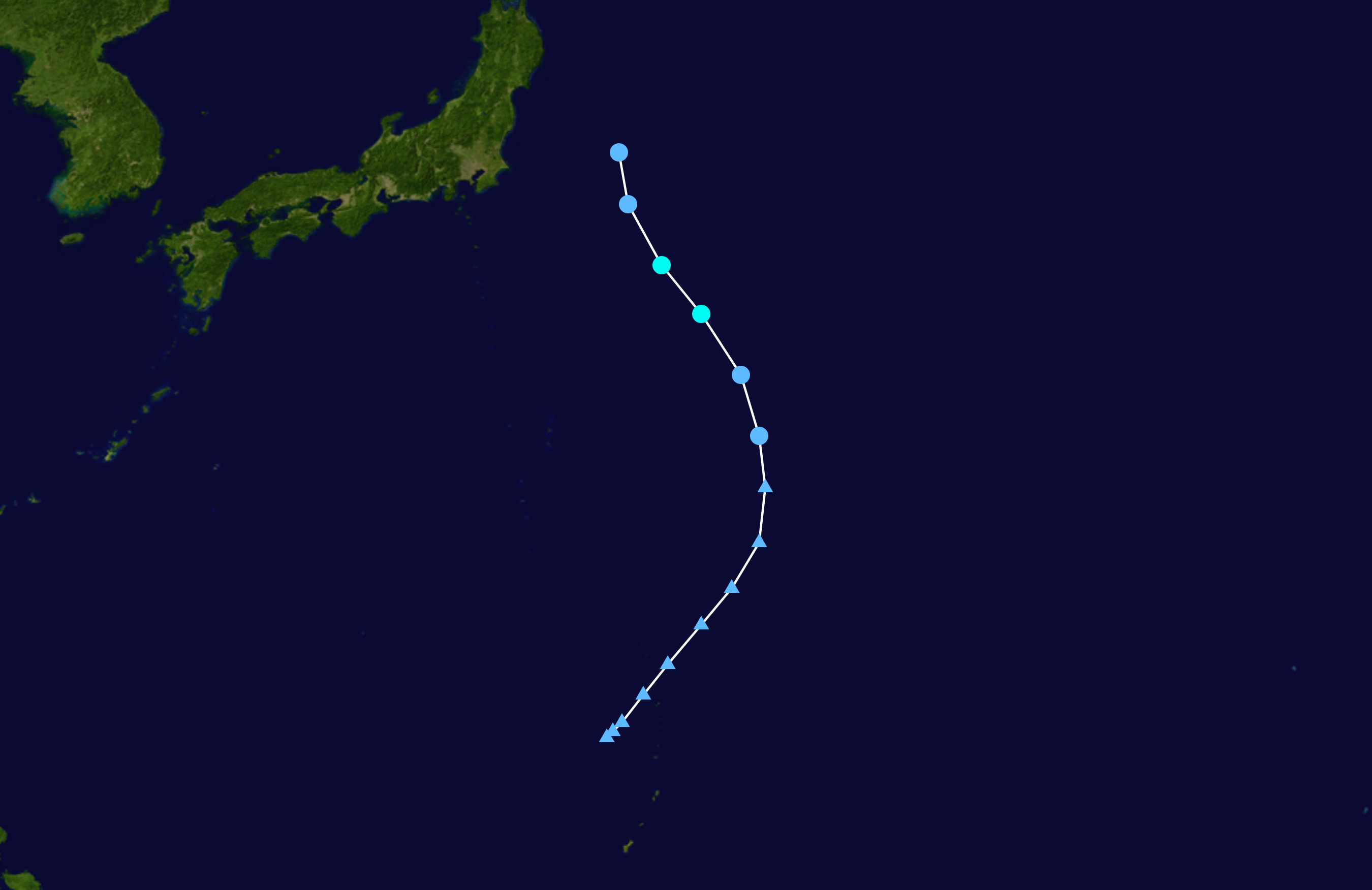
- Duration: July 25 – July 25
- Peak intensity: 55 km/h (35 mph) (10-min); 1008 hPa (mbar)

Operationally considered to have only been a tropical depression, Tropical Storm 03W developed out of a tropical disturbance along the eastern edge of a monsoon gyre on July 22. Tracking in a gradual northwest to northeast curve, the disturbance gradually intensified and was classified as a tropical depression while located 790 km (490 mi) east-northeast of Iwo Jima on July 25. The depression briefly intensified into a tropical storm, with a peak intensity of 85 km/h (50 mph 1-minute winds) as convection wrapped around the entire center of circulation. However, strong wind shear quickly blew away the associated convection, causing 03W to weaken to a tropical depression. Early on July 26, 03W degenerated into an exposed low before dissipating.

=== Typhoon Otto (Bising) ===
- Typhoon (JMA)
- Category 3 typhoon (SSHWS)
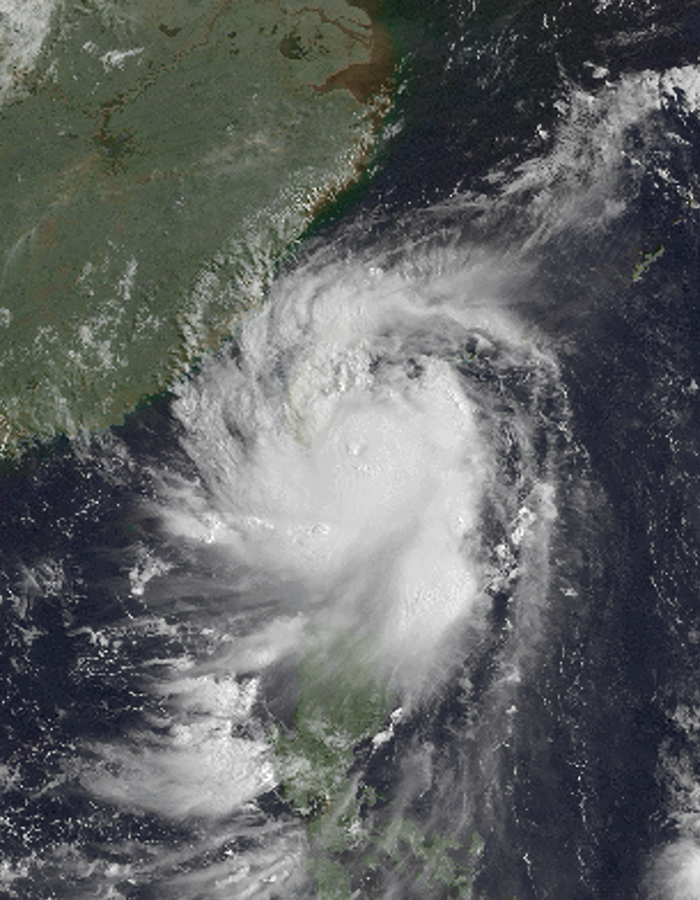
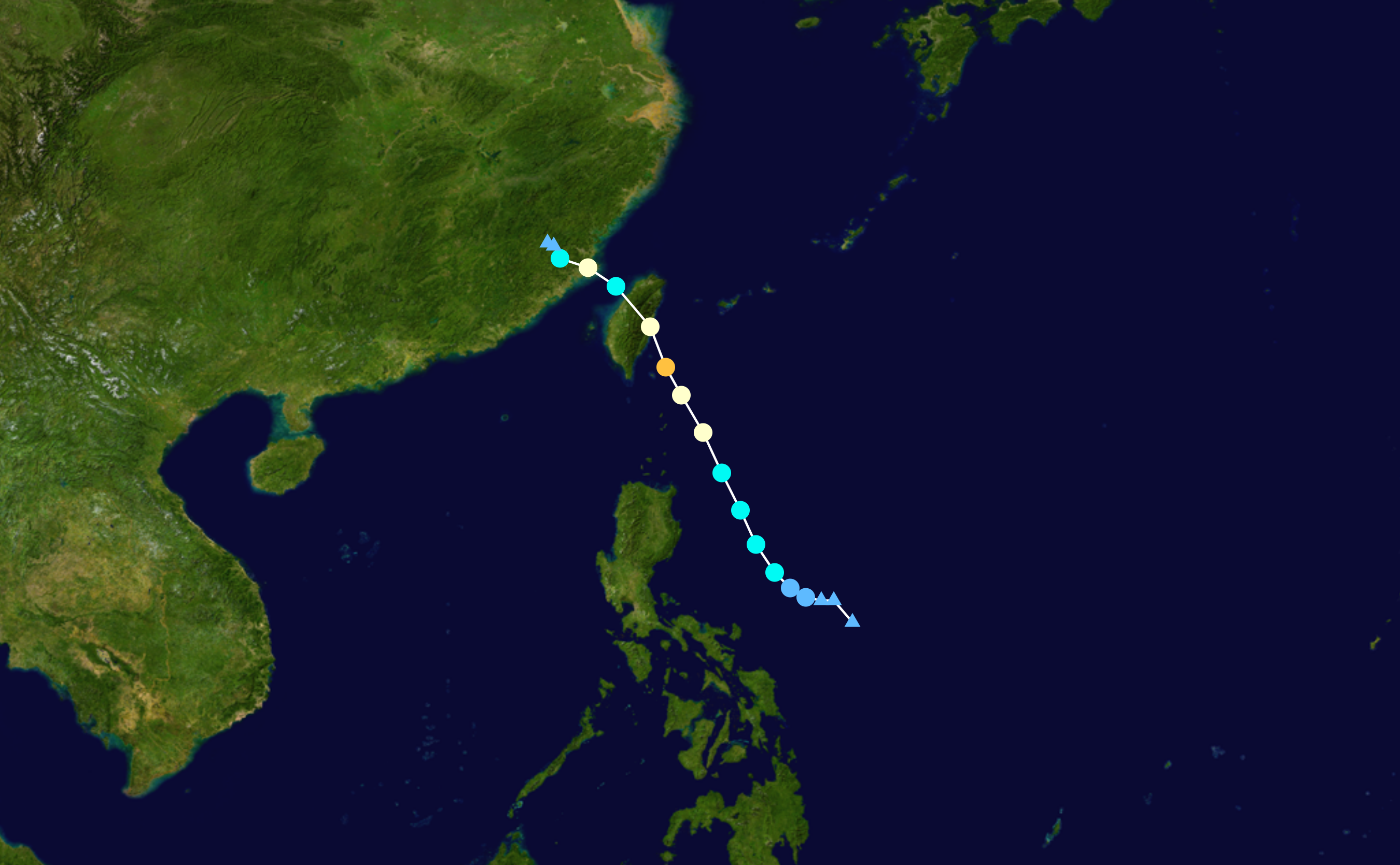
- Duration: August 1 – August 6
- Peak intensity: 120 km/h (75 mph) (10-min); 970 hPa (mbar)

The first typhoon of the season developed out of a tropical low from a mesoscale disturbance in early August. Persistent convection developed around the low and early on August 2, the JTWC began issuing advisories on Tropical Depression 04W.

Storm signals were put in place in the Philippines prior to the storm's arrival on August 3. However, Otto turned away from the country and the signals were discontinued on August 5. Typhoon Otto produced heavy rains, amounting to at least 400 mm (15.7 in) in mountainous areas of Taiwan, caused flooding which killed five people. In all, damages in Taiwan amounted to NTD 25 million ($761,000 1998 USD). After traveling through the Taiwan Strait, the typhoon struck China, producing heavy rainfall which caused flooding in areas suffering from the worst flood in at least 45 years. Officials reported no damage or loss of life resulted from the storm in Fujian Province.

=== Severe Tropical Storm Penny (Klaring) ===
- Severe tropical storm (JMA)
- Tropical storm (SSHWS)
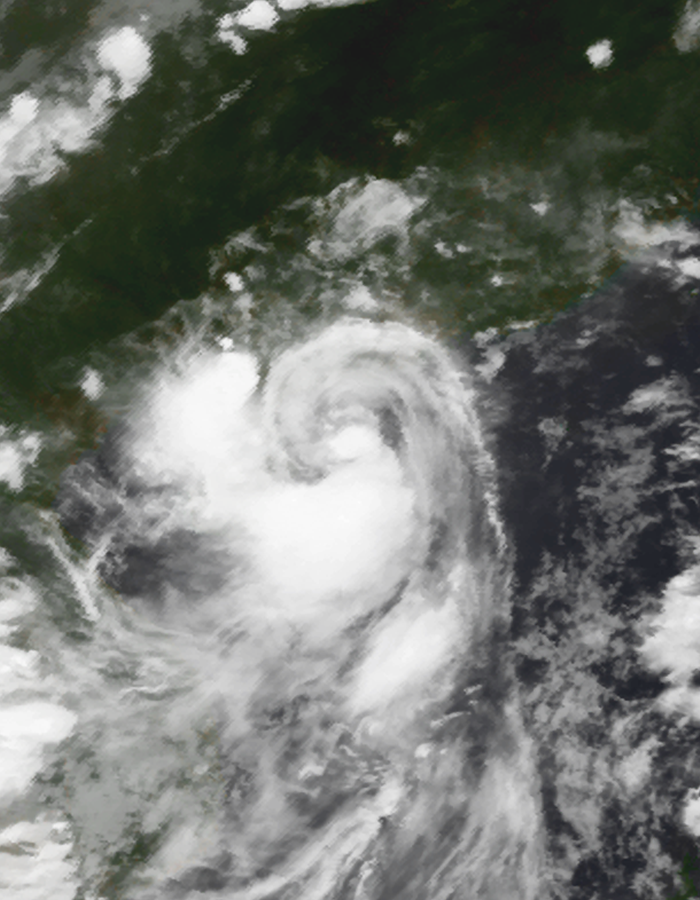
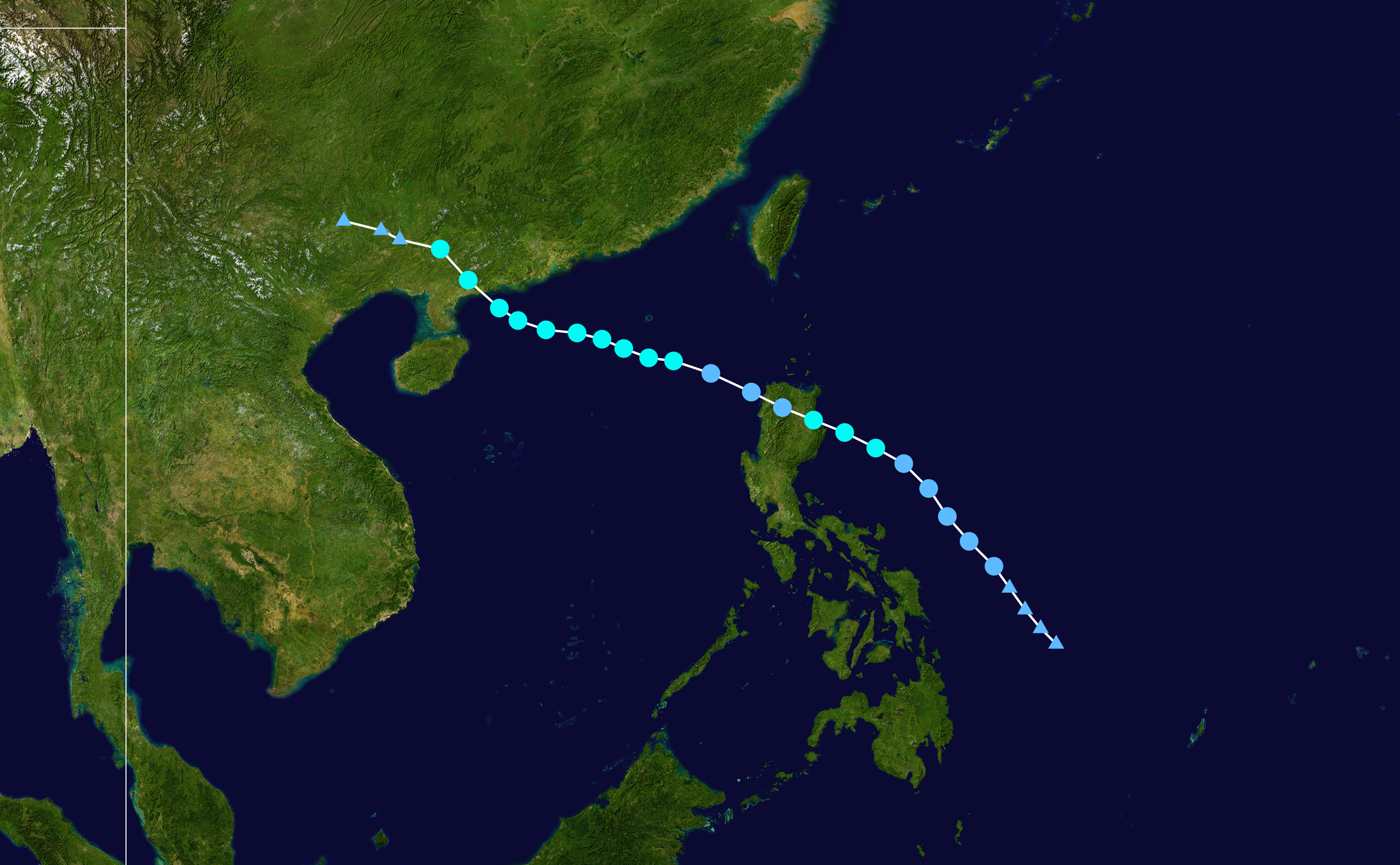
- Duration: August 6 – August 11
- Peak intensity: 95 km/h (60 mph) (10-min); 985 hPa (mbar)

A tropical disturbance formed on August 2 and strengthened into a tropical depression east of the Philippines. As Penny strengthened into a tropical storm, it made landfall over Northern Luzon, on August 7, and drifted into the South China sea on the same day. Strong vertical wind shear on August 8 caused Penny's convection to be displaced to south of the storm, and even exposed the level circulation center for a few hours. Penny was only located 165 kilometers from Hong Kong when it was at its closest distance to Hong Kong, and killed one person in Hong Kong. Penny soon made landfall over Maoming on August 11, and dissipated the next day.

=== Typhoon Rex (Deling) ===
- Typhoon (JMA)
- Category 4 typhoon (SSHWS)
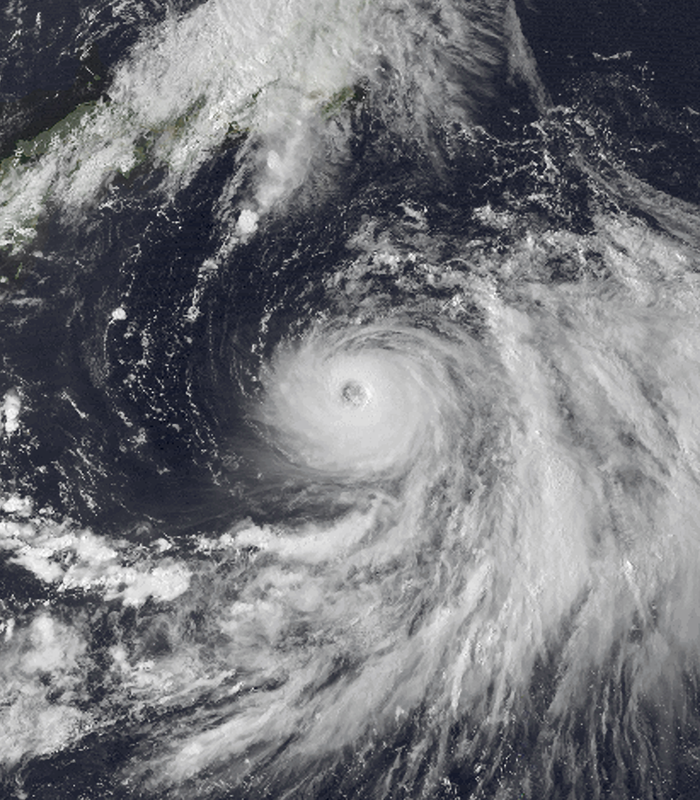
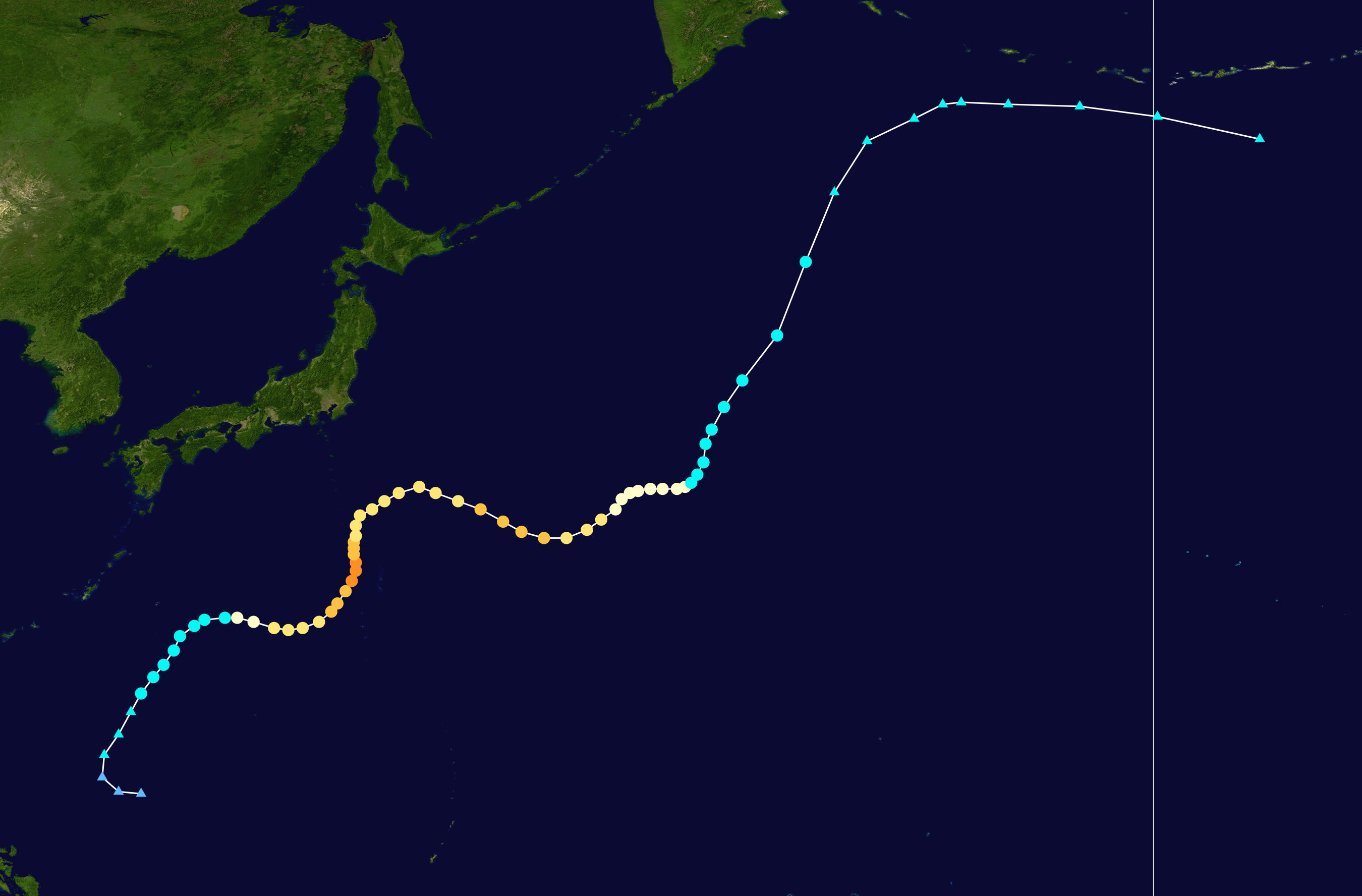
- Duration: August 23 – September 6
- Peak intensity: 140 km/h (85 mph) (10-min); 955 hPa (mbar)

An active Tropical Upper Tropospheric Trough allowed for the development of Tropical Depression 6W on August 22, east of Luzon. It moved westward initially, but as the trough weakened a ridge to the east, it moved northeastward where it became a tropical storm on the 23rd. Rex slowly intensified to become a typhoon on the 26th, followed by reaching a peak of 135 mph (217 km/h) winds on the 28th south of Japan. As it moved northward, it brought heavy flooding to Honshū, Japan, amounting to 13 deaths and moderate damage from mudslides across the island. Another trough pulled the storm eastward, saving Japan from a direct hit, and Rex continued northeastward to an unusually high latitude near 50°, when it became extratropical on the 9th near the Aleutian Islands, east of the International Date Line.

Due to heavy rains caused the weather front and Rex, 25 people were killed, 486 houses were destroyed, 13,927 houses were inundated in Japan. In Tochigi and Fukushima prefectures, experienced particularly heavy rains, with daily precipitation exceeded 600mm in Nasu (August 27). Losses from the fishing industry were ¥4.26 million (US$33,000).

=== Tropical Depression 07W ===
- Tropical depression (JMA)
- Tropical depression (SSHWS)
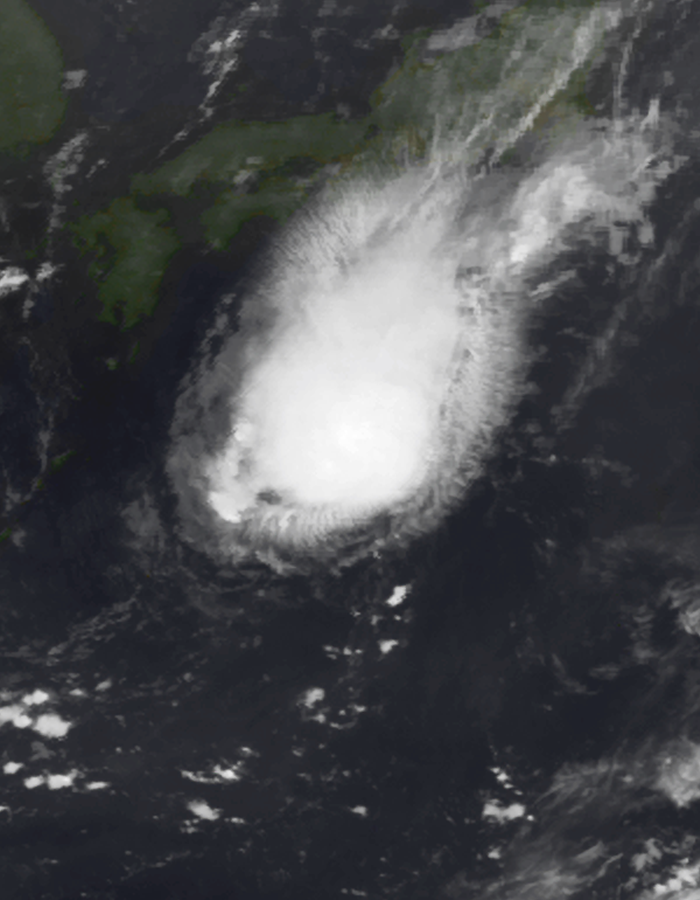
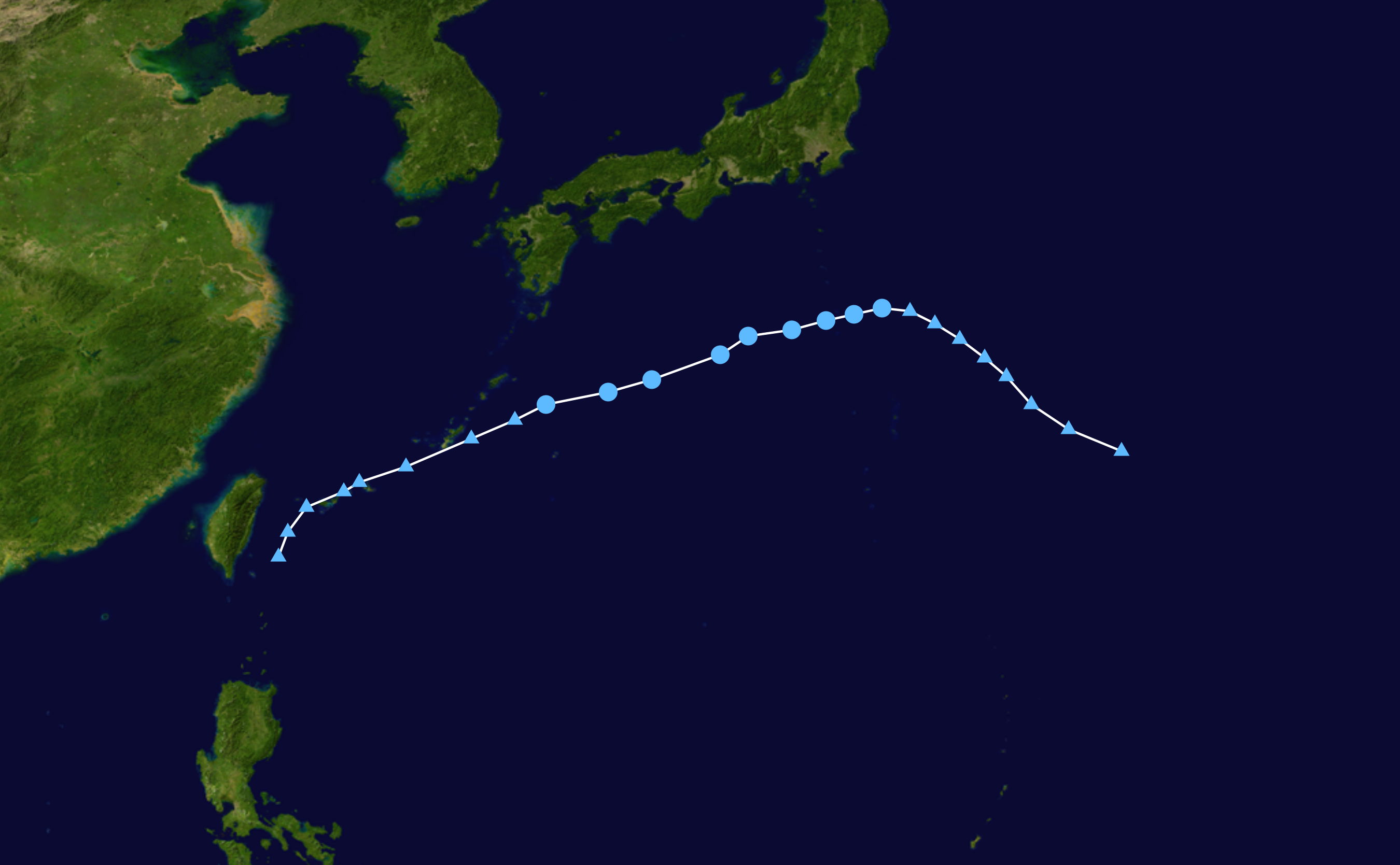
- Duration: August 31 – September 5
- Peak intensity: 55 km/h (35 mph) (10-min); 1002 hPa (mbar)

On August 26, a monsoonal trough formed over central China and drifted south. On August 29, the trough spawned an embedded low over Taiwan, and strengthened into a tropical depression on September 1. Tropical Depression 07W fully dissipated on September 6 due to vertical wind shear.

=== Severe Tropical Storm Stella ===
- Severe tropical storm (JMA)
- Category 1 typhoon (SSHWS)
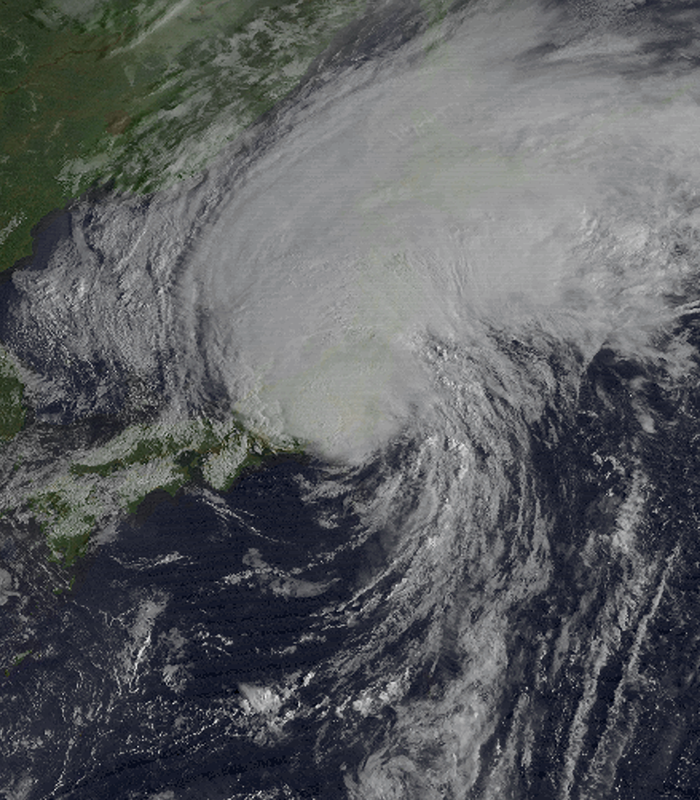
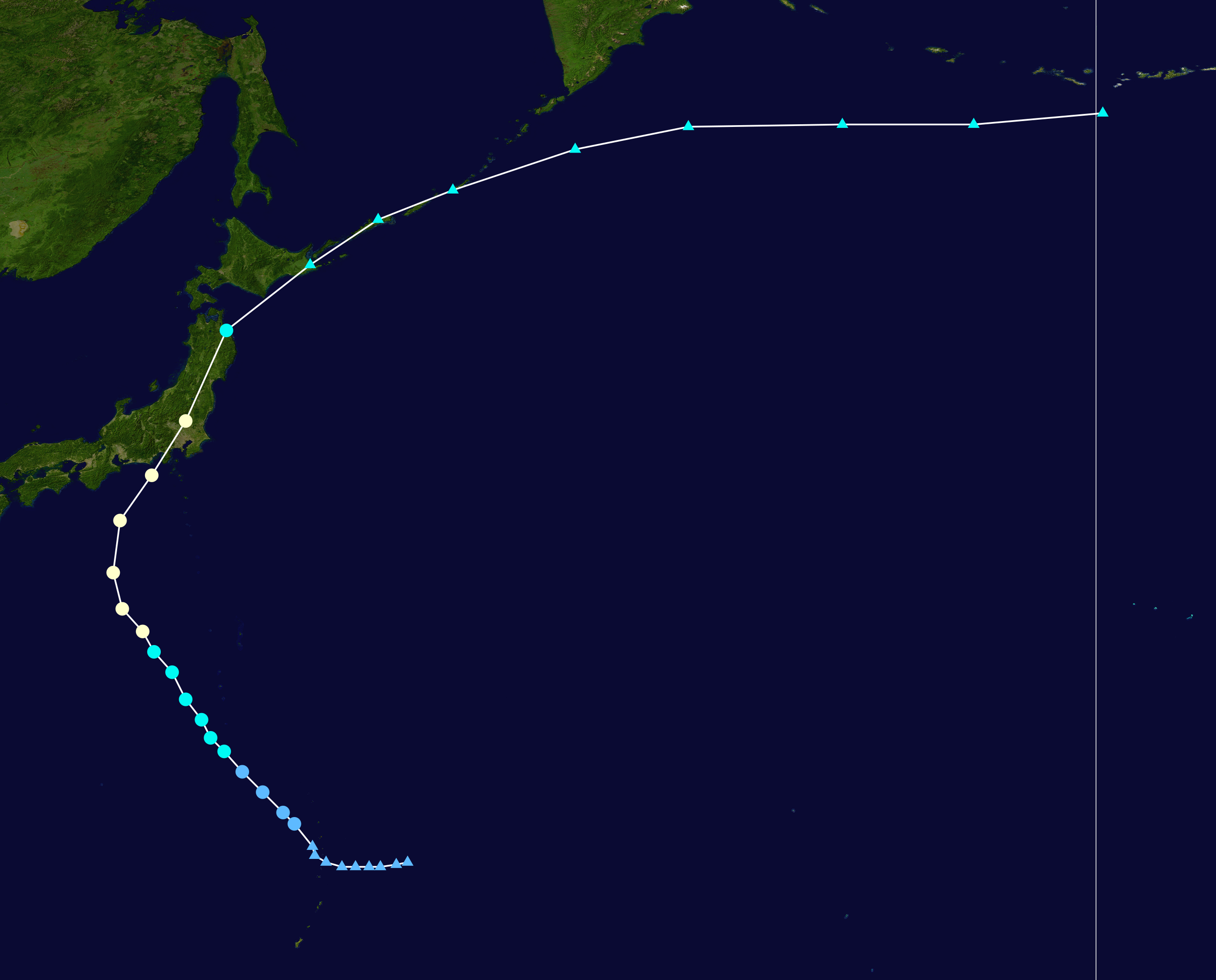
- Duration: September 11 – September 16
- Peak intensity: 110 km/h (70 mph) (10-min); 965 hPa (mbar)

In northern Japan, near Wakkanai, Hokkaidō, severe damage to many homes took place. One person in the region was killed after being blown off his roof while trying to repair it and twelve homes were destroyed. Several rivers overflowed their banks after rainfall exceeding 200 mm (7.9 in) fell across Hokkaidō. Throughout Sōya Subprefecture, agricultural and fishing industry losses amounted to 23.1 million yen (US$171,213). Severe flooding took place in nearby Abashiri Subprefecture where hundreds of homes were inundated after rivers broke their banks. Over 6,200 ha (15,000 acres) of farmland was lost. Large sections of roadways were washed away, including 14 bridges. Total losses in Abashiri reached 25 million yen (US$185,296), much of which was due to fishing industry damage.

Severe damage was sustained in Iwamizawa, Hokkaidō after torrential rains triggered widespread flooding. One person was killed in the city and 29 buildings were destroyed. Agricultural losses in the area amounted to 14.9 million yen (US$110,436). Some of the worst floods were in Obihiro, where nearly 230 million yen (US$1.7 million) in agricultural losses was sustained. A third fatality from Stella took place in the area.

=== Tropical Depression 09W ===
- Tropical depression (JMA)
- Tropical depression (SSHWS)
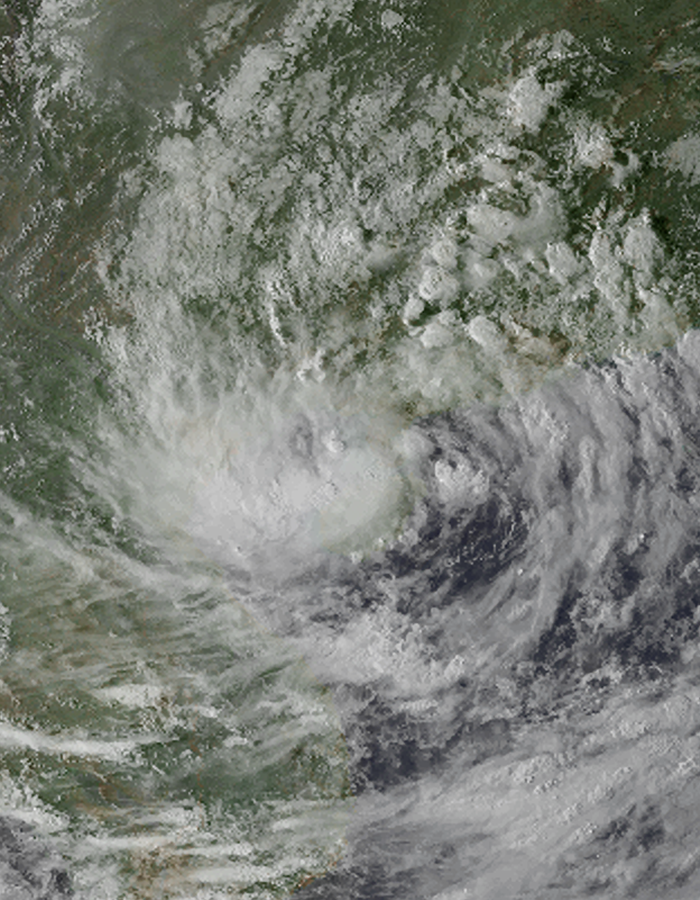
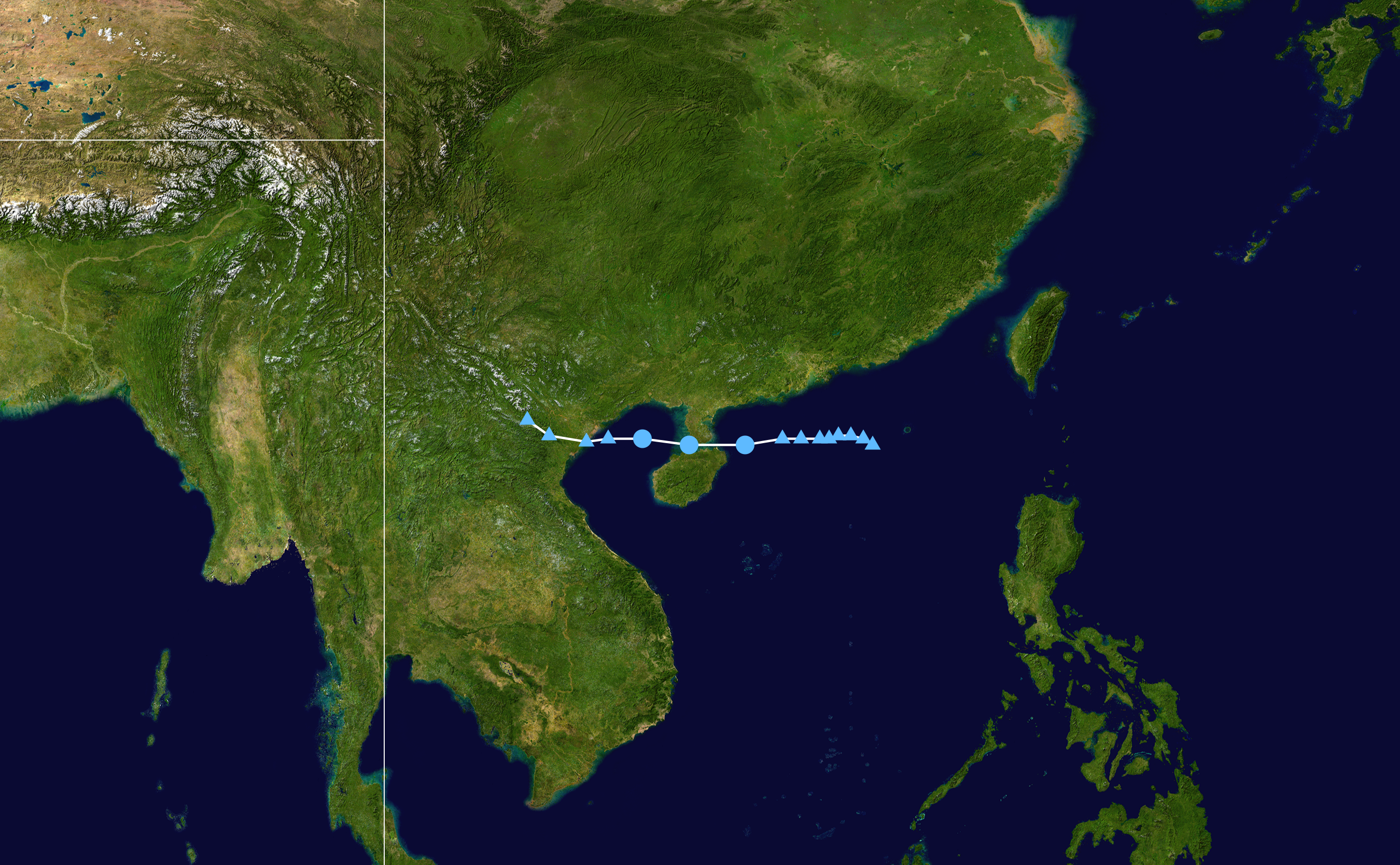
- Duration: September 13 – September 14
- Peak intensity: 55 km/h (35 mph) (10-min); 998 hPa (mbar)

Tropical Depression 09W formed in the South China Sea on September 12, 1998. As the system tracked westward, it intensified and made landfall over Hainan Island, China, and subsequently Vietnam. The storm brought heavy rainfall and strong winds to these regions, causing significant damage and disruption. Although 09W was a relatively short-lived system, its impact on the affected areas was notable, highlighting the potential dangers of even minor tropical cyclones.

=== Typhoon Todd (Emang) ===
- Typhoon (JMA)
- Category 4 super typhoon (SSHWS)
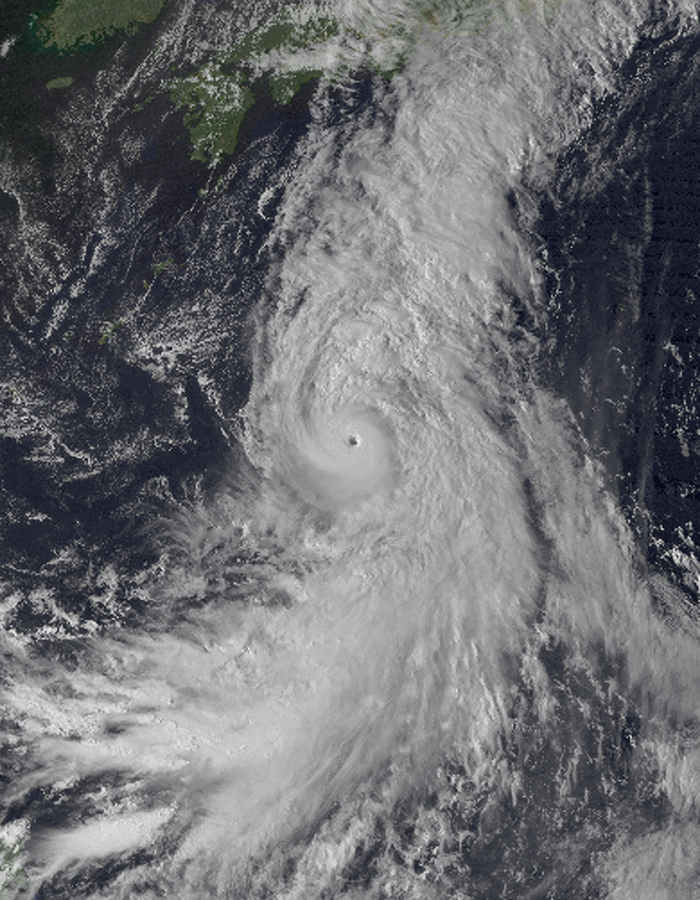
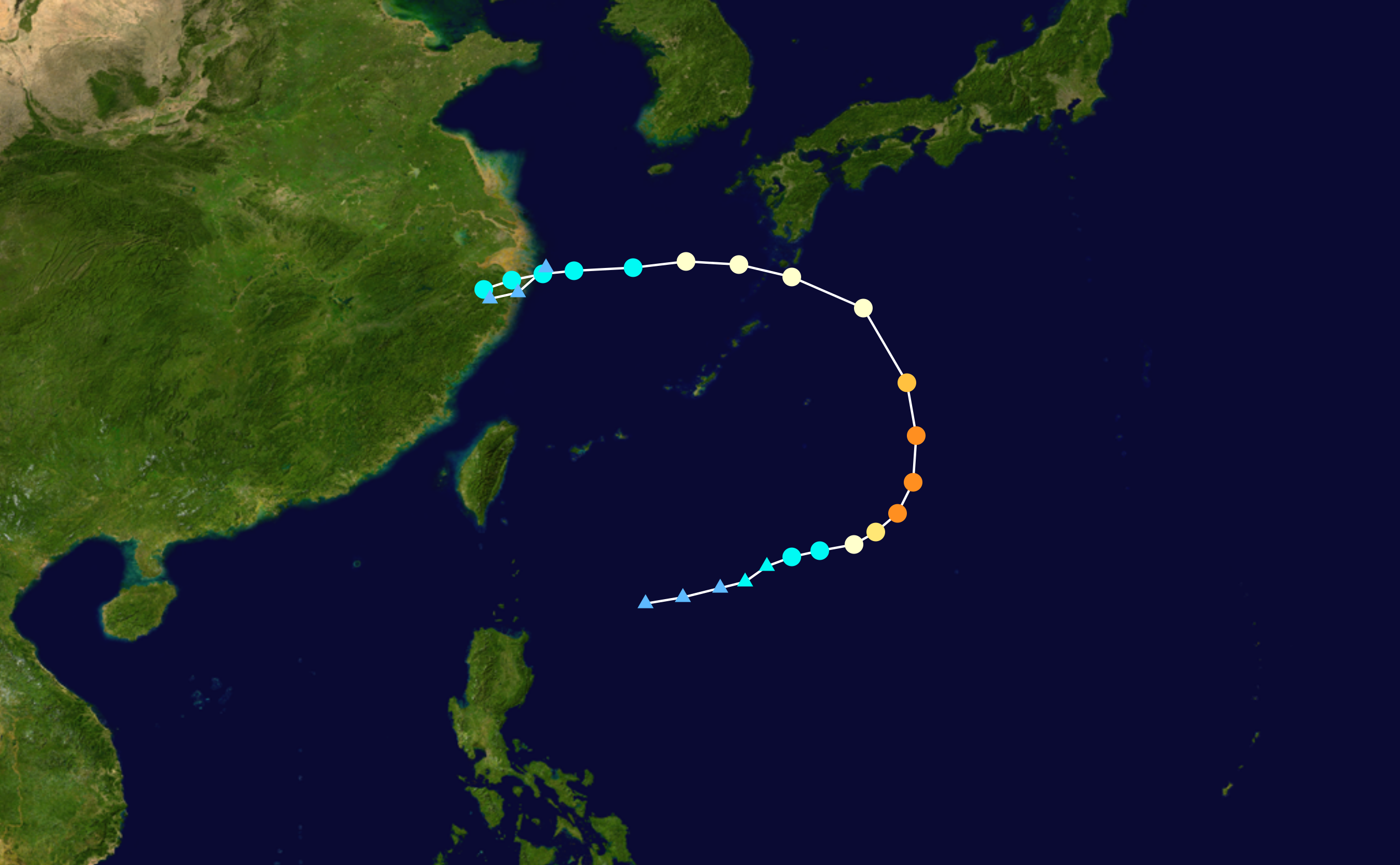
- Duration: September 15 – September 20
- Peak intensity: 140 km/h (85 mph) (10-min); 955 hPa (mbar)

The monsoon trough spawned a low pressure system late on September 14, which developed into Tropical Storm Todd shortly thereafter. Interaction with a trough provided excellent outflow for the system, which explosively intensified over the following day, with 1-minute winds increasing from 50 knots to 130 knots in a 24-hour period ending at 06z on September 17. However, the upper-level low that had been providing Todd with enhanced outflow soon began to shear it as it catapulted the storm northward and then westward, and by the time it had made landfall in China, Todd had weakened back into a tropical storm with 10-minute winds of 45 knots per the JMA. Todd dissipated inland over China on September 20. Seven people were killed by Todd in Kyushu. Damage in southern Japan amounted to 31.9 million yen (US$236,436).

=== Typhoon Vicki (Gading) ===
- Typhoon (JMA)
- Category 2 typhoon (SSHWS)
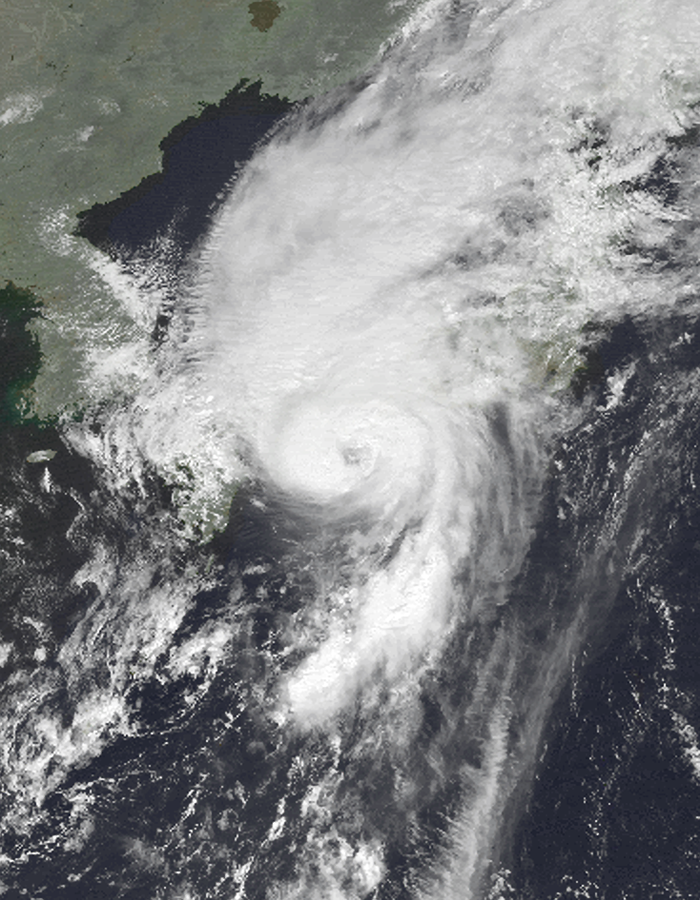
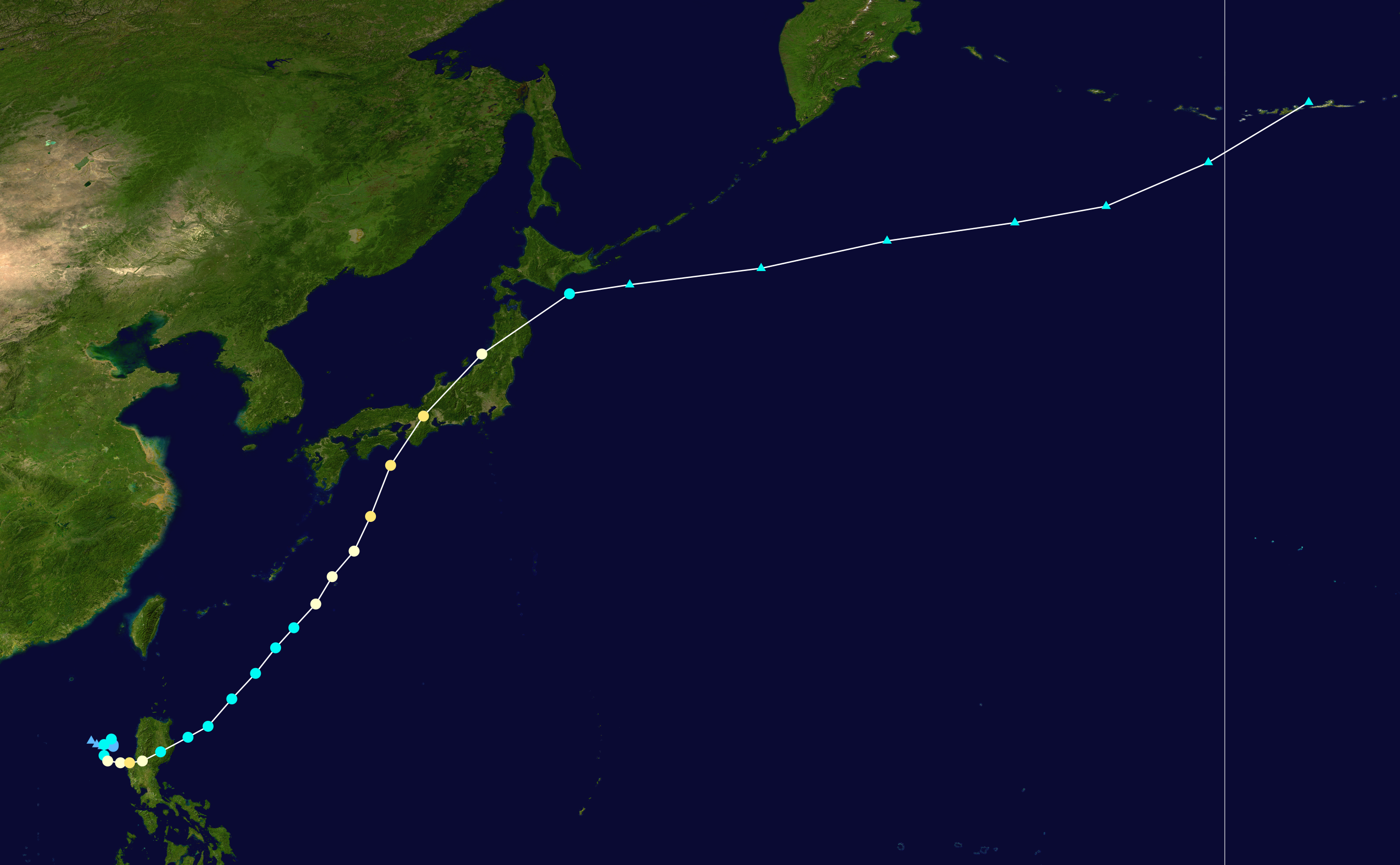
- Duration: September 17 – September 22
- Peak intensity: 140 km/h (85 mph) (10-min); 960 hPa (mbar)

Vicki developed in the South China Sea west of Luzon on September 17. Vicki moved east and crossed Luzon. After landfalling on Luzon, Vicki moved northeast and struck the Kii Peninsula in Japan on September 22 before becoming extratropical. The storm caused the deaths of 108 people. Insurance claims nationwide in Japan reached ¥159.9 billion (US$1.22 billion).

=== Tropical Depression 12W ===
- Tropical depression (SSHWS)
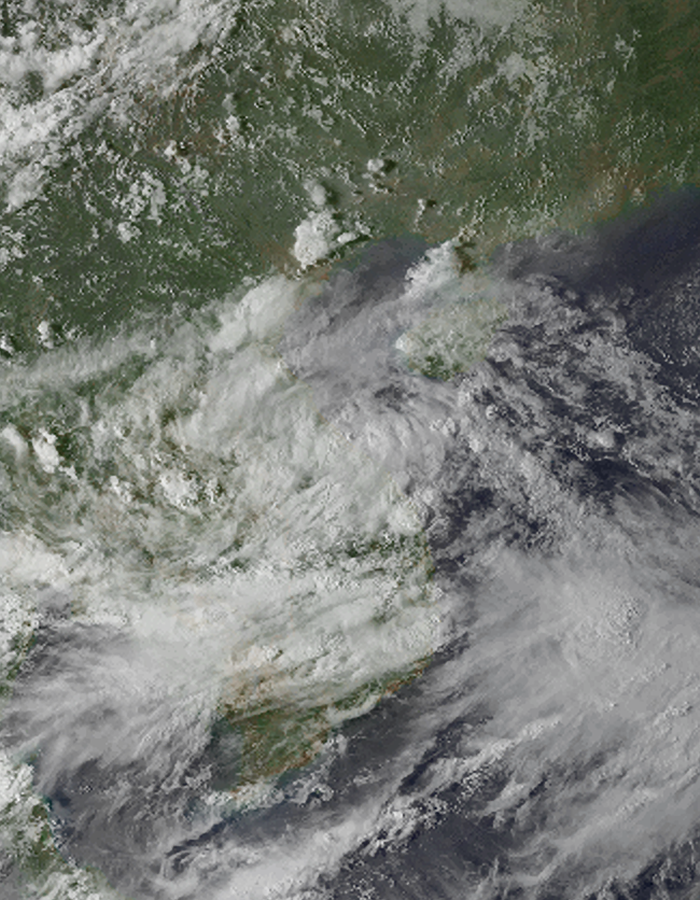
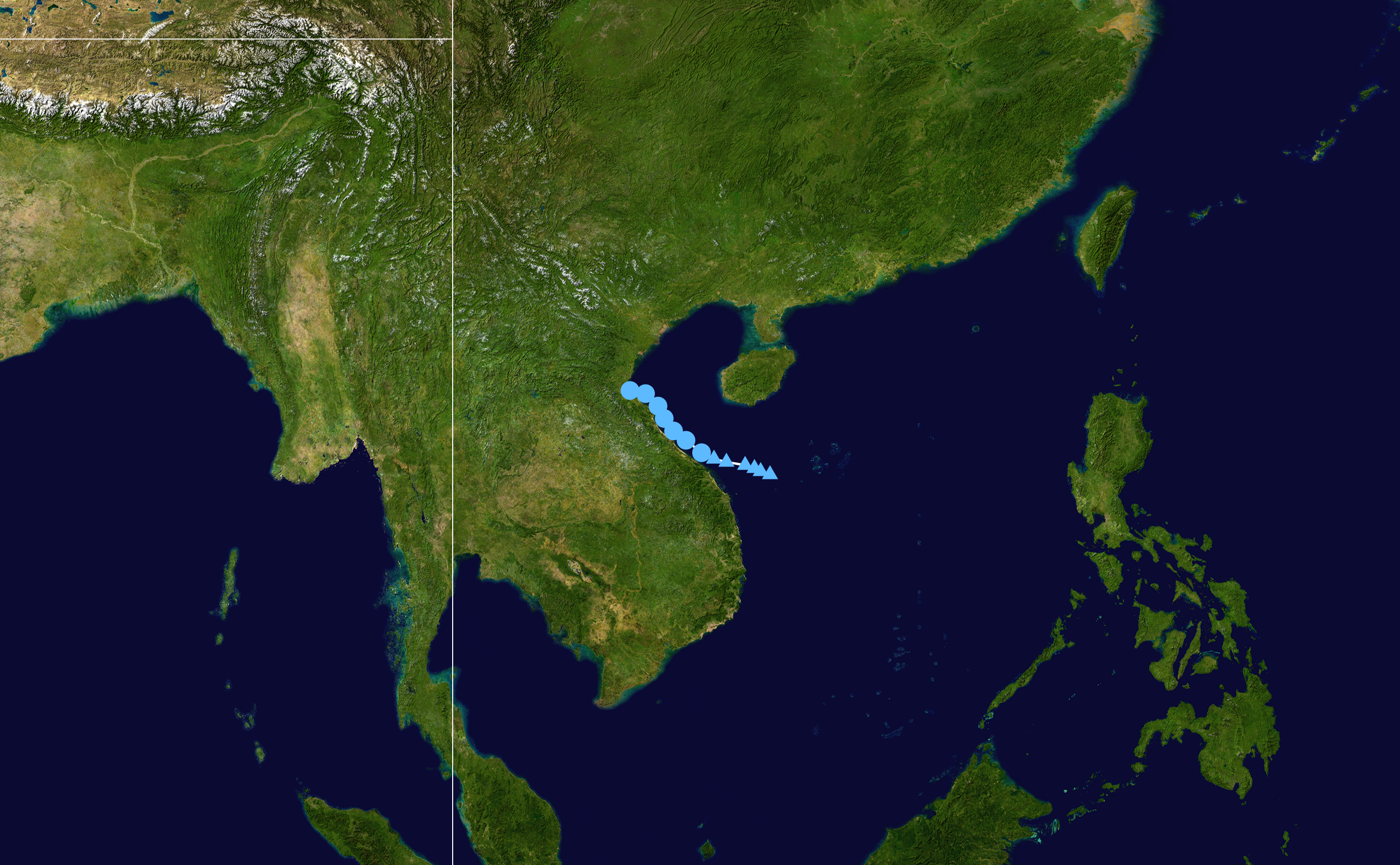
- Duration: September 18 – September 19
- Peak intensity: 55 km/h (35 mph) (1-min); 1000 hPa (mbar)

Tropical Depression 12W formed in the South China Sea on September 16, 1998. It moved west-northwestward and tracked along the coast of Vietnam. Despite its relatively weak intensity, the system brought heavy rainfall and gusty winds to coastal areas, potentially causing localized flooding and disruptions. While 12W did not develop into a stronger storm, its impact on the region underscores the importance of monitoring even minor tropical disturbances, as they can still lead to significant weather events.

=== Tropical Storm Waldo ===
- Tropical storm (JMA)
- Tropical storm (SSHWS)
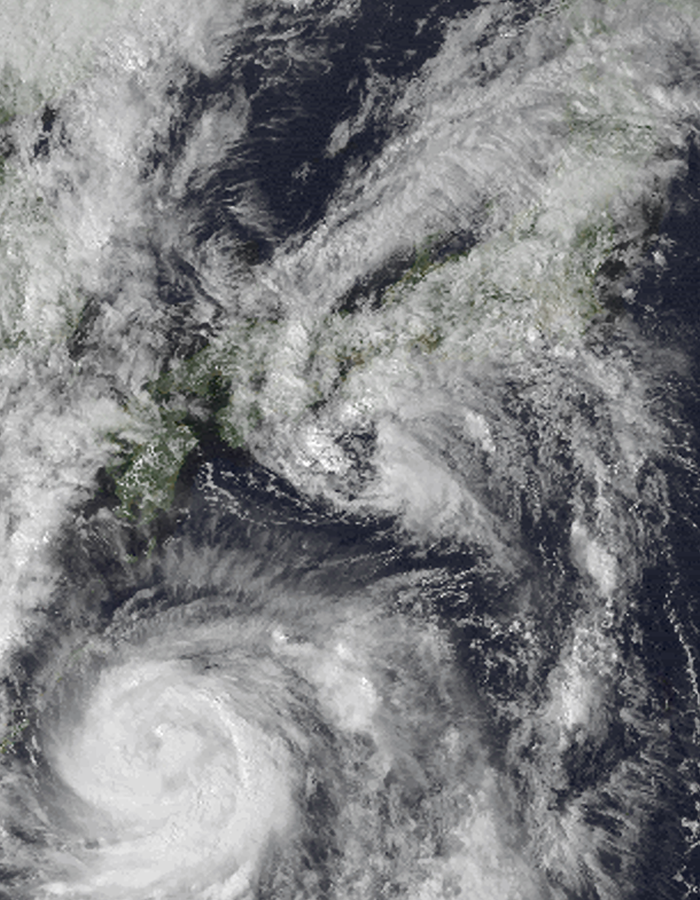
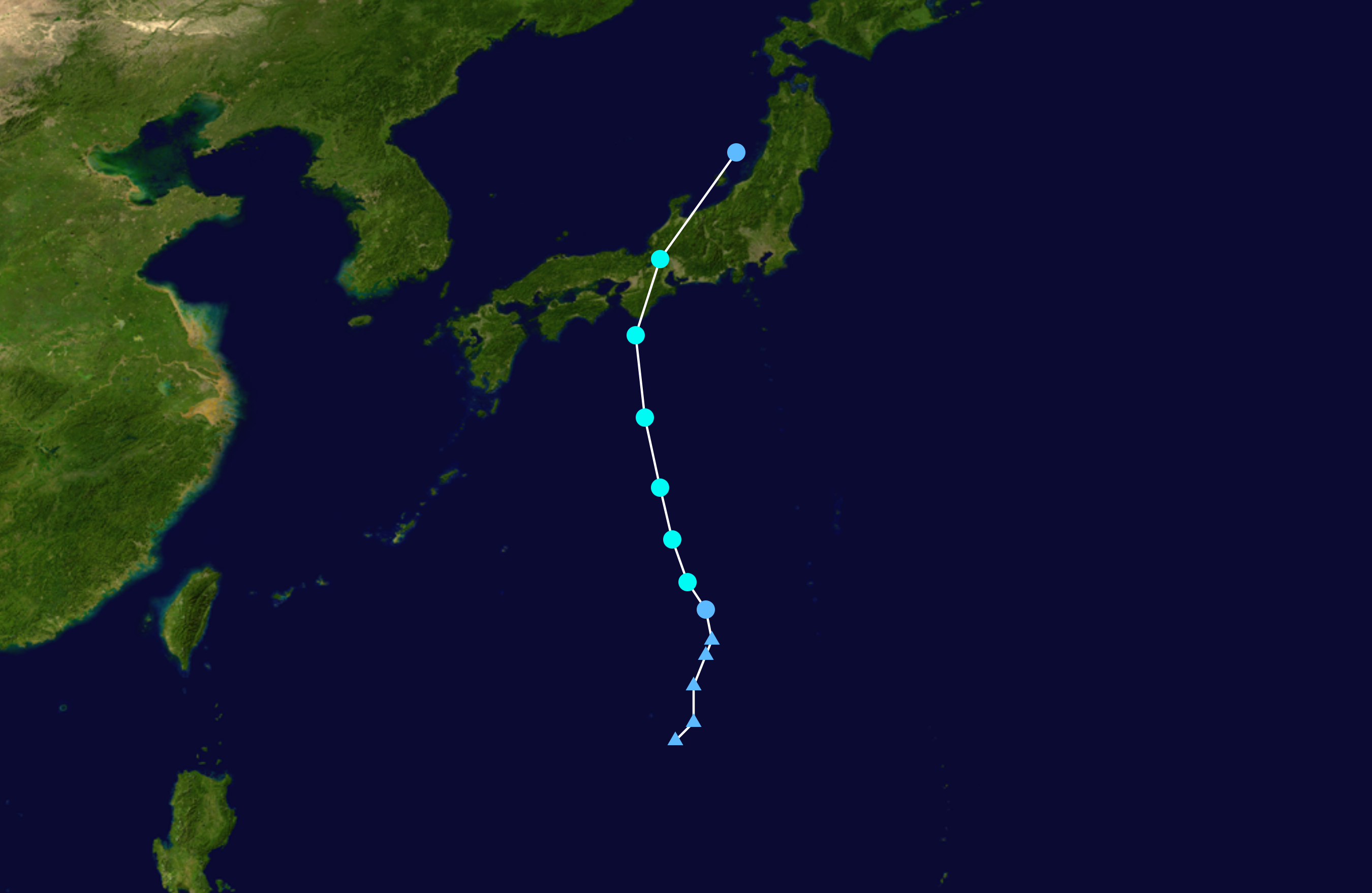
- Duration: September 19 – September 21
- Peak intensity: 85 km/h (50 mph) (10-min); 994 hPa (mbar)

Tropical Storm Waldo was a tropical cyclone that formed in the western North Pacific Ocean during the 1998 typhoon season. While it didn't reach typhoon strength, it still brought significant impacts to the areas it affected. Waldo formed on September 19, 1998, and moved westward across the Philippines. It brought heavy rainfall and strong winds to the country, leading to flooding, landslides, and other weather-related hazards. The storm caused damage to infrastructure and displaced thousands of people. Significant flooding caused widespread damage across the nation. Agricultural losses were at ¥10.3 billion (US$78.6 million).

=== Typhoon Yanni (Heling) ===
- Typhoon (JMA)
- Category 1 typhoon (SSHWS)
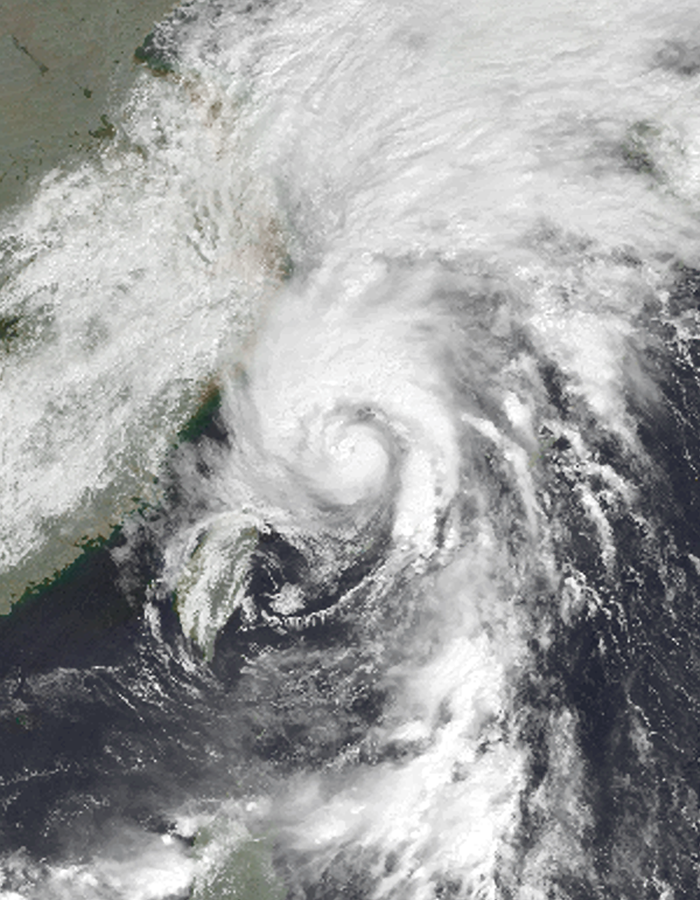
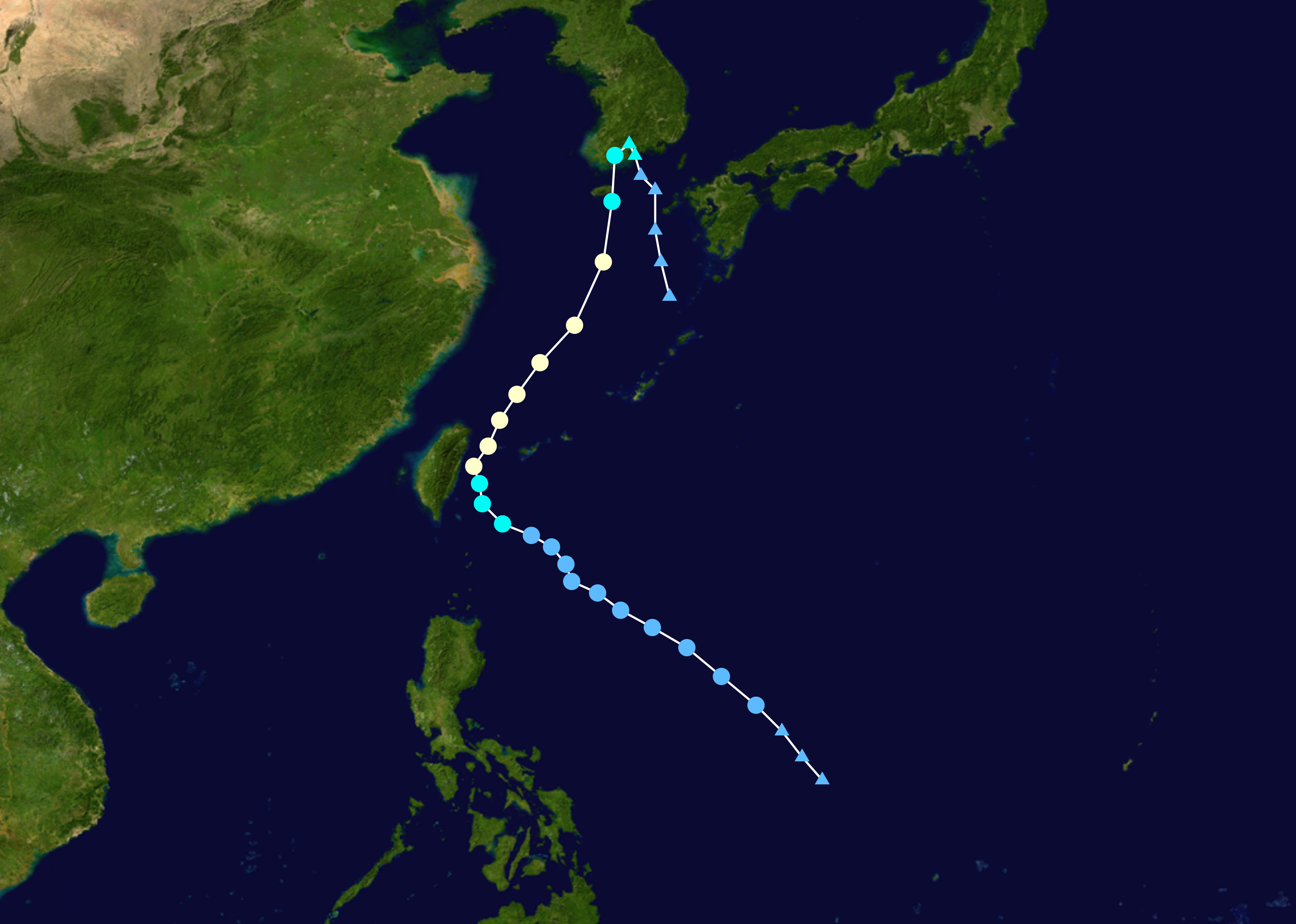
- Duration: September 26 – September 30
- Peak intensity: 120 km/h (75 mph) (10-min); 965 hPa (mbar)

Typhoon Yanni (Heling) was a powerful tropical cyclone that struck East Asia in late September 1998. It caused widespread devastation, particularly in South Korea, leading to significant flooding, landslides, and property damage. The storm resulted in over 50 fatalities and caused ¥6 billion (US$45.8 million) in damage.

=== Tropical Depression 15W ===
- Tropical depression (JMA)
- Tropical depression (SSHWS)
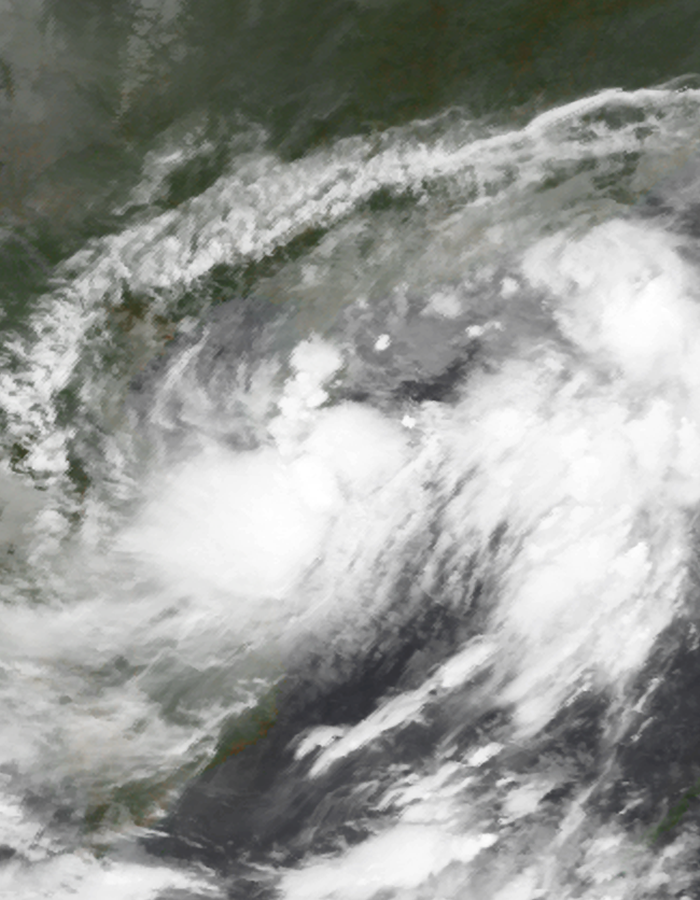
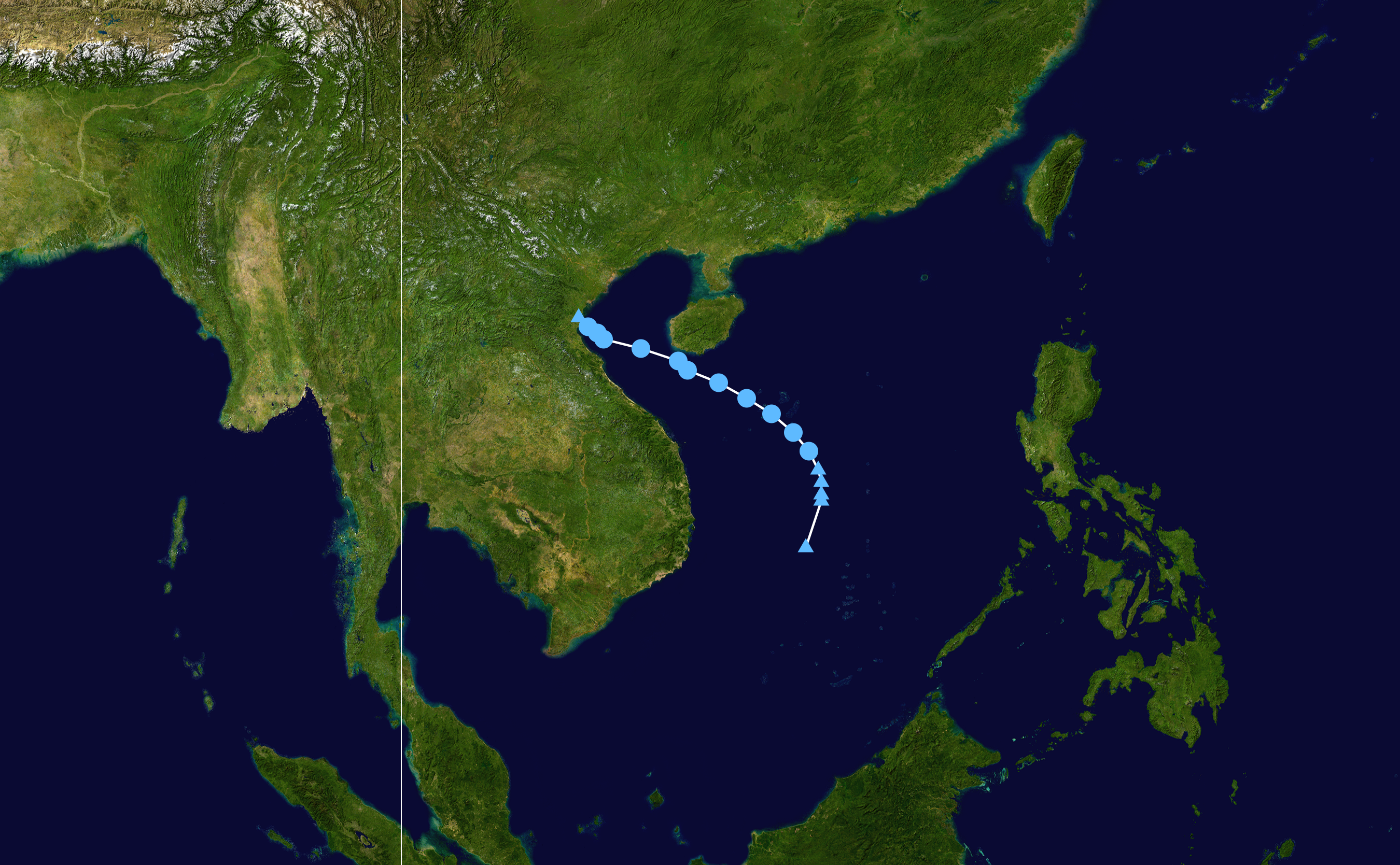
- Duration: October 2 – October 5
- Peak intensity: 55 km/h (35 mph) (10-min); 1000 hPa (mbar)

Tropical Depression 15W formed in the South China Sea on October 2, 1998. Initially tracking northeastward, it later shifted its course to the northwest. The depression made landfall in Vietnam shortly before dissipating on October 5. While not a major storm, it still brought significant rainfall and potential flooding to the affected areas.

=== Tropical Depression 16W ===
- Tropical depression (JMA)
- Tropical depression (SSHWS)
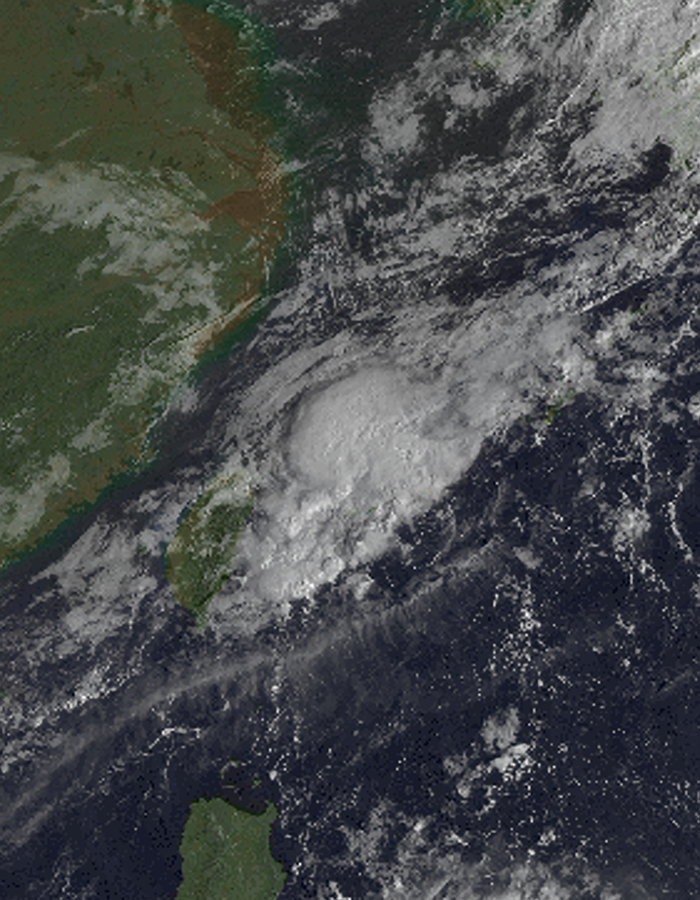
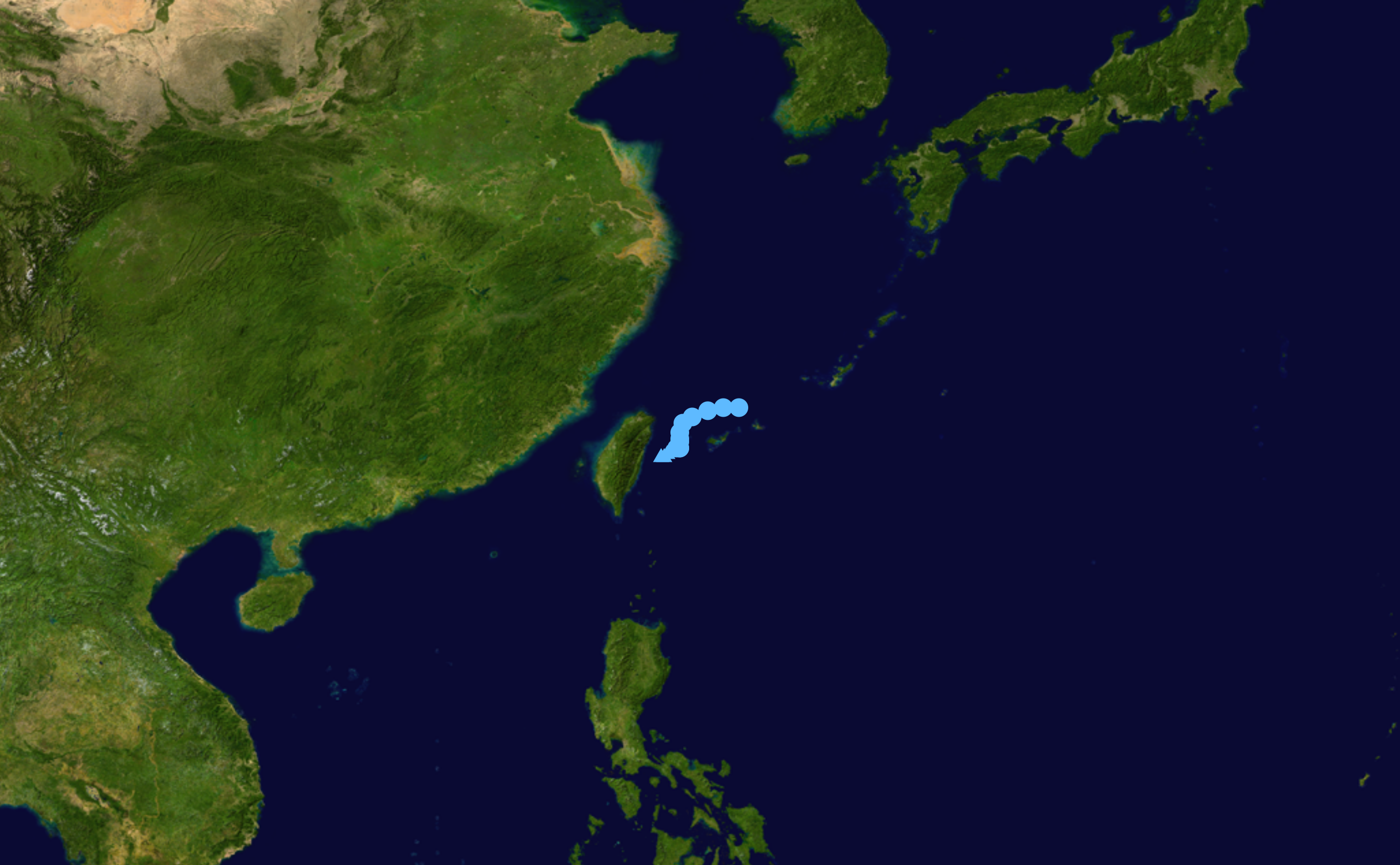
- Duration: October 4 – October 7
- Peak intensity: 55 km/h (35 mph) (10-min); 1010 hPa (mbar)

Tropical Depression 16W formed east of Taiwan in early October 1998. Initially, it remained stationary due to weak steering currents. As it slowly moved northeastward, it reached a peak intensity of 30 knots (55 km/h). However, increasing vertical wind shear weakened the system, leading to its dissipation south of Okinawa. While 16W was a relatively short-lived and weak tropical cyclone, it still contributed to the overall activity of the 1998 Pacific typhoon season.

=== Tropical Depression 17W ===
- Tropical depression (JMA)
- Tropical depression (SSHWS)
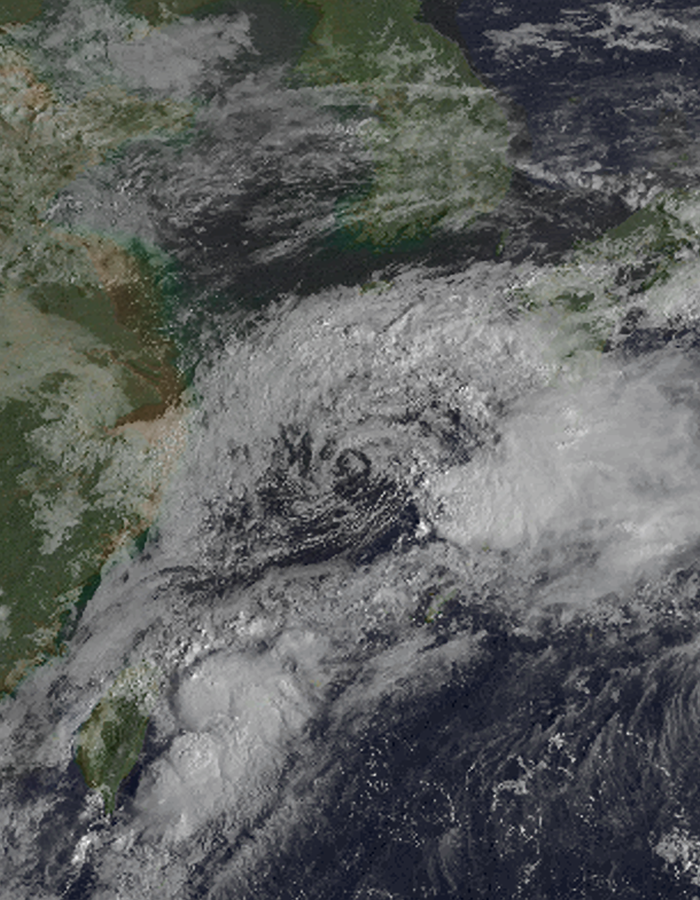
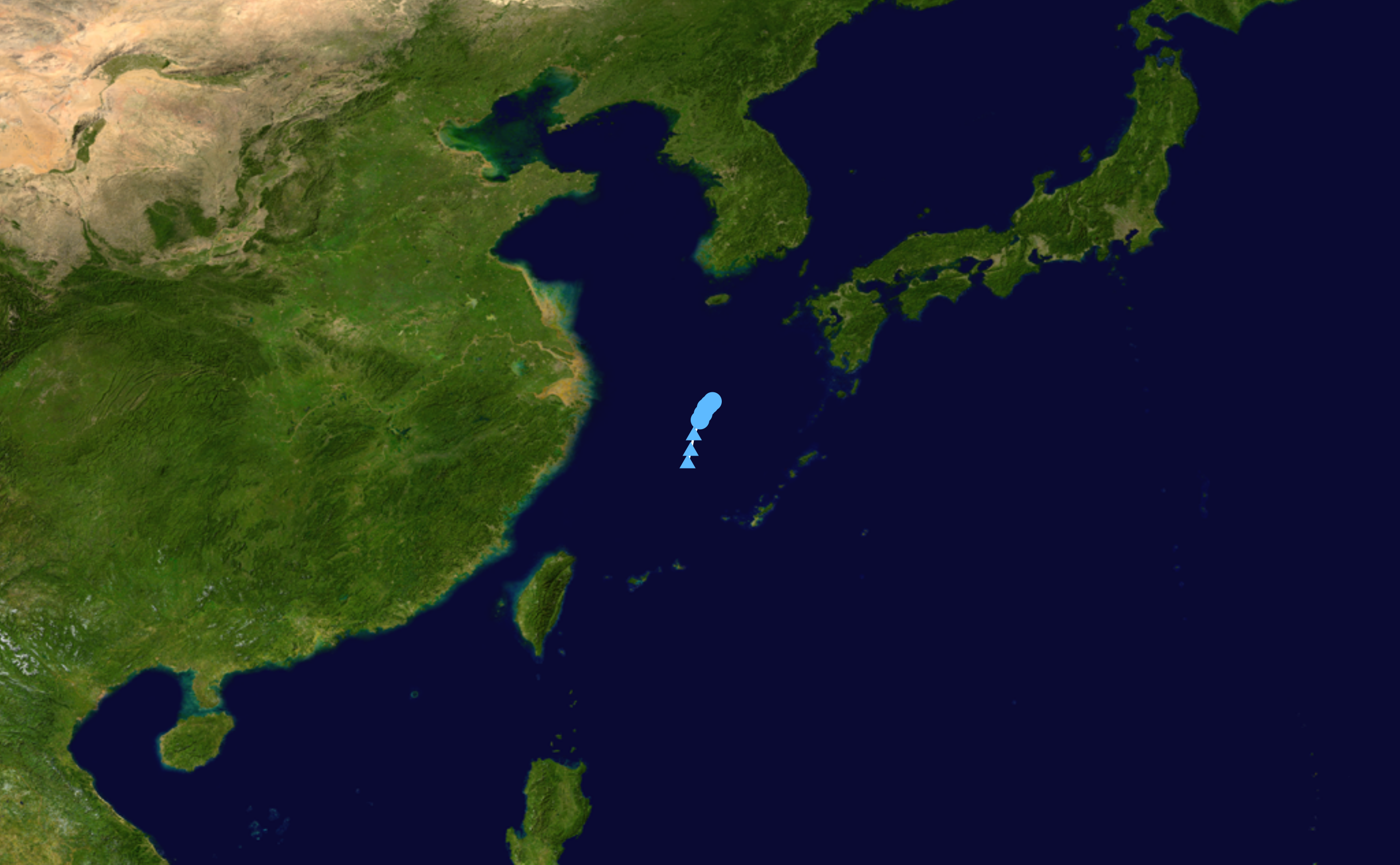
- Duration: October 5 – October 6
- Peak intensity: 55 km/h (35 mph) (10-min); 1008 hPa (mbar)

Tropical Depression 17W formed in the Western Pacific Ocean during the 1969 Pacific typhoon season. It was a weak tropical cyclone that did not significantly impact any land areas. The depression formed in a region with unfavorable environmental conditions, such as strong vertical wind shear, which limited its development and intensity. As a result, it dissipated shortly after its formation, leaving minimal impact on the region.

=== Typhoon Zeb (Iliang) ===
- Violent typhoon (JMA)
- Category 5 super typhoon (SSHWS)
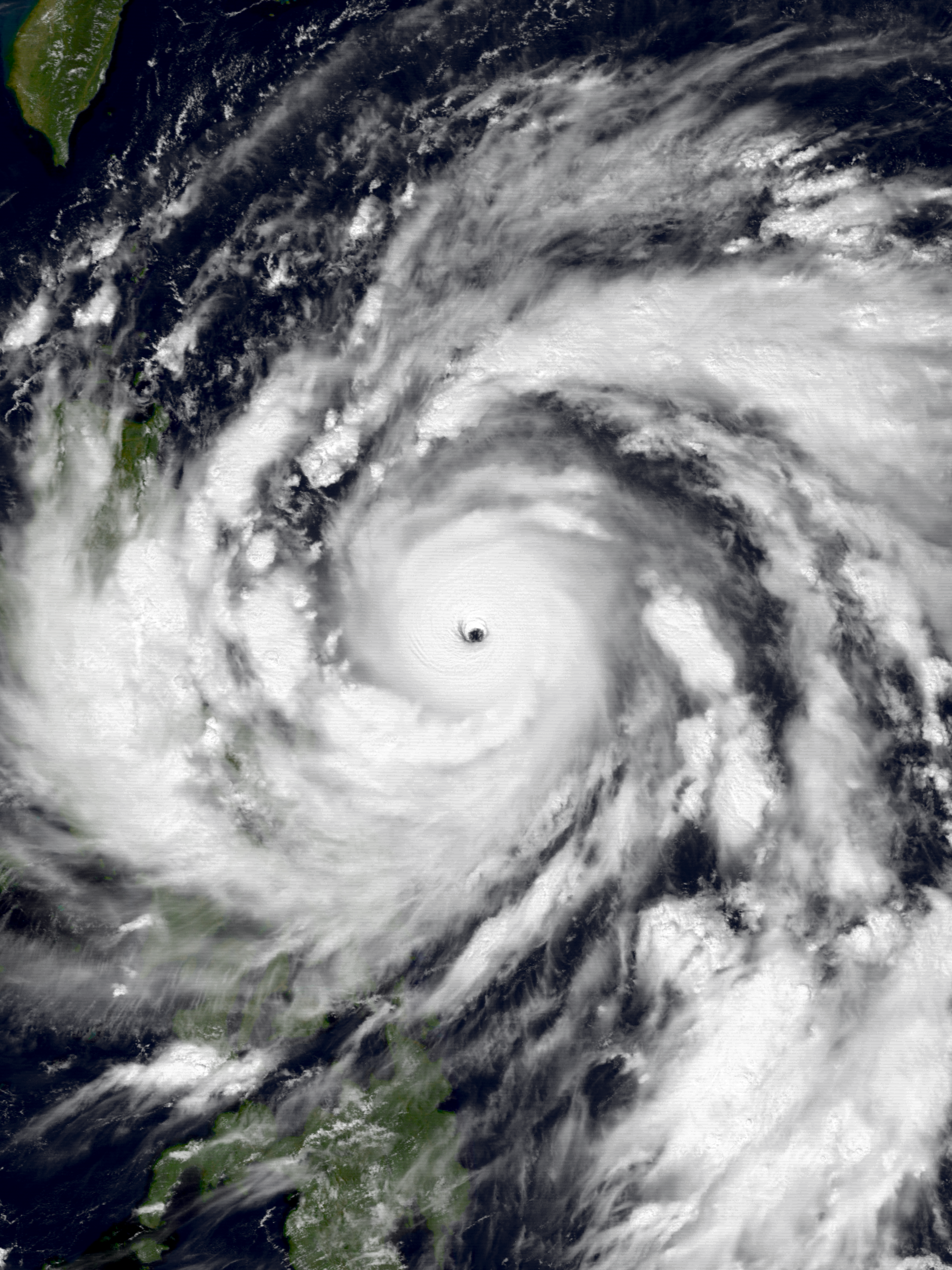
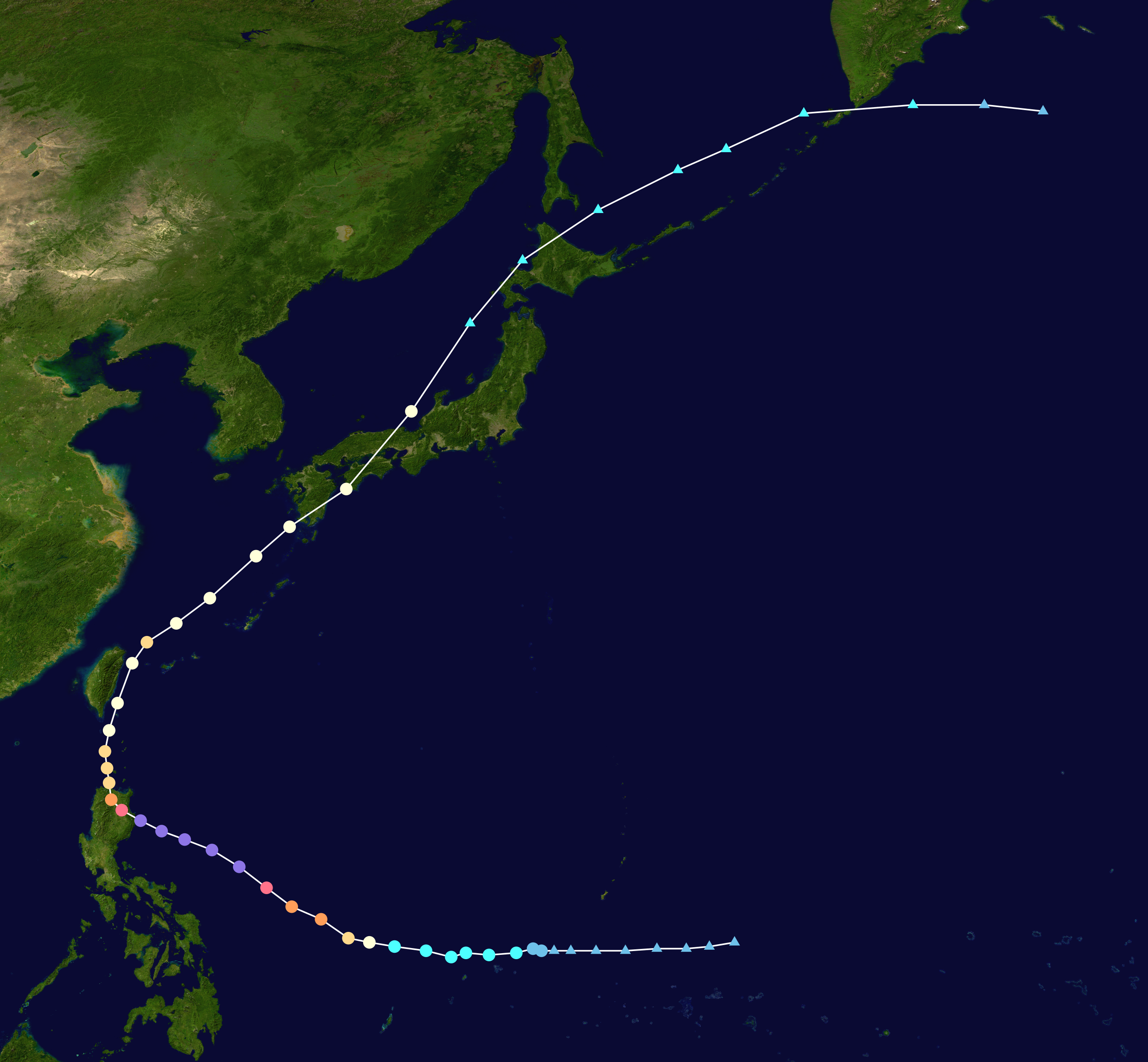
- Duration: October 10 – October 17
- Peak intensity: 205 km/h (125 mph) (10-min); 900 hPa (mbar)

The monsoon trough near Guam developed a tropical depression on October 7. It moved westward, strengthening to a tropical storm on the 10th. The large inflow of the storm developed another tropical storm on the 10th; Tropical Storm Alex. The two moved westward, and as Zeb strengthened to a typhoon on the 11th, it absorbed the short-lived Tropical Storm Alex. It continued west-northwestward, rapidly intensifying to a 180 mph (290 km/h) super typhoon on the 13th with an official minimum central pressure of 900 millibars and an unofficial minimum central pressure of 872 millibars, which would tie for the second lowest on record. Zeb maintained this intensity until hitting Luzon in the Philippines on the 14th. After weakening over the archipelago Zeb moved northward to hit Taiwan as a minimal typhoon on the 15th. It maintained this intensity until hitting Japan on the 17th, after which it became extratropical on the 18th. Zeb was responsible for 122 casualties in its path.

=== Tropical Storm Alex ===
- Tropical depression (JMA)
- Tropical storm (SSHWS)
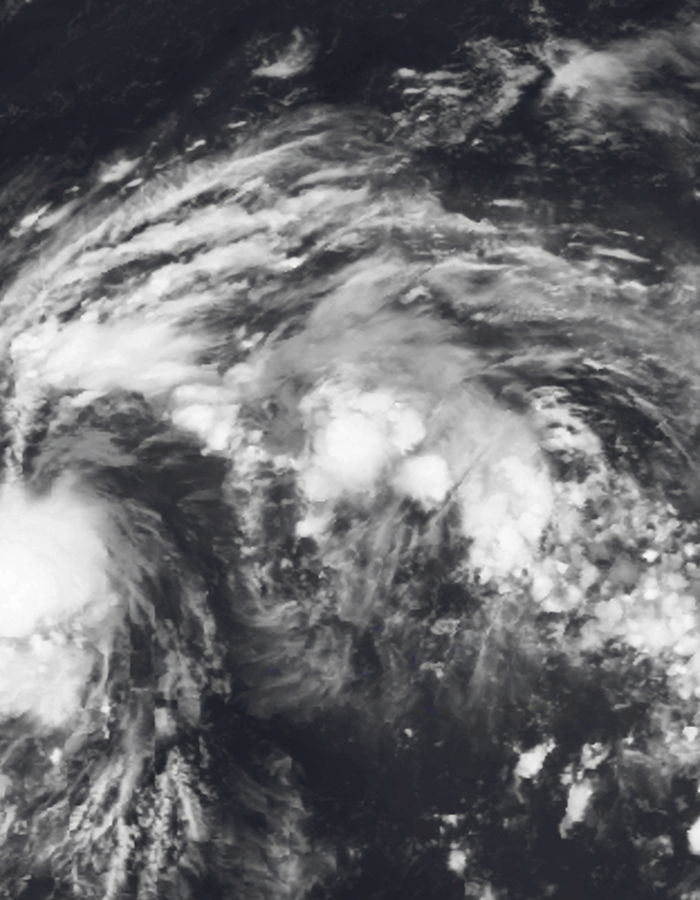
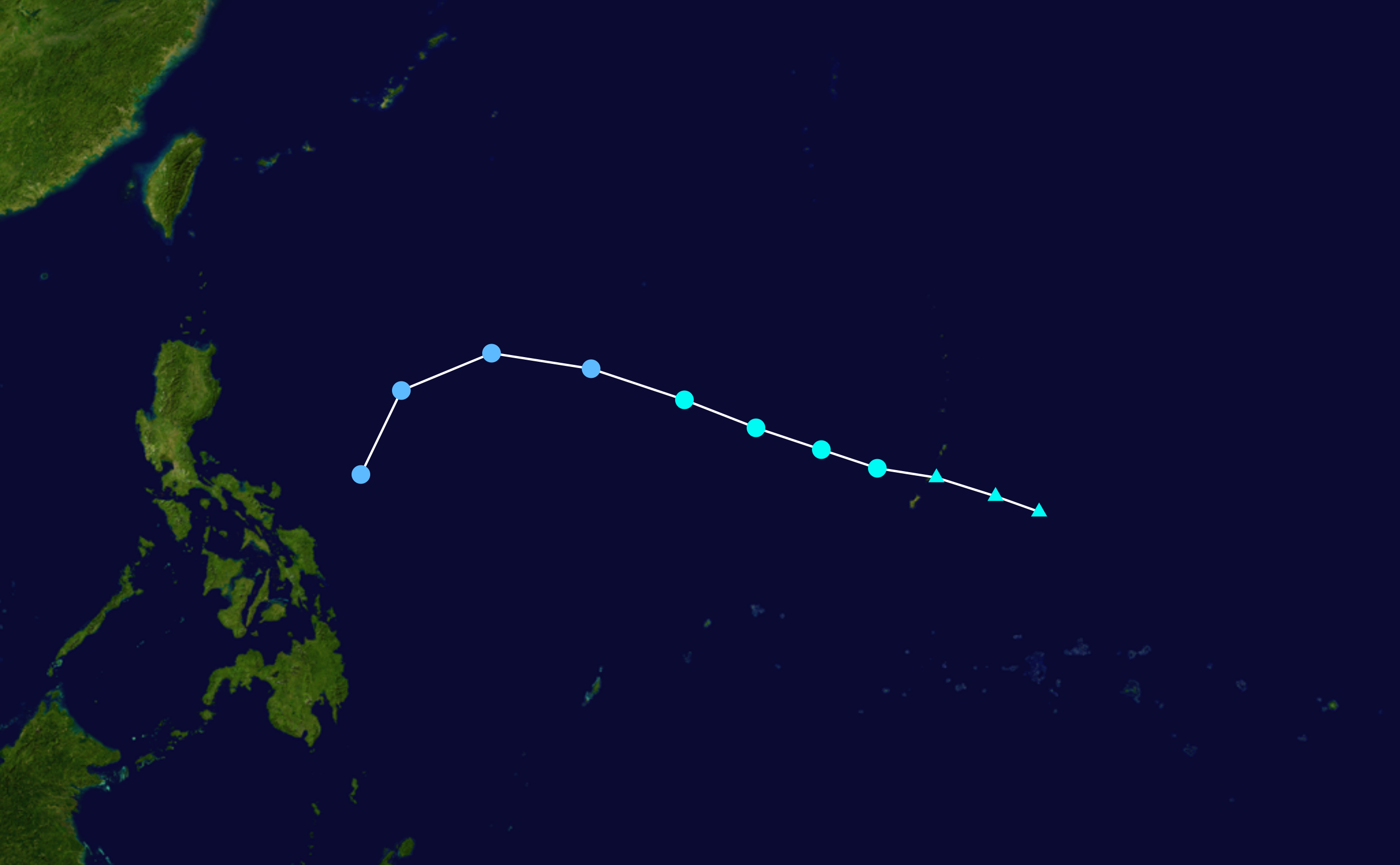
- Duration: October 11 – October 12
- Peak intensity: 45 km/h (30 mph) (10-min); 991 hPa (mbar)

On October 10, a small area of low pressure developed within the outflow of Typhoon Zeb. The low maintained an area of deep convection and quickly strengthened into a tropical storm. Operationally, the system was not classified as a tropical storm until 0600 UTC on October 11. Zeb then brought stronger wind shear over Alex, ultimately absorbing the short lived Alex. Alex reached the intensity of tropical storm with sustained winds of 45 knots over 1 minute according to the Joint Typhoon Warning Center

=== Typhoon Babs (Loleng) ===
- Very strong typhoon (JMA)
- Category 4 super typhoon (SSHWS)
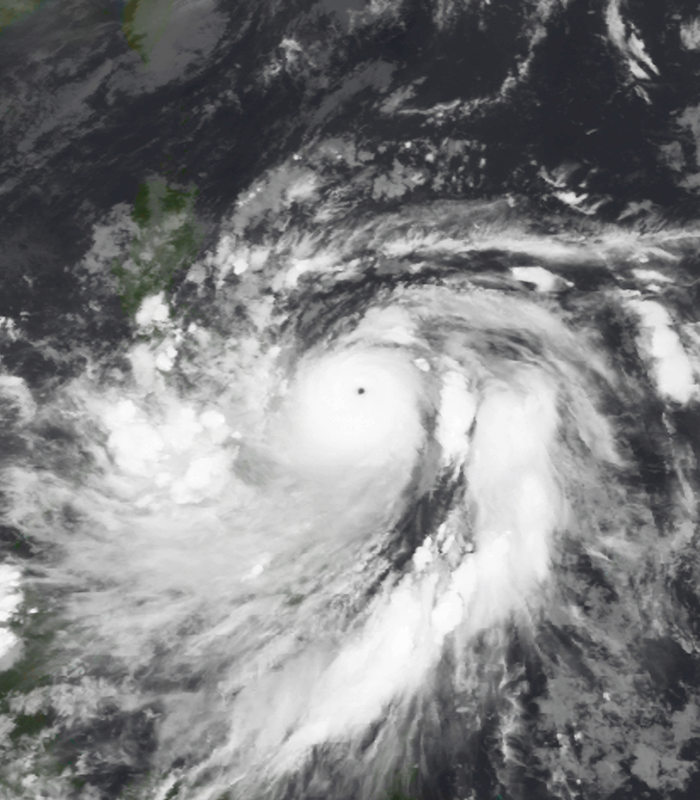
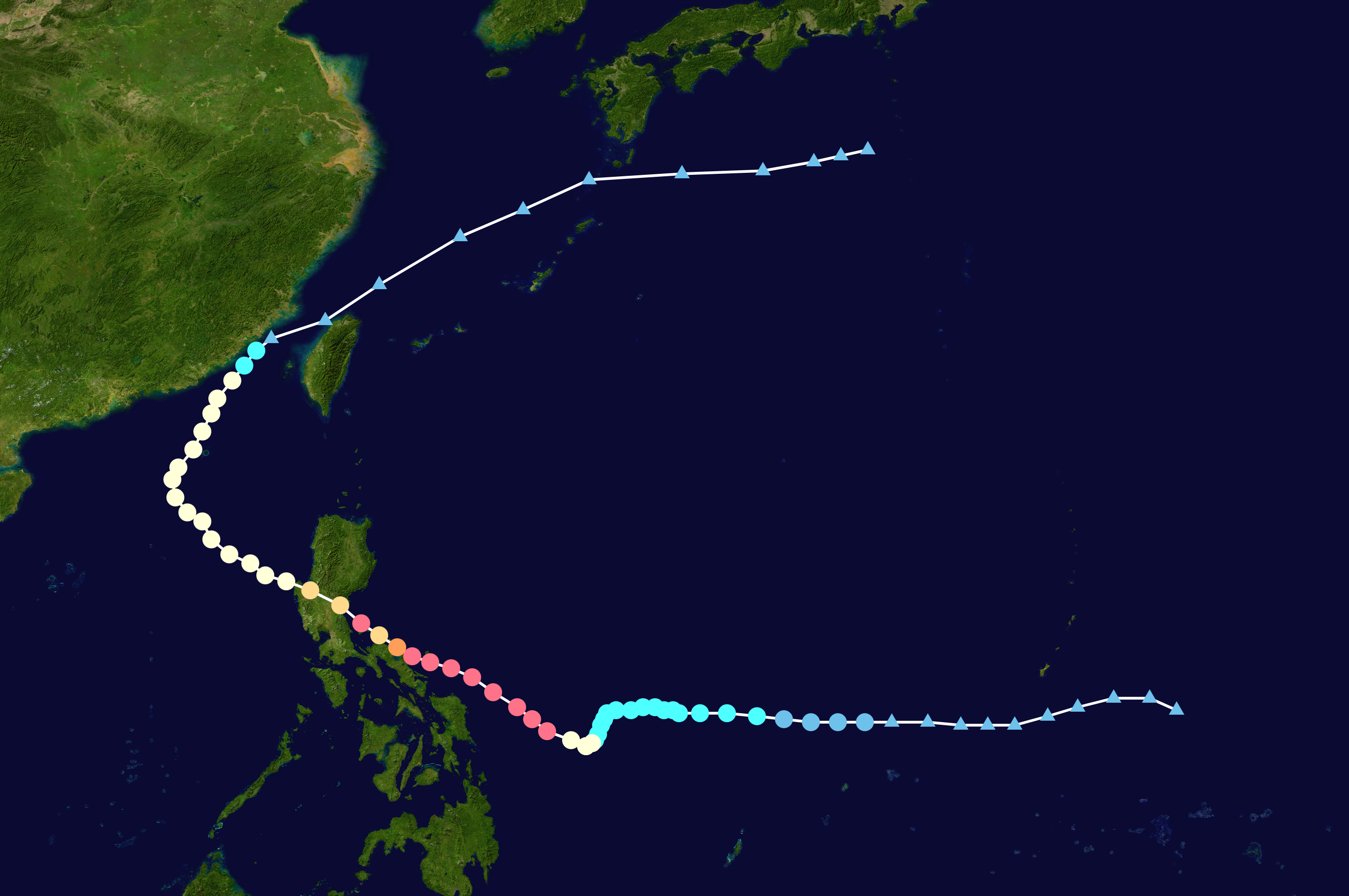
- Duration: October 14 – October 27
- Peak intensity: 155 km/h (100 mph) (10-min); 940 hPa (mbar)

A tropical disturbance in association with the TUTT (Tropical Upper Tropospheric Trough) formed into a tropical depression on October 11 near Guam. It moved westward under the influence of the Subtropical Ridge, and became a tropical storm on the 15th. Babs slowly intensified due to little upper level outflow, but when the outflow became more pronounced, it strengthened to a typhoon on the 19th and a super typhoon with a peak of 155 mph (249 km/h) winds on the 20th. Babs hit the central Philippines as a Category 4, and flooded an area just hit by another super typhoon, Zeb, only 7 days before. Babs weakened over the islands, and turned north where upper level shear caused it to dissipate on the 27th. Super Typhoon Babs caused heavy mudslides in the Philippines, resulting in more than 300 deaths and heavy flooding.

=== Tropical Storm Chip ===
- Tropical storm (JMA)
- Tropical storm (SSHWS)
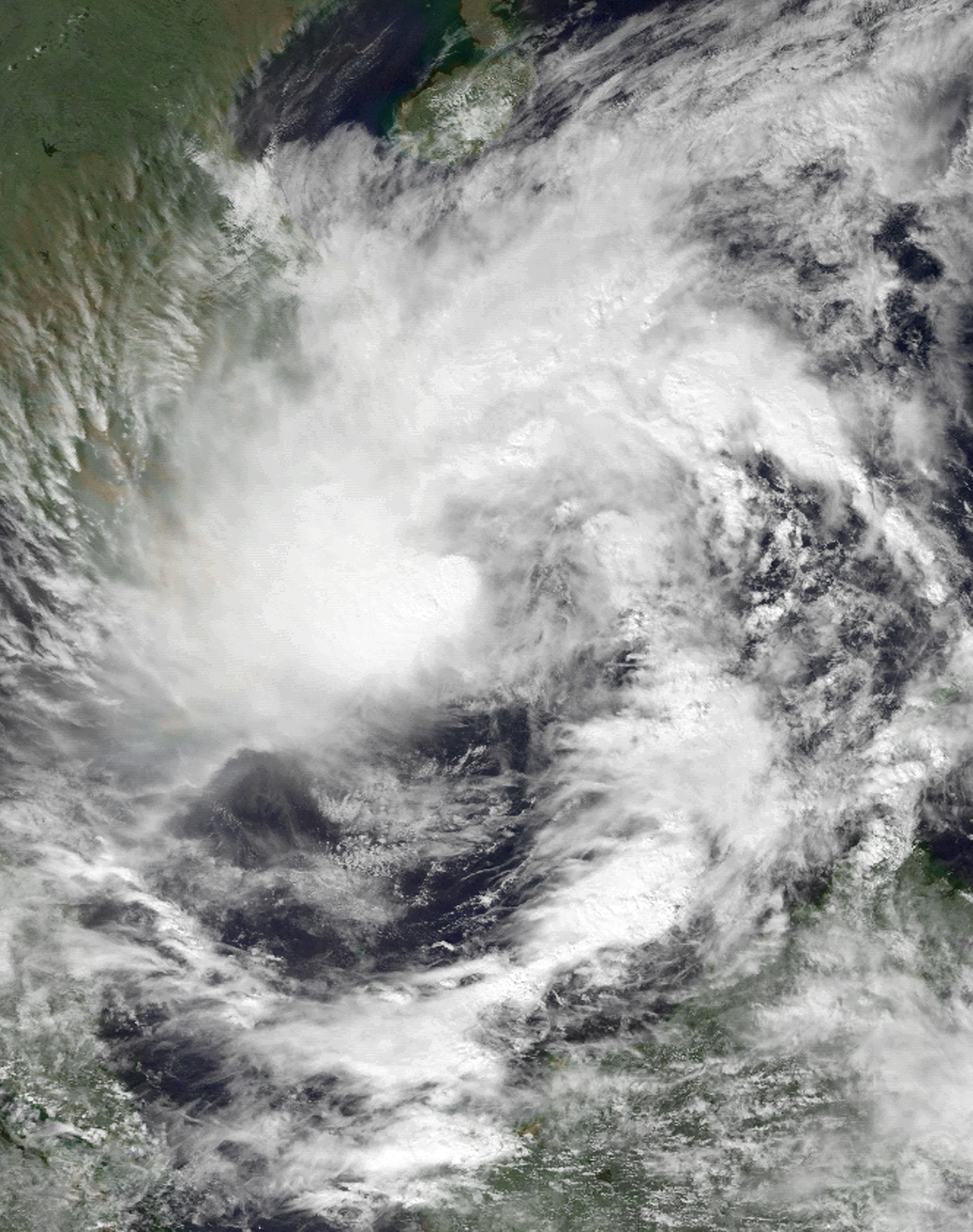
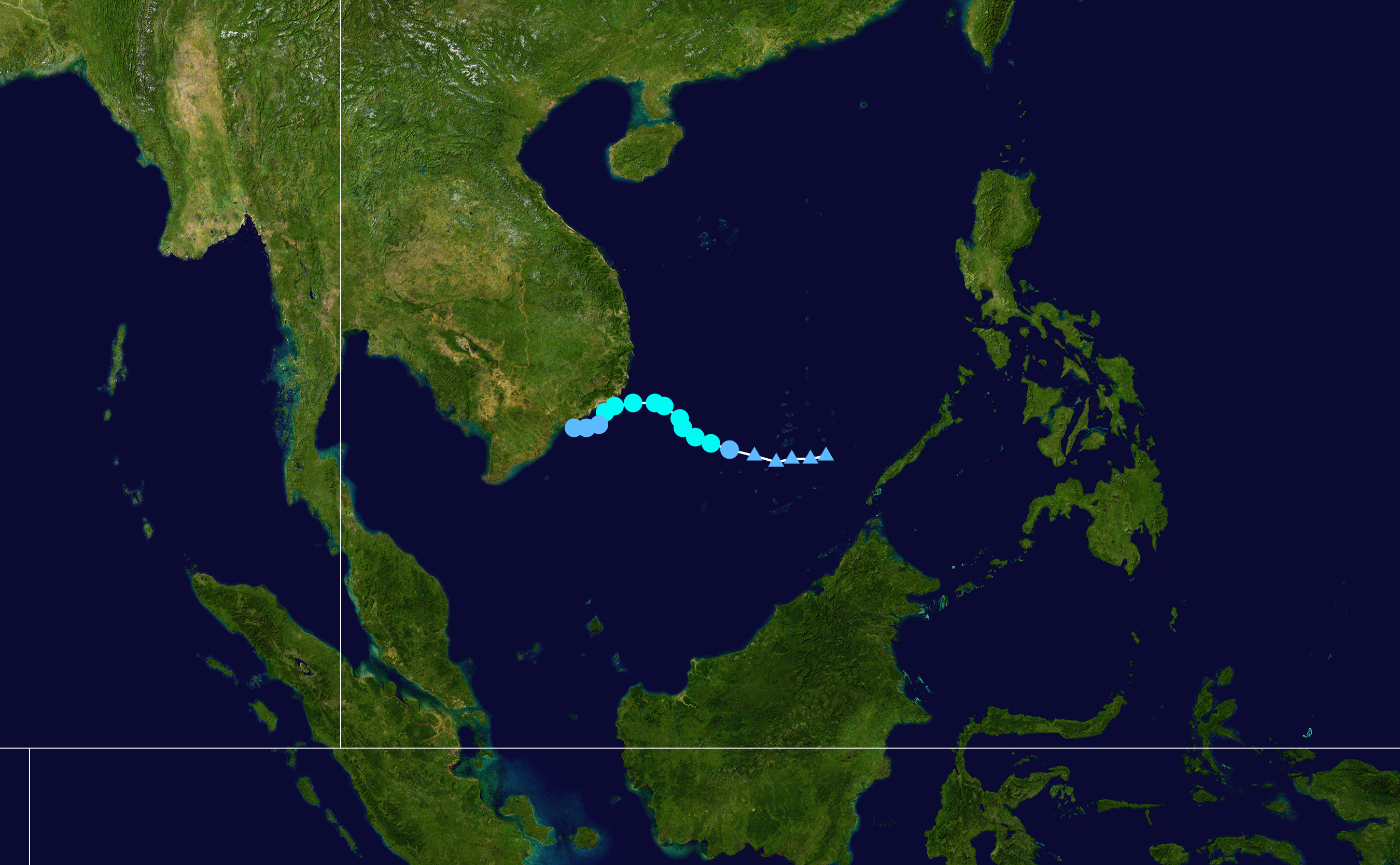
- Duration: November 11 – November 17
- Peak intensity: 75 km/h (45 mph) (10-min); 994 hPa (mbar)

A monsoonal low that persisted over the South China Sea began to coalesce on November 10, and on the following day, the system became organized enough to be classified as a depression, receiving the designation 21W by the Joint Typhoon Warning Center. Although the depression initially struggled due to vertical wind shear displacing convection to the west of the center, gradual improvement in structure led to the system being upgraded into a tropical storm early on November 12 and receiving the name Chip. Gradually organizing as it moved northwest slowly, Chip reached peak 1-minute winds of 50 knots and 10-minute sustained winds of 40 knots per the JTWC and JMA respectively shortly before its landfall in Vietnam early on November 14.

Chip killed at least 17 people and caused VND 16.2 billion ($923,400 1998 USD) in Vietnam. The remnants of Chip regenerated into a tropical cyclone over the Bay of Bengal. Peaking as a strong Category 1 cyclone, it then was known as Cyclone 07B when its remnants cross Vietnam, Thailand, and Cambodia. The system made landfall in Bangladesh, killing 100 people.

=== Tropical Storm Dawn ===
- Tropical storm (JMA)
- Tropical storm (SSHWS)
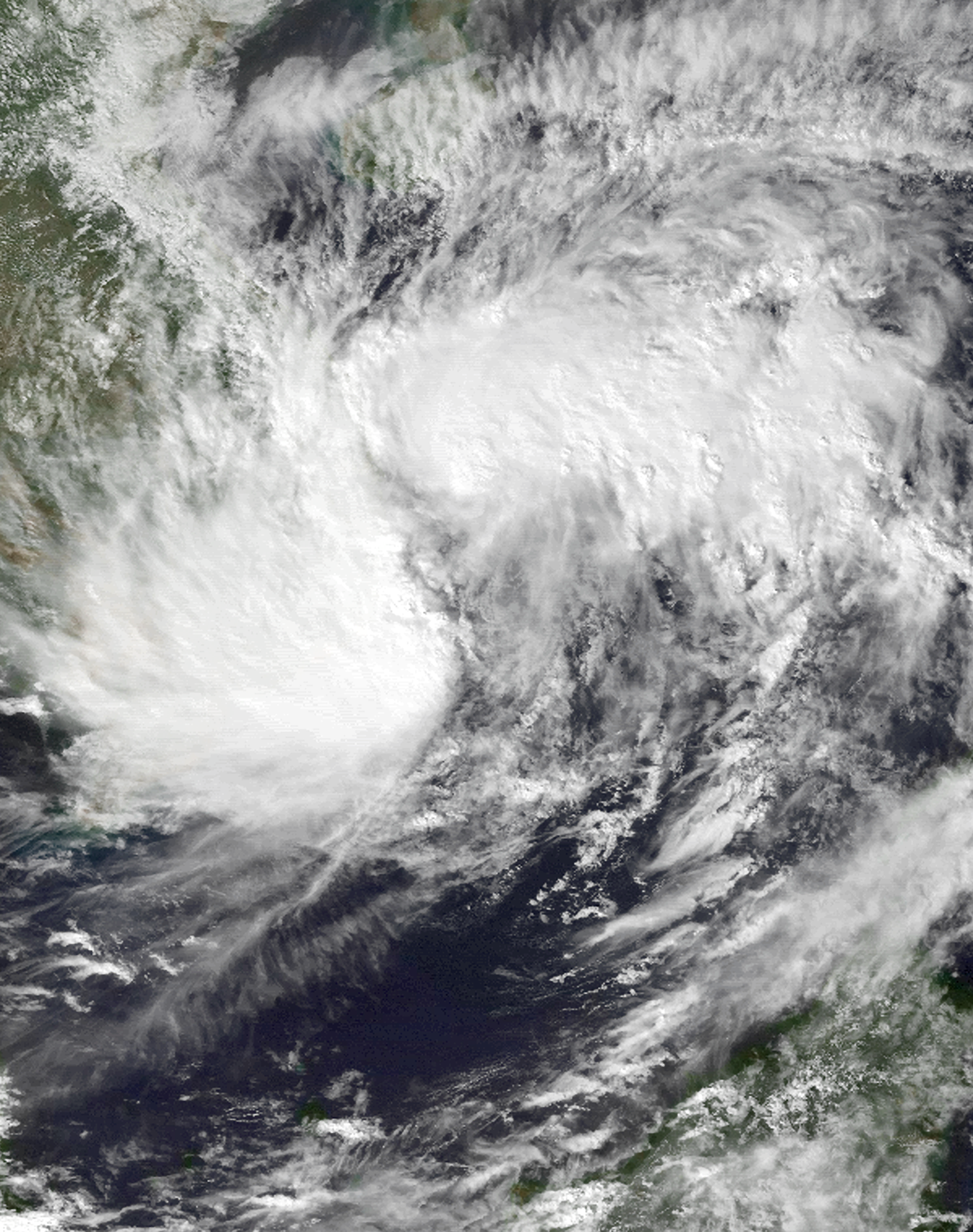
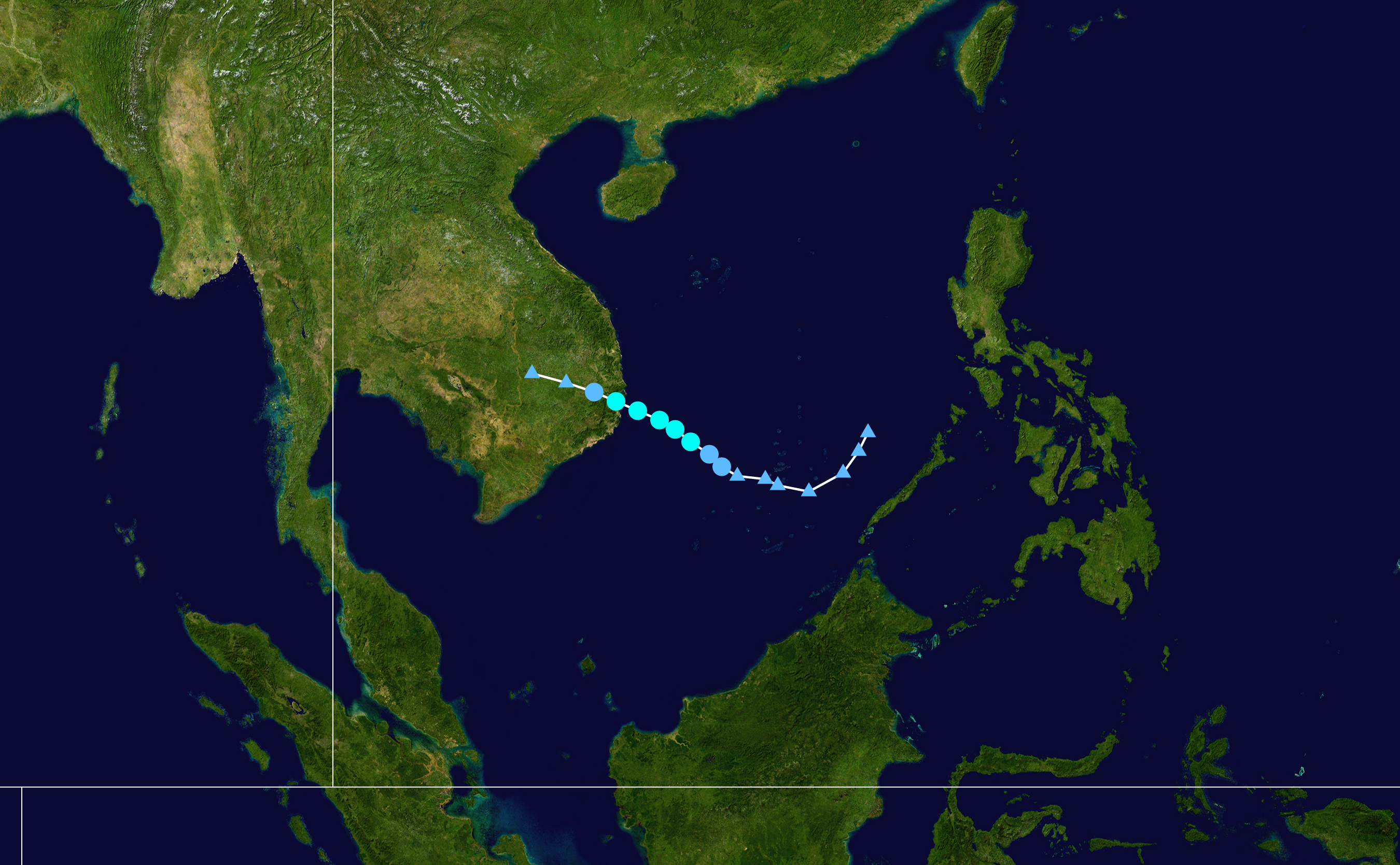
- Duration: November 16 – November 20
- Peak intensity: 65 km/h (40 mph) (10-min); 998 hPa (mbar)

Though a weak tropical storm, torrential rains from Dawn triggered catastrophic flooding in Vietnam, killing at least 187 people. Regarded as the worst cyclone to hit the region in three decades, 500,000 homes flooded, an additional 7,000 were destroyed and an estimated 2 million people were left homeless. Damage was estimated at VND 400 billion (US$28 million).

=== Tropical Storm Elvis (Miding) ===
- Tropical storm (JMA)
- Tropical storm (SSHWS)
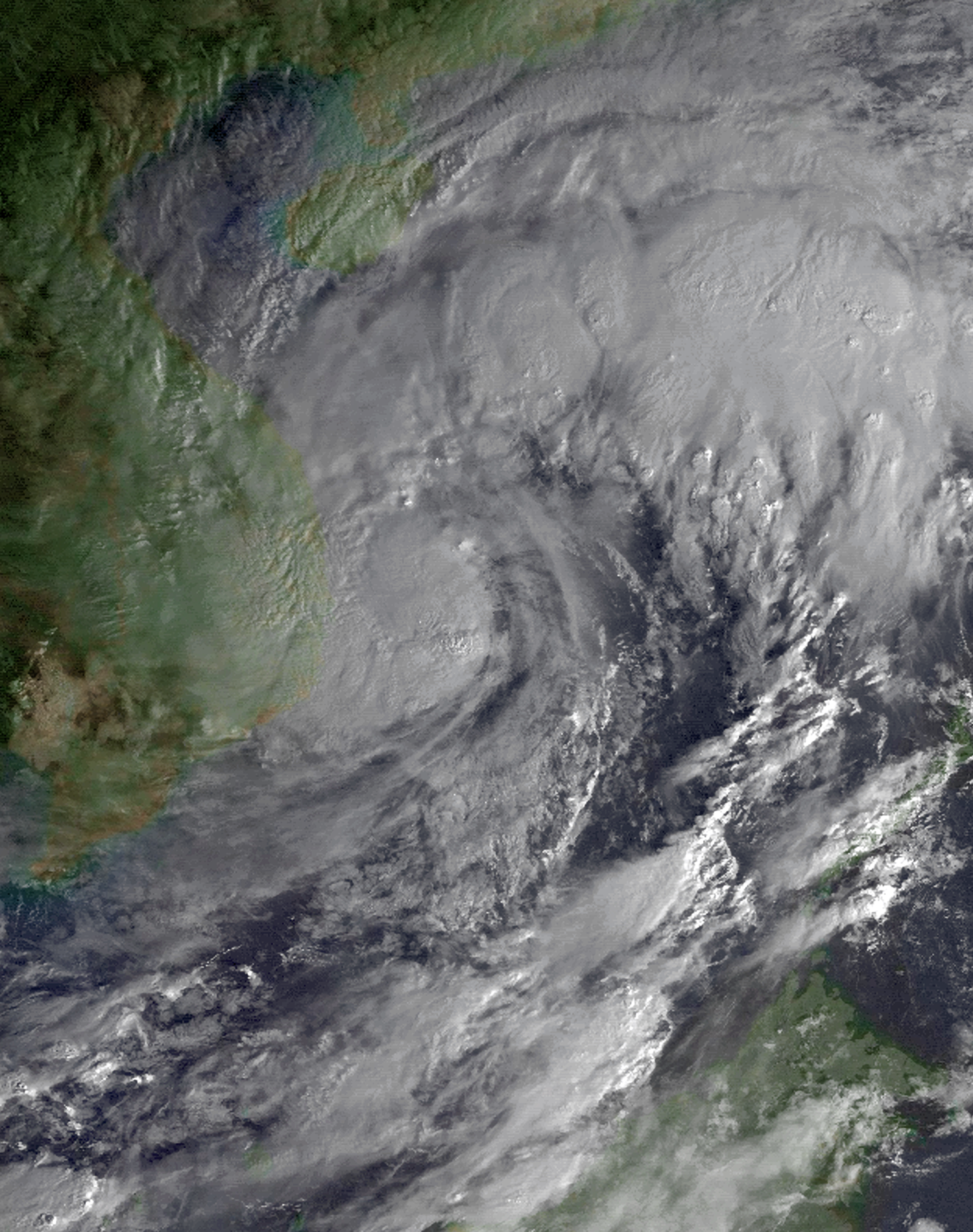
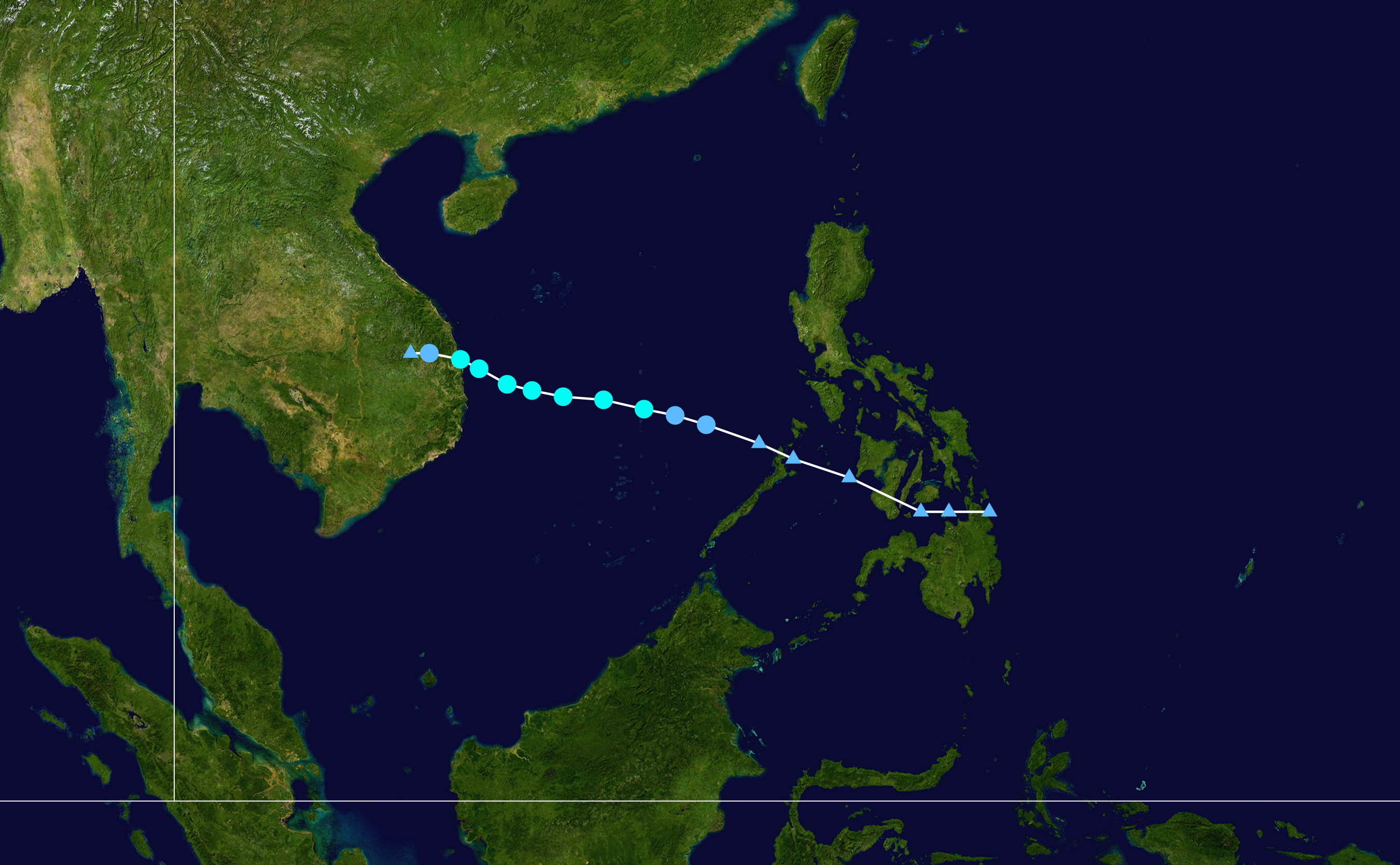
- Duration: November 22 – November 26
- Peak intensity: 75 km/h (45 mph) (10-min); 992 hPa (mbar)

Tropical Storm Elvis, also known as Miding, formed in the western Pacific Ocean during the 1998 typhoon season. It developed into a tropical storm on November 22 and made landfall in Vietnam on November 24. Despite its relatively short lifespan, Elvis caused significant damage and loss of life in Vietnam. The storm brought heavy rainfall, strong winds, and storm surges to the coastal regions of Vietnam, resulting in widespread flooding and landslides. The storm claimed the lives of at least 49 people and caused millions of dollars in damage to infrastructure and agriculture. Elvis killed 49 people and caused $30 million in damages in Vietnam.

=== Typhoon Faith (Norming) ===
- Typhoon (JMA)
- Category 2 typhoon (SSHWS)
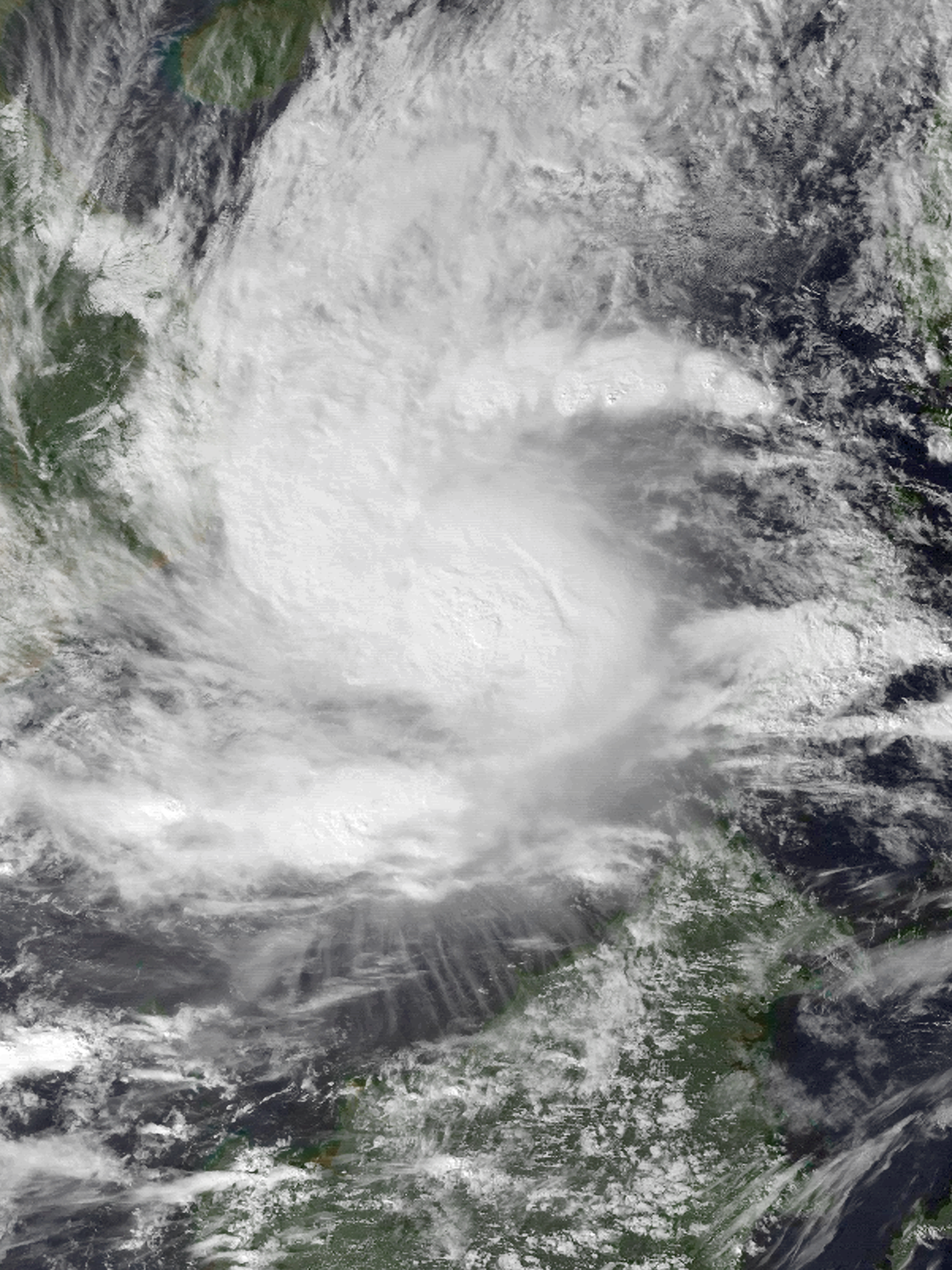
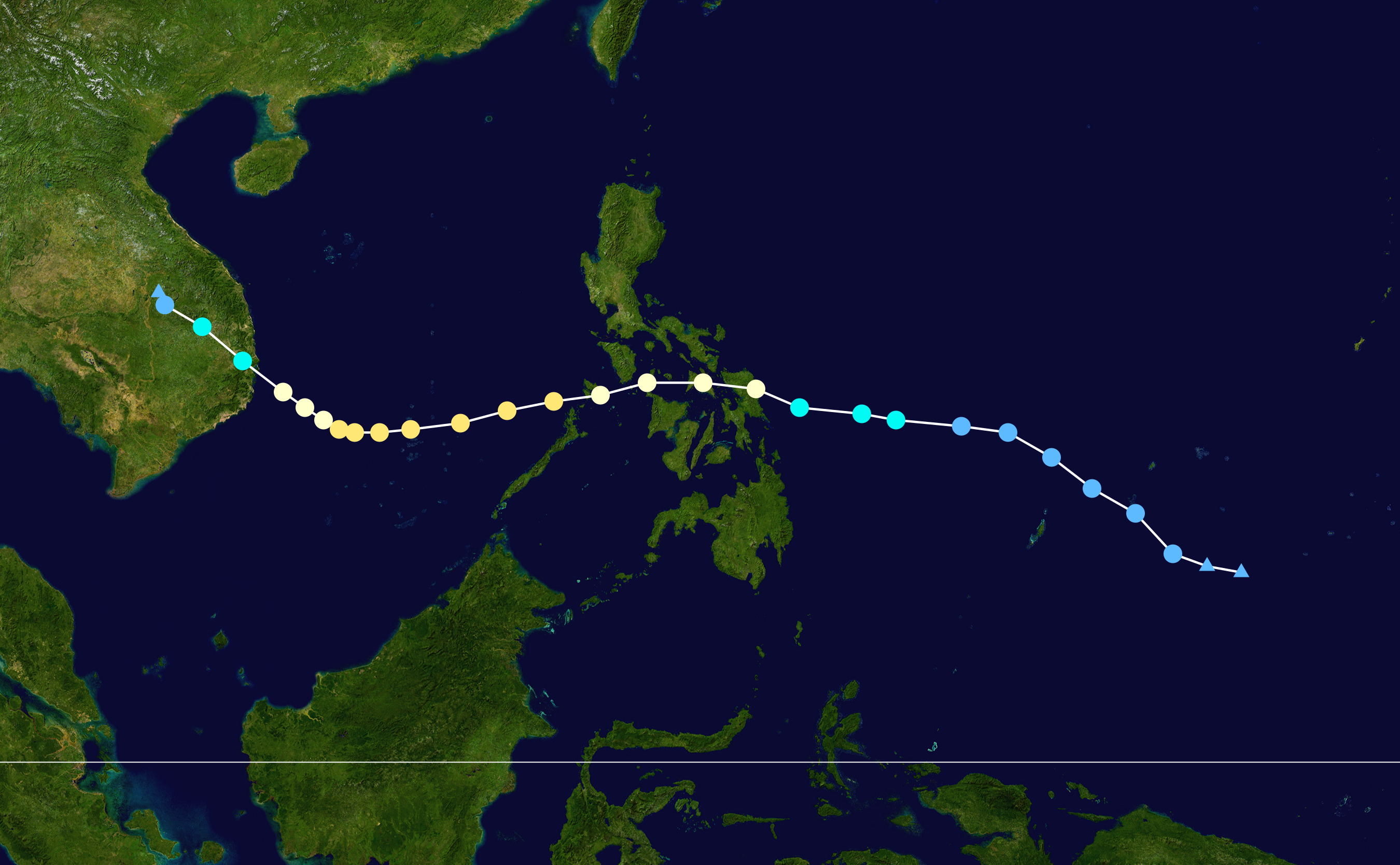
- Duration: December 8 – December 14
- Peak intensity: 120 km/h (75 mph) (10-min); 970 hPa (mbar)

Tropical Storm Faith moved westward across the northwestern Pacific. It strengthened to a typhoon just as it crossed over the Philippines, an area hit by several typhoons this season. After reaching a peak of 100 mph (160 km/h) winds over the South China Sea, Faith weakened to a tropical storm on December 14 just before making landfall on eastern Vietnam. It dissipated later that day.

In the Philippines, a total of eight people were killed and 17 others were reported as missing. Throughout the country, 51,785 people were displaced and another 20,419 were evacuated. Damages amounted to PHP 513.95 million (US$13 million). In Vietnam, 40 people were killed and three others were left missing. A total of 602 homes were destroyed, another 16,327 were damaged, and 58,487 ha of rice fields were inundated. Damages in the country amounted to VND 204 billion (US$15 million).

=== Tropical Storm Gil ===
- Tropical storm (JMA)
- Tropical storm (SSHWS)
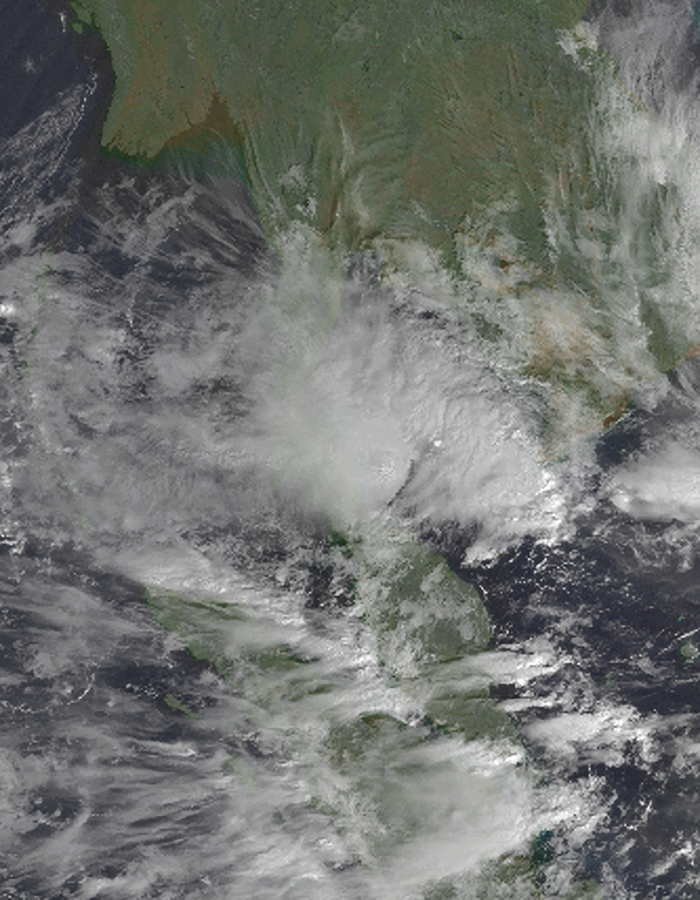
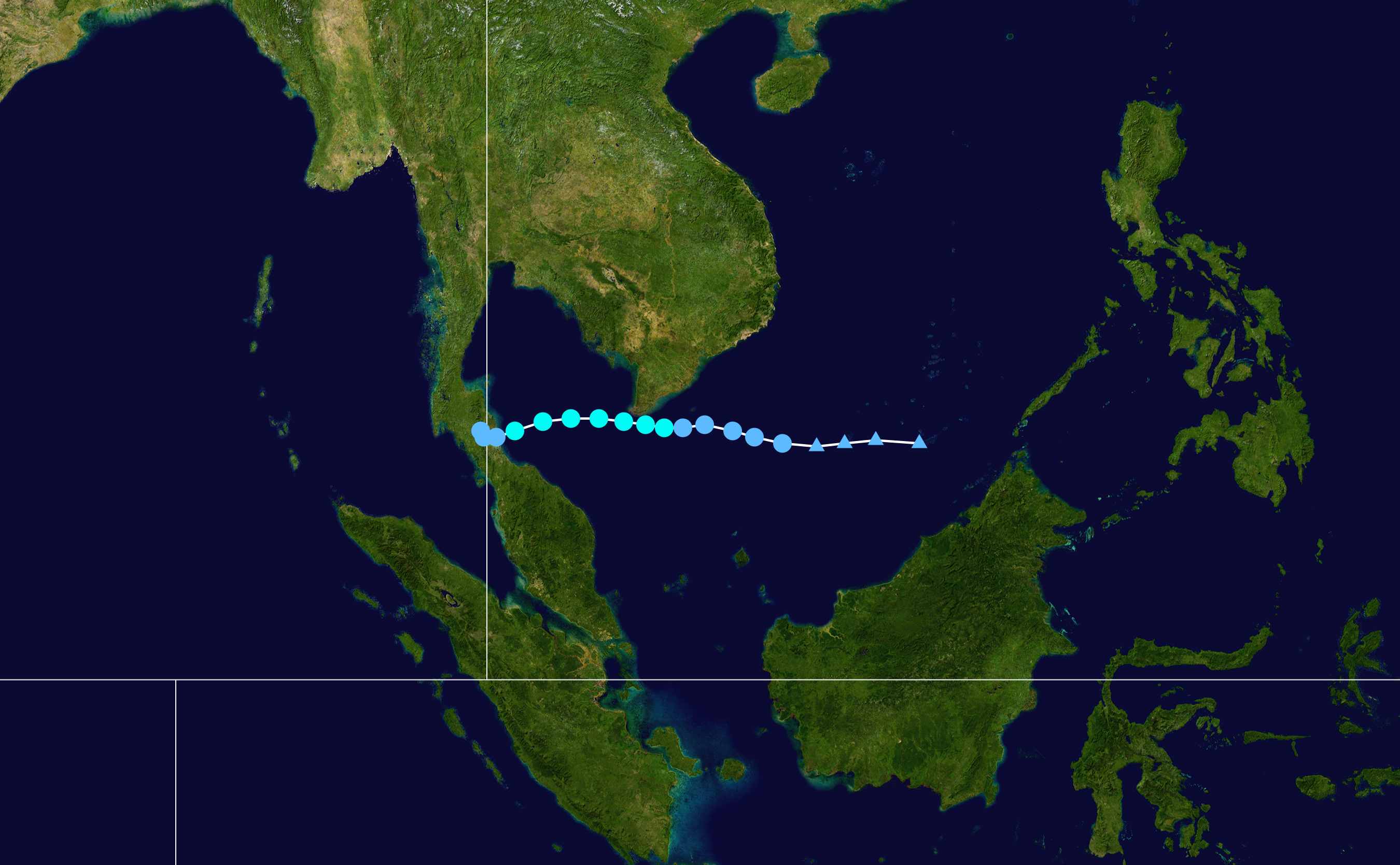
- Duration: December 9 – December 12
- Peak intensity: 75 km/h (45 mph) (10-min); 992 hPa (mbar)

Tropical Storm Gil developed in the South China Sea on December 8. It moved westward and peaked with winds of 75 km/h (45 mph). Gil made landfall in Thailand as a tropical depression which caused a plane crash at Surat Thani due to bad weather before dissipating on December 13.

=== Tropical Depression 26W ===
- Tropical depression (SSHWS)
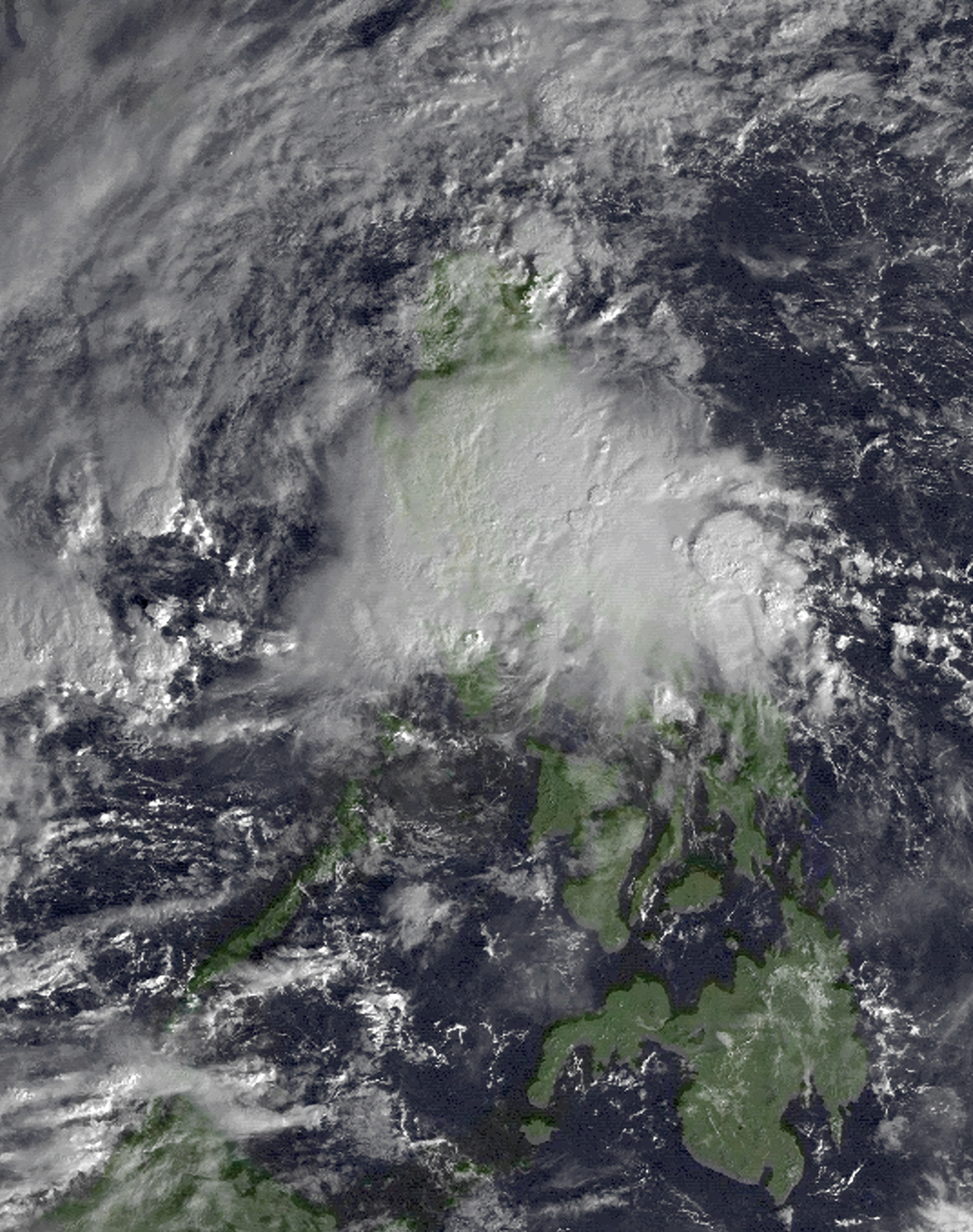
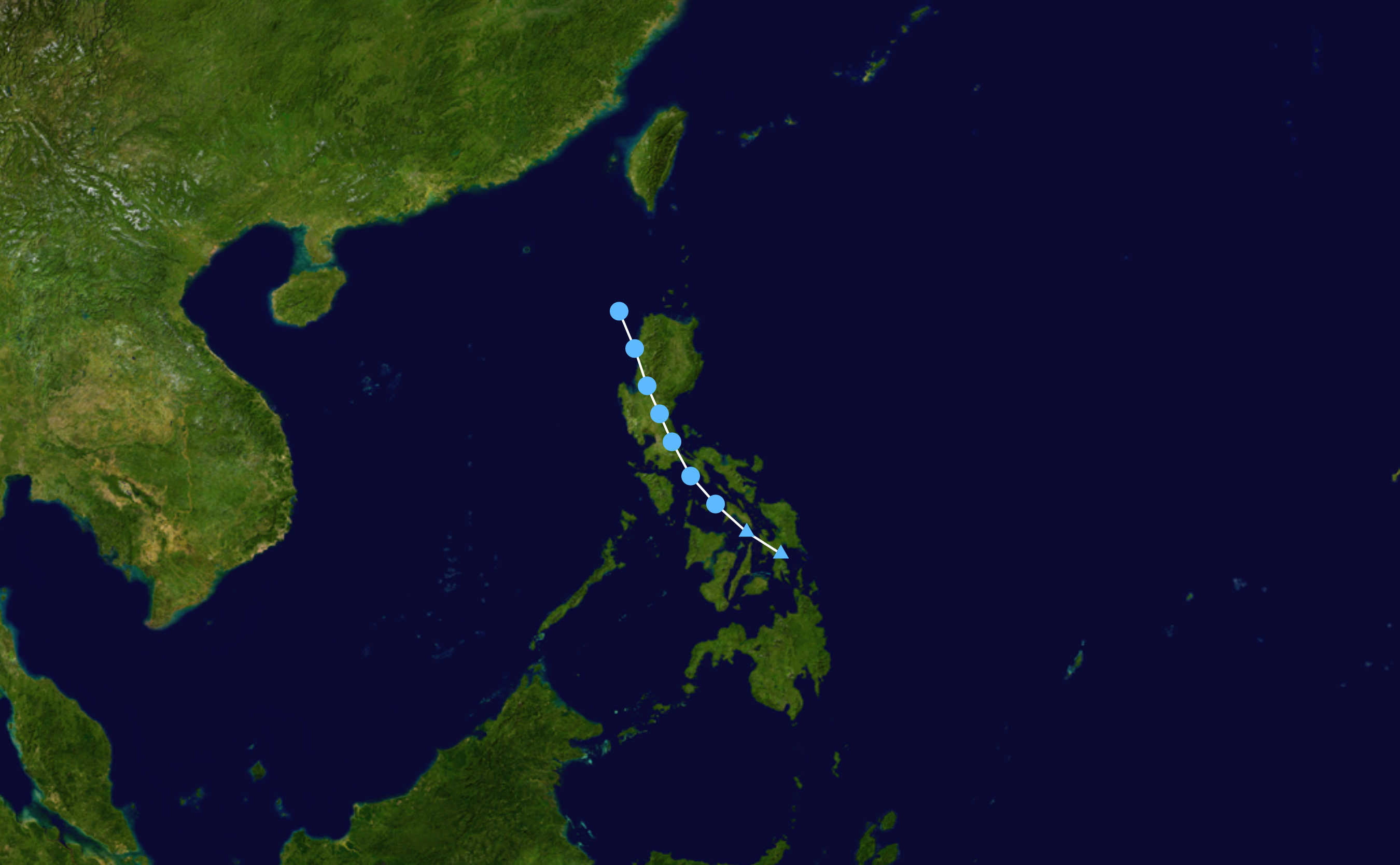
- Duration: December 17 – December 19
- Peak intensity: 45 km/h (30 mph) (1-min); 1002 hPa (mbar)

Tropical Depression 26W formed in the Western Pacific Ocean in mid-December 1998. It was a weak tropical cyclone that did not significantly impact any land areas. The depression formed in a region with unfavorable environmental conditions, which limited its development and intensity. As a result, it dissipated shortly after its formation, leaving minimal impact on the region.

=== Tropical Depression 27W ===
- Tropical depression (SSHWS)
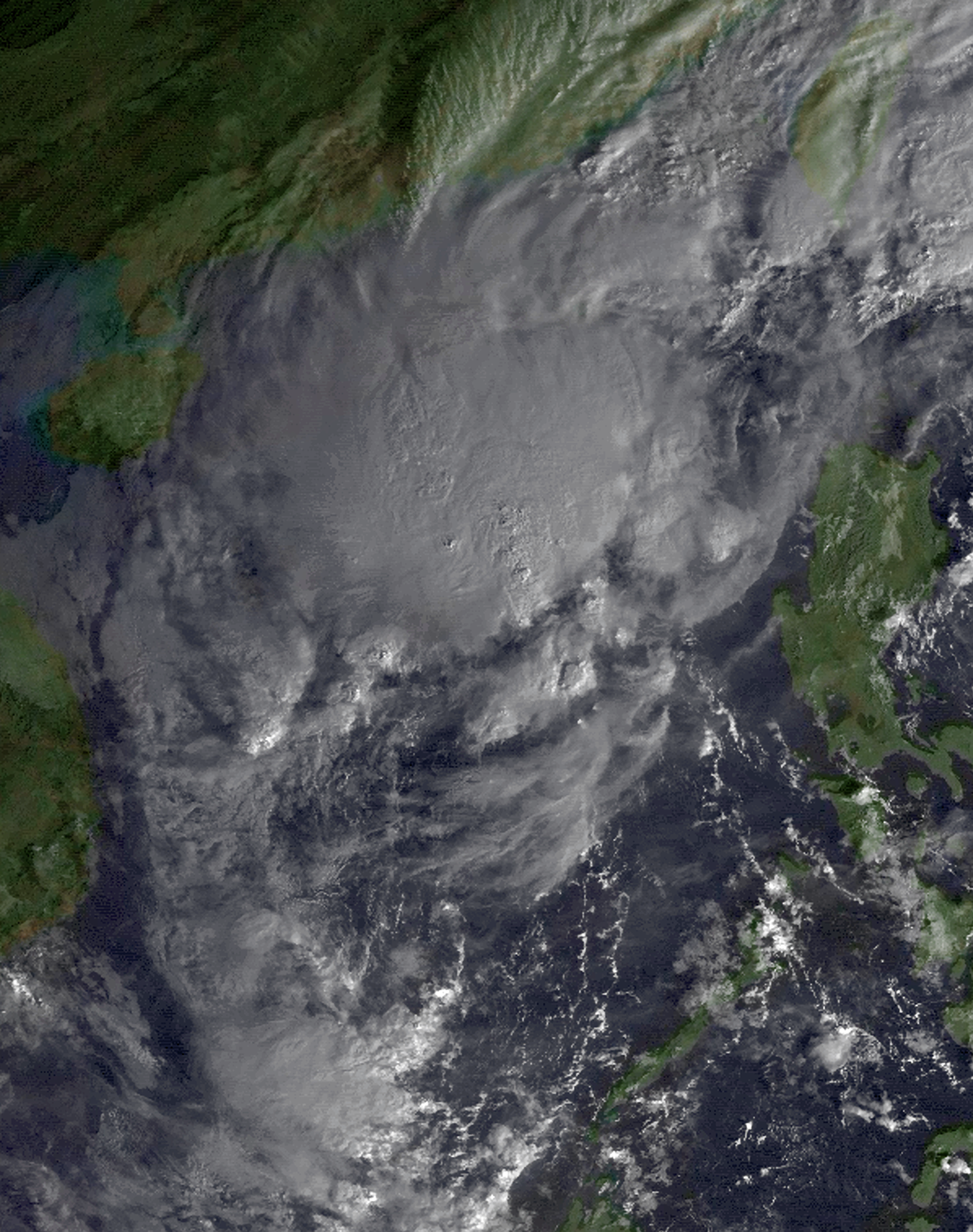
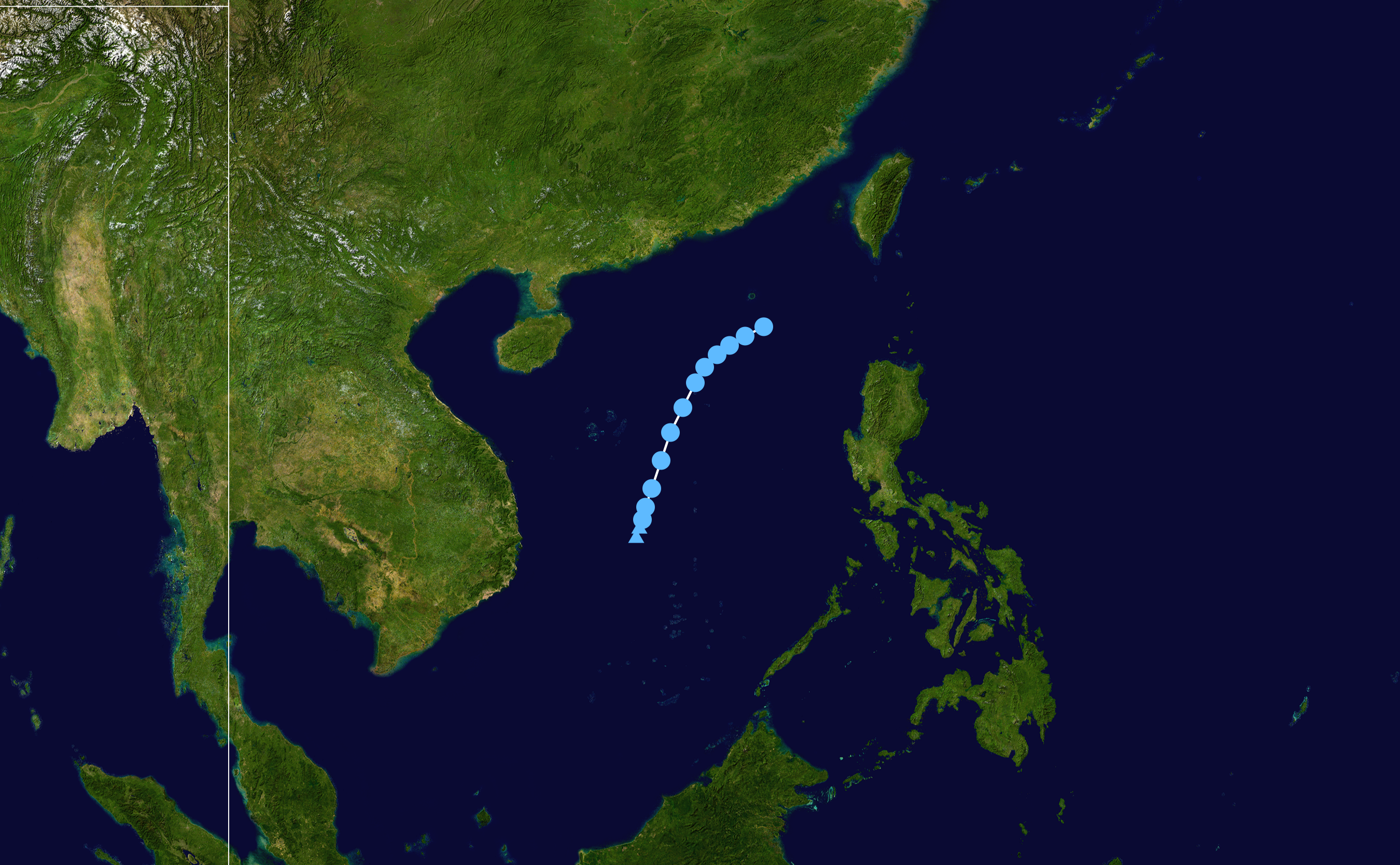
- Duration: December 19 – December 21
- Peak intensity: 55 km/h (35 mph) (1-min); 1000 hPa (mbar)

The final tropical depression of the season developed from a poorly organized tropical disturbance on December 18 over the South China Sea. Situated within an unfavorable environment, the system struggled to maintain deep convection; however, the following day, it was classified as Tropical Depression 27W by the JTWC. Operationally, 27W was regarded as a tropical storm, with maximum winds of 75 km/h (45 mph) but in post-season analysis, the intensity was lowered to 55 km/h (35 mph).

== Storm names ==
During the season 17 named tropical cyclones developed in the Western Pacific and were named by the Joint Typhoon Warning Center, when it was determined that they had become tropical storms. These names were contributed to a revised list which started on 1996.

Nichole	Otto	Penny	Rex	Stella	Todd	Vicki	Waldo	Yanni
Zeb	Alex	Babs	Chip	Dawn	Elvis	Faith	Gil	

=== Philippines ===
Akang	Bising	Klaring	Deling	Emang
Gading	Heling	Iliang	Loleng	Miding
Norming	Oyang (unused)	Pasing (unused)	Ritang (unused)	Susang (unused)
Tering (unused)	Uding (unused)	Weling (unused)	Yaning (unused)	
Auxiliary list
				Aning (unused)
Bidang (unused)	Katring (unused)	Delang (unused)	Esang (unused)	Garding (unused)

The Philippine Atmospheric, Geophysical and Astronomical Services Administration uses its own naming scheme for tropical cyclones in their area of responsibility. PAGASA assigns names to tropical depressions that form within their area of responsibility and any tropical cyclone that might move into their area of responsibility. Should the list of names for a given year prove to be insufficient, names are taken from an auxiliary list, the first 10 of which are published each year before the season starts. This is the same list used for the 1994 season. PAGASA uses its own naming scheme that starts in the Filipino alphabet, with names of Filipino female names ending with "ng" (A, B, K, D, etc.). Because PAGASA started a new naming scheme in 2001, therefore, this naming list was not used in the 2002 season. Names that were not assigned/going to use are marked in gray.

== Season effects ==
This table summarizes all the systems that developed within or moved into the North Pacific Ocean, to the west of the International Date Line during 1998. The tables also provide an overview of a systems intensity, duration, land areas affected and any deaths or damages associated with the system.

Name	Dates	Peak intensity			Areas affected	Damage (USD)	Deaths	Ref(s).
Name	Dates	Category	Wind speed	Pressure	Areas affected	Damage (USD)	Deaths	Ref(s).
TD	May 28 – 29	Tropical depression	Not specified	1002 hPa (29.59 inHg)	Taiwan, Ryukyu Islands	None	None	
01W (Akang)	July 7 – 12	Tropical depression	55 km/h (35 mph)	1002 hPa (29.59 inHg)	None	None	None	
Nichole	July 8 – 10	Tropical storm	65 km/h (40 mph)	998 hPa (29.47 inHg)	Taiwan, China	None	None	
TD	July 23 - 25	Tropical depression	Not specified	1004 hPa (29.65 inHg)	None	None	None	
03W	July 25	Tropical depression	55 km/h (35 mph)	1008 hPa (29.77 inHg)	None	None	None	
Otto (Bising)	August 1 – 6	Strong typhoon	120 km/h (75 mph)	970 hPa (28.64 inHg)	Philippines, Taiwan, East China	$761,000	5	
Penny (Klaring)	August 6 – 11	Severe tropical storm	95 km/h (60 mph)	985 hPa (29.09 inHg)	Philippines, South China	None	1	
TD	August 21 – 22	Tropical depression	Not specified	1004 hPa (29.65 inHg)	None	None	None	
Rex (Deling)	August 23 – September 6	Strong typhoon	140 km/h (85 mph)	955 hPa (28.20 inHg)	Japan	$33,000	25	
07W	August 31 – September 5	Tropical depression	55 km/h (35 mph)	1002 hPa (29.59 inHg)	None	None	None	
TD	September 7 – 8	Tropical depression	Not specified	1004 hPa (29.65 inHg)	None	None	None	
Stella	September 11 – 16	Severe tropical storm	95 km/h (60 mph)	985 hPa (29.09 inHg)	Mariana Islands, Japan	$2.17 million	3	
09W	September 13 – 14	Tropical depression	55 km/h (35 mph)	998 hPa (29.47 inHg)	South China, Vietnam	None	None	
Todd (Emang)	September 15 – 20	Strong typhoon	140 km/h (85 mph)	955 hPa (28.20 inHg)	Japan, East China	$236,500	7	
Vicki (Gading)	September 17 – 22	Strong typhoon	140 km/h (85 mph)	960 hPa (28.35 inHg)	Philippines, Japan	$1.22 billion	108	
12W	September 18 – 19	Tropical depression	55 km/h (35 mph)	1000 hPa (29.53 inHg)	Vietnam	None	None	
Waldo	September 19 – 21	Tropical storm	85 km/h (50 mph)	994 hPa (29.35 inHg)	Japan	$78.6 million	None	
Yanni (Heling)	September 26 – 30	Strong typhoon	120 km/h (75 mph)	965 hPa (28.50 inHg)	Taiwan, Ryukyu Islands, South Korea	$45.8 million	50	
15W	October 2 – 5	Tropical depression	55 km/h (35 mph)	1000 hPa (29.53 inHg)	South China, Vietnam	None	None	
16W	October 4 – 7	Tropical depression	55 km/h (35 mph)	1010 hPa (29.83 inHg)	Taiwan, Ryukyu Islands	None	None	
17W	October 5 – 6	Tropical depression	55 km/h (35 mph)	1008 hPa (29.77 inHg)	Ryukyu Islands	None	None	
Zeb (Iliang)	October 10 – 17	Violent typhoon	205 km/h (125 mph)	900 hPa (26.58 inHg)	Caroline Islands, Taiwan, Philippines, Japan	$576 million	122	
Alex	October 11	Tropical depression	65 km/h (40 mph)	1006 hPa (29.71 inHg)	None	None	None	
Babs (Loleng)	October 14 – 27	Very strong typhoon	155 km/h (100 mph)	940 hPa (27.76 inHg)	Caroline Islands, Philippines, China, Taiwan, Ryukyu Islands	$203 million	327	
TD	November 4 – 7	Tropical depression	Not specified	1004 hPa (29.65 inHg)	None	None	None	
Chip	November 11 – 17	Tropical storm	75 km/h (45 mph)	994 hPa (29.35 inHg)	Vietnam	$923,400	17	
Dawn	November 16 – 20	Tropical storm	65 km/h (40 mph)	998 hPa (29.47 inHg)	Vietnam, Cambodia	$28 million	187	
07B	November 16 – 17	Tropical depression	55 km/h (35 mph)	1004 hPa (29.65 inHg)	Malay Peninsula	None	None	
Elvis (Miding)	November 22 – 26	Tropical storm	75 km/h (45 mph)	992 hPa (29.29 inHg)	Philippines, Vietnam	$30 million	49	
Faith (Norming)	December 8 – 14	Strong typhoon	120 km/h (75 mph)	970 hPa (28.64 inHg)	Caroline Islands, Philippines, Vietnam, Laos	$28 million	66	
Gil	December 9 – 12	Tropical storm	75 km/h (45 mph)	992 hPa (29.29 inHg)	Vietnam, Thailand	None	None	
26W	December 17 – 19	Tropical depression	45 km/h (30 mph)	1006 hPa (29.71 inHg)	Philippines	None	None	
27W	December 19 – 21	Tropical depression	55 km/h (35 mph)	1002 hPa (29.59 inHg)	None	None	None	
Season aggregates
33 systems	May 28 – December 21		205 km/h (125 mph)	900 hPa (26.58 inHg)		$2.23 billion	967	

== See also ==
- 1998 Pacific hurricane season
- 1998 Atlantic hurricane season
- 1998 North Indian Ocean cyclone season
- 1998–99 Southern Hemisphere tropical cyclone season
