= 17f =

17f or variation, may refer to:

- Highway 17F; see List of highways numbered 17F
- Tropical Depression 17F
  - Tropical Depression 17F (1999)
  - Tropical Depression 17F (2000)
  - Tropical Depression 17F (2005)
  - Tropical Depression 17F (2017)
- Flottille 17F (17F flotilla), French Naval Aviation squadron
- Ian Fleming (codenamed "17F" in Naval Intelligence), British author and WWII spy

== See also ==
- F17 (disambiguation)
- 17 (disambiguation)
- F (disambiguation)
