= Class 17 =

Class 17 may refer to:

- APL-17-class barracks ship
- British Rail Class 17, a British class of diesel locomotive
- DRG Class 17, a German class of 4-6-0 tender locomotive
  - Class 17.0–1: Prussian S 10
  - Class 17.1: LBE S 10, PKP Class Pk1, LG Gr10
  - Class 17.2: Prussian S 10.2, PKP Class Pk3
  - Class 17.3: Bavarian C V
  - Class 17.3^{II}:LBE S 10.2
  - Class 17.4: Bavarian S 3/5 N
  - Class 17.5: Bavarian S 3/5 H
  - Class 17.6: Saxon XII H
  - Class 17.6^{II}: BBÖ 409
  - Class 17.7: Saxon HII HV
  - Class 17.8: Saxon XII H1
  - Class 17.10–12: Prussian S 10.1
  - Class 17.11: Alsace Lorrraine S 10.1
  - Class 17.12: PKP Class Pk2 (Prussian S 10.1)
- GWR 17 Class
- LNER Class B17
- New South Wales Z17 class locomotive, steam locomotive
- NSB Cmb Class 17
- NSB El 17, a Norwegian class of electric locomotive
- R-17-class lifeboat
- South African Class 17 4-8-0TT

== See also ==
- Class (disambiguation)
- C17 (disambiguation)
- 17 (disambiguation)
- Type 17 (disambiguation)
- Model 17 (disambiguation)
