= Glycerol-2-phosphatase =

Class of enzymes

glycerol-2-phosphatase

Identifiers
- EC no.: 3.1.3.19
- CAS no.: 9027-39-8

Databases
- BRENDA: enzyme data
- ExPASy: NiceZyme view
- KEGG: enzyme entry
- MetaCyc: metabolic pathway
- Rhea: reactions
- PDB structures: RCSB PDB PDBe PDBsum
- Gene Ontology: AmiGO / QuickGO
Search
- PMC: articles
- PubMed: articles
- NCBI: proteins

The enzyme glycerol-2-phosphatase (EC 3.1.3.19) catalyzes the reaction

glycerol 2-phosphate
H_{2}O
P_{i}
glycerol

The enzyme characterised from bakers' yeast hydrolyses glycerol 2-phosphate to glycerol and orthophosphate. The enzyme has also been found in cotton fibre. A genomics study has been done.

This enzyme is a hydrolase, specifically one acting on phosphoric monoester bonds. The systematic name is glycerol-2-phosphate phosphohydrolase. Other names in common use include β-glycerophosphatase, β-glycerophosphate phosphatase, and 2-glycerophosphatase.
