= NS17 =

NS17, NS 17, NS-17, NS.17, or variation, may refer to:

== Places ==
- Bishan MRT station (station code: NS17), Bishan, Singapore; a mass transit station
- Dartmouth North (constituency N.S. 17), Nova Scotia, Canada; a provincial electoral district
- Saramacca District (FIPS region code NS17), Suriname

== Other uses ==
- Norfolk Southern NS17, a preserved sleeper railcar at the Southeastern Railway Museum
- Blue Origin NS-17, a 2021 August 25 suborbital spaceflight by the New Shepard
- New Penguin Shakespeare volume 17

== See also ==
- NS (disambiguation)
- 17 (disambiguation)
