= Kristine Valdresdatter =

Kristine Valdresdatter may refer to:

- Kristine Valdresdatter (film), a Norwegian film from 1935 on List of Norwegian films of the 1930s
- NSB Cmb Class 17, a Norwegian train
