= 017 =

017 may refer to:

- DOL-017, GameCube console
- Road FC 017, 2014 Mixed Martial Arts event
- Swift 017.n, racing car
- Tyrrell 017, Formula One racing car

== See also ==
- 17 (disambiguation)
