= PY-19 =

PY-19 may refer to:

- USS Carnelian, pennant number PY-19, a WWII converted yacht
- Boquerón, Paraguay, ISO 3166-2 code PY-19
