= M17 =

M17 or M-17 may refer to:

== Roads ==
- M17 road (Ireland)
- M17 road (Bosnia and Herzegovina)
- Highway M17 (Ukraine)
- M-17 (Michigan highway)
- M17 (East London), a Metropolitan Route in East London, South Africa
- M17 (Cape Town), a Metropolitan Route in Cape Town, South Africa
- M17 (Johannesburg), a Metropolitan Route in Johannesburg, South Africa
- M17 (Pretoria), a Metropolitan Route in Pretoria, South Africa
- M17 (Durban), a Metropolitan Route in Durban, South Africa
- M17 (Port Elizabeth), a Metropolitan Route in Port Elizabeth, South Africa

== Aircraft ==
- Myasishchev M-17 Stratosphera (NATO reporting name Mystic-A), an early version of the Myasishchev M-55 reconnaissance aircraft
- Miles M.17 Monarch, a 1936 British, light, touring aeroplane
- M.17, a German World War 1 prototype aircraft, the basis for one of the two Fokker B.II (1916)

== Military equipment ==
- M17 Half-Track, an anti-aircraft variant of the M5 Half-track
- M17 rifle grenade used by the United States during World War II.
- Mikulin M-17, a Soviet copy of a German aircraft engine
- SIG Sauer M17 pistol, SIG Sauer P320 used by the United States armed forces
- M17 gas mask, formerly used as a standard gas mask, for the United States Armed Forces

== Other ==
- HMS M17, First World War Royal Navy M15-class monitor
- BMW M17, car engine in the M10 family
- Mercedes-AMG F1 M17 E Performance, a 2026-spec Formula One power unit
- M17 agar, Lactococcus growth medium developed in 1971
- M17 or Messier 17, a nebula also called the Omega Nebula, the Swan Nebula, or several other names
- M17 or March 17, 2007 anti-war protest, organized by the ANSWER Coalition
- M17 Project, a free, open-source, digital communication protocol for amateur radio

== See also ==
- R-M17, Haplogroup R1a1a of the human Y-chromosome
- Bushmaster M17S, a rifle manufactured in the United States
- 17M (disambiguation)
- 17 (disambiguation)
- Model 17 (disambiguation)
