= C17 =

C17, C-17 or C.17 may refer to:

== Transportation ==
- HMS C17, a 1917 British C-class submarine

=== Air ===
- Boeing C-17 Globemaster III, a military transport aircraft
- Lockheed Y1C-17 Vega, a six-passenger monoplane
- Cierva C.17, a 1928 English experimental autogyro

=== Land ===
- C-17 highway (Spain) also known as Eix del Congost, a primary highway in Catalonia
- Queensland C17 class locomotive
- Sauber C17, a 1998 Formula One car

== Science and technology ==
- C17 (C standard revision), an informal name for ISO/IEC 9899:2018, a revision of the C programming language
- C17, a female two-pole IEC 60320 electrical cable connector that mates with a male C18 appliance inlet
- Caldwell 17, a dwarf spheroidal galaxy of the Local Group in the constellation Cassiopeia
- Carbon-17 (C-17 or ^{17}C), an isotope of carbon
- C17, a 17-Carbon molecule in chlorophyll metabolism
  - Precorrin-3B C17-methyltransferase, an enzyme involved in that metabolism
- Small intestine cancer (ICD-10 code)

== Other uses ==
- City 17, a fictional location in the Half-Life universe
- French Defence (Encyclopaedia of Chess Openings code)
- 17th century
- Android 17, character from Dragon Ball Franchise

== See also ==
- C++17 (programming language) a standard codified in 2017, part of ISO/IEC 14882
- 17 (disambiguation)
- Class 17 (disambiguation)
