= 17M =

17M may refer to:

- New York State Route 17M
- The Su-17M, a Soviet fighter plane; see Sukhoi Su-17
- The La-17M, a Soviet drone; see Lavochkin La-17
- The 17M engine, an engine model in the 1957-1971 Ford Taunus
- The DC-17M, a fictional weapon in the game Star Wars: Republic Commando

== See also ==
- M17 (disambiguation)
