= F17 =

F17 or F-17 may refer to:

- Bandy World Championship F-17, an alternative name for the Bandy World Championship G-17, a group of girls' sports tournaments held for bandy athletes
- F 17 Kallinge, an air force base in southern Sweden
- ECAN F17, a French wire-guided torpedo
- F-17 or ^{17}F, an abbreviation for Fluorine-17, an isotope of fluorine
- Formula 17, a 2004 Taiwanese film
- Italian submarine F17, an Italian Regia Marina (Royal Navy) submarine in commission from 1917 to 1929
- JF-17 Thunder, a fighter aircraft built by China and Pakistan
- Northrop YF-17, an American prototype fighter aircraft of the 1970s

== See also ==
- f (disambiguation)
- 17 (disambiguation)
- 17f (disambiguation)
