= Type 17 =

Type 17 may refer to:

- F.B.A. Type 17, a training flying boat produced in France in the 1920s
- Shansi Type 17, a Chinese made version of the Mauser C96
- Bugatti Type 17, a Bugatti car
- Bristol Type 17, a British two-seat biplane fighter and reconnaissance aircraft
- Nieuport Type 17, a French biplane fighter aircraft of World War I
- Polikarpov I-16 Type 17, a Soviet fighter aircraft of revolutionary design
- Albatros B.II Type 17, an unarmed German two-seat reconnaissance biplane
- type-17, thread-cutting tip for screws and augers

== See also ==
- Type (disambiguation)
- T17 (disambiguation)
- 17 (disambiguation)
- Class 17 (disambiguation)
- Model 17 (disambiguation)
