= Model 17 =

Model 17 may refer to:

== Aircraft ==
- Beechcraft Model 17 Staggerwing, 1930s U.S. biplane with negative wing stagger
- Bell Model 17 Airacuda, 1940s U.S. heavy fighter
- Consolidated Model 17, 1920s U.S. cargo monoplane
- Curtiss Model 17, 1920s U.S. biplane
- FBA Model 17, 1920s French flying boat trainer

== Firearms ==
- Glock model 17 gun
- Remington Model 17 pump-action shotgun
- Smith & Wesson Model 17 double-action sixshooter revolver

== Other uses ==
- Model 17 grenade (Eierhandgranate), German WWI handgrenade

== See also ==
- SIG Sauer M2017 pistol (Model 2017)
- Model 1817 common rifle, U.S. flintlock
- M1917 (disambiguation), including Model 1917
- Model (disambiguation)
- M17 (disambiguation)
- 17 (disambiguation)
- Type 17 (disambiguation)
- Class 17 (disambiguation)
