= Glycerol 2-phosphate =

Names
- Preferred IUPAC name 1,3-Dihydroxypropan-2-yl dihydrogen phosphate
- Other names 1,2,3-Propanetriol, 2-(dihydrogen phosphate); Glycerol 2-phosphate β-Glycerophosphate β-Phosphoglycerol; BGP

Identifiers
CAS Number	17181-54-3
3D model (JSmol)	Interactive image
ChEBI	CHEBI:17270
ChEMBL	ChEMBL1232903
ChemSpider	2431
DrugBank	DB01779
ECHA InfoCard	100.037.465
EC Number	241-228-2
KEGG	C02979
MeSH	Beta-glycerophosphoric+acid
PubChem CID	2526
UNII	WWH06G87W6
CompTox Dashboard (EPA)	DTXSID1023106
- InChI: InChI=1S/C3H9O6P/c4-1-3(2-5)9-10(6,7)8/h3-5H,1-2H2,(H2,6,7,8) Key: DHCLVCXQIBBOPH-UHFFFAOYSA-N
- SMILES: C(C(CO)OP(=O)(O)O)O

Properties
Chemical formula	C_{3}H_{9}O_{6}P
Molar mass	172.073 g·mol^{−1}
Appearance	forms colorless salts

Related compounds
Related organophosphates	Glycerol 1-phosphate Glycerol 3-phosphate
- Except where otherwise noted, data are given for materials in their standard state (at 25 °C [77 °F], 100 kPa). Infobox references

Glycerol 2-phosphate is the conjugate base of phosphoric ester of glycerol. It is commonly known as β-glycerophosphate or BGP. Unlike glycerol 1-phosphate and glycerol 3-phosphate, this isomer is not chiral. It is also less common.

== Applications ==
β-Glycerophosphate is an inhibitor of the enzyme serine/threonine phosphatase. It is often used in combination with other phosphatase/protease inhibitors for broad spectrum inhibition.

Although previously presumed to be non-transportable and reliant on extracellular phosphatases such as alkaline phosphatase (PhoA) for utilization, recent research indicates that Escherichia coli can use β-Glycerophosphate as a sole phosphorus source in the absence of PhoA, relying on the Ugp transporter system encoded by the ugpBAECQ operon.

β-Glycerophosphate is also used to drive osteogenic differentiation of bone marrow stem cells in vitro.

β-Glycerophosphate is used to buffer M17 media for Lactococcus culture in recombinant protein expression.

== Formation ==
Glycerol 2-phosphate (G2P) can be formed through abiotic phosphorylation under prebiotic conditions, as demonstrated in laboratory simulations of early Earth environments. In the presence of urea and heat, glycerol and phosphate undergo regioselective phosphorylation, favoring the 2-position to yield G2P. This process suggests a plausible prebiotic pathway for the synthesis of key metabolic intermediates like G2P, which may have contributed to the origin of biological phospholipid synthesis prior to enzymatic catalysis.
