= 1998–99 South Pacific cyclone season =

Tropical cyclone season

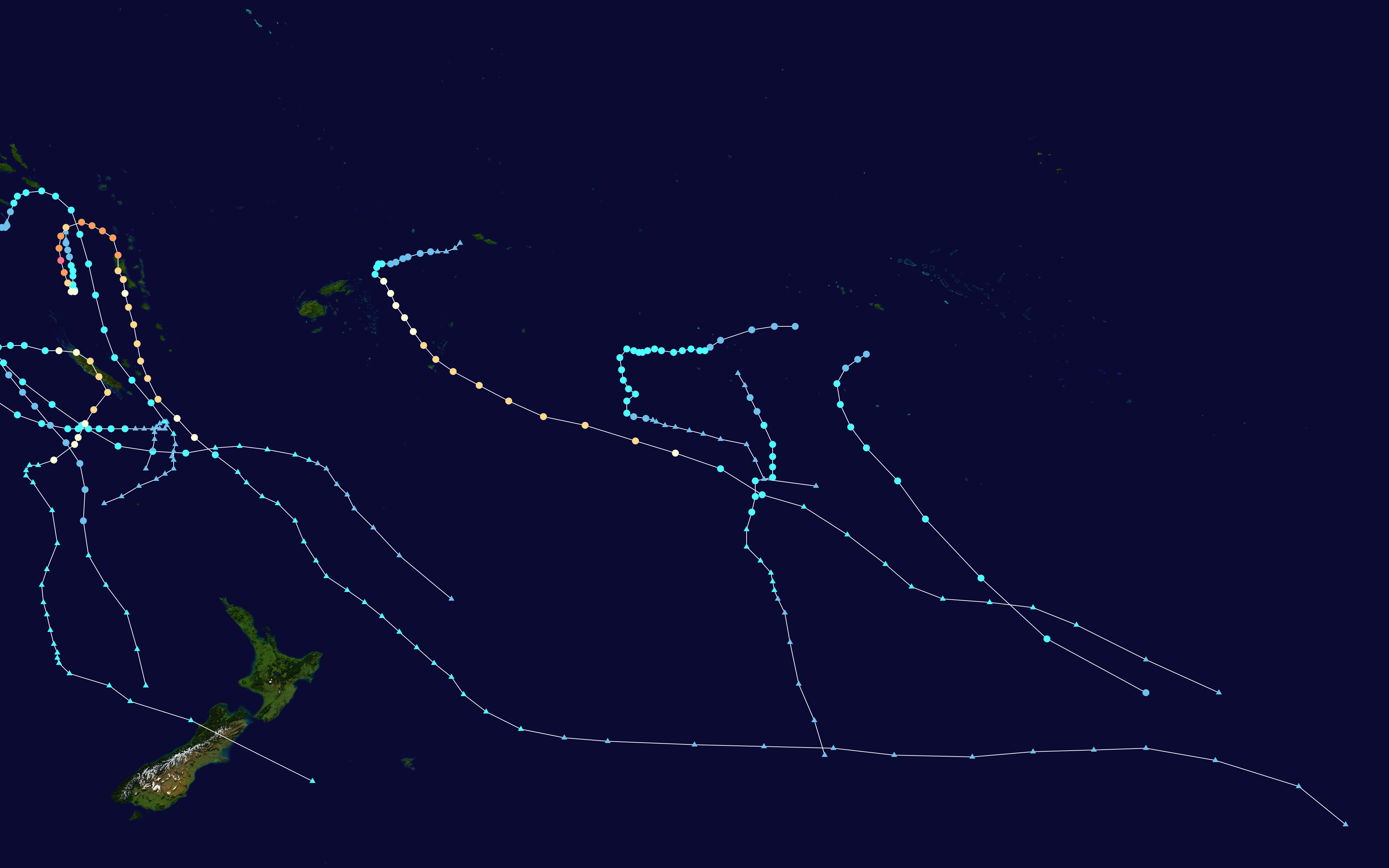
- Season summary map

Seasonal boundaries
- First system formed: December 4, 1998
- Last system dissipated: May 26, 1999

Strongest storm
- Name: Dani
  - Maximum winds: 175 km/h (110 mph) (10-minute sustained)
  - Lowest pressure: 930 hPa (mbar)

Seasonal statistics
- Total disturbances: 27 (record high)
- Total depressions: 14
- Tropical cyclones: 8
- Severe tropical cyclones: 4
- Total fatalities: Unknown
- Total damage: Unknown

Related articles
- 1998–99 Australian region cyclone season; 1998–99 South-West Indian Ocean cyclone season

The 1998–99 South Pacific cyclone season was a near average South Pacific tropical cyclone season, with 8 tropical cyclones occurring within the South Pacific Ocean basin between 160°E and 120°W. Despite the season starting on November 1, the first tropical system of the season did not form until December 1, while the final disturbance of the season dissipated on May 27, 1999. During the season the most intense tropical cyclone was Severe Tropical Cyclone Cora, which had a minimum pressure of 930 hPa (27.46 inHg). After the season had ended the names Cora and Dani were retired from the naming lists, after they had caused significant impacts to South Pacific islands.

During the season, tropical cyclones were officially monitored by the Regional Specialized Meteorological Center (RSMC) in Nadi, Fiji and the Tropical Cyclone Warning Center in Wellington, New Zealand. While the United States Navy also monitored the basin and issued unofficial warnings throughout the season, through its Joint Typhoon Warning Center (JTWC) and Naval Pacific Meteorology and Oceanography Center (NPMOC). Tropical cyclones that were located between 160°E and 120°W as well as the Equator and 25°S were monitored by TCWC Nadi while any that were located to the south of 25°S between 160°E and 120°W were monitored by TCWC Wellington. During the season the JTWC issued warnings on any tropical cyclone that was located between 160°E and the 180° while the NPMOC issued warnings for tropical cyclones forming between 180° and the American coast. the FMS and TCWC Wellington both used the Australian tropical cyclone intensity scale, and measured windspeeds over a 10-minute period, while the JTWC and the NPMOC measured sustained windspeeds over a 1-minute period. For the first time this season, the FMS assigned a number and the letter F to each significant tropical disturbance that moved within the South Pacific basin, while the JTWC and NPMOC continued to assign a number and the letter P to significant tropical cyclones throughout the Southern Hemisphere.

== Seasonal summary ==
In direct contrast to the previous season when an El Niño episode was observed, 1998–99 was characterised by a La Niña episode, which contributed to the slump in activity that was observed during the season. In total 27 Tropical Disturbances and Tropical Depressions developed, of which 8 developed further into tropical cyclones and severe tropical cyclones. The shift from El Niño to a La Niña also helped shift the mean genesis area into the Coral Sea area from just east of the Northern Cook Islands, with 5 of the 8 cyclones during the season developing in that area.

== Systems ==
=== Tropical Depression 07P ===
- Tropical depression (Australian scale)
- Tropical depression (SSHWS)
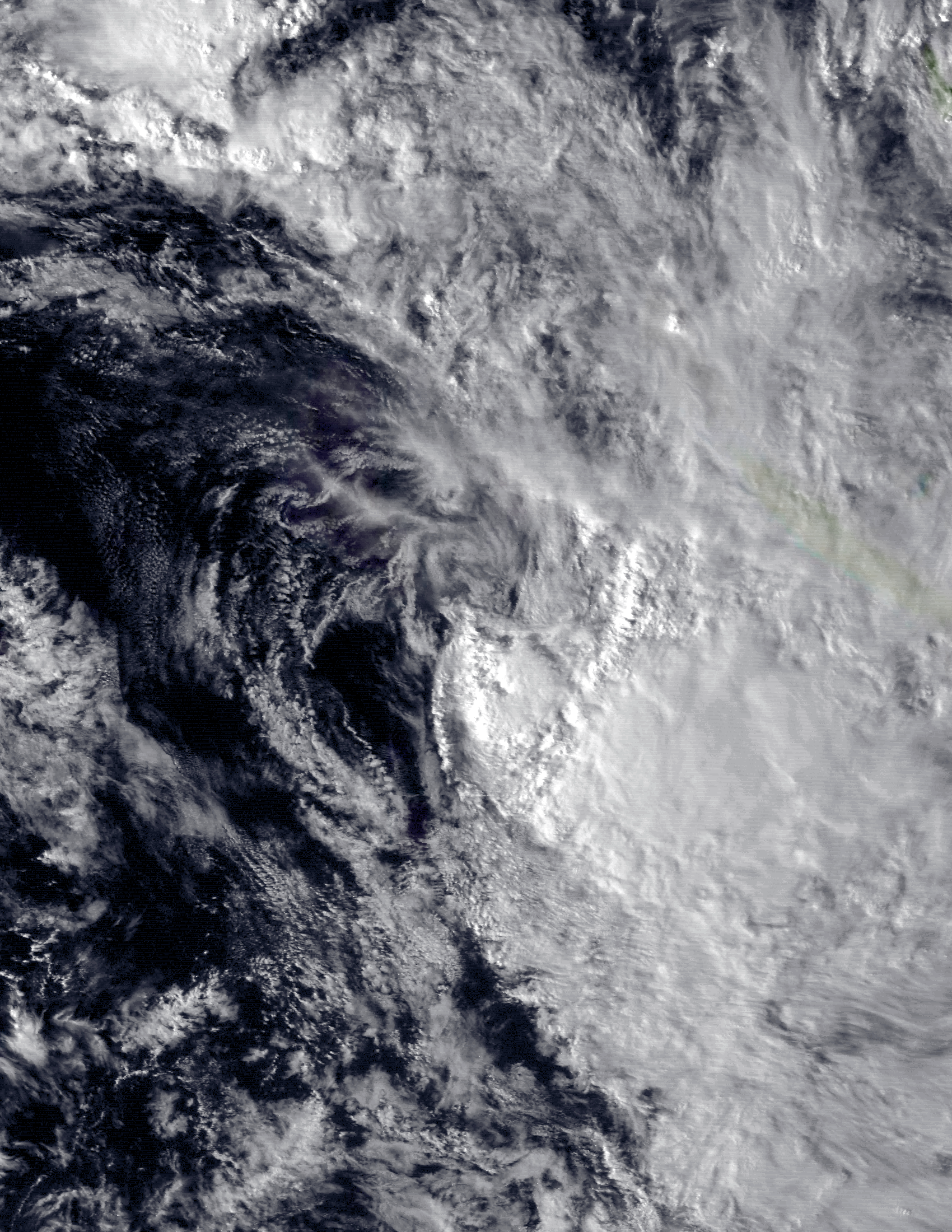
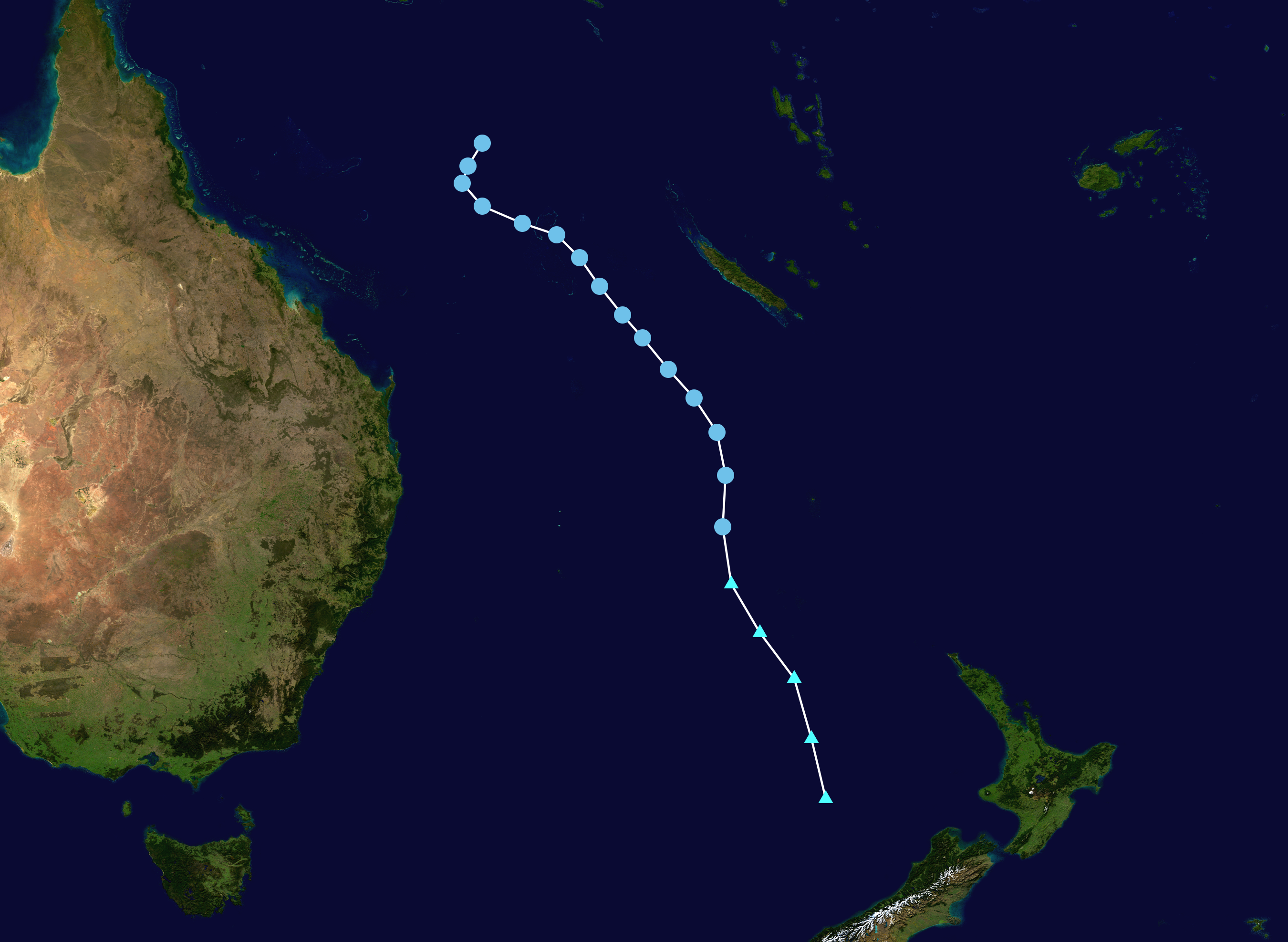
- Duration: December 14 – December 17
- Peak intensity: 75 km/h (45 mph) (10-min); 999 hPa (mbar)

On December 11, the JTWC started to monitor an area of disturbed weather had developed within a trough of low pressure, about 670 km (415 mi) to the northeast of Honiara in the Solomon Islands. Over the next couple of days the disturbed weather drifted towards the west and moved into the eastern portion of the Australian region. By late on December 14 a tropical disturbance had developed on the south-eastern end of the trough, before as it moved back into the South Pacific region, the FMS declared it a tropical depression. (Note: 07P was not assigned an "F" designator because the depression had originated in the Australian region.)

JTWC initiated warnings on the system at 15/0900 UTC due to a ship report of 34 kn at 0000 UTC. Bulletins from Nadi alluded to gales being present in the southern and eastern quadrants, but since they were not surrounding the center, the depression was not named as a tropical cyclone. The depression moved southeastward roughly parallel to and several hundred miles southwest of New Caledonia. By 0600 UTC on December 16 the system was about 250 nmi southwest of Nouméa and had moved across 25S and into the AOR of the Wellington, New Zealand, office. The depression turned to the south and accelerated as it began to lose tropical characteristics. It passed about 210 nmi west of Norfolk Island at 1700 UTC, and had become extratropical about 400 nmi west-northwest of New Zealand's North Cape by 0500 UTC on December 17.

=== Tropical Depression 02F ===
- Tropical depression (Australian scale)
- Tropical storm (SSHWS)
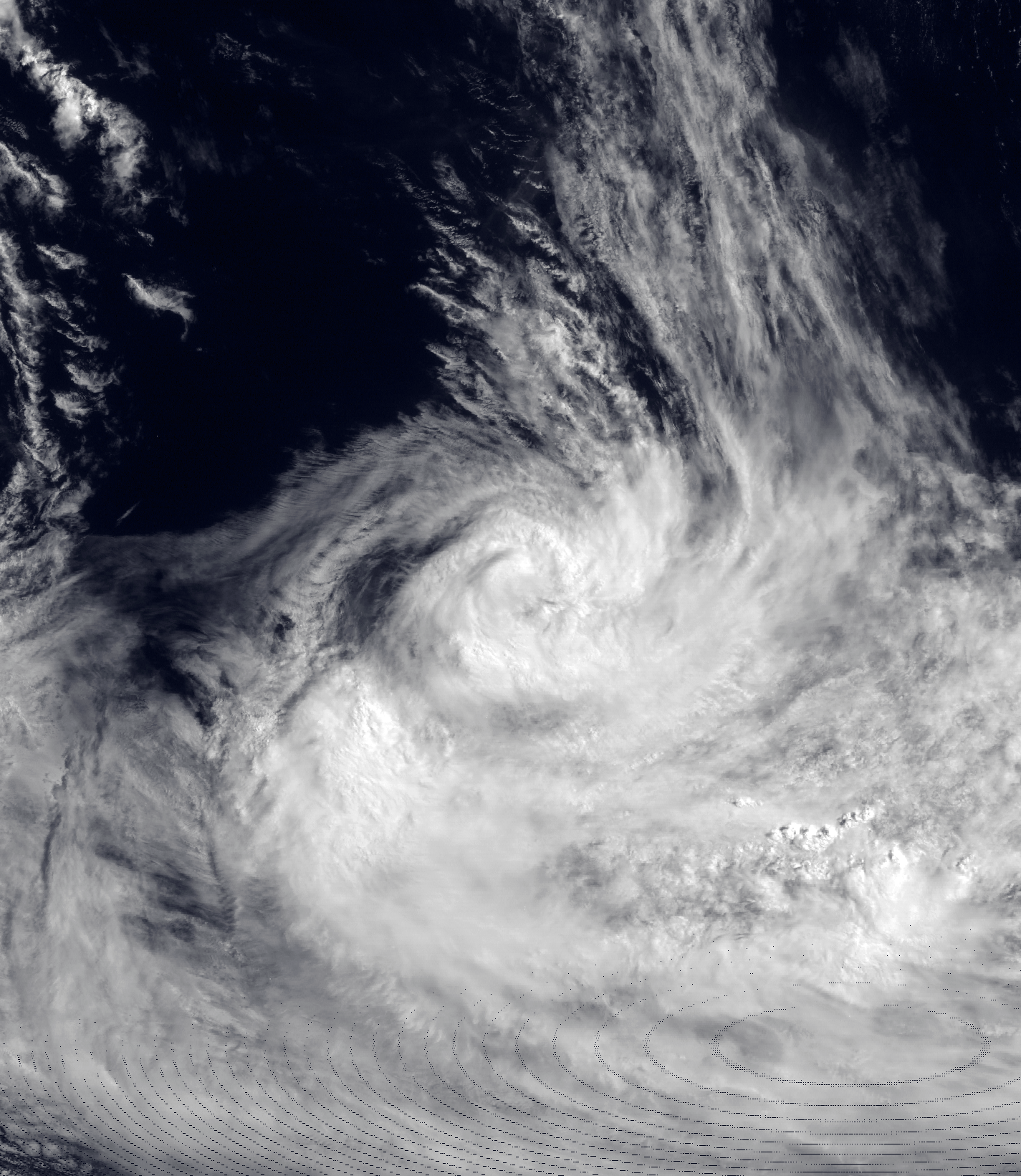
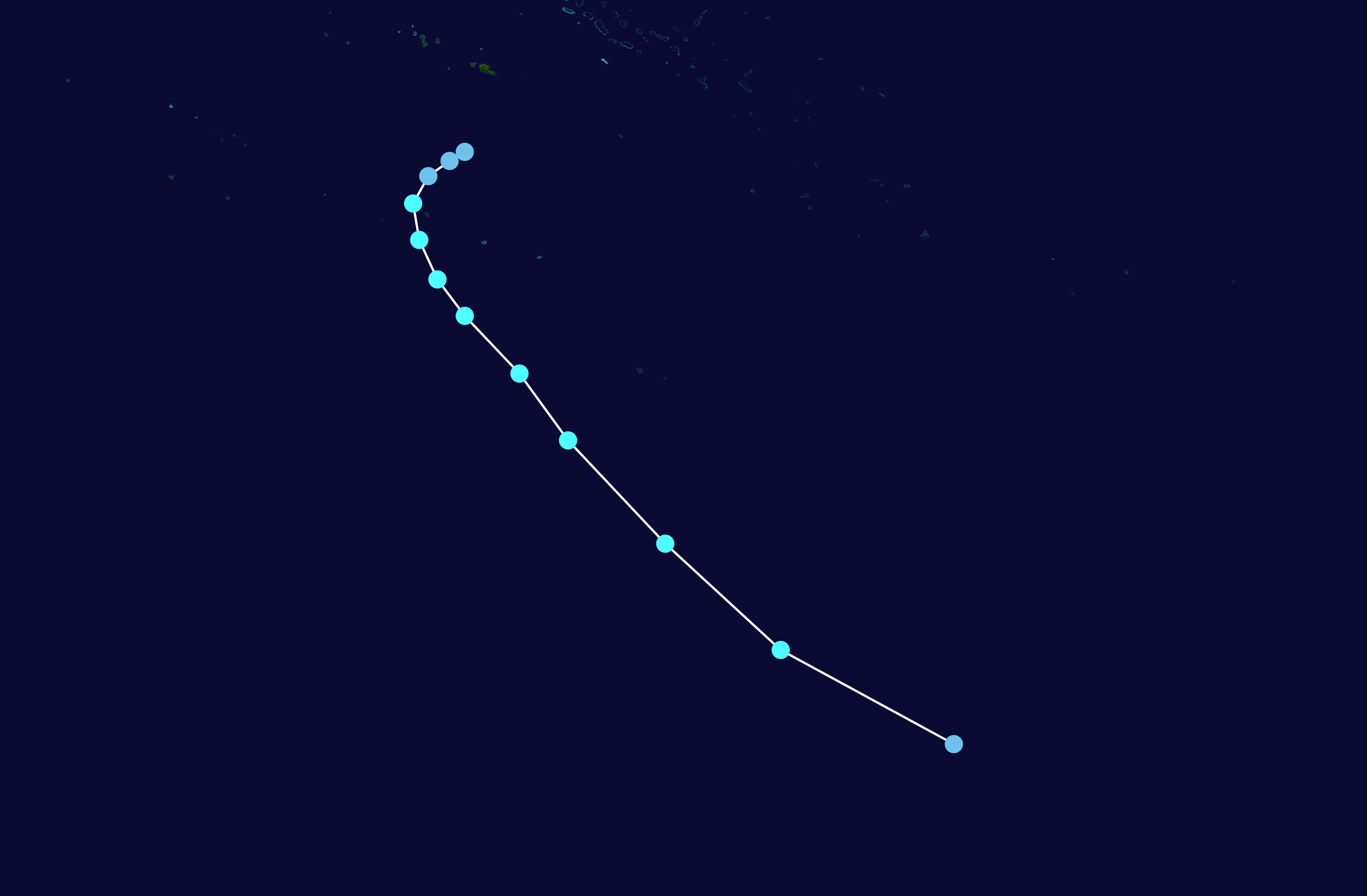
- Duration: December 21 – December 24
- Peak intensity: 65 km/h (40 mph) (10-min); 997 hPa (mbar)

=== Severe Tropical Cyclone Cora ===
- Category 3 severe tropical cyclone (Australian scale)
- Category 2 tropical cyclone (SSHWS)
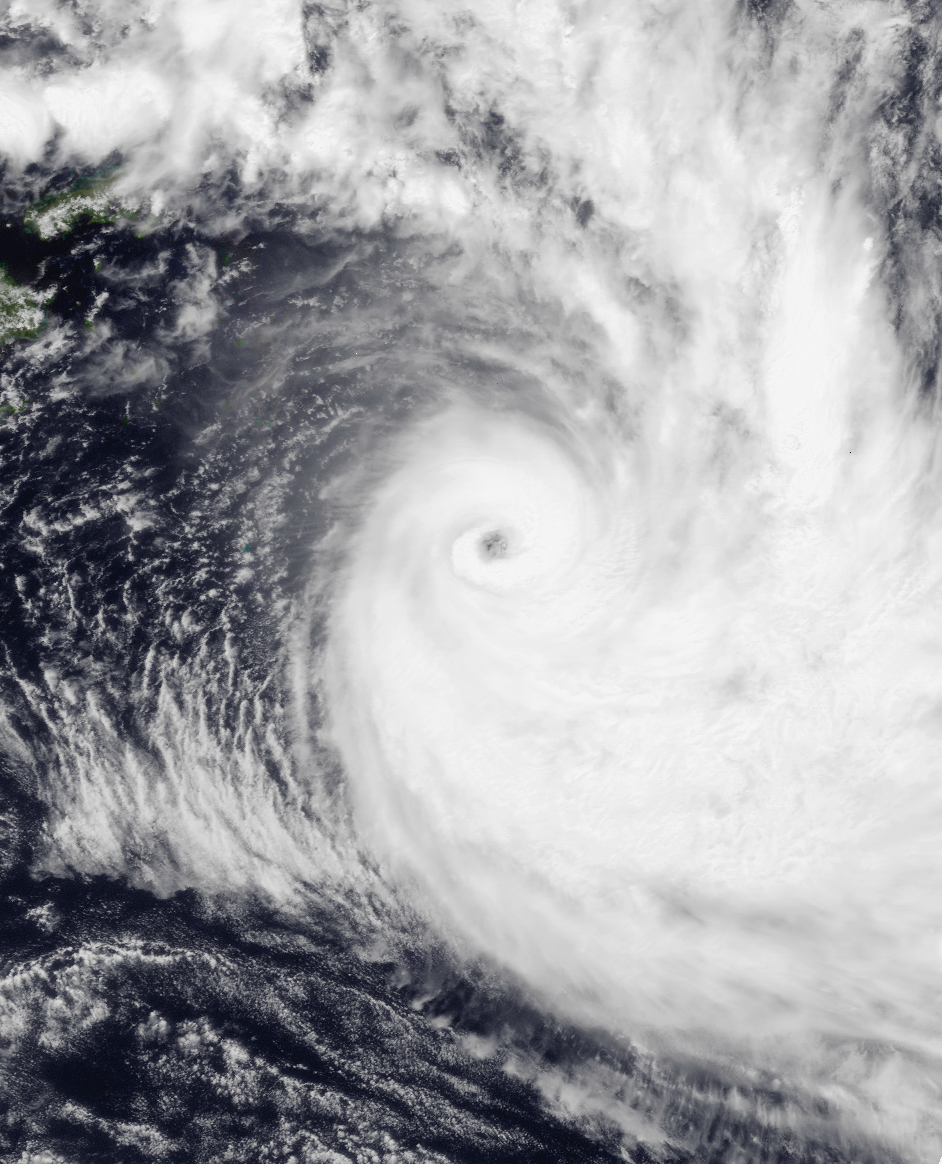
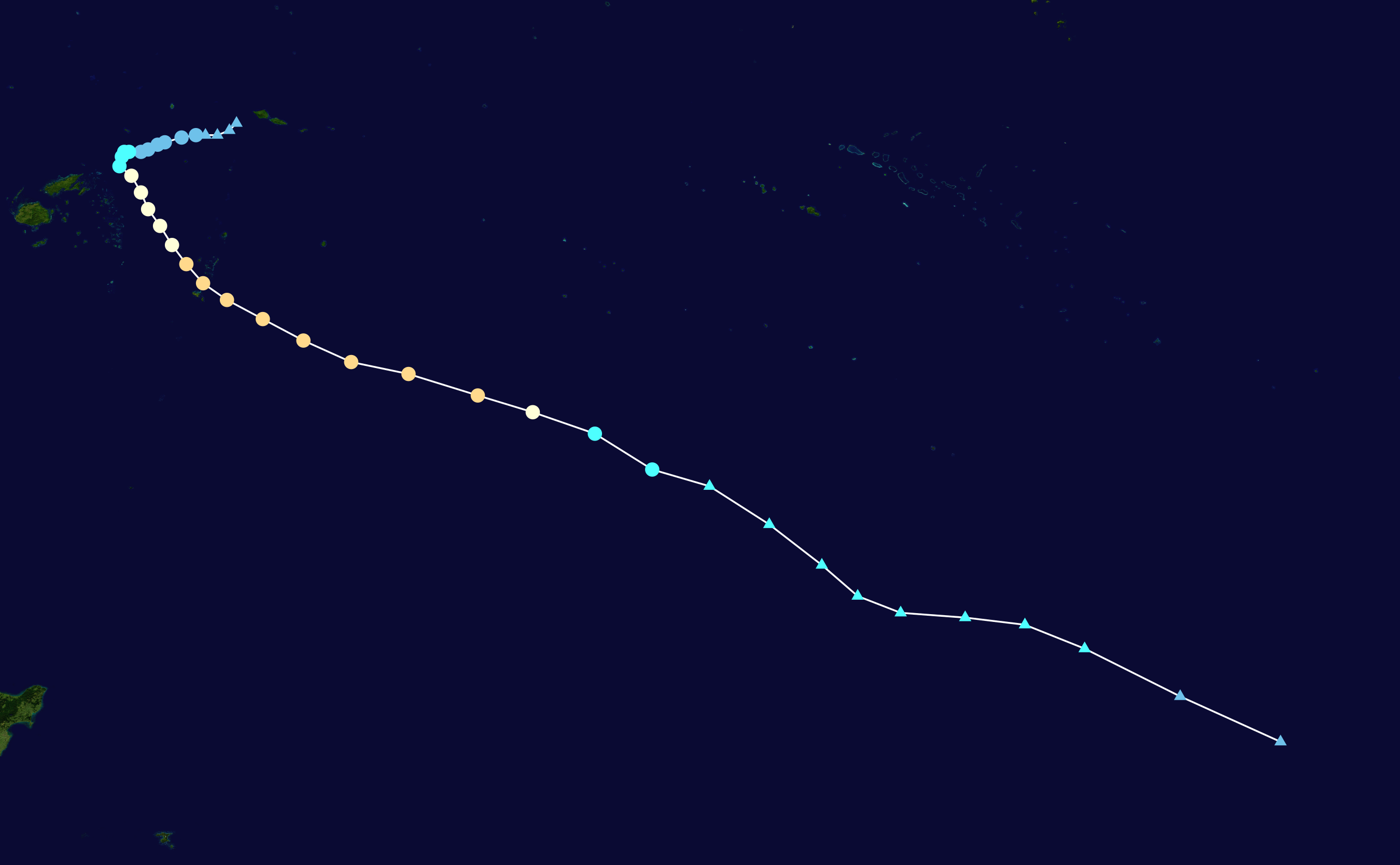
- Duration: December 23 – December 28
- Peak intensity: 140 km/h (85 mph) (10-min); 960 hPa (mbar)

Tropical Cyclone Cora struck Tonga on 26 December 1998. Winds were measured at 160 km/h. The winds caused extensive damage to crops and food sources, and the storm generally caused damage to hundreds of buildings and Tongan infrastructure including the Foa Causeway in Ha'apai, the Ha'apai water system, and electricity networks, with systems partially or totally shut down.

Ha'apai and Vavaʻu had been experiencing drought when Cora impacted them.

=== Severe Tropical Cyclone Dani ===
- Category 4 severe tropical cyclone (Australian scale)
- Category 4 tropical cyclone (SSHWS)
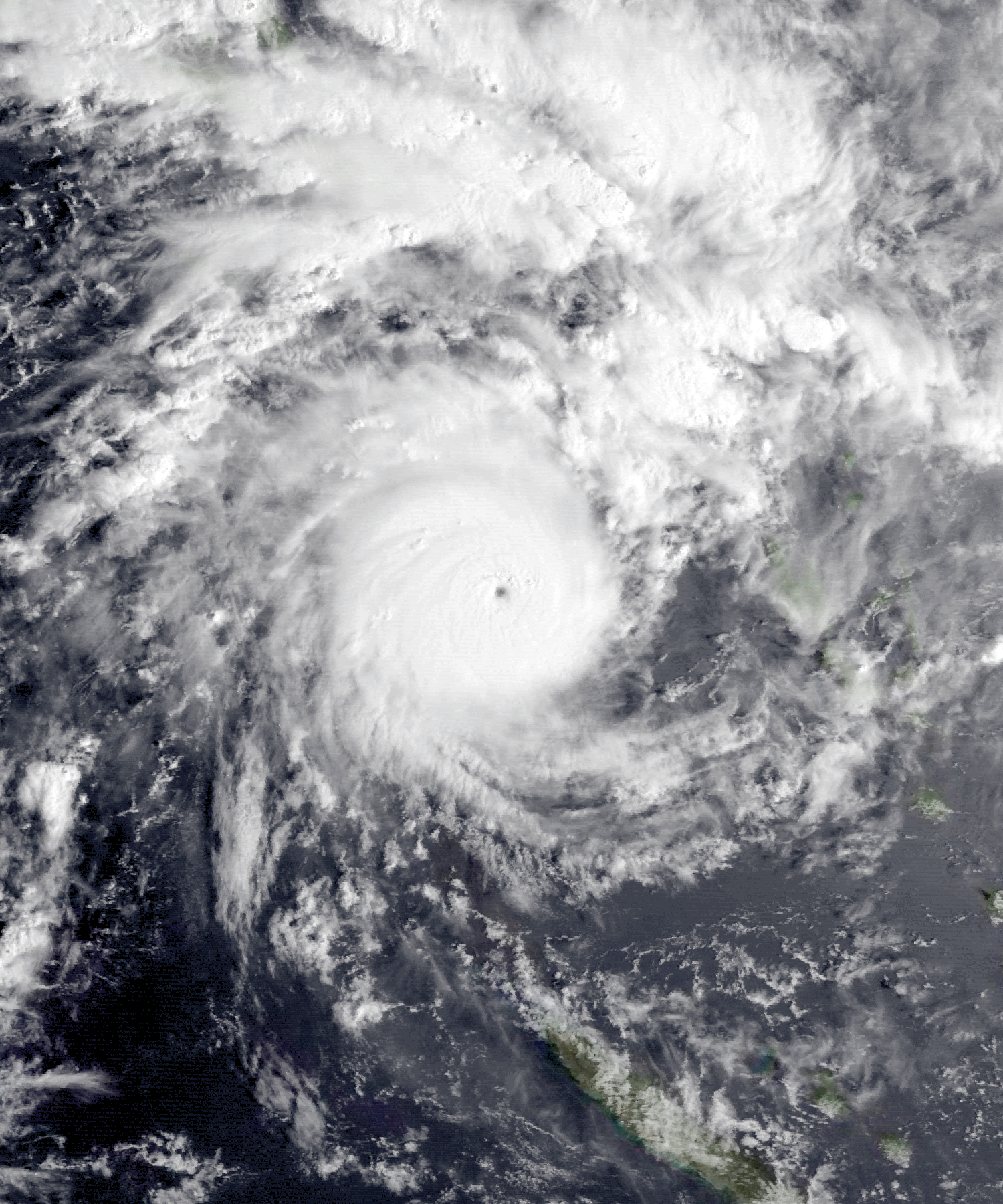
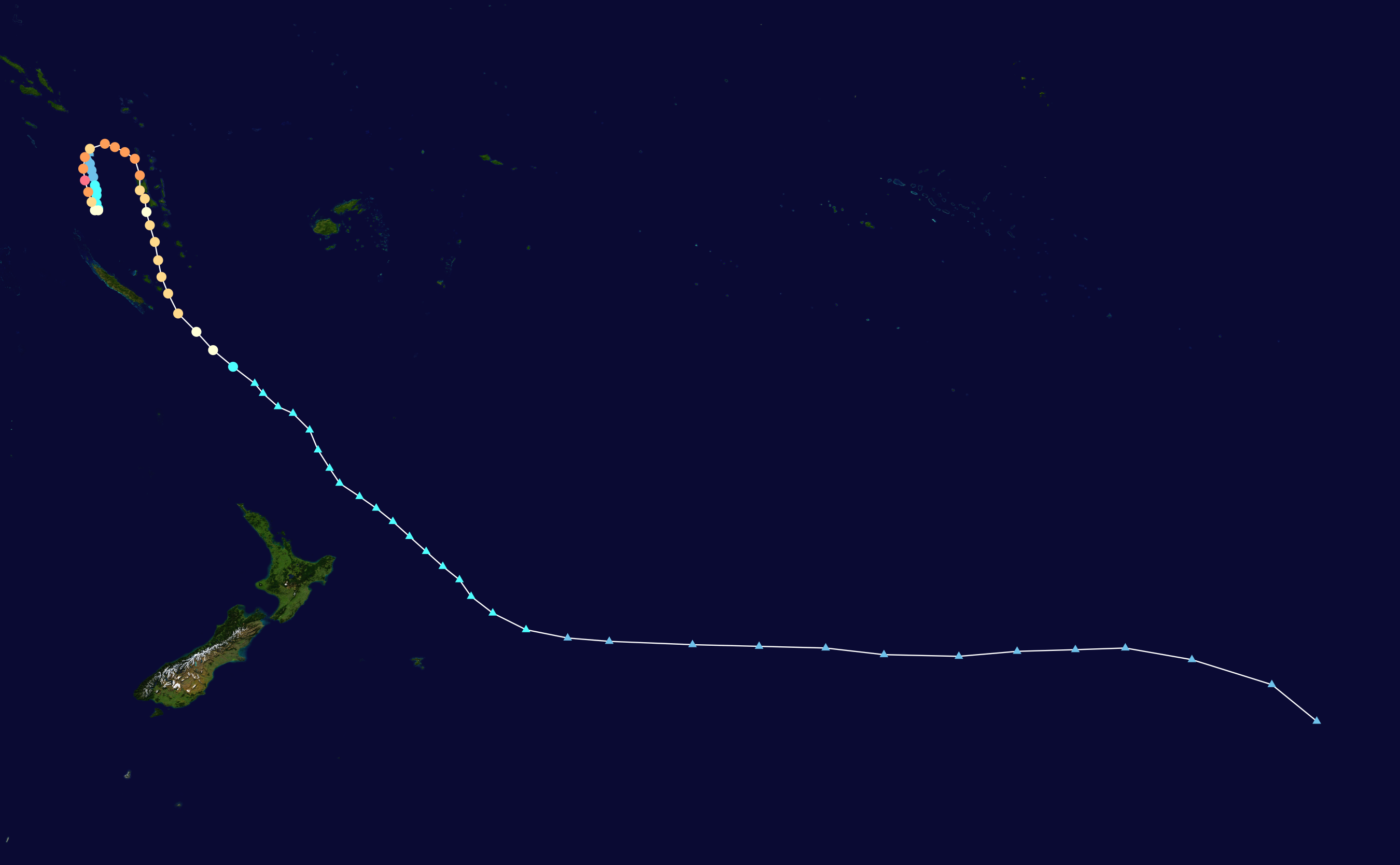
- Duration: January 15 – January 22
- Peak intensity: 185 km/h (115 mph) (10-min); 925 hPa (mbar)

Although Dani never threatened to strike Fiji, its outer bands brought catastrophic rainfall to the nation, killing 12 people and leaving US$3.5 million in damage behind. Damage in Vanuatu was estimated at 1 billion Vatu (US$8.5 million).

=== Tropical Cyclone Olinda ===
- Category 2 tropical cyclone (Australian scale)
- Tropical storm (SSHWS)
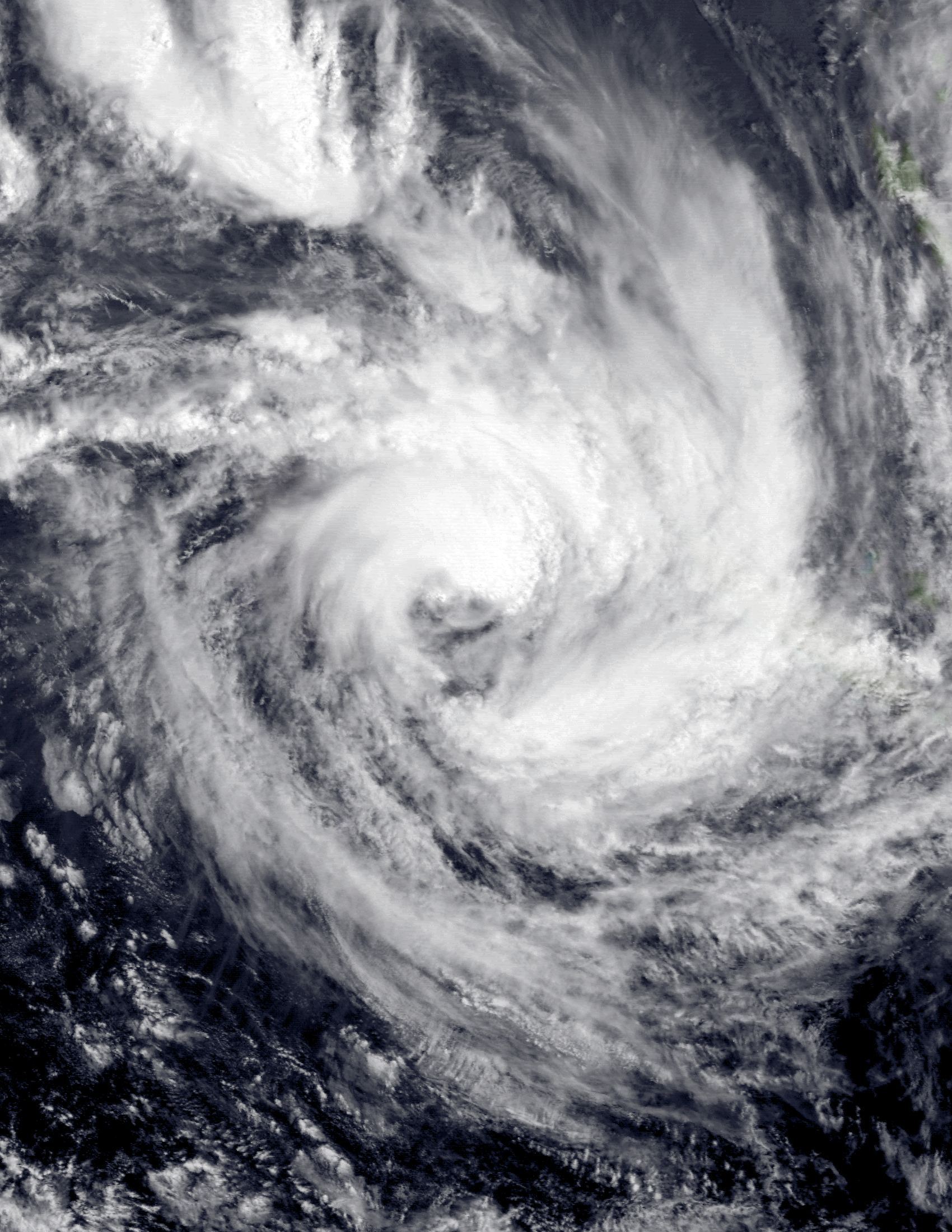
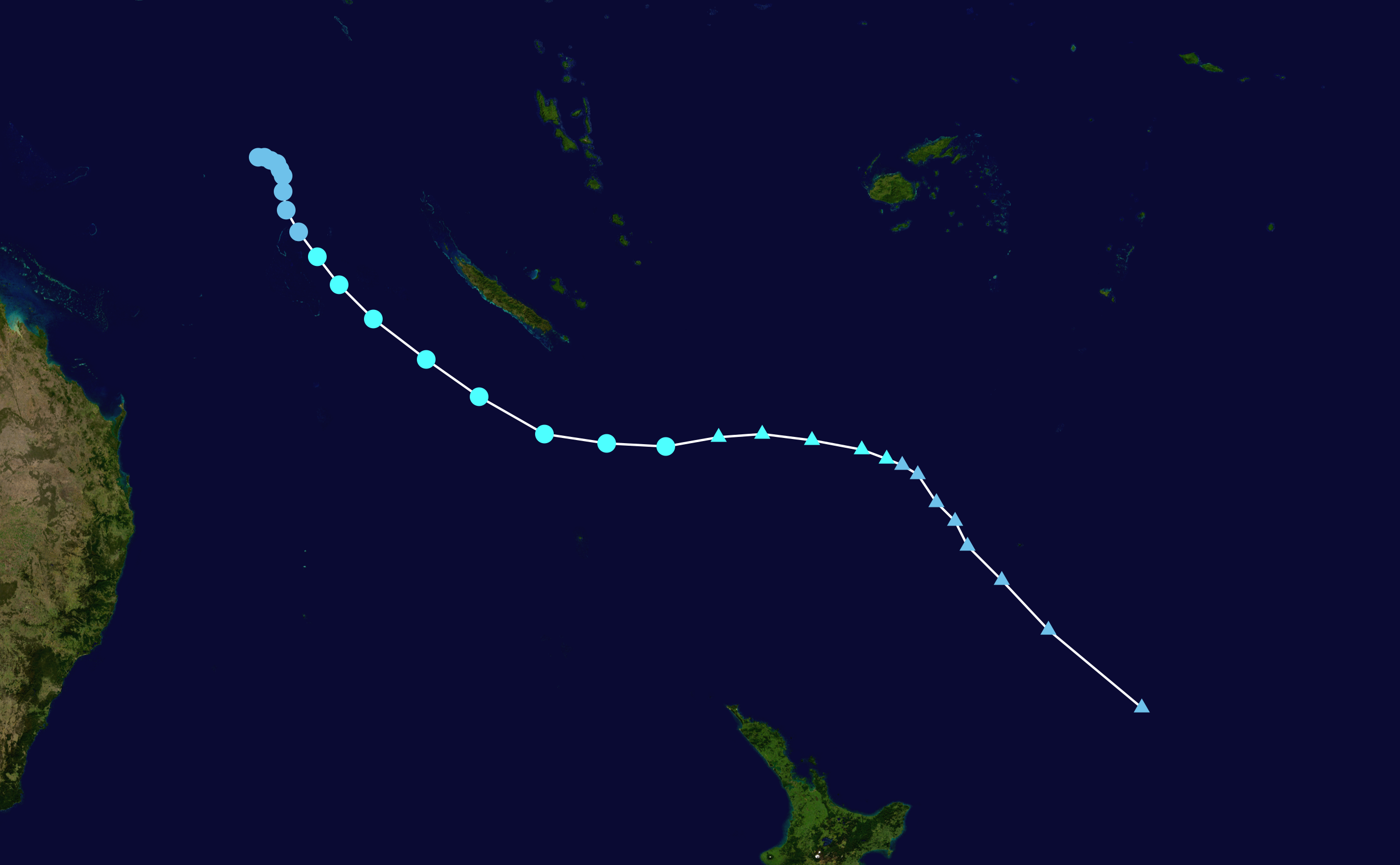
- Duration: January 22 (Entered basin) – January 23
- Peak intensity: 100 km/h (65 mph) (10-min); 985 hPa (mbar)

On January 22, Tropical Cyclone Olinda moved into the basin about 740 km (460 mi) to the west-northwest of Nouméa, New Caledonia, with 10-minute sustained windspeeds of 85 km/h (55 mph) which made it a category 1 tropical cyclone on the Australian scale. During that day, the cyclone quickly moved towards the east-southeast quickly and managed to intensify into a category two tropical cyclone before it moved into TCWC Wellington's area of responsibility.

=== Tropical Cyclone Pete ===
- Category 2 tropical cyclone (Australian scale)
- Tropical storm (SSHWS)
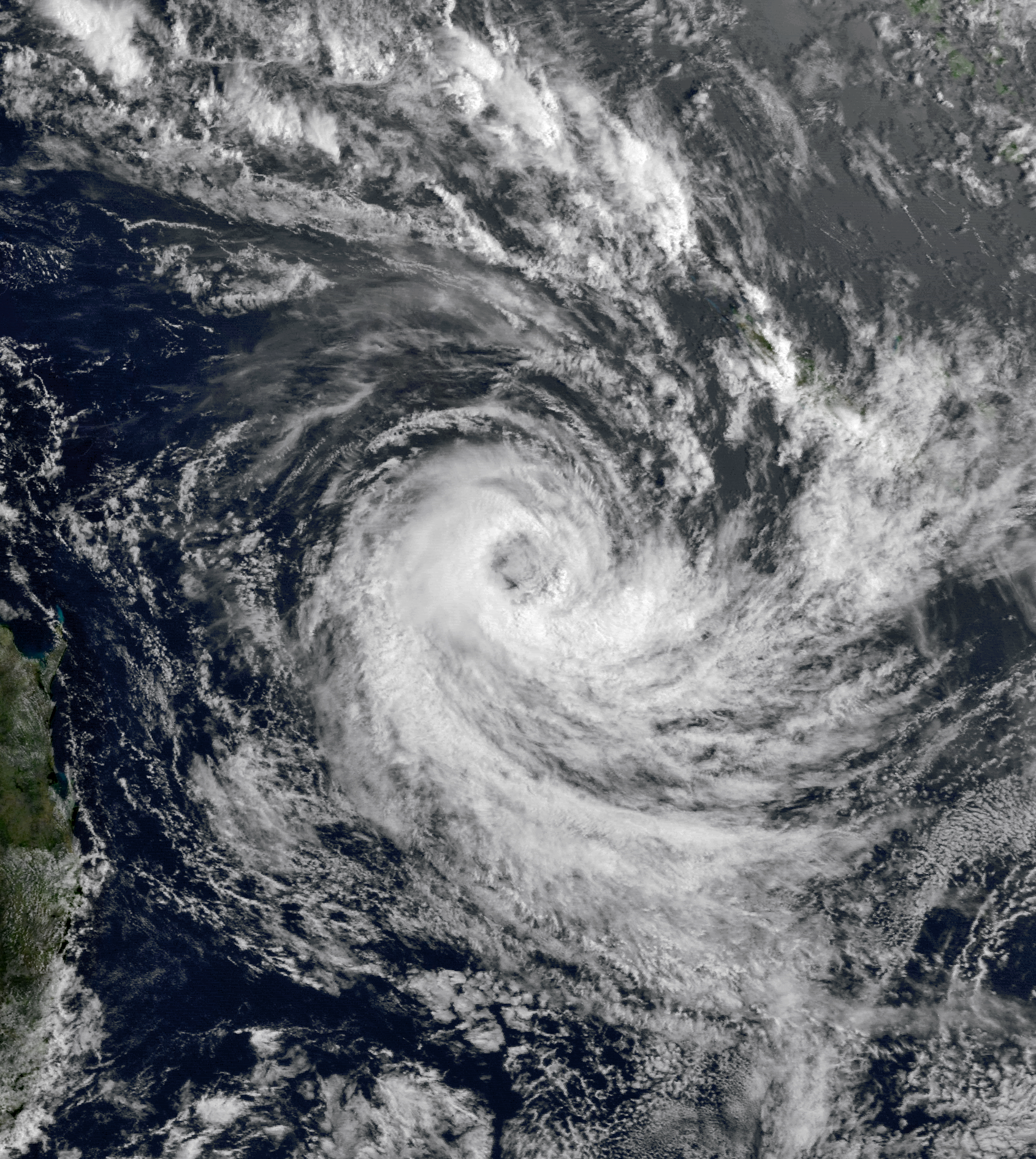
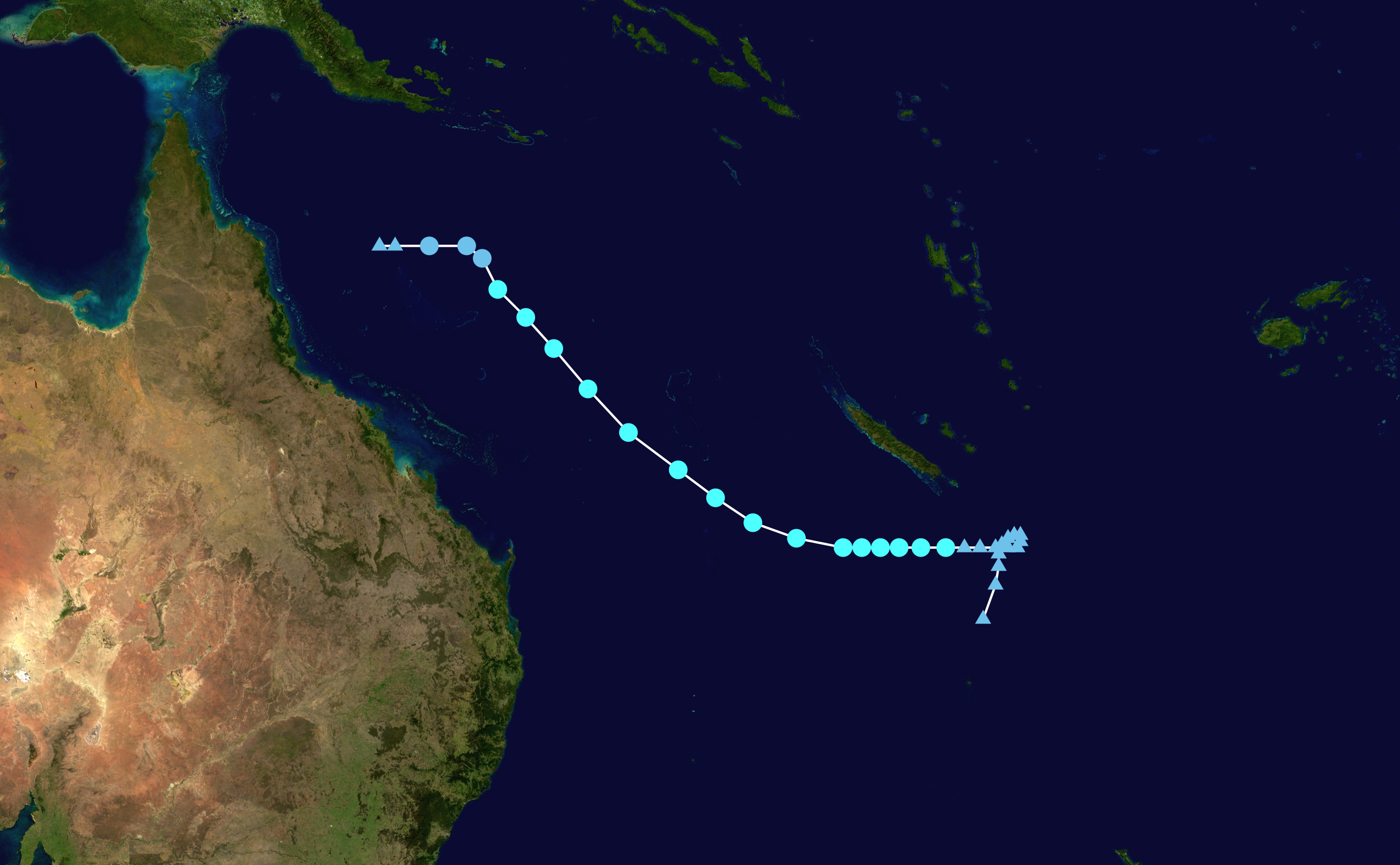
- Duration: January 23 (Entered basin) – January 26
- Peak intensity: 100 km/h (65 mph) (10-min); 985 hPa (mbar)

On January 23, Tropical Cyclone Pete moved into the South Pacific basin, while at its 1-minute and 10-minute peak intensities of 95 km/h (60 mph) and 100 km/h (60 mph), which made it a tropical storm or a weak category two tropical cyclone on the Australian Scale.

=== Tropical Cyclone Ella ===
- Category 1 tropical cyclone (Australian scale)
- Tropical storm (SSHWS)
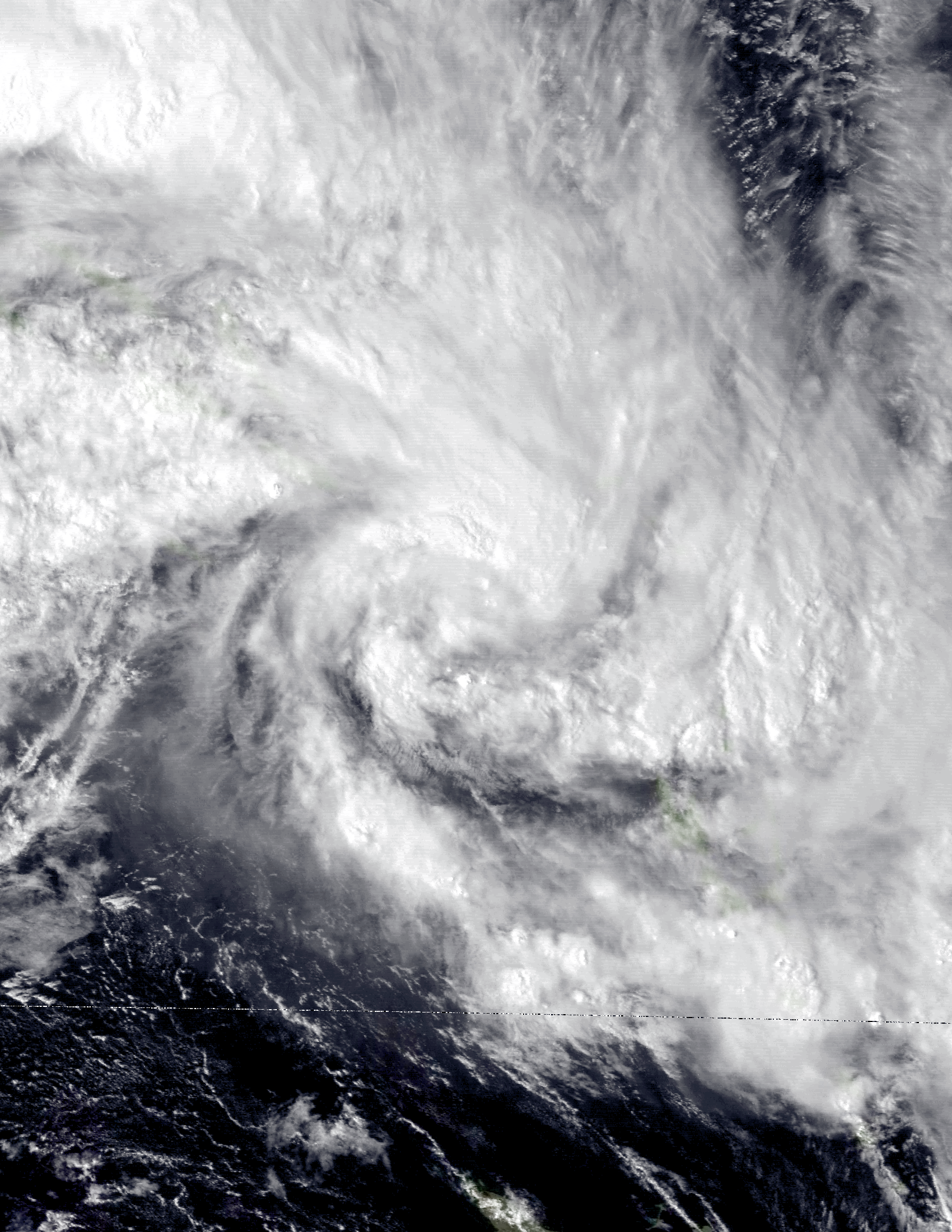
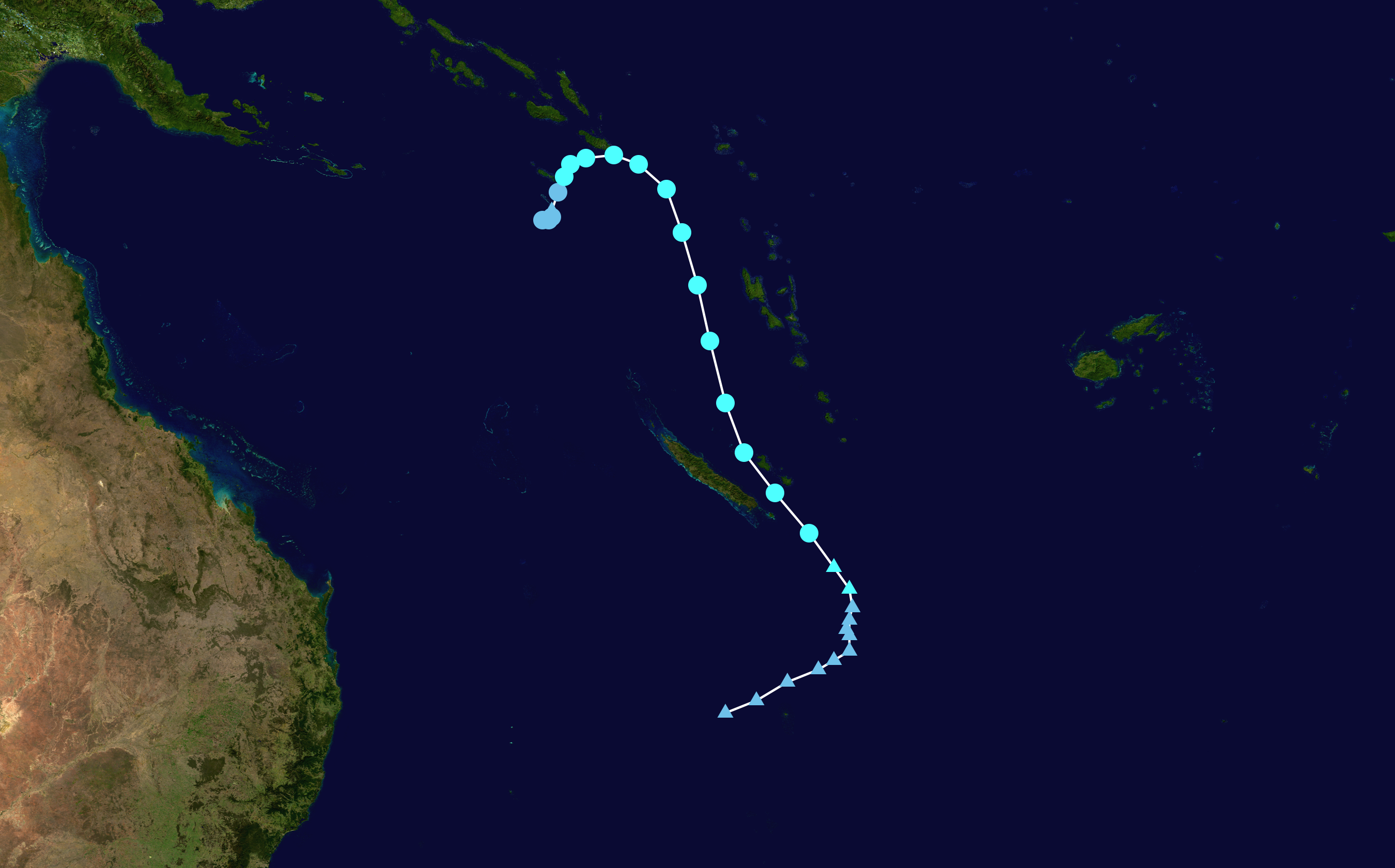
- Duration: February 9 – February 13
- Peak intensity: 85 km/h (50 mph) (10-min); 985 hPa (mbar)

On February 9, the FMS reported that a tropical depression had developed within a monsoon trough, about 210 kilometres (130 mi) to the south of Honaira on the Solomon Island: Guadalcanal. During that day the depression moved towards the east and gradually intensified, as convection started to organise while vertical windshear over the system decreased, before the JTWC initiated advisories and designated the depression as Tropical Cyclone 19P. During February 10, 19P started to move towards the southeast while developing further before the FMS named the depression as Ella early the next day, before it turned and accelerated towards the south and passed about 160 km (100 mi) to the west of the northern tip Espiritu Santo.

=== Severe Tropical Cyclone Frank ===
- Category 3 severe tropical cyclone (Australian scale)
- Category 2 tropical cyclone (SSHWS)
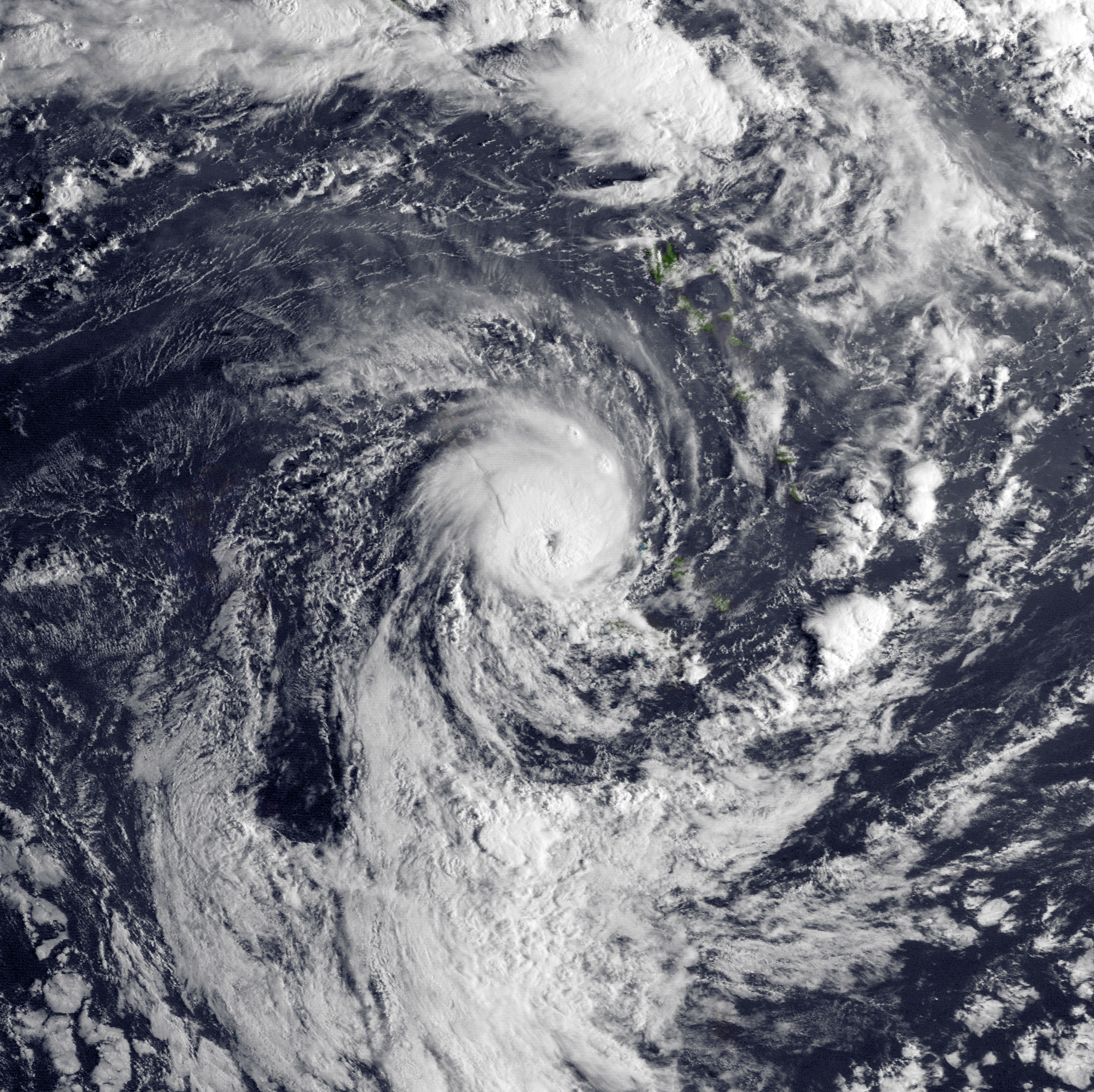
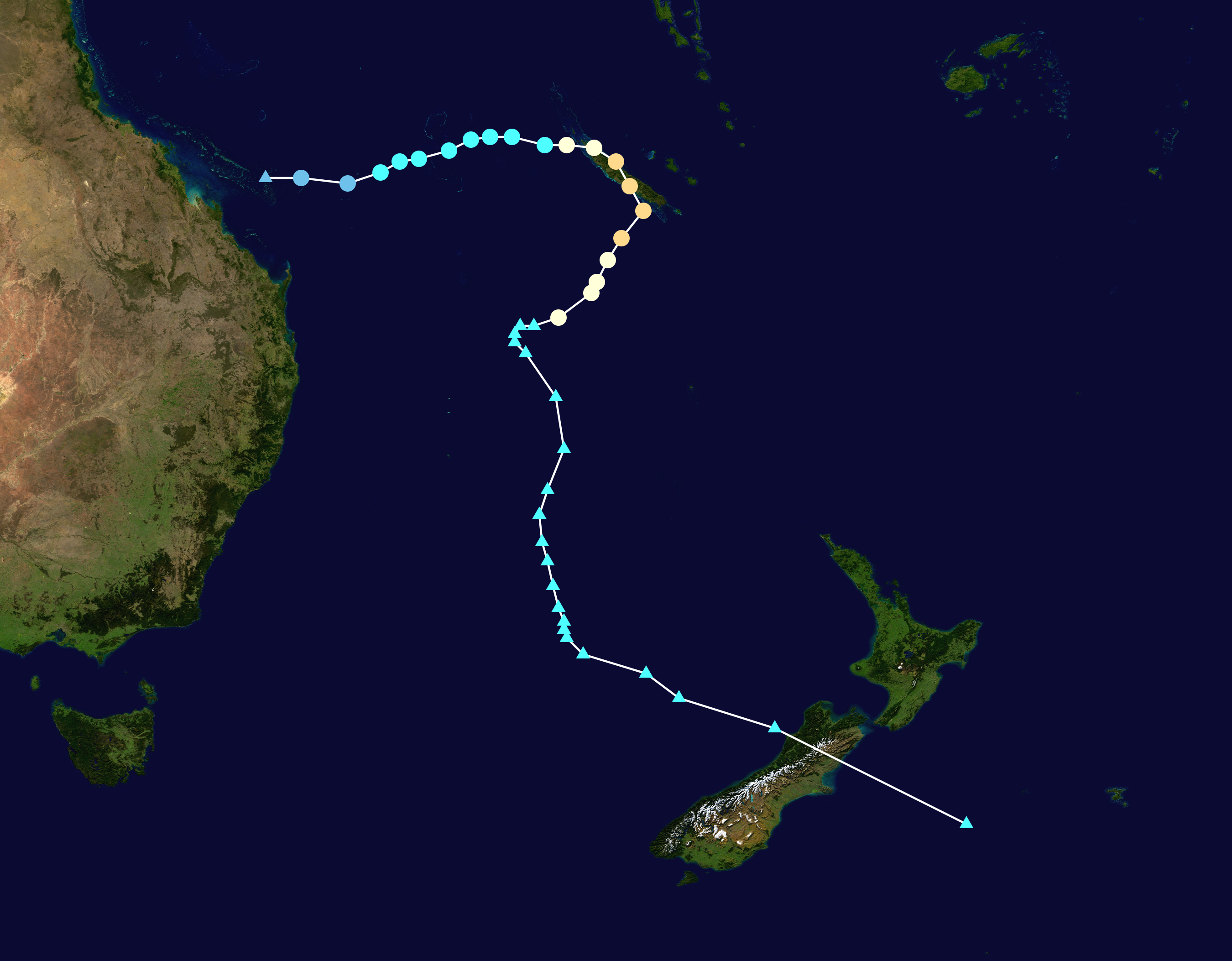
- Duration: February 16 – February 21
- Peak intensity: 150 km/h (90 mph) (10-min); 955 hPa (mbar)

This storm regenerated from Rona.

=== Tropical Depression 17F ===
- Tropical depression (Australian scale)
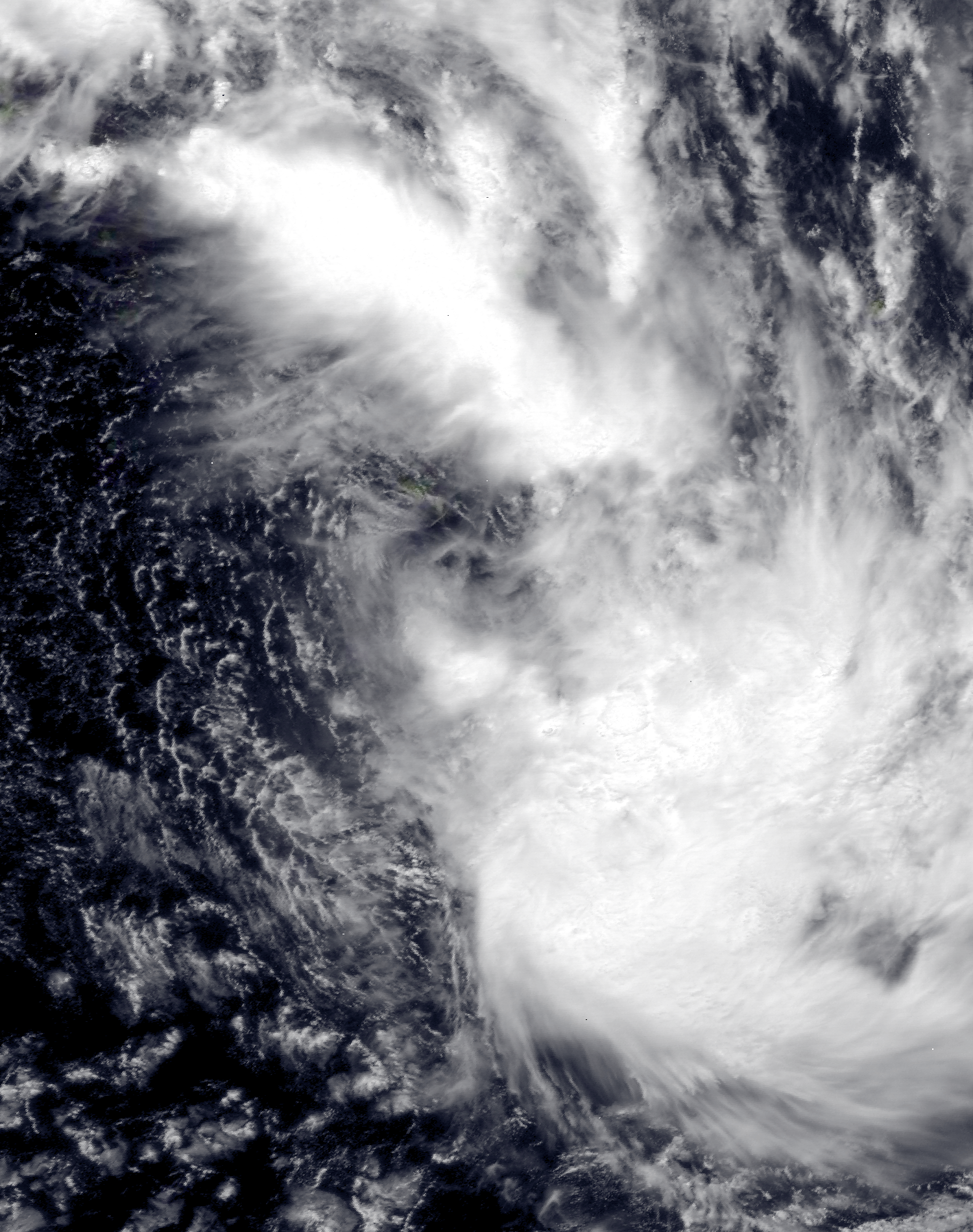
- Duration: February 17 – February 19
- Peak intensity: 75 km/h (45 mph) (10-min); 995 hPa (mbar)

On February 17, the FMS reported that a weak tropical depression, had developed within a monsoon trough over the southern Fijian islands. During that day, the depression moved slowly towards the east before it started to turn towards the southeast during the next day while convection started to organize further. Later that day, the FMS issued a marine weather bulletin, warning that the depression had 10-minute sustained windspeeds of 75 km/h (45 mph). However, the depression was not classified as a tropical cyclone as the gale-force windspeeds were only present in the southern semicircle because of a pressure gradient with a surface ridge of high pressure to the south of the system. (Note: Within the Australian and Southern Pacific basins: A tropical depression must have gale-force winds completely surrounding the centre before the system is classified as a tropical cyclone.) Over the next couple of days the depression moved towards the southeast before it was last noted by the FMS, during February 19 as it approached MetService's area of responsibility.

=== Tropical Cyclone Gita ===
- Category 1 tropical cyclone (Australian scale)
- Tropical storm (SSHWS)
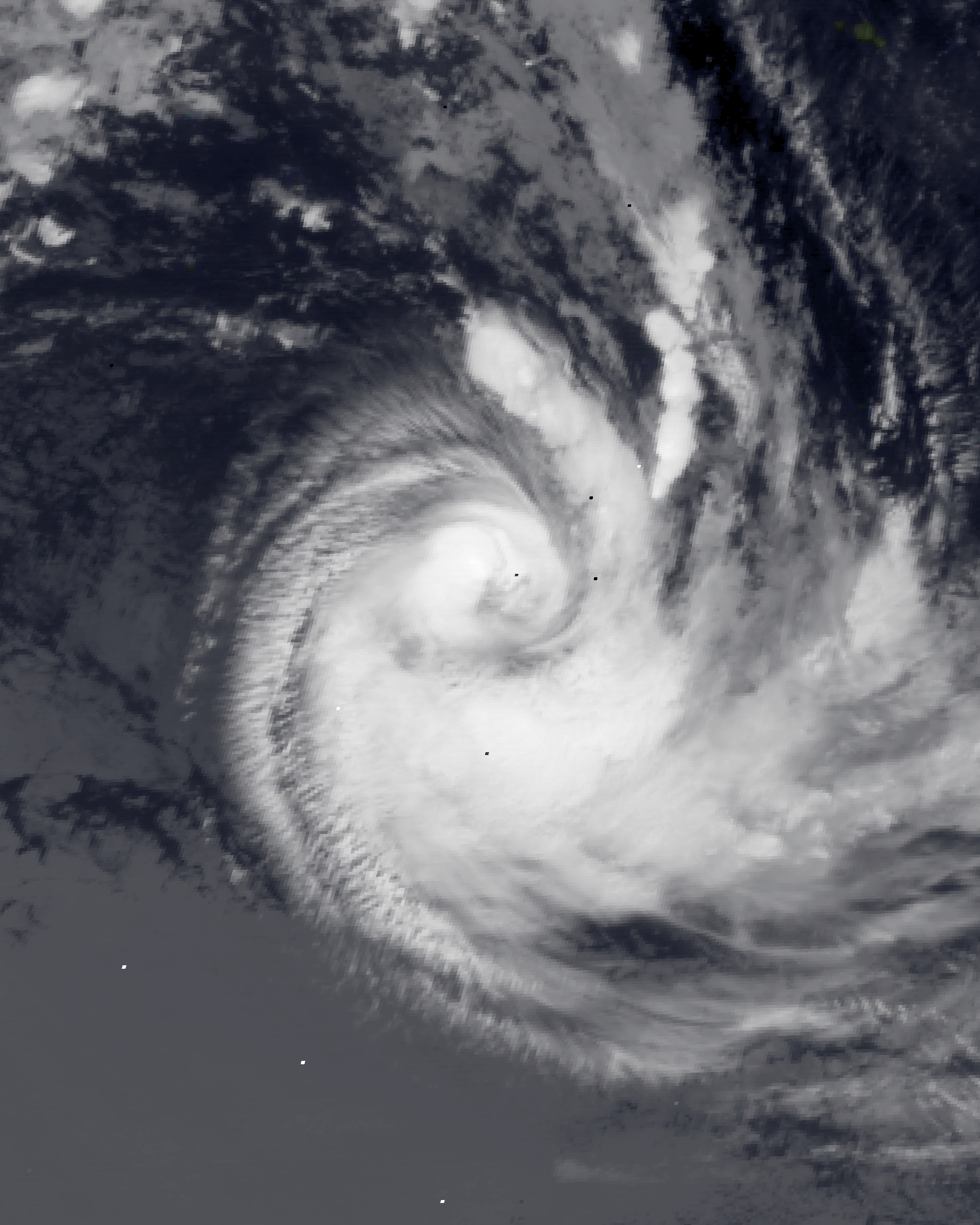
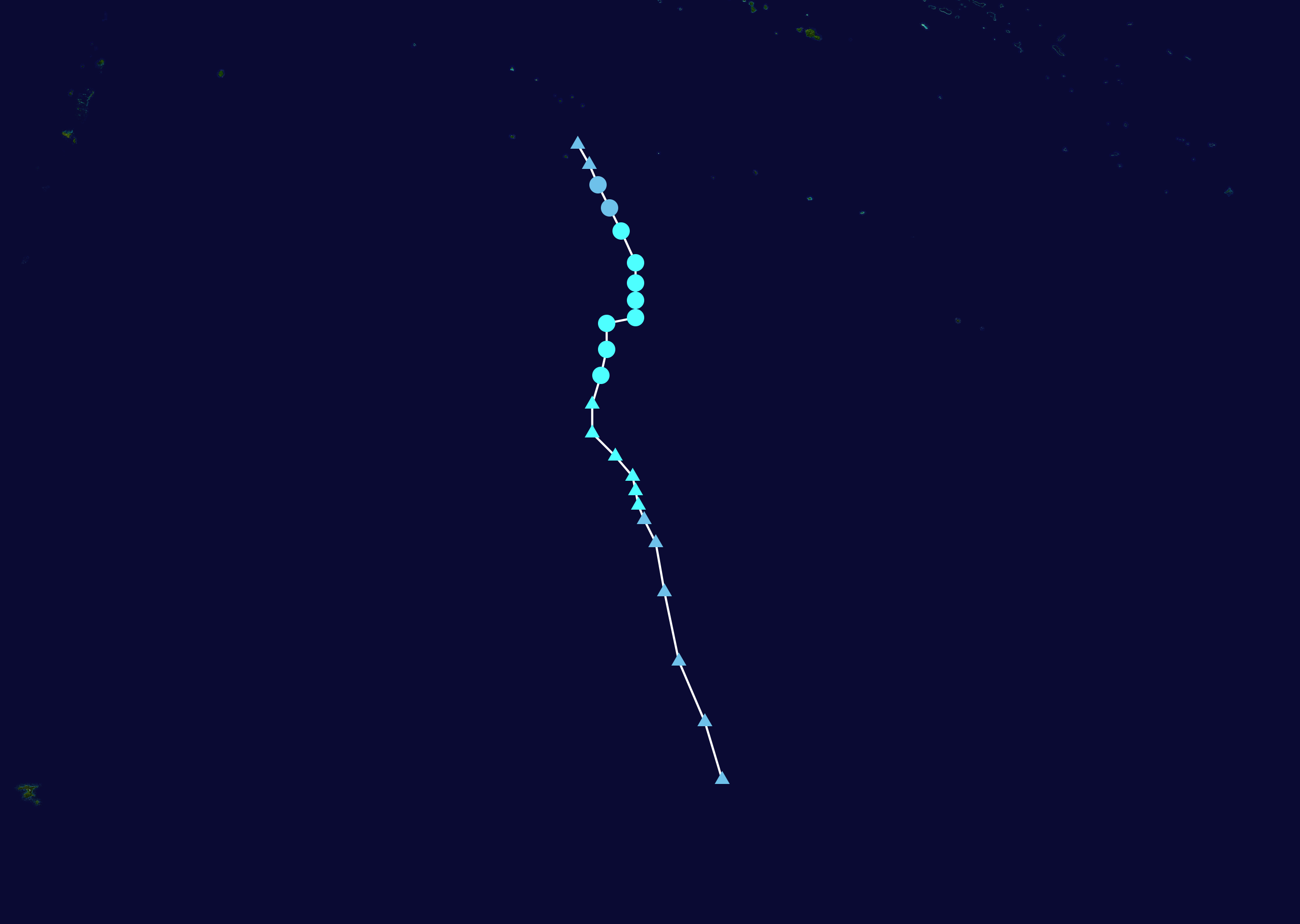
- Duration: February 25 – February 28
- Peak intensity: 85 km/h (50 mph) (10-min); 990 hPa (mbar)

On February 25, the FMS started to monitor a weak shallow depression that had developed within the South Pacific Convergence Zone just to the north of the Southern Cooks Islands. Over the next two days the depression gradually developed further, before the system moved out of the FMS's area of responsibility during February 27 as it developed into a category one tropical cyclone. TCWC Wellington, in conjunction with the FMS, subsequently named it Gita.

=== Severe Tropical Cyclone Hali ===
- Category 3 severe tropical cyclone (Australian scale)
- Tropical storm (SSHWS)
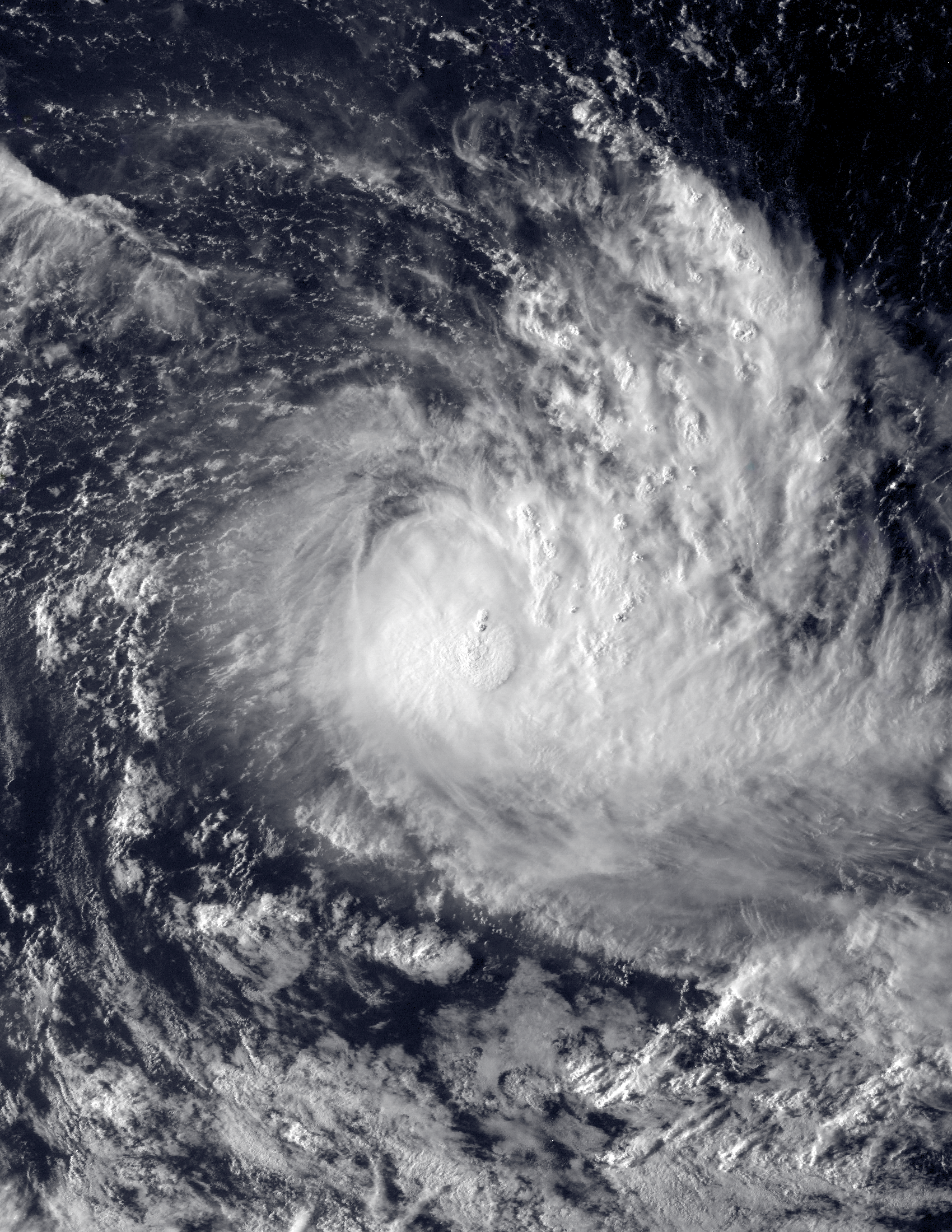
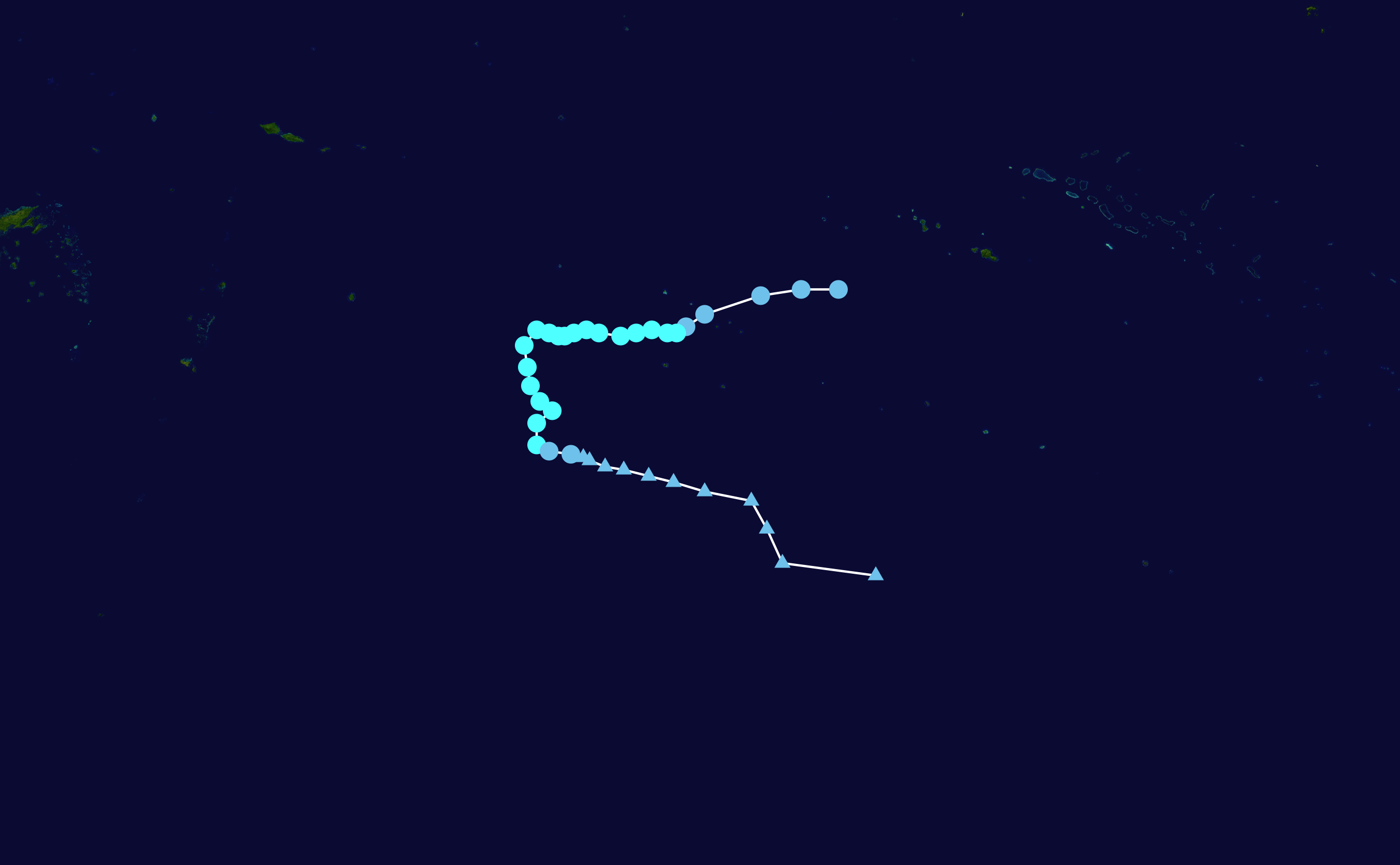
- Duration: March 11 – March 18
- Peak intensity: 120 km/h (75 mph) (10-min); 970 hPa (mbar)

Early on March 11, the NPMOC and the FMS started to monitor a tropical disturbance that had developed within the South Pacific Convergence Zone between the Southern Cook Islands and French Polynesia. Later that day as the disturbance moved towards the southwest, the FMS reported that it had developed into a tropical depression while located about 485 km (300 mi) to the east of the Cook Island: Aitutaki. Under the influence of diurnal effects and significant vertical shear the depression slowly developed over the next couple of days while drifting through the southern Cook Islands. By 1800 UTC on January 12, the depressions low level circulation centre had moved under the deep convection, as result the FMS then reported that the system had developed into a tropical cyclone and named it Hali. At the same time the NPMOC initiated advisories on Hali and designated it as Tropical Cyclone 27P, while it was equivalent to a tropical storm with 1-minute sustained windspeeds of 65 km/h (40 mph). After it was named Hali moved towards the west, before early on January 13, the NPMOC reported that Hali had reached its 1-minute peak intensity of 95 km/h (60 mph).

Over the next 3 days, Hali moved towards the west as it gradually intensified further, before early on March 16, an approaching upper trough of low pressure caused a weakness in the subtropical ridge. As a result, the cyclone started to move towards the south, while the FMS reported that Hali had reached its 10-minute peak windspeeds of 120 km/h (75 mph), which made it a category 3 severe tropical cyclone on the Australian scale. Later that day the FMS reported that the cyclone had started to rapidly weaken because of increasing vertical windshear and cooler sea surface temperatures, and interference from Tropical Depression 20F. As a result, the FMS reported at 1200 UTC on January 18, that Hali had weakened into a depression before later that day the cyclone got caught up in the low level steering field and drifted into TCWC Wellington's area of responsibility during the next day. The remnants of Hali were then last noted during March 20, as they dissipated about 1,200 km (745 mi) to the southeast of Avarua on the Southern Cook Island: Rarotonga.

=== Tropical Depression 20F ===
- Tropical depression (Australian scale)
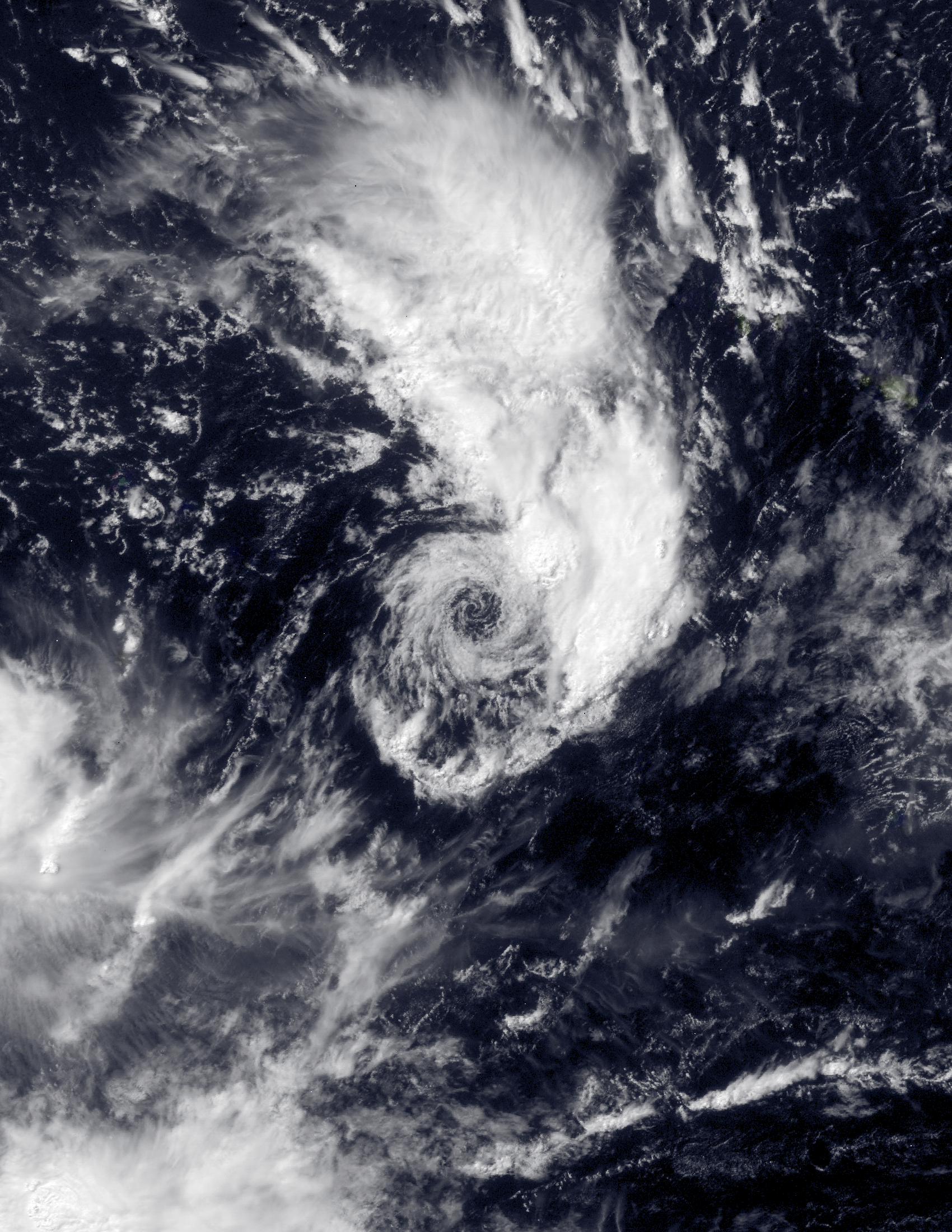
- Duration: March 13 – March 18
- Peak intensity: 65 km/h (40 mph) (10-min); 998 hPa (mbar)

On March 13, the FMS reported that Tropical Disturbance 20F had developed about 800 km (495 mi) to the northeast of Papeete, French Polynesia. The disturbance was located in an upper-level environment that was not favorable for further development, and deep convection surrounding the system was limited to the northern quadrant. Over the next couple of days the disturbance moved towards the west-southwest and was classified as a tropical depression early on March 15, while it was located about 160 km (100 mi) to the northwest of Tahiti. The depression then developed gale-force winds of 65 km/h (40 mph) during the next day, however, because they were only found in one or two quadrants and did not wrap around the depression's exposed center, it was not considered to be a tropical cyclone. The depressions center was also exposed and displaced to the southwest of the deep convection at this time. The depression was then last noted later that day as it moved into MetService's area of responsibility, about 400 km (250 mi) to the southeast of Avarua in the Southern Cook Islands.

=== Other systems ===
The following weak tropical disturbances were also monitored by the FMS, however all of these systems were either short lived or did not develop significantly. The first, Tropical Disturbance 01F, developed about 540 km (340 mi) to the northwest of Apia in American Samoa, however the system remained weak and was last noted later that day. On December 25, Tropical Disturbance 04F developed over the Coral Sea within an area of strong vertical windshear in the Australian region. During that day 04F moved towards the southeast and entered the South Pacific basin, before dissipating during December 26. Tropical Depression 05F then developed on January 1 to the north of the Southern Cook Islands, while showing some baroclinic characteristics, before developing a fair amount of convection around the centre. Convection surrounding the system decreased during January 3, before the system had become unclassifiable by January 5. Tropical Disturbance 06F formed on January 3, to the southwest of French Polynesia, in an area of strong vertical windshear. Over the next couple of days the disturbance moved towards the southwest and never showed any signs of organising significantly. Tropical Low/Disturbance 08F developed on January 16, within an active convergence zone, that was located to the east of Fiji. Over the next couple of days convection around the centre increased slightly but vertical windshear restrained 08F from developing significantly, before on January 19 it moved into much cooler waters and stronger vertical windshear which ultimately led its demise. Along with Cyclone Dani, 08F extended a trough of low pressure on to Fiji which caused significant flooding, 6 deaths and about 4 million (1999 FJD) worth of damage.

Tropical Disturbances 11F, 12F, 13F and 15F were all weak tropical disturbances, that occurred during the first half of February. On March 28, the FMS reported that Tropical Disturbance 21F had developed about 335 km (210 mi) to the northeast of Niue. During the day the disturbance remained weak as it moved towards the south, however the disturbance did not develop any further as it was located in an unfavourable environment for further development. The basin then was quiet, until April 9 when Tropical Disturbance 22F developed in the eastern portion of the Australian region within an area of high vertical windshear, and slowly moved south-eastwards into the basin without developing further. The next disturbance then developed within the South Pacific Convergence Zone on April 21, to the southeast of Tonga. As the system moved towards the southeast, further development was inhibited by strong north-westerly winds and it quickly became extratropical. As an extratropical cyclone 23F generated significant damaging swells that affected most countries within the Southern Pacific for about a week. Tropical Depression 26F developed about 770 km (480 mi) to the east of Port Villa, Vanuatu, ahead of an approaching trough of low pressure, while deep convection lied to the southeast of the low level circulation centre. Over the next few days, the system moved generally southwards slowly, before on May 25, it turned and started accelerating towards New Zealand. On May 27, the remnants of Tropical Depression 26F were absorbed by a large polar low, that was located to the south of the remnants.

== Season effects ==
| Name | Dates | Peak intensity | | | Areas affected | Damage (USD) | Deaths | Ref(s). |
| Name | Dates | Category | Wind speed | Pressure | Areas affected | Damage (USD) | Deaths | Ref(s). |
|---|---|---|---|---|---|---|---|---|
| 01F | December 4 | Tropical disturbance | Not specified | Not specified | None | None | None | |
| 07P | December 14–17 | Tropical depression | 75 km/h (45 mph) | 999 hPa (29.50 inHg) | | | | |
| 02F/08P | December 22–24 | Tropical depression | Unknown | 997 hPa (29.44 inHg) | | | | |
| Cora | December 23–28 | Category 3 severe tropical cyclone | 140 km/h (85 mph) | Unknown | Tonga | 12 million | | |
| 04F | December 25–26 | Tropical disturbance | Unknown | Unknown | None | | | |
| 05F | January 1–5 | Tropical depression | Unknown | Unknown | None | | | |
| 06F | January 3 | Tropical disturbance | Unknown | Unknown | None | | | |
| Dani | January 15–22 | Category 4 severe tropical cyclone | 185 km/h (115 mph) | 935 hPa (27.61 inHg) | Vanuatu, New Caledonia, Fiji | | 2 | (Note: Severe Tropical Cyclone Dani and Tropical disturbance 08F extended a trough of low pressure on to Fiji which caused 6 deaths and 4 million (FJD) in damage.) |
| 08F | January 16–20 | Tropical disturbance | Unknown | Unknown | Fiji | | | |
| Olinda | January 20–23 | Category 2 tropical cyclone | 100 km/h (60 mph) | Unknown | None | | | |
| Pete | January 21–26 | Category 2 tropical cyclone | 95 km/h (60 mph) | 985 hPa | None | | | |
| 11F | February | Tropical disturbance | Unknown | Unknown | None | | | |
| 12F | February | Tropical disturbance | Unknown | Unknown | None | | | |
| 13F | February | Tropical disturbance | Unknown | Unknown | None | | | |
| Ella | February 11–13 | Category 1 tropical cyclone | 85 km/h (55 mph) | 985 hPa (29.09 inHg) | Solomon Islands, Vanuatu, New Caledonia | | | |
| 15F | February | Tropical disturbance | Unknown | Unknown | None | | | |
| Frank | February 16–21 | Category 3 severe tropical cyclone | | | | | | |
| 17F | February 17–19 | Tropical depression | 75 km/h (45 mph) | 995 hPa (29.38 inHg) | None | | | |
| Gita | February 27 – March 2 | Category 1 tropical cyclone | 85 km/h (55 mph) | 990 hPa (29.23 inHg) | None | None | None | |
| Hali | March 11–18 | Category 3 severe tropical cyclone | 120 km/h (75 mph) | 970 hPa (28.64 inHg) | Cook Islands | None | None | |
| 20F | March 13–18 | Tropical depression | 65 km/h (40 mph) | 998 hPa (29.47 inHg) | French Polynesia, Cook Islands | | | |
| 21F | March 28 | Tropical disturbance | Unknown | Unknown | None | | | |
| 22F | April 9 | Tropical disturbance | Unknown | Unknown | None | | | |
| 23F | April 21 | Tropical disturbance | Unknown | Unknown | Several | | | |
| 24F | Unknown | Tropical disturbance | Unknown | Unknown | None | | | |
| 25F | Unknown | Tropical disturbance | Unknown | Unknown | None | | | |
| 26F | May 20–26 | Tropical depression | 75 km/h (45 mph) | 995 hPa (29.38 inHg) | Queensland, New Zealand | | | |
Season aggregates
| 27 systems | December 4 – May 26 | | 185 km/h (115 mph) | 935 hPa (27.61 inHg) | | | | |

== See also ==
- List of Southern Hemisphere tropical cyclone seasons
- Atlantic hurricane seasons: 1998, 1999
- Pacific hurricane seasons: 1998, 1999
- Pacific typhoon seasons: 1998, 1999
- North Indian Ocean cyclone seasons: 1998, 1999
