= T17 =

T17 may refer to:

== Armored vehicles ==
- T17 Deerhound, an American six-wheeled armored car
- T17E1 Staghound, an American four-wheeled armored car
- T-17 tank, a Soviet tankette

== Aviation ==
- English Electric Canberra T.17, a British trainer aircraft
- New Gulf Airport, in Wharton County, Texas, United States
- SAAB-MFI T-17, a Danish trainer aircraft
- Thorp T-17, an American aircraft prototype

== Rail and transit ==
=== Lines ===
- Green Line, of the Stockholm Metro
- T17/18 Beijing-Mudanjiang through train

=== Stations ===
- Kasai Station, Tokyo, Japan
- Miyakojima Station, Osaka, Japan
- Ōyachi Station (Hokkaido), Sapporo, Hokkaido, Japan
- Ueda Station (Nagoya), Nagoya, Aichi Prefecture, Japan
- Uzumasa Tenjingawa Station, Kyoto, Japan
- Zōda Station, Sanuki, Kagawa Prefecture, Japan

== Weapons ==
- Shansi Type 17, a Chinese pistol
- T17, an American prototype autocannon

== Other uses ==
- Cooper T17, a British Formula Three racing car: see Cooper Mk.V
- Estonian national road 17
- T17 road (Tanzania)
- German torpedo boat T17

== See also ==
- Type 17 (disambiguation)
