= M17 agar =

Selective culture medium for Lactococcus

This bacterial growth medium was developed in 1971 for Lactococcus species isolated from milk products. It was originally called M16 medium, but in 1975 Terzaghi and Sandine added disodium-β-glycerophosphate to the medium as a buffer, and named the new growth medium M17 medium. It was later found that the addition of disodium-β-glycerophosphate inhibits the growth of many Lactobacillus species.

== Typical composition ==
Per 950 mL:

- 5.0 g Pancreatic digest of casein
- 5.0 g Soy Peptone
- 5.0 g Beef extract
- 2.5 g Yeast extract
- 0.5 g Ascorbic acid
- 0.25 g Magnesium sulfate
- 19.0 g Disodium-β-glycerophosphate
- 11.0 g Agar

Preparation:

1. Heat with frequent agitation and boil for 1 minute to completely dissolve.
2. Autoclave at 121 °C for 15 minutes. Cool to 50 °C.
3. Add 50 ml filter sterilized 10% lactose solution and mix well (the lactose can be exchanged to other carbohydrates e.g. glucose, resulting in GM17 medium)
