= R-17-class lifeboat =

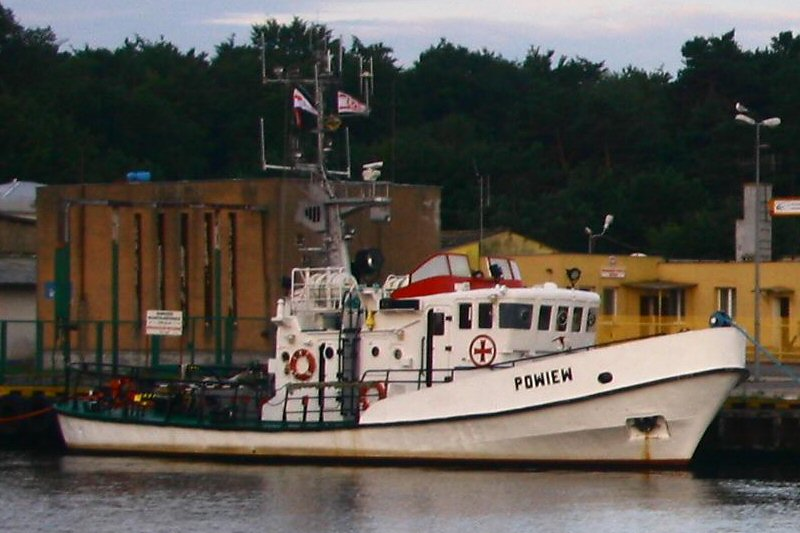
- Powiew in Ustka, 2010

Class overview
- Name: R-17 class
- Builders: Wisła Shipyard, Gdańsk
- Operators: Polskie Ratownictwo Okrętowe; Morska Służba Poszukiwania i Ratownictwa
- Succeeded by: SAR-1500
- Built: 1972–1975
- In service: 1972–2011
- Completed: 8
- Retired: 8
- Preserved: ?

General characteristics
- Tonnage: 55 GRT
- Length: 20.92 m
- Beam: 5.58 m
- Draught: 1.4 m
- Propulsion: 2 × Wola-Henschel H6A diesel engines, 210 hp (157 kW) each, 2 screws
- Speed: 11 knots (13 mph; 20 km/h)
- Range: 600 nmi (1,100 km)
- Capacity: 50
- Complement: 5-8

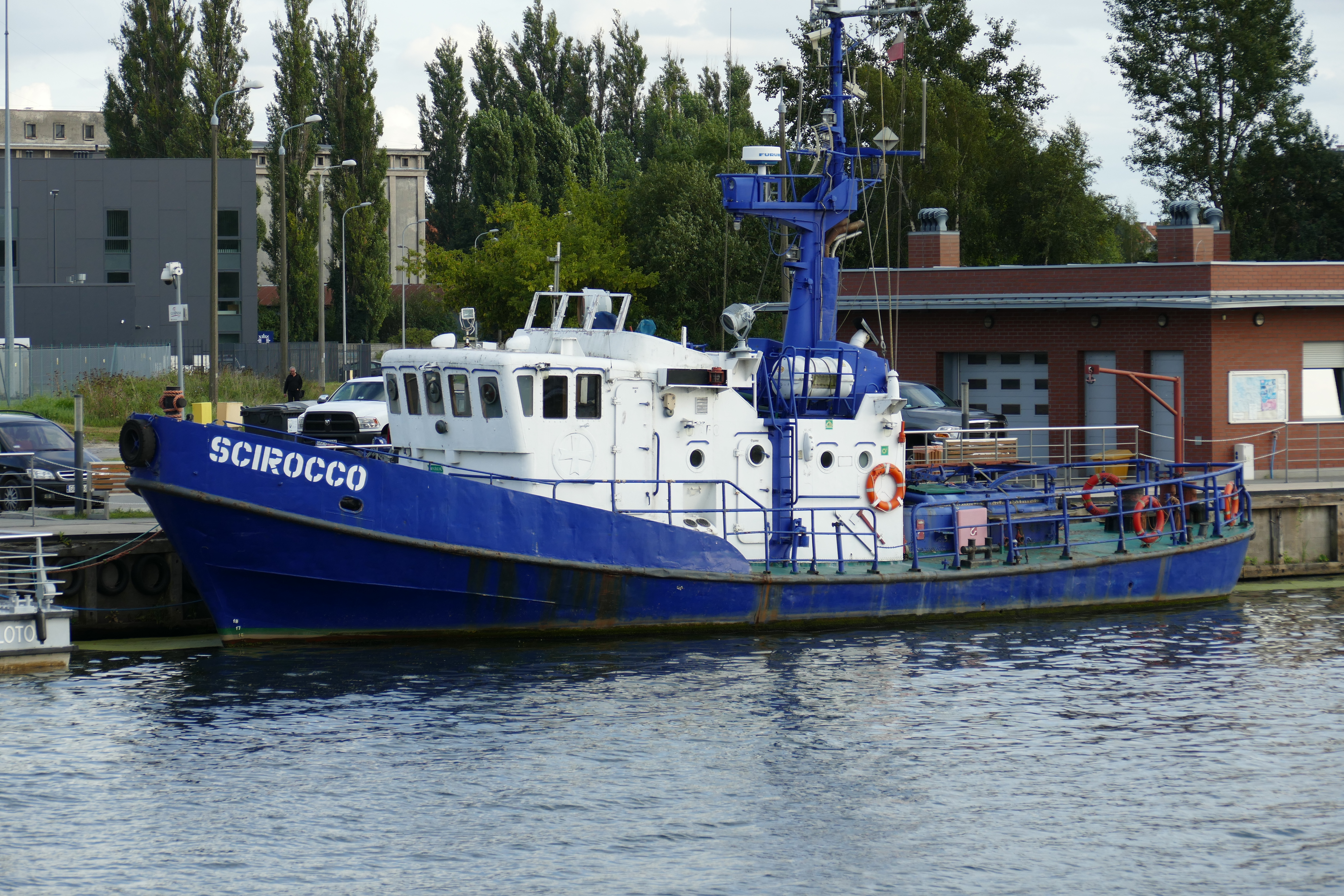
Mistral in private hands, as recreational fishing boat Scirocco

The R-17 class was a class of Polish-built lifeboats and salvage tugs, in Polish service between 1972 and 2011. Eight were built, two of which were used in East Germany.

== History ==
In the 1960s design work commenced in Poland on new steel-hull lifeboats to replace a fleet of old, mostly wooden craft of several types used on the Polish Baltic Sea coast. The operator of lifeboats was the state-owned Polskie Ratownictwo Okrętowe (Polish Ship Salvaging), which was also responsible for marine salvage. It was decided to build two series of craft, the larger R-27 and the smaller R-17 (the numbers coming from predicted hull lengths in meters, R standing for ratowniczy (rescue in Polish)).

The smaller R-17 class was initially intended to be a pure lifeboat design, but eventually it was decided to add salvage capabilities as well. The resulting design was a small salvage tugs. First sketches were made by two Polish bureaus in 1966. The hull was slightly longer than initially intended, but an interval 17 m was kept between outer frames. The designs expected use of imported Western 300 hp Caterpillar engines, but in order to avoid import, the government ordered to use Polish built engines, which had a lower power output. The low maximal speed (predicted 14 knots, eventually 11 knots) raised some discussion, but its increase would have demanded usage of heavier engines and increase of dimensions, while the priority was good sea-keeping qualities and possibility to operate on shallow waters near the coast. The resulting vessel had very good seakeeping qualities in rough sea. Two engines were placed in separate compartments and powered two screws in order to increase reliability and manoeuvrability.

The project was accepted in 1970/1971 and eight craft were ordered in the Wisła shipyard in Gdańsk. They were classified in Poland as kuter ratowniczy (rescue cutter). Six vessels were built for Polskie Ratownictwo Okrętowe in total, while two were sold to German Democratic Republic. The German vessels were not fitted with towing gear. In 1992, after German unification, both German vessels Stoltera and Arkona were donated to the Polish SAR service. Until 1990s, the ships had stations listed below, some changed placed afterwards. In 2002 Polish SAR ships were handed over to government Morska Służba Poszukiwania i Ratownictwa (Maritime Search and Rescue Service). The last R-17 boats were withdrawn from service in 2011, most or all were sold to private hands.

== Fleet ==
Name	Translation	In service	Principal station	Comments
Wiatr	wind	1972–2000	Górki Zachodnie (Gdańsk)	
Halny	halny	1973–1997	Władysławowo	
Mistral	mistral	1973–2007	Dziwnów	later recreational boat Scirocco
Monsun	monsoon	1973–2000	Łeba	
Stoltera (1974); Powiew (1992)	Stoltera wind gust	1974–2011	Warnemünde; Ustka	for GDR, in 1992 given to Poland
Arkona (1974); Szkwał II (1992)	Arkona squall II	1974–1998	Sassnitz; Kołobrzeg	for GDR, in 1992 given to Poland
Zefir	zephyr	1975–2011	Darłowo	
Pasat	passat	1975–2002	Gdynia	
