= 17 =

Seventeen or 17 most often refers to:

- 17 (number), the natural number following 16 and preceding 18
- One of the years 17 BC, AD 17, 1917, 2017, 2117

Seventeen or 17 may also refer to:

== Arts and media ==
=== Literature ===
==== Magazines ====
- Seventeen (American magazine)
- Seventeen (Japanese magazine)

==== Novels ====
- Seventeen (Tarkington novel), 1916, by Booth Tarkington
- Seventeen (Sebuntiin), 1961, by Kenzaburō Ōe
- Seventeen (Yokoyama novel) (Kuraimāzu hai), 2003, by Hideo Yokoyama
- Seventeen (Serafin novel), 2004, by Shan Serafin

=== Film ===
- Seventeen (1916 film), an American silent comedy
- Number Seventeen, 1932, directed by Alfred Hitchcock
- Seventeen (1940 film), an American comedy
- Stalag 17, an American war film
- Eric Soya's '17' (Danish: Sytten), a 1965 Danish comedy
- Seventeen (1985 film), a documentary
- 17 Again (film), 2009, whose working title was 17
- Seventeen (2019 film), a Spanish drama
- 17 (2026 film), a Macedonian drama
- Seventeen (2026 film), a Canadian drama

=== Television ===
- "Seventeen", a 2017 episode of the animated television series Adventure Time
- Seventeen, a 1994 UK dramatic TV short starring Christien Anholt
- "Seventeen" (The Killing), a 2013 episode of the American television drama series The Killing

=== Theatre ===
- Number 17 (play), a 1925 work by the British writer Joseph Jefferson Farjeon
- Seventeen (musical), a 1951 Broadway musical based on Booth Tarkington's novel
- Seventeen (play), a 1917 stage play based on Booth Tarkington's novel

=== Music ===
==== Albums ====
- Seventeen (Keisha White album), and the title song 2007
- Seventeen (Iris album), 2012
- 17 (Motel album), and the title song
- 17 (Ricky Martin album), 2008
- 17 (Tokio album), 2012
- 17 (XXXTentacion album), 2017
- 17 (Zhavia Ward EP), 2019
- 17 (Gettomasa EP), 2017

==== Songs ====
- "17" (MK song), 2017, by Marc Kinchen
- "17" (Madame song), 2019, by Madame
- "17", 2020, by Pink Sweats
- "17", by Avril Lavigne from Avril Lavigne
- "17", by Cory Marks from Sorry for Nothing
- "17", by Cross Canadian Ragweed from Cross Canadian Ragweed
- "17", by Hedley from Cageless
- "17", by Kings of Leon from Only by the Night
- "17", by Madison Beer from Silence Between Songs
- "17", by Mandy Moore from Mandy Moore
- "17", by Milburn from Well Well Well
- "17", by Rick James from Reflections
- "17", by Sky Ferreira
- "17", by The Smashing Pumpkins from Adore
- "17", by Stand Atlantic from Was Here
- "17", by Yourcodenameis:Milo from Ignoto
- "17", by Youth Lagoon from The Year of Hibernation
- "#17", by Aphex Twin from Selected Ambient Works Volume II
- "7 Teen", 1979 single by The Regents
- "At Seventeen", Janis Ian song
- "Seventeen" (Alessia Cara song), from Four Pink Walls
- "Seventeen" (Boyd Bennett song), a 1955 popular song
- "Seventeen" by Bobby Brown from King of Stage
- "Seventeen" (Jet song), 2010
- "Seventeen" (Ladytron song), 2002
- "Seventeen" (Marina and the Diamonds song) from Mermaid Vs. Sailor EP
- "Seventeen" (S.H.E song), a 2018 anniversary single by Taiwanese girl group S.H.E
- "Seventeen" (Simon Webbe song), from Grace
- "Seventeen" (Winger song), 1988
- "Seventeen" (Yoasobi song), 2023
- "Seventeen", by The Elders from American Wake
- "Seventeen", by ¡Forward, Russia! from Give Me a Wall
- "Seventeen", by Girls' Generation from Forever 1
- "Seventeen", by Jimmy Eat World from Static Prevails
- "Seventeen", by Joyner Lucas from Not Now I'm Busy
- "Seventeen", by Lake Street Dive from Bad Self Portraits
- "Seventeen", by Let Loose from Let Loose
- "Seventeen", by Machinae Supremacy from Redeemer
- "Seventeen", by Rich Brian
- "Seventeen", by Sex Pistols from Never Mind the Bollocks, Here's the Sex Pistols
- "Seventeen", by Sharon Van Etten from Remind Me Tomorrow
- "Seventeen", by Troye Sivan from Bloom
- "Seventeen", by X Marks the Pedwalk from Inner Zone Journey
- "Seventeen", from Repo! The Genetic Opera
- "Seventeen", from Heathers: The Musical
- "Seventeen", by Tyler Braden which represented Tennessee in the American Song Contest

==== Performers ====
- The 17, a UK choir
- Seventeen (South Korean band), a South Korean boy group
- Seventeen (Indonesian band), a former Indonesian band group
- Seventeen, a UK band that later became The Alarm

== Vehicles and transportation ==
=== Aircraft ===
- Beechcraft Model 17, an American light transport
- Boeing B-17 Flying Fortress, an American WWII bomber
- Boeing C-17 Globemaster III, an American cargo plane
- Bréguet 17, a French WWI fighter
- Consolidated 17, an American light airliner
- Dornier Do 17, a German WWI bomber
- FBA 17, a French 1920s flying boat
- Latécoère 17, a French 1920s airliner
- Mil Mi-17, a Soviet helicopter
- Mikoyan-Gurevich MiG-17, a Soviet fighter jet
- Nieuport 17, a French WWI fighter
- Northrop YF-17 Cobra, an American prototype fighter jet
- Potez 17, a French reconnaissance aircraft
- Saab 17, a Swedish WWII light bomber
- SPAD S.XVII, a French WWI fighter
- Sukhoi Su-17, a Soviet fighter-bomber jet
- Tachikawa Ki-17, a Japanese WWII trainer
- Yakovlev Yak-17, a Soviet fighter jet

=== Other vehicles ===
- USS Carnelian (PY-19), a 1930 converted yacht originally named Seventeen
- Lockheed X-17, an American experimental rocket
- Tatra 17, an automobile
- Renault 17, a fastback hatchback coupé

== Science ==
- Chlorine, atomic number 17, a halogen in the periodic table
- 17 Thetis, an asteroid in the asteroid belt

== Other uses ==
- Seventeen, Ohio, an American unincorporated community in Tuscarawas County
- 17 (app), a photo and video app for Android and iOS

== See also ==
- List of highways numbered 17
- 117 (disambiguation)
- B17 (disambiguation)
- C17 (disambiguation)
- Class 17 (disambiguation)
- F17 (disambiguation)
- M17 (disambiguation)
- Model 17 (disambiguation)
- T17 (disambiguation)
- Type 17 (disambiguation)
