= USS Carnelian =

Patrol vessel of the United States Navy

- USS Carnelian (PY-19)

History

United States
- Name: Trudione (October 1930−December 1930); Seventeen (December 1930−June 1941)
- Builder: Bath Iron Works, Bath, Maine
- Laid down: 5 May 1930
- Launched: 18 October 1930
- Renamed: Seventeen, December 1930
- Fate: Sold to the US Navy 13 May 1941

History

United States
- Name: Carnelian
- Namesake: Carnelian
- Acquired: 13 May 1941
- Commissioned: 7 June 1941
- Decommissioned: 4 January 1946
- Stricken: 21 January 1946
- Identification: Hull symbol:PY-19; Code letters:NAXU
- Fate: Transferred to the Maritime Commission, 24 October 1946

General characteristics
- Type: Patrol yacht
- Displacement: 500 long tons (508 t)
- Length: 190 ft 11 in (58.19 m)
- Beam: 26 ft (7.9 m)
- Draft: 11 ft (3.4 m)
- Installed power: 2 × Cooper Bessemer JR-8 diesel engines; 1,700 bhp (1,300 kW)
- Propulsion: 2 × screws
- Speed: 13 knots (24 km/h; 15 mph)
- Complement: 59 officers and enlisted
- Armament: 1 × 3 in (76 mm)/50 caliber gun; 2 × depth charge tracks

USS Carnelian (PY-19) was a converted yacht that patrolled with the United States Navy in World War II. She was named for carnelian, a semi-precious stone.

== Construction, acquisition, and commissioning ==
Carnelian was built as the yacht Trudione in 1930 by Bath Iron Works, Bath, Maine for Ross W. Judson who was president of Bath Iron Works and Continental Motors Corporation. It was named after his twin daughters, Trudi & Ione. She was renamed Seventeen in December 1930. She was then purchased by the Navy on 13 May 1941 and commissioned on 7 June 1941.

== Service history ==
Carnelian arrived at Jacksonville, Florida, on 23 February 1942 for patrol duty in the Caribbean. Later based on New Orleans, Louisiana for duty escorting convoys to Galveston, Texas and Key West, Carnelian provided essential services to the Gulf Sea Frontier in its task of guarding a wide area with minimal forces. From November 1942 through January 1944, the converted yacht screened convoys, composed primarily of tankers with cargoes of oil, between Trinidad and Recife, Brazil.

After overhaul, Carnelian joined the anti-submarine training group based at Norfolk, Virginia, with whom she served until 25 January 1945. Assigned then to the Potomac River Naval Command, she was based at the Mine Warfare Test Station, Solomons, Maryland, for mine test operations in Chesapeake Bay.

Carnelian was decommissioned on 4 January 1946 and transferred to the Maritime Commission on 24 October 1946.
