= NSB Cmb Class 17 =

Norwegian petrol railcar

Class 17
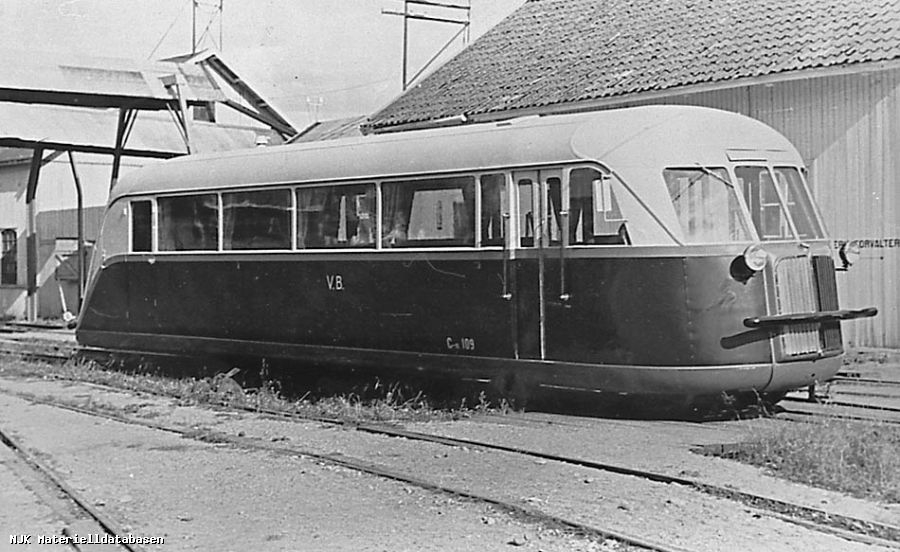
- In service: 1935–1955
- Manufacturer: Strømmens Værksted
- Constructed: 1935
- Number built: 1
- Capacity: 40
- Operator: Norwegian State Railways

Specifications
- Car length: 13.33 m (43.7 ft)
- Maximum speed: 100 km/h (62 mph)
- Weight: 9.7 t (9.5 long tons; 10.7 short tons)
- Prime mover: Buda gasoline
- Power output: 90 kW (120 hp)
- Track gauge: 1,435 mm (4 ft 8 1/2 in)

Kristine Valdresdatter, officially known as NSB Cmb17a or Class 17, was a single railcar built by Strømmens Værksted in 1935. The train has a Buda gasoline prime mover with a mechanical transmission. This gave a power output of 90 kilowatts (120 hp) and a maximum speed of 100 kilometers per hour (62 mph). Originally delivered to the private Valdres Line. The Norwegian State Railways (NSB) took over the line in 1937. It was used on the Numedal Line from 1939 and the Grimstad Line from 1947. After a derailment in 1955, the railcar was retired and has been scrapped.

== Specifications ==
Kristine Valdresdatter was a three-axle railcar, with a bogie at the front and a carrier axle at the back. It had a 90-kilowatt (120 hp) Buda gasoline prime mover with a mechanical transmission. The train was built on a steel chassis with a wood and aluminum body. It had a low floor height, easing entry, giving a low center of gravity and thus better driving properties. It weighed 9.7 tonnes (9.5 long tons; 10.7 short tons) and had a maximum speed of 100 kilometers per hour (62 mph). The overall length was 13.33 meters (43 ft 9 in), and 12.80 meters (42 ft 0 in) without buffers. The train had a seating capacity for 40 plus 5 folding seats in the driver's cab.

== History ==
The class was ordered as the only railcar for the Valdres Line. Built by Strømmens Værksted, it was design-wise similar to the Gullfisk trams which later would be delivered to the Oslo Tramway. Kristine Valdresdatter was delivered to the private railway with road number 109. In 1937, the line was taken over by NSB, and the train was given number 18247 and designated Cmb Class 17. As the nationalization resulted in more direct services to Oslo, there was no longer need for the railcar on the line, and it was transferred to the Numedal Line on 21 July 1939. On 12 January 1946, the train was transferred to Stavanger, but was little used. The railcar had a loose tire and procuring a replacement rubber spacer deemed difficult. It was transferred for use on the Grimstad Line on 7 May 1947. On 5 August 1955, the railcar derailed at Fjære, causing a break of axle. The train was therefore set aside, and was decided retired from 7 April 1956. Part of the reason for the early retirement was that the railcar only had a driver's cab in one end, making it difficult to turn. The railcar has been scrapped.
