= Rivière de l'Est =

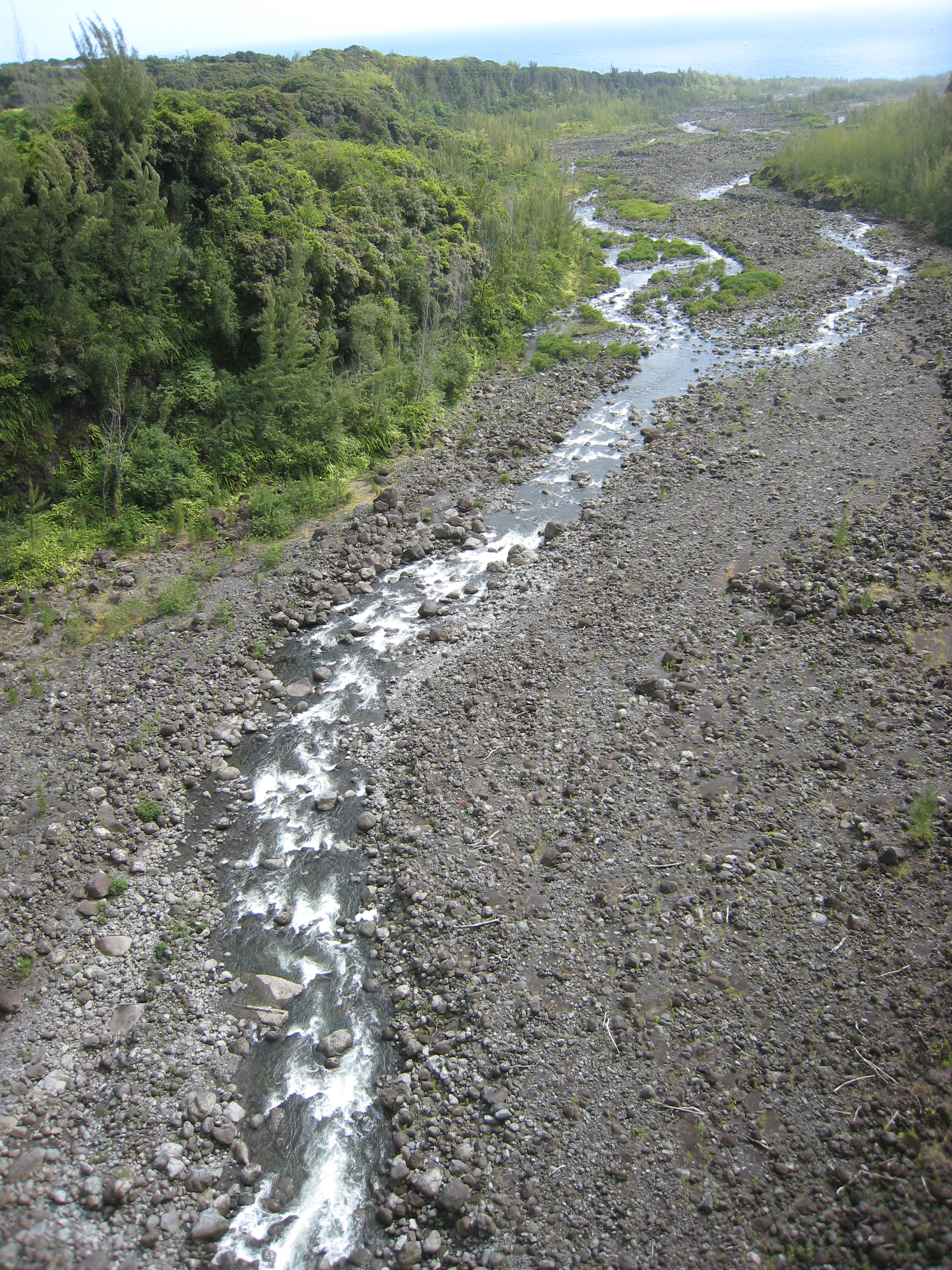
- View from the bridge across Le Rivière de l'Est

Location
- Country: France
- Region: Réunion

Physical characteristics
- Source
  - elevation: 2,350 ft (720 m)
- Mouth
  - location: Indian Ocean
  - coordinates: 21°6′22″S 55°46′13″E
  - elevation: sea level
- Length: 21.2 km (13.2 mi)

The Rivière de l'Est is a river on the Indian Ocean island of Réunion. It flows northeast from the southeast of the island, reaching the sea between the towns of Sainte-Anne and Sainte-Rose. It is 21.2 km (13.2 mi) long.

The Rivière de l'Est flows down the slopes of the shield volcano Piton de la Fournaise from an elevation of 720 metres (2,350 ft) above sea level.
