= 1998–99 Southern Hemisphere tropical cyclone season =

The 1998–99 Southern Hemisphere tropical cyclone season comprises three different basins. Their respective seasons are:

- 1998–99 South-West Indian Ocean cyclone season west of 90°E
- 1998–99 Australian region cyclone season between 90°E and 160°E
- 1998–99 South Pacific cyclone season east of 160°E
