= Saint-Philippe =

Commune in Réunion, France

- Commune
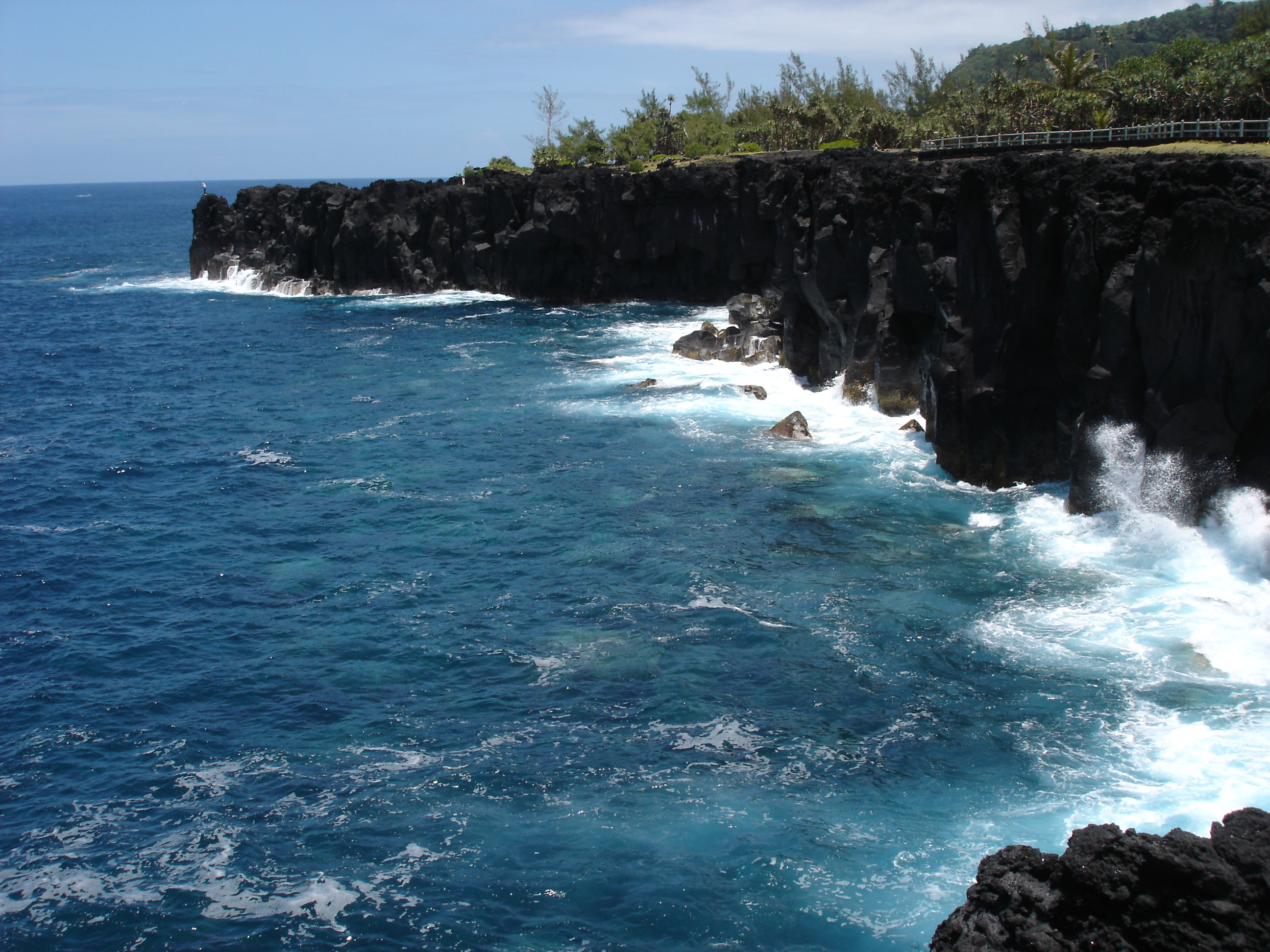
- Cap Méchant in st phillippe

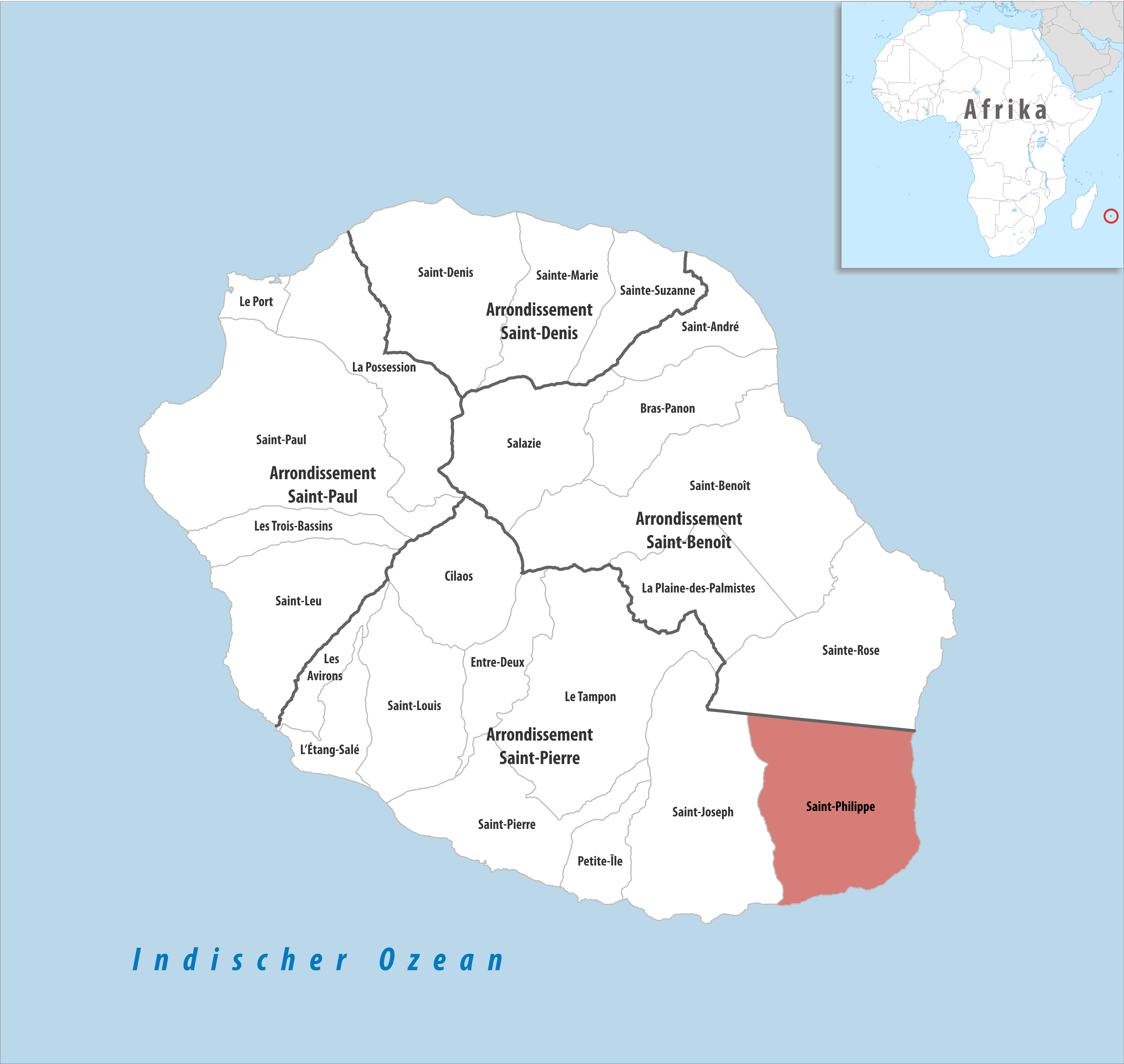
- Location of Saint-Philippe
- Coordinates: 21°21′34″S 55°46′04″E
- Country: France
- Overseas region and department: Réunion
- Arrondissement: Saint-Pierre
- Canton: Saint-Benoît-2
- Intercommunality: CA du Sud

Government
  - Mayor (2020–2026): Olivier Rivière
- Area^{1}: 153.94 km^{2} (59.44 sq mi)
- Elevation: 40 m (130 ft)
- Highest elevation: 2,630 m (8,630 ft)
- Lowest elevation: 0 m (0 ft)
- Population (2023): 5,082
  - Density: 33.01/km^{2} (85.50/sq mi)
- Time zone: UTC+04:00
- INSEE/Postal code: 97417 /97442
- ^{1} French Land Register data, which excludes lakes, ponds, glaciers > 1 km^{2} (0.386 sq mi or 247 acres) and river estuaries.

Saint-Philippe (French pronunciation: [sɛ̃ filip]) is a commune in the French overseas department of Réunion. It is located in the southeast of the island.

== Geography ==
Saint-Philippe is on the highest point on the island. It borders the municipalities of Saint-Joseph and Sainte-Rose, to the west and north respectively. Although it is a coastal area, the administrative center is in Les Hauts (the highland area of the island).

=== Climate ===
Saint-Philippe has a tropical rainforest climate (Köppen climate classification Af). The average annual temperature in Saint-Philippe is 23.1 °C (73.6 °F). The average annual rainfall is 4,260.3 mm (167.73 in) with March as the wettest month. The temperatures are highest on average in January, at around 26.2 °C (79.2 °F), and lowest in July, at around 20.0 °C (68.0 °F). The highest temperature ever recorded in Saint-Philippe was 34.7 °C (94.5 °F) on 10 December 2019; the coldest temperature ever recorded was 13.7 °C (56.7 °F) on 20 August 2008.

Climate data for Saint-Philippe (1981−2010 normals, extremes 1989−present)
Month	Jan	Feb	Mar	Apr	May	Jun	Jul	Aug	Sep	Oct	Nov	Dec	Year
Record high °C (°F)	34.3 (93.7)	34.2 (93.6)	34.4 (93.9)	32.2 (90.0)	30.1 (86.2)	28.5 (83.3)	30.0 (86.0)	29.0 (84.2)	29.5 (85.1)	31.7 (89.1)	32.5 (90.5)	34.7 (94.5)	34.7 (94.5)
Mean daily maximum °C (°F)	29.8 (85.6)	29.4 (84.9)	28.7 (83.7)	27.4 (81.3)	25.8 (78.4)	24.0 (75.2)	22.7 (72.9)	22.9 (73.2)	24.0 (75.2)	25.4 (77.7)	27.2 (81.0)	29.0 (84.2)	26.3 (79.3)
Daily mean °C (°F)	26.2 (79.2)	26.1 (79.0)	25.5 (77.9)	24.4 (75.9)	22.8 (73.0)	21.1 (70.0)	20.0 (68.0)	20.1 (68.2)	20.8 (69.4)	22.0 (71.6)	23.5 (74.3)	25.2 (77.4)	23.1 (73.6)
Mean daily minimum °C (°F)	22.5 (72.5)	22.8 (73.0)	22.4 (72.3)	21.4 (70.5)	19.8 (67.6)	18.2 (64.8)	17.4 (63.3)	17.3 (63.1)	17.6 (63.7)	18.6 (65.5)	19.7 (67.5)	21.5 (70.7)	19.9 (67.8)
Record low °C (°F)	19.5 (67.1)	18.3 (64.9)	18.8 (65.8)	17.2 (63.0)	15.7 (60.3)	14.6 (58.3)	14.2 (57.6)	13.7 (56.7)	14.1 (57.4)	14.5 (58.1)	15.4 (59.7)	17.7 (63.9)	13.7 (56.7)
Average precipitation mm (inches)	399.0 (15.71)	555.2 (21.86)	564.4 (22.22)	445.4 (17.54)	345.5 (13.60)	299.9 (11.81)	370.1 (14.57)	341.7 (13.45)	275.2 (10.83)	216.0 (8.50)	172.2 (6.78)	275.7 (10.85)	4,260.3 (167.73)
Average precipitation days (≥ 1.0 mm)	18.8	20.2	21.1	20.0	19.2	19.1	23.3	20.8	17.4	15.8	12.3	14.6	222.6
Source: Météo-France

== History ==
A notable event in the commune's history was in 1897, when the British troopship RIMS Warren Hastings ran aground in the middle of the night. Two seamen died as a result, the crash sparked by a compass malfunction resulting from the eruption of the Piton de la Fournaise. On board the ship was some electricity, for which the village of Tremblet would have to wait until 1984 to finally receive.

== Population ==
Historical population
Year	Pop.	±% p.a.
1967	3,336	—
1974	3,453	+0.49%
1982	3,476	+0.08%
1990	4,005	+1.79%
1999	4,860	+2.17%
2007	5,129	+0.68%
2012	5,072	−0.22%
2017	5,260	+0.73%
2023	5,082	−0.57%
Source: INSEE

== See also ==
- Communes of the Réunion department
- Ravine d'Ango
