= 1998–99 South-West Indian Ocean cyclone season =

Cyclone season in the Southwest Indian Ocean

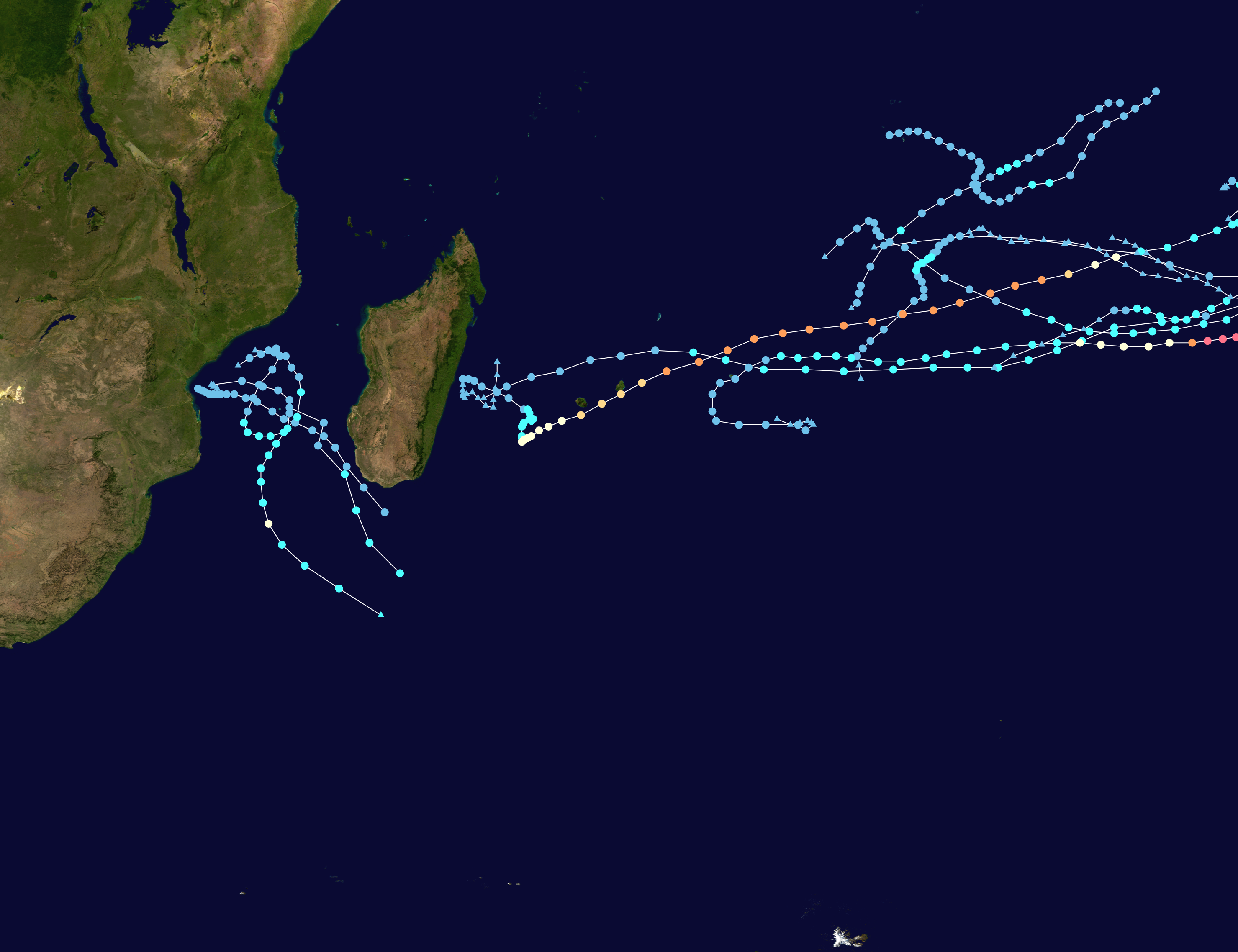
- Season summary map

Seasonal boundaries
- First system formed: September 3, 1998
- Last system dissipated: April 24, 1999

Strongest storm
- Name: Evrina
  - Maximum winds: 175 km/h (110 mph) (10-minute sustained)
  - Lowest pressure: 925 hPa (mbar)

Seasonal statistics
- Total disturbances: 14
- Total depressions: 9
- Total storms: 6
- Tropical cyclones: 2
- Intense tropical cyclones: 2
- Total fatalities: 2 total
- Total damage: Unknown

Related articles
- 1998–99 Australian region cyclone season; 1998–99 South Pacific cyclone season

The 1998–99 South-West Indian Ocean cyclone season was a quiet season that had the fourth-lowest number of days with tropical storm or tropical cyclone activity. Most of the storms formed either in the Mozambique Channel or in the far eastern portion of the basin, with five storms crossing from the adjacent Australian basin east of 90° E. As a result, few storms impacted Madagascar, and none made landfall on the African continent. Throughout most of the season, there was below-normal sea surface temperatures in the Indian Ocean east of Madagascar. In February, typically the peak in activity, Réunion island recorded its highest average monthly pressure since 1953. Due to generally unfavorable conditions, there were only six tropical storms tracked by the Météo-France office (MFR) on Réunion. There were only two tropical cyclones – a storm with winds of at least 120 km/h (75 mph).

Activity began late, with the first tropical storm – Alda – forming on January 16, the third latest ever recorded at the time. Alda formed in the Mozambique Channel, which was one of few favorable areas for tropical cyclogenesis in the season. It brought rainfall to southwestern Madagascar that alleviated previously dry conditions. The next five tropical storms either originated or crossed into the adjacent Australian basin, where storms were monitored by the Bureau of Meteorology (BoM). Both Tropical Storm Chikita and Tropical Cyclone Davina brought beneficial rainfall to the Mascarene Islands. The latter storm caused two drowning deaths on Réunion and caused some crop damage. The strongest storm – Evrina – peaked as a strong cyclone in the Australian but weakened upon crossing 90°E, with 10-minute maximum sustained winds of 175 km/h (110 mph) in the basin. The final storm was unnamed, crossing from the Australian basin on April 21 as a minimal tropical storm before quickly dissipating. There were also several tropical disturbances or depressions, many short-lived. The first of these formed on September 3 in the northeastern portion of the basin, and there was a tropical depression in February in the Mozambique Channel that approached tropical storm status.

== Season summary ==
The Météo-France office (MFR) on Réunion island issued warnings in tropical cyclones within the basin during the season. The agency estimated intensity through the Dvorak technique, and warned on tropical cyclones in the region from the coast of Africa to 90° E, south of the equator. The Joint Typhoon Warning Center – a joint United States Navy – United States Air Force task force – also issued tropical cyclone warnings for the region. Wind estimates from Météo-France and most other basins throughout the world are sustained over 10 minutes, while estimates from the United States-based Joint Typhoon Warning Center are sustained over 1 minute. 10 minute winds are about 1.14 times the amount of 1 minute winds. Most storms formed and dissipated within the tropics, with the exception of Severe Tropical Storm Alda.

During the season, atmospheric conditions shifted from El Niño to La Niña, but despite the shift, the season was similarly inactive as its predecessor. In general, sea surface temperatures were below normal, and atmospheric pressures were above normal, both unfavorable for tropical cyclogenesis. In the month of February, on average the peak time for activity, there was a general lack of convection, or thunderstorms, east of Madagascar. The average monthly pressure on Réunion was the highest since reliable records began in 1953. The low number of storms occurred despite an otherwise active cyclone year in the southern hemisphere. In its summary of the season, the MFR described the lack of activity as "rare and remarkable", possibly related to a Walker circulation. The agency monitored 14 tropical disturbances, of which only eight were tropical depressions for at least 24 hours. Six of these intensified into tropical storms, three less than the average of nine, of which only two attained tropical cyclone status, or half the average. There were 28 days in which there was storm or tropical cyclone activity, less than the average of 42 and at the time the fourth lowest since reliable record-keeping began in 1967 with the advent of satellite imagery. The only seasons with a lower number of storm days were 1982–83, 1986–87, and 1997–98.

== Systems ==
=== Severe Tropical Storm Alda ===
- Severe tropical storm (MFR)
- Category 1 tropical cyclone (SSHWS)
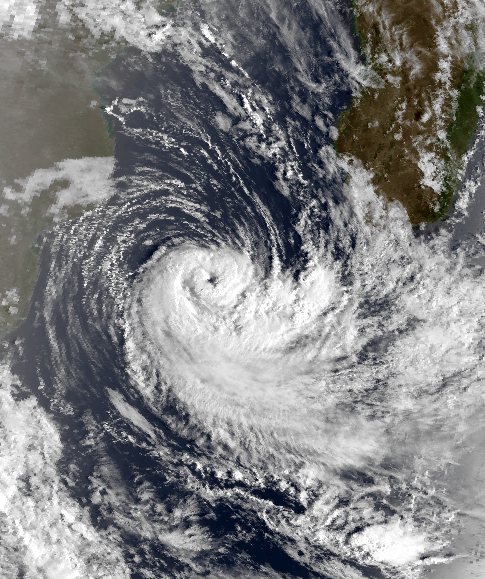
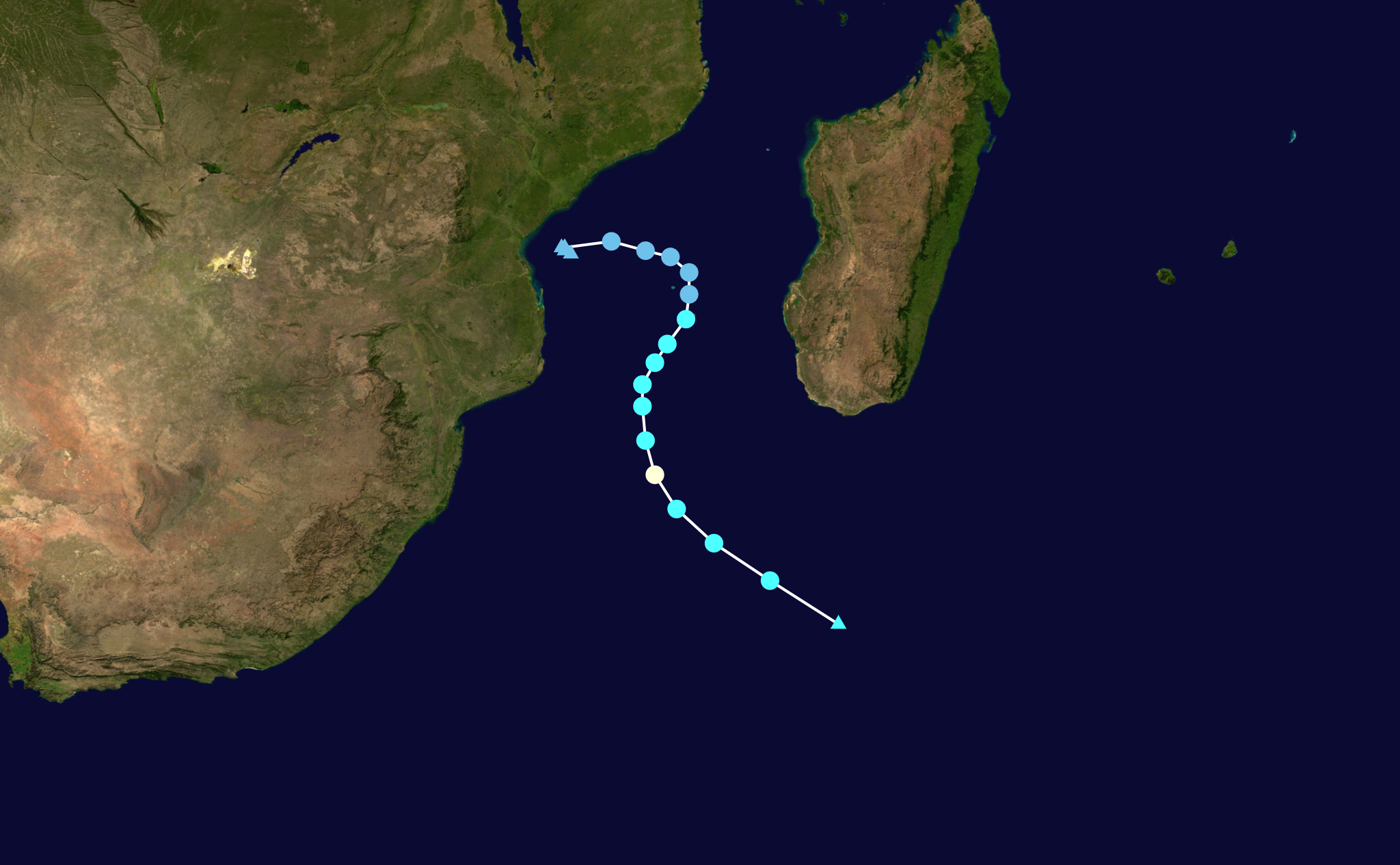
- Duration: January 14 – January 19
- Peak intensity: 105 km/h (65 mph) (10-min); 975 hPa (mbar)

After a subtropical depression exited the Mozambique Channel, another area of convection formed in the region on January 8, which fluctuated in intensity for several days. A passing cold front increased convection further on January 12, which split off a cutoff low-pressure area. Two days later, a subtropical disturbance formed offshore Beira, Mozambique, classified due to the extratropical origins and lack of centralized convection. The system remained nearly stationary, with the convection extending well to the east. On January 16, the MFR reclassified the system as a tropical depression after the thunderstorms increased near the center, the increasing organization due to moderate but decreasing wind shear. By that time, the depression had begun an eastward movement, but soon turned to the south in the weakness between two high-pressure areas. Late on January 16, the depression intensified into Tropical Storm Alda after the convection organized into a central dense overcast. Also that day, the JTWC began tracking the system as Tropical Cyclone 12S. This marked an unusually late start for the first named storm, at the time the third-latest on record.

Neither the MFR nor the JTWC anticipated much strengthening after Alda attained tropical storm status. Around the time of its upgrade, Alda passed about 20 km (12 mi) west of Europa Island in the Mozambique Channel, where sustained winds reached 72 km/h (45 mph) and gusts were as strong as 90 km/h (56 mph). A building ridge southeast of Madagascar turned the storm to the southwest. After an increase in wind shear diminished the convection, the JTWC discontinued advisories on January 17, although the thunderstorms redeveloped following an unexpected decrease in wind shear. Alda turned to the southeast ahead of an approaching trough, and developed a ragged eye feature on January 18. That day, the MFR estimated peak 10-minute winds of 95 km/h (60 mph), and the JTWC estimated one-minute winds of 120 km/h (75 mph), equivalent to a minimal hurricane. The latter agency also reissued one advisory when the storm was at its peak. Alda accelerated to the southeast and gradually lost tropical characteristics, becoming extratropical on January 19 before being absorbed by the approaching cold front.

Following rainfall from an earlier subtropical depression, Alda dropped 198 mm (7.8 in) of rainfall in Morombe in southwestern Madagascar. The rainfall caused flooding that affected thousands of people. The rainfall was beneficial in alleviating previously dry conditions that had prevented crops to be planted. The passage of the storm also caused temperatures to decrease in Mozambique and Madagascar.

=== Moderate Tropical Storm Damien–Birenda ===
- Moderate tropical storm (MFR)
- Tropical storm (SSHWS)
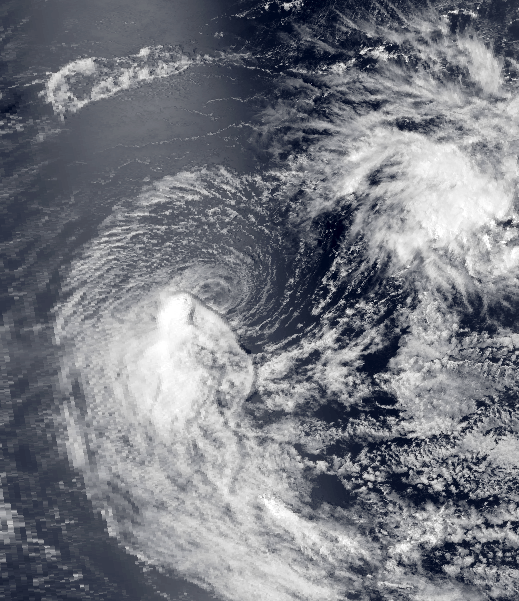
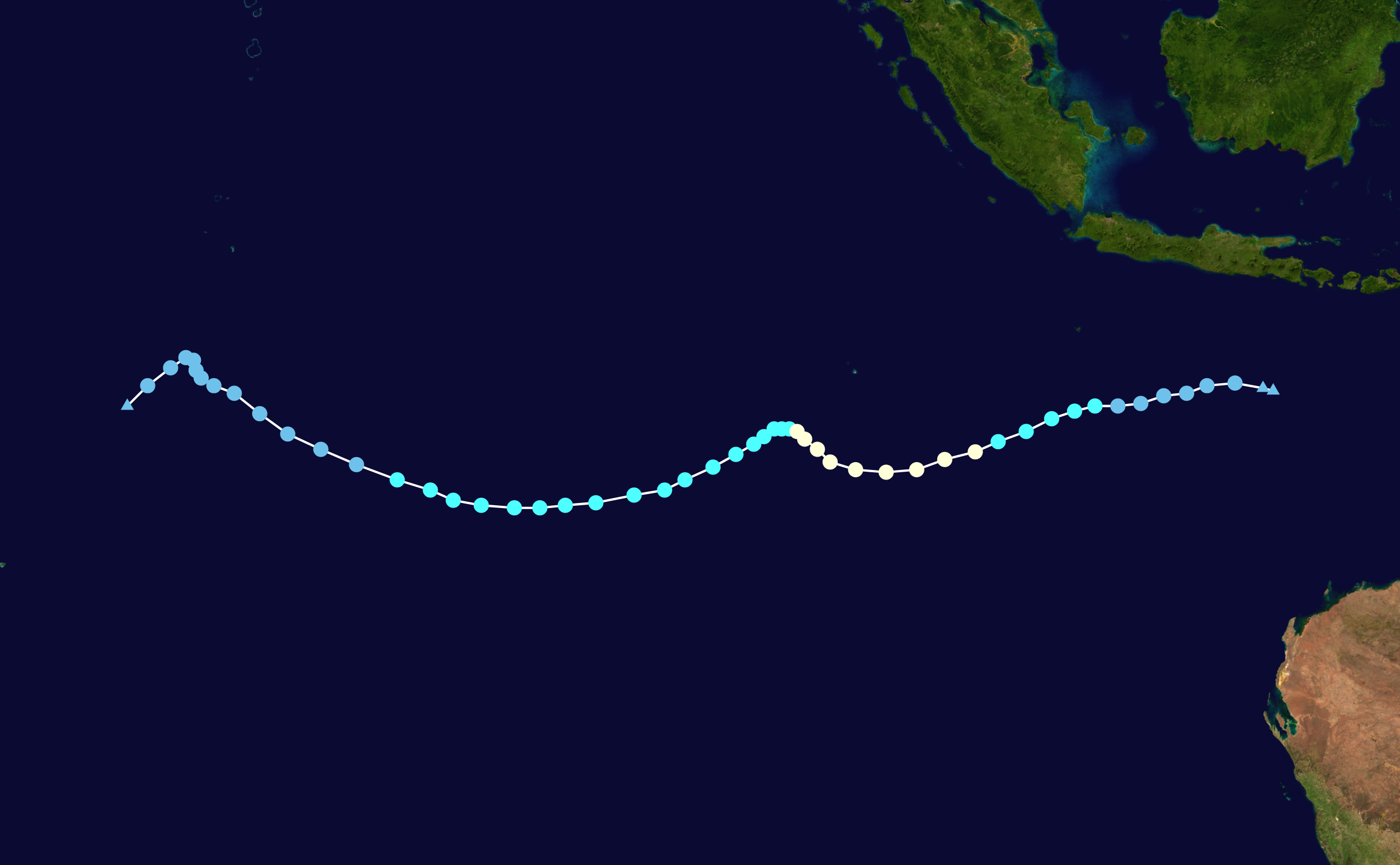
- Duration: January 28 (entered basin) – February 2
- Peak intensity: 65 km/h (40 mph) (10-min); 992 hPa (mbar)

On January 21, a tropical disturbance formed in the Australian region about 500 km (310 mi) south of the Indonesian island of Java. Moving west-southwestward, the system intensified into Tropical Storm Damien on January 23, and attained tropical cyclone status two days later while passing 400 km (250 mi) south of the Cocos Islands. Subsequently, an increase in wind shear induced steady weakening, causing the circulation to be briefly exposed from the convection on January 26. Damien maintained an area of convection nearby the circulation, and exited into the south-west Indian Ocean on January 28 as a minimal tropical storm; at that time, the Mauritius Meteorological Services renamed the storm as Birenda. The storm turned more to the west and west-northwest due to a building ridge to the south. Increasing wind shear weakened Birenda to tropical depression status on January 29 and into a tropical disturbance the next day. Although convection was intermittent, the circulation dissipated on February 3.

=== Moderate Tropical Storm Chikita ===
- Moderate tropical storm (MFR)
- Tropical storm (SSHWS)
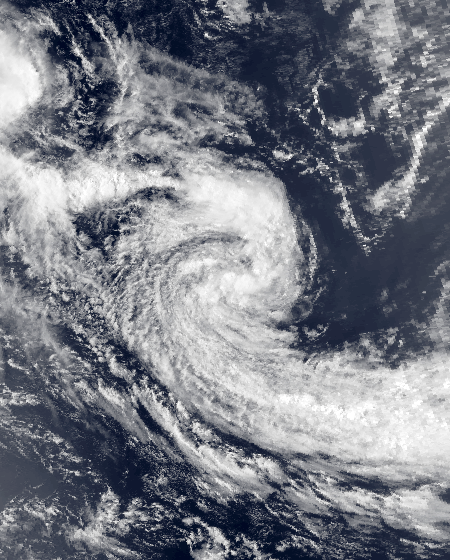
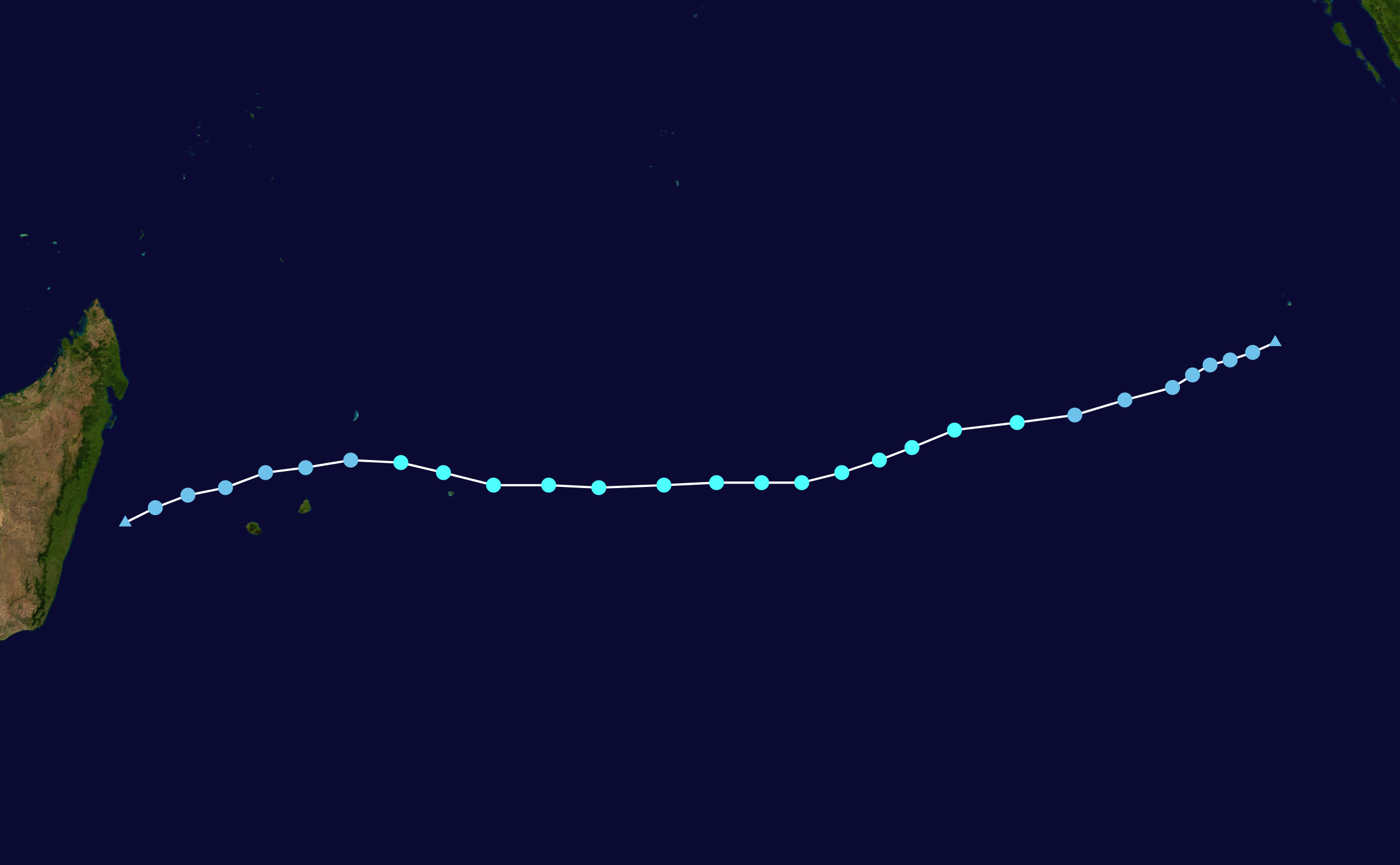
- Duration: January 31 (entered basin) – February 4
- Peak intensity: 70 km/h (45 mph) (10-min); 990 hPa (mbar)

Soon after Damien-Birenda exited the Australian region, another tropical disturbance formed north of the Cocos on January 29, which was initially weak but gradually organized. The disturbance tracked quickly west-westward due to a powerful ridge to the south, remaining in tandem with Tropical Storm Birenda about 1,300 km (810 mi) to the east. On January 31, the system crossed into the south-west Indian Ocean. The fast forward motion caused the effects of wind shear to diminish as well as increase the circulation's strength, and the depression intensified into Tropical Storm Chikita on January 31. At that time, the storm attained its peak intensity of 65 km/h (40 mph). Almost immediately thereafter, the convection began weakening due to lukewarm water temperatures, and Chikita weakened to tropical depression status on February 1. Continuing rapidly to the west, the circulation became exposed from the convection on February 3 due to increased wind shear. Around that time, Chikita passed about 75 km (47 mi) north of Rodrigues island, and shortly thereafter weakened into a tropical disturbance. On the next day, the circulation passed north of both Mauritius and Réunion, presenting an asymmetric structure with the strongest winds to the south. Chikita dissipated on February 5 off the southeast coast of Madagascar.

On Rodrigues, Chikita produced wind gusts of 92 km/h (57 mph) and a rainfall total of 113 mm (4.4 in), the rainfall proving beneficial due to previously dry conditions. Despite only being a tropical disturbance, Chikita produced wind gusts of 89 km/h (55 mph) on Mauritius and 104 km/h (65 mph) in the mountainous peaks of Réunion. The rainfall rates in both islands varied greatly; the peak total on Mauritius was 160 mm (6.3 in) compared to the peak of 560 mm (22 in) in Bébourg in the heights of Réunion. Also on the latter island, there was a six-hour rainfall total of 132 mm (5.2 in) at Piton de la Fournaise. Wet weather persisted after Chikita dissipated, resulting in four-day totals of 953 mm (37.5 in) in Bébourg on Réunion, and easing drought conditions on Mauritius.

=== Tropical Depression D1 ===
- Tropical depression (MFR)
- Tropical storm (SSHWS)
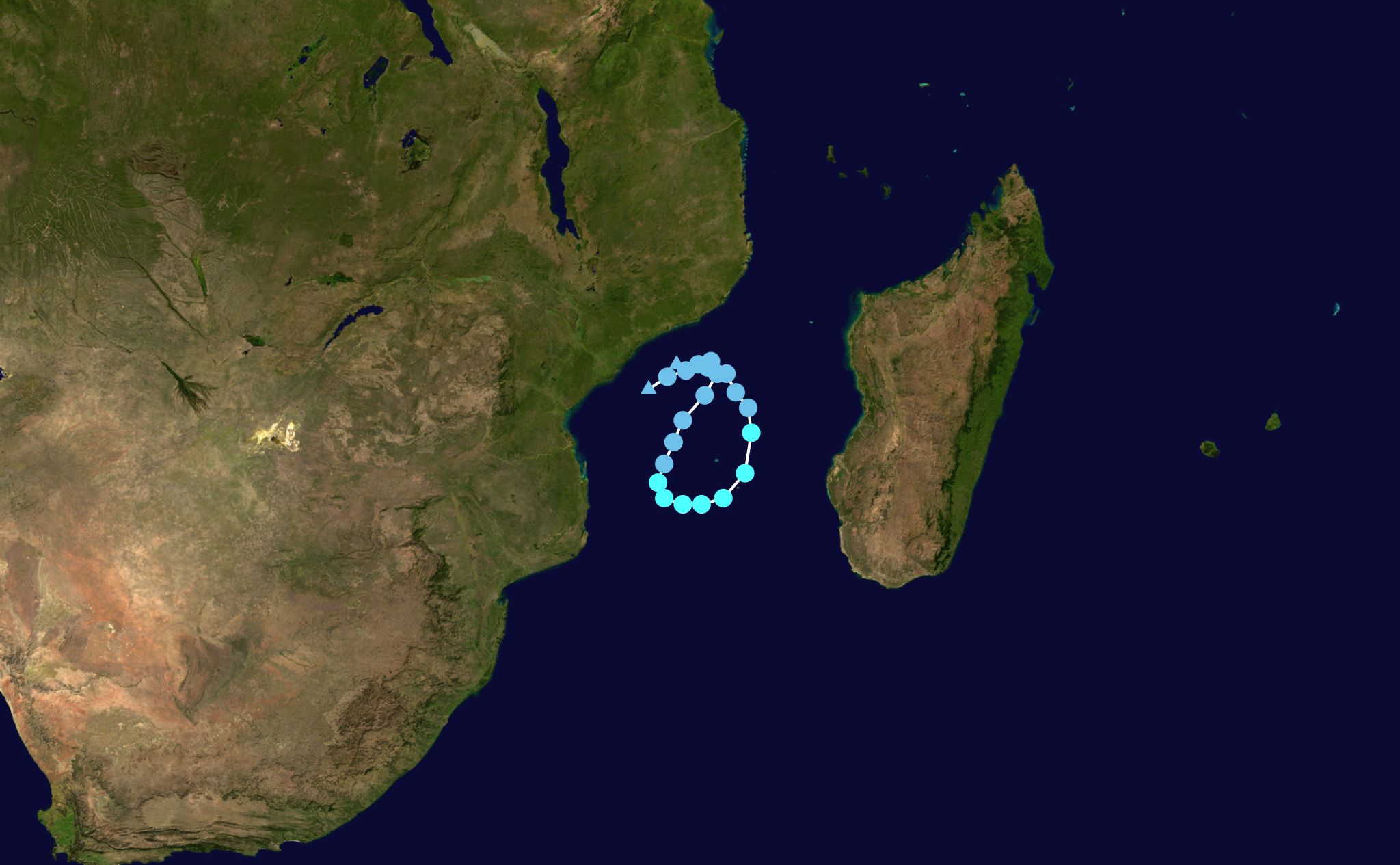
- Duration: February 11 – February 17
- Peak intensity: 55 km/h (35 mph) (10-min); 994 hPa (mbar)

During an extended period of quiet conditions across much of the basin, an area of low pressure persisted along the eastern coast of Mozambique. Convection fluctuated daily but became more persistent on February 11. That day, the thunderstorms organized into a circulation that had formed less than 200 km (120 mi) southeast of Beira, Mozambique, becoming Tropical Disturbance D1. After forming, the system moved southward, developing a central dense overcast with northeasterly outflow. Based on the organization, the disturbance intensified into a tropical depression on February 13. Although there were gale-force winds in the southwest periphery, the circulation was located on the northern edge of the convection. The depression neared tropical storm intensity, but an increase in wind shear from a nearby trough prevented further intensification. The JTWC estimated peak 1-minute winds of 85 km/h (55 mph), making the system a tropical storm by their assessment. A building ridge to the south turned the depression to the northeast, bringing the system near Europa Island. A station on the island recorded sustained winds of 65 km/h (40 mph) with gusts to 104 km/h (65 mph) about three hours before and after the closest approach; the observations suggested that the depression could have become a tropical storm. Soon thereafter, the associated convection dissipated and the circulation turned westward. After crossing over its former path, the depression dissipated on February 17 very close to where it developed.

=== Intense Tropical Cyclone Davina ===
- Intense tropical cyclone (MFR)
- Category 3 tropical cyclone (SSHWS)
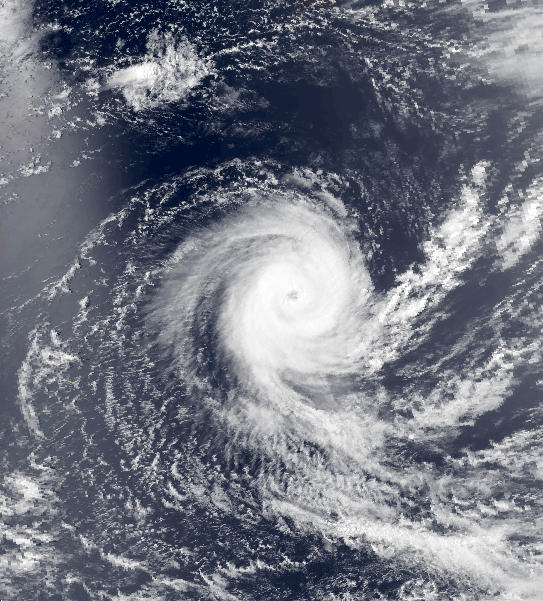
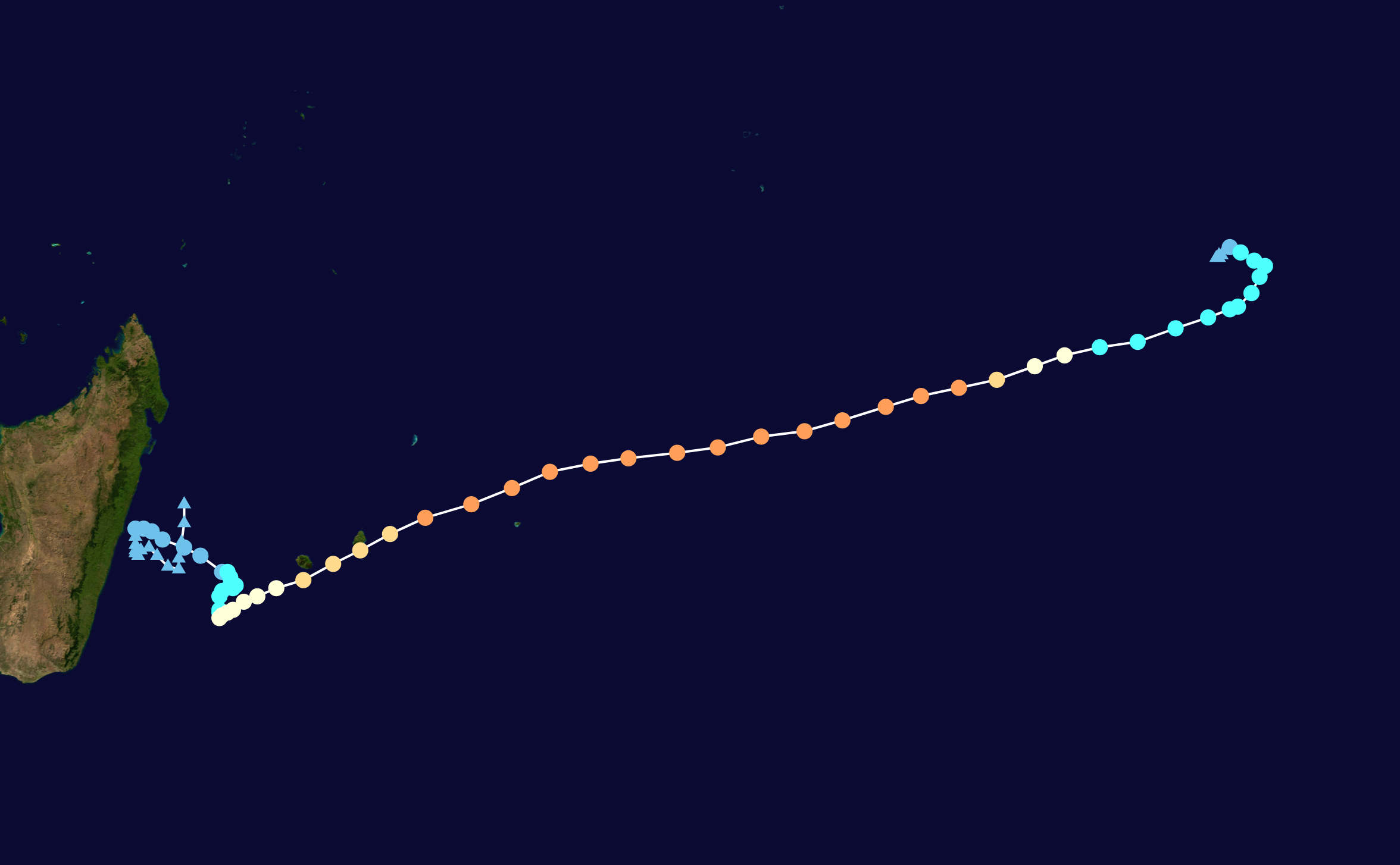
- Duration: March 2 – March 19
- Peak intensity: 165 km/h (105 mph) (10-min); 930 hPa (mbar)

After an extended period with no activity across much of the Indian Ocean, the Intertropical Convergence Zone (ITCZ) rebuilt toward the end of February, and spawned an area of convection on March 1 in the extreme eastern portion of the basin. The next day, a circulation was noted on satellite imagery to the northeast of the convection, which indicated that a tropical disturbance had developed. The influence of the monsoon trough steered the disturbance to the southeast into the Australian basin, where moderate wind shear prevented quick development. A building ridge to the south turned the system to the southwest, bringing it back into the south-west Indian on March 3 as a tropical depression. With decreasing wind shear, the depression slowly intensified as convection increased, becoming Tropical Storm Davina on March 4. An eye developed the next day, signaling Davina had intensified into a tropical cyclone, or reaching 10-minute winds of at least 120 km/h (75 mph). On March 7, Davina became an intense tropical cyclone, with sustained 10-minute winds of 165 km/h (105 mph). At around the same time, the JTWC estimated peak 1-minute winds of 205 km/h (125 mph).

Continuing quickly to the west-southwest, Davina moved over an area of cooler waters and began weakening. On March 8, the system passed about 140 km (87 mi) northwest of Rodrigues as a minimal tropical cyclone. The next day, Davina re-intensified slightly to winds of 130 km/h (80 mph), and while near that intensity its eyewall crossed over Mauritius. After passing the island, the eye increased to a diameter of 50 km (31 mi) before deteriorating. On March 10, Davina passed about 35 km (22 mi) southeast of Réunion as a severe tropical storm. The next day, the storm slowed its forward motion and rapidly weakened due to increasing wind shear, becoming a tropical depression on March 12. The circulation turned to the northeast and later to the west in the trade winds. Davina looped off the east coast of Madagascar, eventually dissipating on March 19.

Cyclone Davina affected Rodrigues as a weakening storm, which limited wind gusts to 137 km/h (85 mph) and rainfall to only 40 mm (1.6 in). After moving toward Mauritius for several days, the cyclone produced a peak wave height of 7.73 m (25.4 ft). On the island, the airport at Plaisance recorded a peak gust of 169 km/h (105 mph), strong enough to cause crop damage and injure 60 people. Rainfall peaked at 227 mm (8.9 in), which failed to break the island's worst drought since 1904. On Réunion, wind gusts also peaked at 169 km/h (105 mph) at Piton Sainte-Rose. Davina produced wave heights of 8.84 m (29.0 ft) at Saint-Pierre. Rainfall on Réunion was highest in the southern portion of the island, mainly through the process of orographic lift; over a three-hour period, 180 mm (7.1 in) of precipitation was recorded at Piton de la Fournaise, and the highest total was 1,200 mm (47 in) in the island's center. Due to the storm's slow movement, Davina produced scattered rainfall over Réunion for several days. Two people drowned in the Rivière des Galets, but otherwise the rainfall proved beneficial in alleviating dry conditions. The gusty winds damaged the sugar cane and banana crops, but overall damage was minor.

=== Tropical Depression E3 ===
- Tropical depression (MFR)
- Tropical storm (SSHWS)
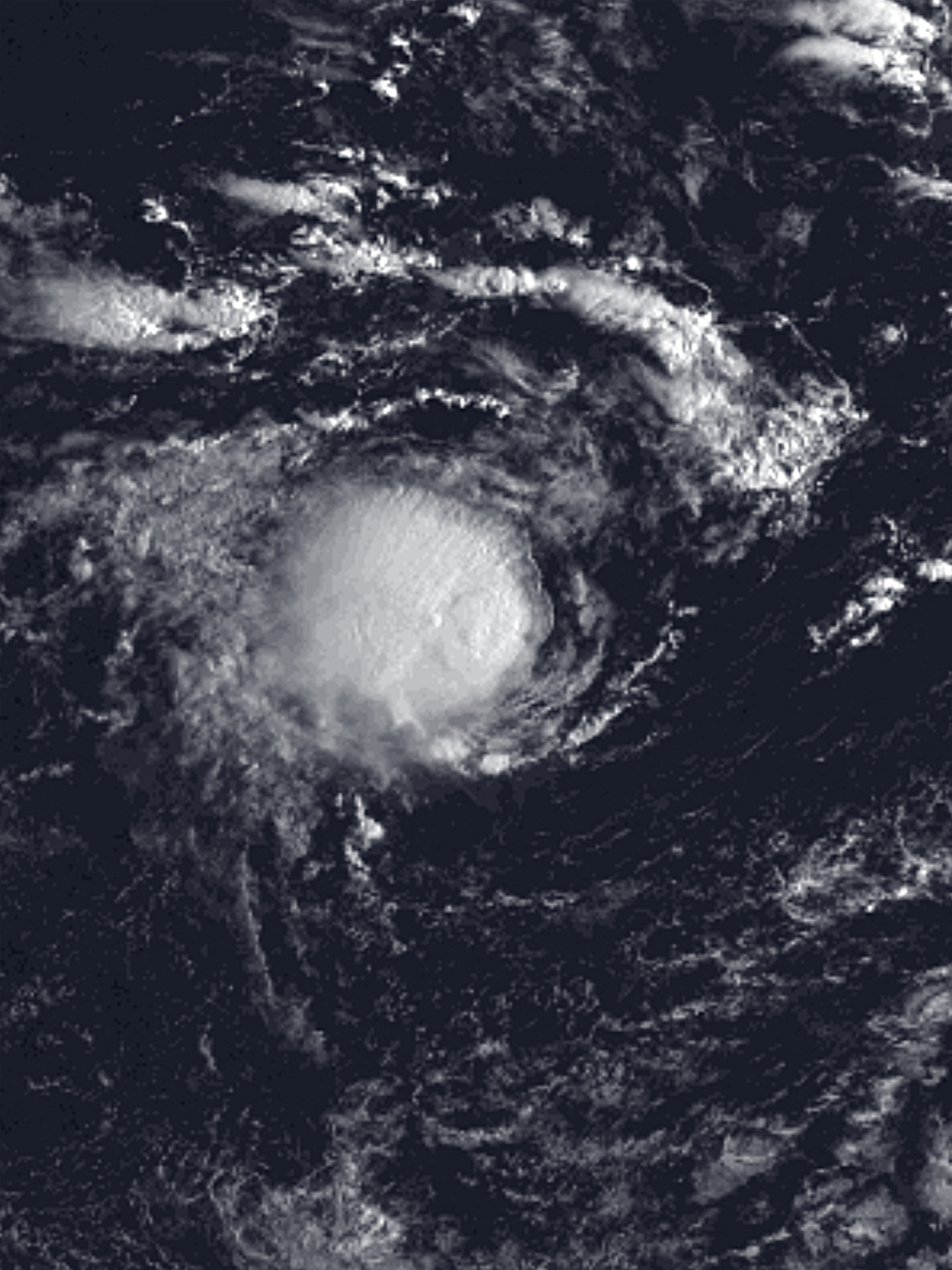
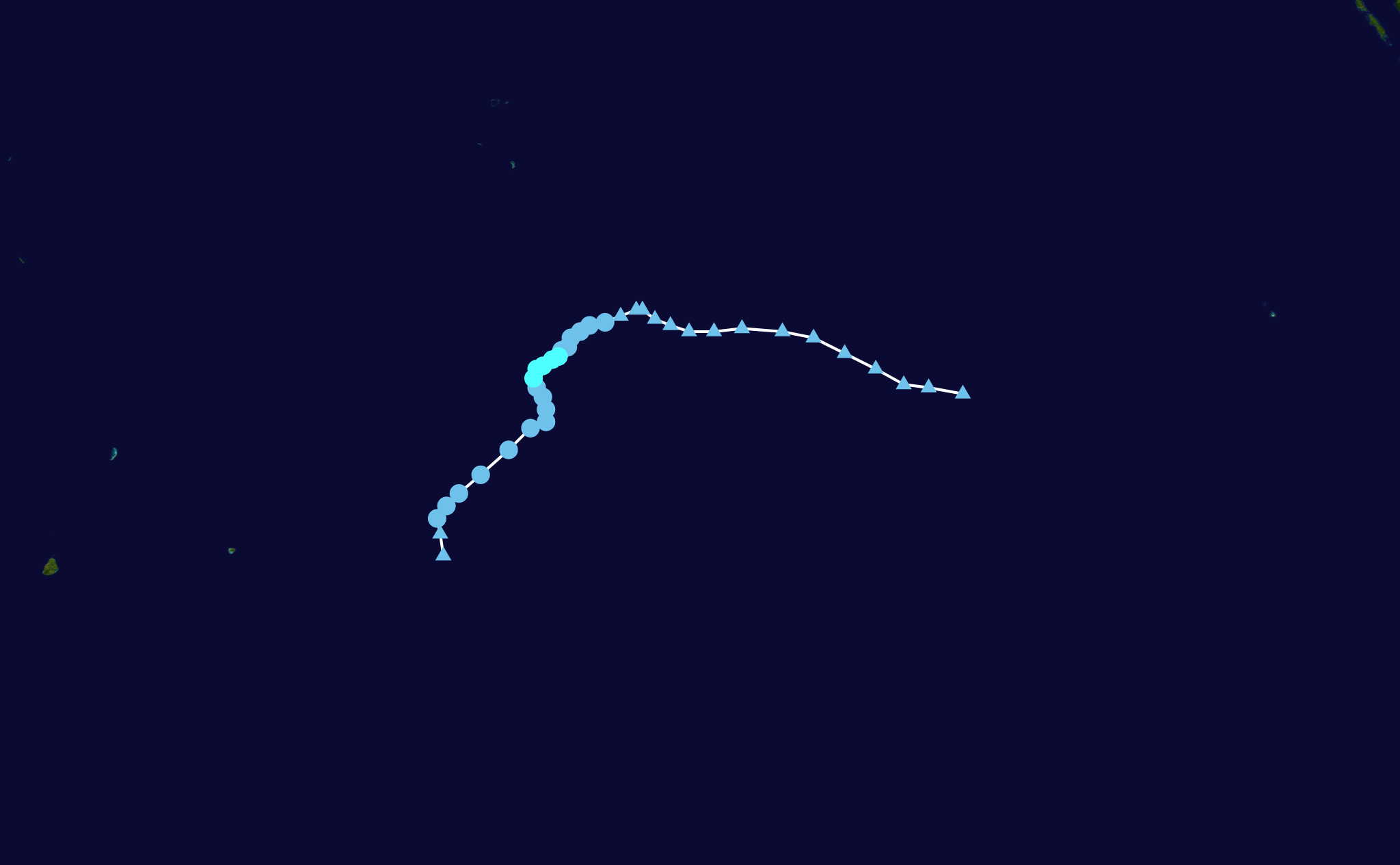
- Duration: March 11 – March 21
- Peak intensity: 55 km/h (35 mph) (10-min); 995 hPa (mbar)

Another tropical disturbance, named E3, formed on March 11 in the eastern portion of the basin. It initially failed to develop more, but after an increase in convection, the system intensified into a tropical depression on March 14 while moving generally west-northwestward. On the next day, the system began drifting to the southwest due to weak steering currents. On March 16, the JTWC initiated advisories on the system as Tropical Cyclone 29S, briefly upgrading it to tropical storm status on the next day. On March 18, the depression began weakening, dissipating three days later.

=== Intense Tropical Cyclone Frederic–Evrina ===
- Intense tropical cyclone (MFR)
- Category 4 tropical cyclone (SSHWS)
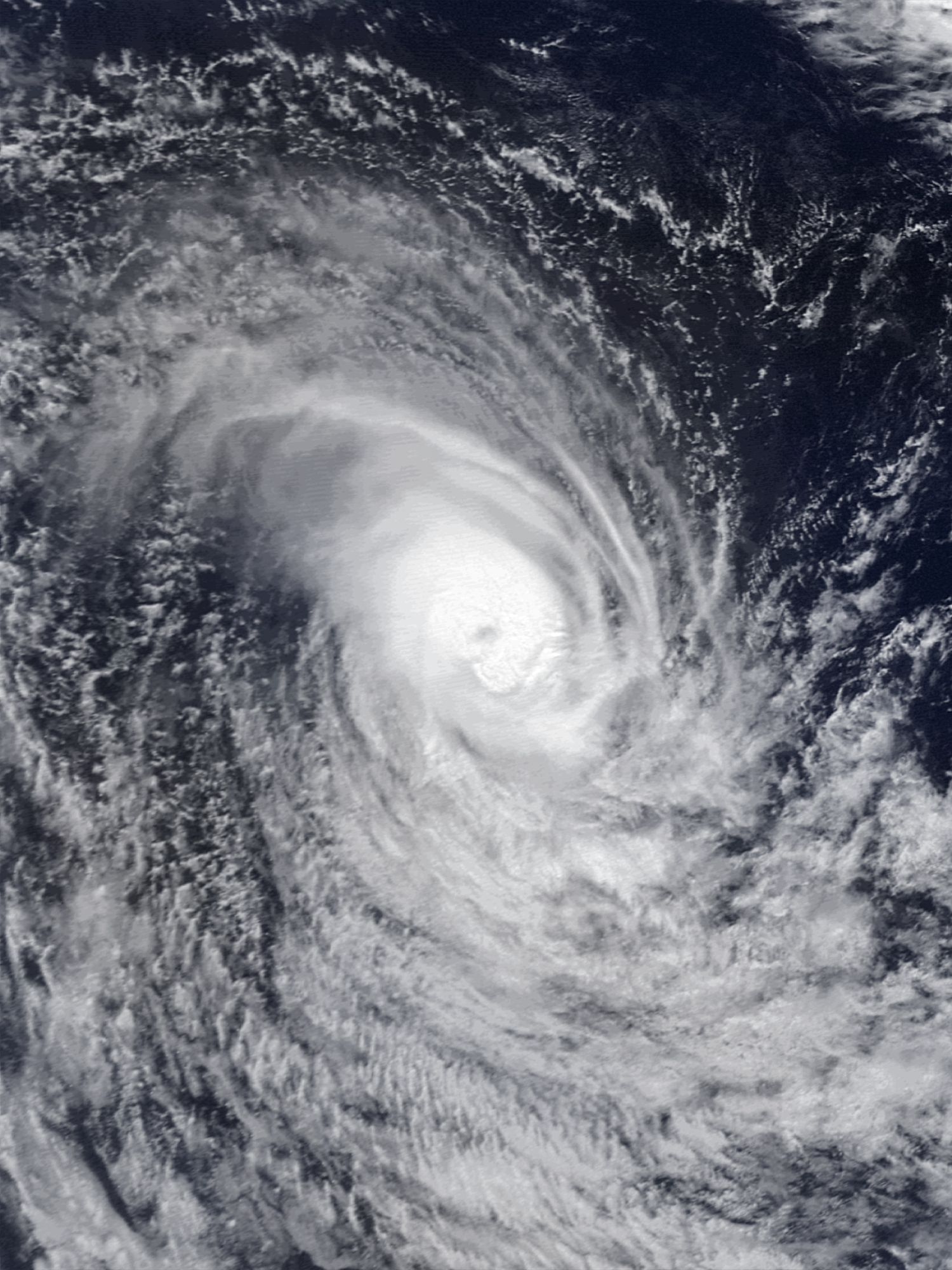
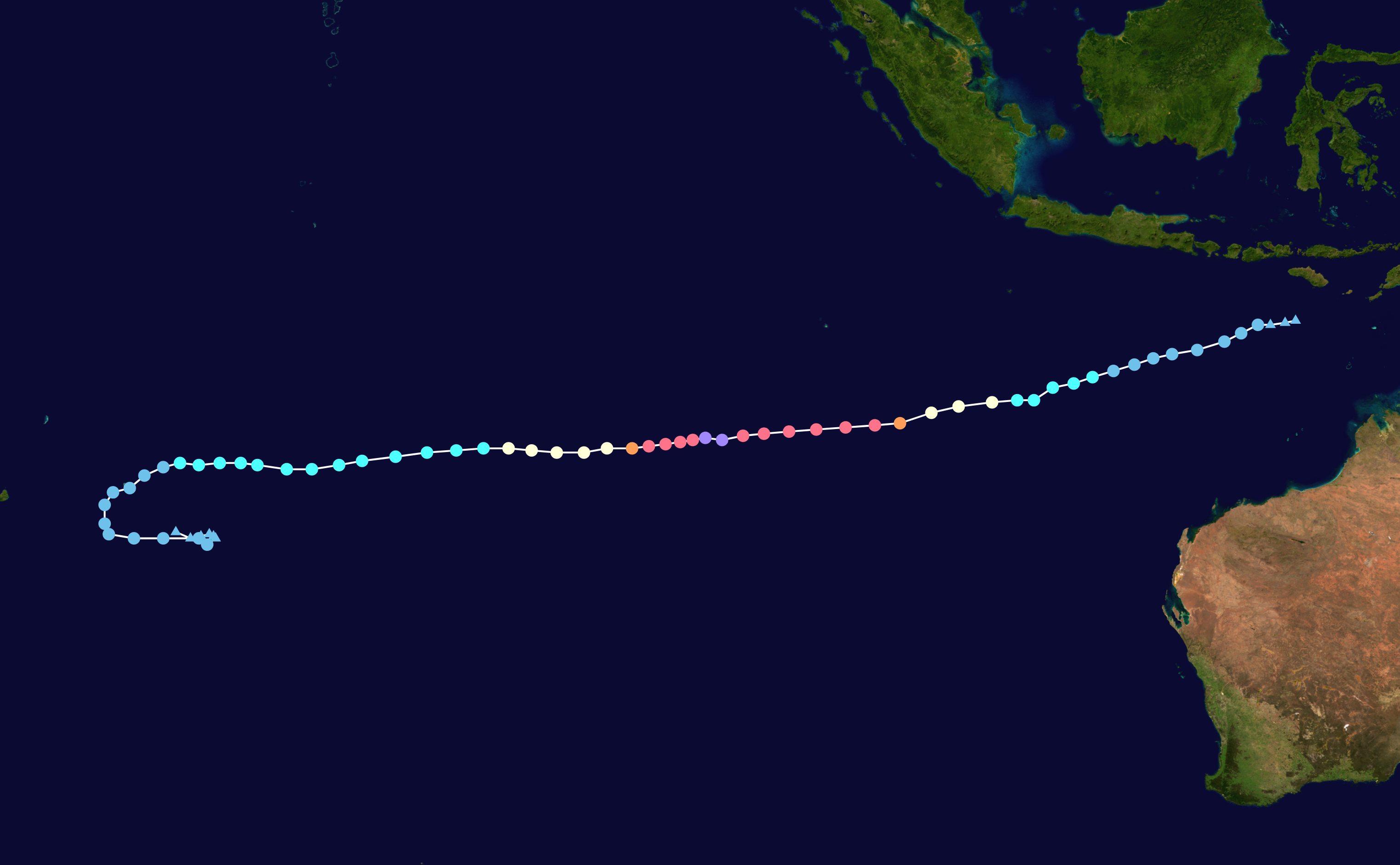
- Duration: April 1 (entered basin) – April 10
- Peak intensity: 175 km/h (110 mph) (10-min); 925 hPa (mbar)

On March 25, an area of convection formed along the monsoon trough in the Australian basin, gradually organizing into a tropical storm while moving west-southwestward and given the name Frederic. On March 29, the storm attained tropical cyclone status, and continued to strengthen due to warm waters. At its peak on March 31, Frederic developed a well-defined 40 km (25 mi) eye within a circular central dense overcast. The MFR estimated peak 10-minute winds of 195 km/h (120 mph), and the JTWC estimated maximum 1-minute winds of 260 km/h (160 mph), equivalent to a Category 5 on the Saffir–Simpson hurricane wind scale. Subsequently, Frederic encountered the combination of wind shear and cooler, dry air, which caused weakening. On April 1, the cyclone crossed into the south-west Indian Ocean with 10-minute winds of 175 km/h (110 mph), at which time it was renamed Evrina.

Continuing to the west-southwest upon entering the basin, Evrina gradually weakened as the eye gradually dissipated. It soon encountered the same cooler waters of the southern Indian that affected previous storms Chikita and Davina. By April 2, Evrina had weakened below tropical cyclone status, just 30 hours after it was at peak intensity. Around that time, the circulation became exposed from the deepest convection, and the track shifted more to the west. On April 5, Evrina weakened to tropical depression status. Two days later, the system turned toward the south, moving in a circular track around the island of Rodrigues while remaining far enough away not to cause any effects. On April 8, the circulation turned to the east, dissipating two days later to the south of Rodrigues.

=== Moderate Tropical Storm Hamish ===
- Moderate tropical storm (MFR)
- Tropical storm (SSHWS)
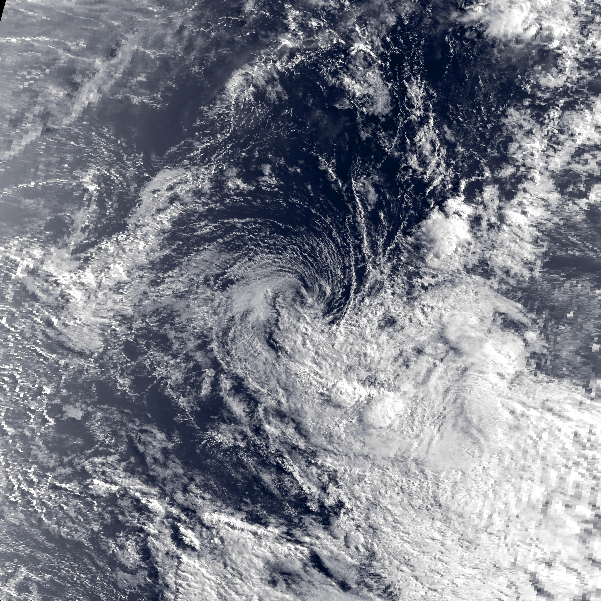
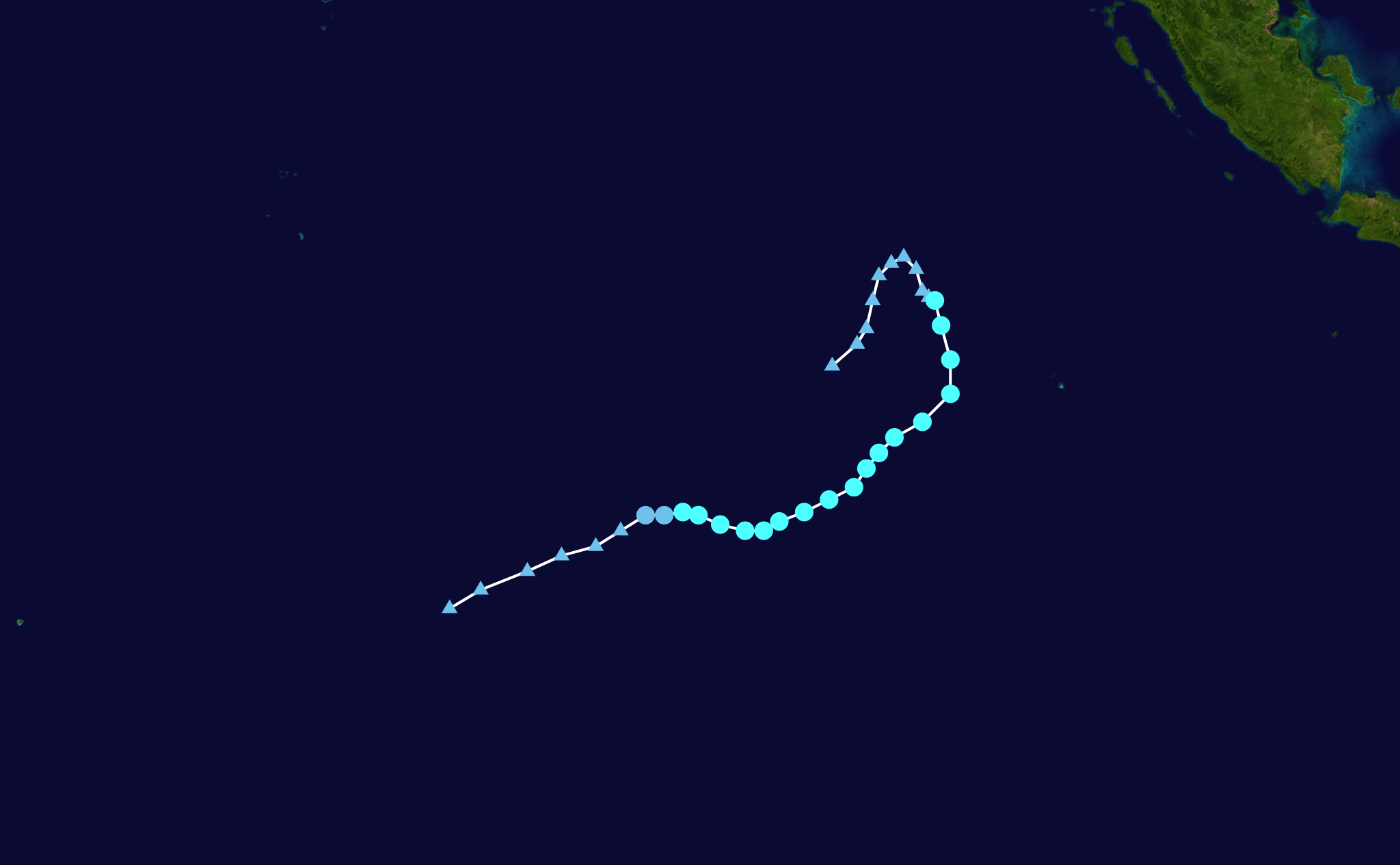
- Duration: April 21 (entered basin) – April 24
- Peak intensity: 65 km/h (40 mph) (10-min); 992 hPa (mbar)

On April 17, an area of convection persisted near the border of the south-west Indian and the Australian regions. The system moved eastward into the Australian basin, becoming a tropical disturbance on April 19. Turning to the southeast, the system gradually organized as the convection persisted. On April 20, the disturbance intensified into a tropical storm and was named Hamish. Shortly thereafter, the ridge to the south turned the storm to the southwest. After the BoM estimated peak winds of 100 km/h (60 mph), Hamish began quickly weakening due to increasing wind shear. On April 21, the storm crossed into the south-west Indian basin, still maintaining 10-minute winds of 65 km/h (40 mph). Although the Mauritius Meteorological Services should have classified the system as Tropical Storm Francine, the storm remained unnamed, referred as Tropical Storm F1. However, the system weakened to tropical depression status within six hours of entering the basin, and dissipating on April 24.

=== Other storms in 1998 ===
At the time, the MFR's cyclone season began on August 1, although the JTWC's cyclone season for the southern hemisphere began on July 1. The latter agency tracked a short-lived tropical storm toward the end of July, classifying it as Tropical Cyclone 01S. The MFR named it Tropical Depression H4, estimating peak 10-minute winds of 55 km/h (35 km/h).

The first system of the season proper originated out of an area of convection in early September in the northeast portion of the basin. On September 3, the MFR initiated advisories on Tropical Disturbance A1 about 1435 km (890 mi) east of Diego Garcia. The system tracked westward, and the JTWC issued a Tropical Cyclone Formation Alert (TCFA) on September 4. Failing to intensify beyond winds of 45 km/h (30 mph), the disturbance dissipated on September 6. Later in the month, Tropical Disturbance A2 formed in a similar region within the monsoon trough, with the MFR initiating advisories on September 29. Also on that day, the JTWC began issuing advisories on Tropical Cyclone 02S. That day, the JTWC upgraded the system to tropical storm status, although strong wind shear prevented intensification. The MFR quickly discontinued advisories, but the JTWC continued tracking it, again upgrading the system to tropical storm status on October 1. After the shear again increased, the storm weakened, dissipating on October 2.

In November, rapidly weakening Tropical Cyclone Alison moved from the Australian basin and dissipated immediately upon entering the south-west Indian Ocean on November 13. On December 4, short-lived Tropical Disturbance A3 was classified by MFR, subsequently drifting into the Australian region. Possibly related to the previous system, Tropical Cyclone Cathy moved from the Australian basin into the basin on December 28, quickly dissipating.

=== Other storms in 1999 ===
On January 1, an area of convection persisted in the Mozambique Channel, with an associated circulation located on land in Mozambique. The system drifted to the east and southeast over warmer waters, gradually organizing. On January 3, the MFR classified the system as Tropical Disturbance A4 near the Mozambique coastline. The disturbance accelerated to the southeast, passing southwest of Madagascar with an asymmetric structure; most of the convection was on the eastern periphery due to strong wind shear. Heavy rainfall occurred along the southwest Madagascar coast, peaking at 322 mm (12.7 in) over a 48‑hour period in Morombe. Wind gusts there reached 180 km/h (110 mph), although the disturbance's maximum sustained 10-minute winds were 55 km/h (35 mph). The disturbance transitioned into a subtropical depression on January 5, but soon after became extratropical while accelerating southeastward.

Similar to the previous depression and Tropical Storm Alda, Tropical Disturbance D2 developed in the Mozambique Channel, initially subtropical in nature. On February 20, a cold front exited the African coast off Mozambique, spawning an area of convection. A weak low-pressure area developed on February 23, which proceeded to move southeastward. Due to unfavorable wind shear, the system failed to organize much, although initially it produced strong wind gusts. On February 28, much of the convection was removed from the circulation, which looped over southwestern Madagascar to turn back to the west. On March 4, when Tropical Storm Davina was named, the disturbance was renamed E1. The next day, the circulation executed a small loop, dissipating on March 6 over eastern Mozambique.

A long-lived system developed on February 28 in the Australian region south of February 28, and moved westward. On March 7, the JTWC initiated advisories on the system as Tropical Cyclone 26S, briefly estimating peak 1-minute winds of 65 km/h (40 mph) the next day. Soon after, the system weakened into a tropical depression, crossing into the south-west Indian Ocean late on March 8. At that time, it was designated Tropical Disturbance E2. Continuing westward along the northern edge of a strong ridge, the disturbance failed to intensify due to easterly wind shear. Although the MFR ceased issuing advisories, they noted that a distinct circulation persisted, reaching a location to the north of Mauritius by March 16. That day, it turned back to the east with a sporadic area of convection, influenced by the larger Tropical Depression E3. Two days later, the system organized enough for the MFR to reclassify it as a tropical disturbance. The system failed to reorganize much, and dissipated on March 20.

== Storm names ==
A tropical disturbance is named when it reaches moderate tropical storm strength. If a tropical disturbance reaches moderate tropical storm status west of 55°E, then the Sub-regional Tropical Cyclone Advisory Centre in Madagascar assigns the appropriate name to the storm. If a tropical disturbance reaches moderate tropical storm status between 55°E and 90°E, then the Sub-regional Tropical Cyclone Advisory Centre in Mauritius assigns the appropriate name to the storm. A new annual list is used every year, and this list was provided by the country of Seychelles.

- Alda
- Birenda
- Chikita
- Davina
- Evrina
- Francine (unused)
- Genila (unused)
- Helvetia (unused)
- Irina (unused)
- Jocyntha (unused)
- Kristina (unused)
- Lina (unused)
- Marsia (unused)
- Naomie (unused)
- Orace (unused)
- Patricia (unused)
- Rita (unused)
- Shirley (unused)
- Tina (unused)
- Veronique (unused)
- Wilvenia (unused)
- Yastride (unused)

== Season effects ==
| Name | Dates | Peak intensity | | | Areas affected | Damage (USD) | Deaths | Ref(s). |
| Name | Dates | Category | Wind speed | Pressure | Areas affected | Damage (USD) | Deaths | Ref(s). |
|---|---|---|---|---|---|---|---|---|
| H4 | July 20–25 | Tropical Depression | 55 km/h (35 mph) | 998 hPa (29.47 inHg) | None | None | None | |
| A1 | September 3–6 | Tropical Disturbance | 45 km/h (30 mph) | 1,002 hPa (29.59 inHg) | Diego Garcia | None | None | |
| A2 | September 29 – October 2 | Tropical Disturbance | 45 km/h (30 mph) | 1,002 hPa (29.59 inHg) | Diego Garcia | None | None | |
| A3 | December 4 | Tropical Disturbance | Unknown | Unknown | Unknown | None | None | |
| A4 | January 3–5 | Tropical Depression | 55 km/h (35 mph) | 996 hPa (29.41 inHg) | | None | None | |
| Alda | January 14–19 | Severe tropical storm | 105 km/h (65 mph) | 975 hPa (28.79 inHg) | | None | None | |
| Damien-Birenda | January 28 – February 2 | Moderate tropical storm | 65 km/h (40 mph) | 992 hPa (29.29 inHg) | | None | None | |
Season aggregates

== See also ==
- List of Southern Hemisphere tropical cyclone seasons
- Atlantic hurricane seasons: 1998, 1999
- Pacific hurricane seasons: 1998, 1999
- Pacific typhoon seasons: 1998, 1999
- North Indian Ocean cyclone seasons: 1998, 1999
