= RIMS Warren Hastings =

Royal Indian Marine troopship

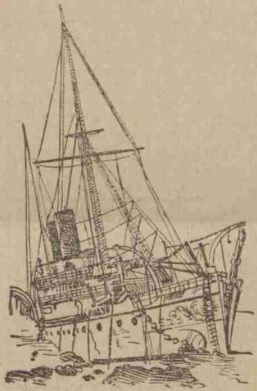
- A sketch depicting the wreck of the RIMS Warren Hastings, published by the Dundee Courier on 24 March 1897.

History

Royal Navy
- Name: Warren Hastings
- Builder: Barrow Shipbuilding Company
- Launched: 18 April 1893
- Completed: 1893
- Fate: Hit a rock and was wrecked on 14 January 1897

General characteristics
- Type: Troopship
- Displacement: 5,000 long tons (5,100 t)
- Length: 330 ft (100 m)
- Beam: 49 ft 3 in (15.01 m)
- Propulsion: Eight boilers and two triple-expansion engines
- Speed: 18 knots (33 km/h; 21 mph)
- Armament: Six quick firing guns, six three pounder guns, and four five barreled guns

RIMS Warren Hastings was a Royal Indian Marine troopship built by the Barrow Shipbuilding Company. She was launched on 18 April 1893, and claimed to be "practically unsinkable" because of her 33 watertight compartments. However, whilst in service the ship struck a rock and was wrecked off the coast of Réunion on the night of 14 January 1897, while travelling to Mauritius from Cape Town. The wreck resulted in two deaths.

== Features ==
Warren Hastings was completed by the Barrow Shipbuilding Company in 1893. Sir Edward Reed oversaw the design and construction, and she was named by Lady Agnes Burne. She was launched on 18 April of that year. Contemporary media claimed her to be "practically unsinkable" because of her 33 watertight compartments. The launch was accompanied by a luncheon where several distinguished persons were present. The ship was 330 ft (100 m) long, with a beam of 49 ft 3 in (15.01 m), and 36 ft 9 in (11.20 m) moulded depth. She displaced around 5,000 long tons (5,100 t), was propelled by two triple-expansion engines capable of producing 3,500 horsepower (2,600 kW), which were supplied by eight boilers, and had a coal capacity of 700 long tons (710 t). She attained a maximum speed of 18 knots (33 km/h; 21 mph).

The hull of the ship was steel, and the woodwork teak, so that she would be fit for tropical environments. She was outfitted with six quick firing guns, six three pounder guns, and four five barreled guns. The ship's internal spaces had electric lights.

== Final voyage ==
=== Background ===
On 20 November 1896, the 1st Battalion of the King's Royal Rifle Corps, stationed at Jullundur, was ordered to go to Mauritius. The battalion set sail on 30 November 1896. They passed through Deolali, and boarded Warren Hastings in Bombay. The ship, captained by Gerald Edward Holland, left Bombay on 10 December. The ship was to stop in Cape Town, and continue to Mauritius from there. After a brief stop for coaling in Seychelles, the ship arrived in Cape Town on 28 December.

=== Wreck ===
Location of Réunion

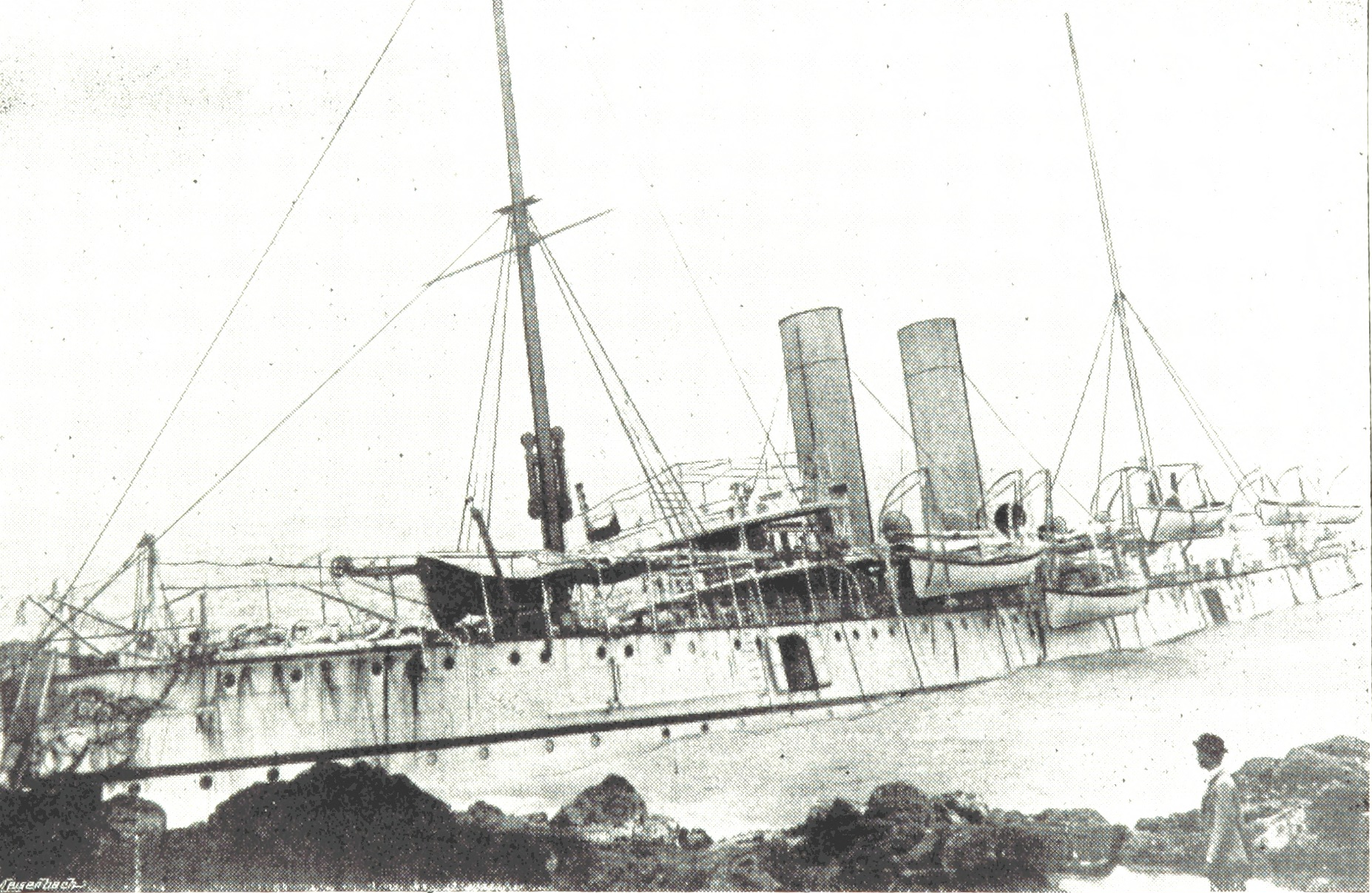
RIMS Warren Hastings ashore Saint-Philippe, Réunion Island

On 6 January 1897, Warren Hastings departed from Cape Town, bound for Mauritius. On board were 526 members of the King's Royal Rifle Corps, 510 members of the 2nd Battalion, York and Lancaster Regiment, and 25 members of the 2nd Middlesex Regiment, including two officers, 20 women, 10 children, and 253 crew members, totaling 1,244 people.

On 13 January, the ship steamed into heavy rain and thick fog. At 02:20 on 14 January, Warren Hastings struck a rock off the coast of Réunion. At the time of impact, the ship was traveling at a speed of 12.5 knots (23.2 km/h; 14.4 mph), and had veered 8 miles (13 km) off course. The wreck itself was caused by the decreased visibility resulting from the foul weather, and by a "magnetic disturbance", which caused the compass to malfunction.

Lieutenant-Colonel Forestier-Walker went to the bridge and asked Captain Holland for orders. The possibility of landing the troops and crew on the rocks was considered, and at 03:25, the captain sent two officers, Lieutenants Dobbin and Windham, over the bow on ropes to inspect the safety of the rocks, equipped with blue lights. The lieutenants determined that the rocks were safe, and Captain Holland ordered the evacuation of the ship to begin at 04:00; the men began climbing down the rope ladders. Originally, the captain wanted to keep the women and children on board until daylight, when it would be safer to evacuate them, but the ship started to list severely at 04:20, and it was decided that the evacuation should continue without delay. The electrical systems on the ship failed at 04:35, after which the evacuation was forced to continue in complete darkness. Around 05:00, the better swimmers were permitted to jump overboard and swim to shore on their own; the shore was around 30 yards (27 m) away. A member of the Rifle Corps, Private N. McNamara, strung a line between the ship and the shore, and heavier ropes were subsequently set up. The remaining men could go down the rope, making the evacuation safer. The ship was completely evacuated by 05:30. Two people died during the evacuation.

=== Aftermath ===
Soon after the wreck, when the rain had subsided, Captain Holland sent members of the Rifle Corps and the York and Lancaster Regiment to retrieve some baggage from the ship, which was stuck on the rocks and had not sunk. The operation was called off at 10:00, when First Lieutenant St. John decided that the wreck was too dangerous. The baggage that had been recovered was taken to shore.

After this, the troops went to the nearby village of Saint-Philippe, where they stayed overnight and received assistance from the townspeople. Captain Holland contacted C. W. Bennett, the British Consul at Saint-Denis, and they secured passage to Mauritius on the SS Lalpoora, located at Pointe des Galets. After brief stops in Saint-Joseph and St. Pierre, the troops were transported to Pointe des Galets by train. The Lalpoora left Réunion on the mid-afternoon of 17 January, and they arrived in Mauritius early the next morning. The officers of Warren Hastings were praised for the discipline and bravery of the troops involved in the evacuation. However, Captain Holland had to face a court martial for losing the ship; he was reprimanded and subsequently acquitted.
