= Ravine d'Ango =

Village on Réunion

- Village
- Location within Réunion
- Coordinates: 21°21′9″S 55°47′17″E
- Country: France (territory)
- Island: Réunion
- Commune: Saint-Philippe

Ravine d'Ango is a village on the island of Réunion, located on its southeastern coast in the commune of Saint-Philippe.
