= Sainte-Anne, Réunion =

Coordinates: 21.0865°S 55.7459°E

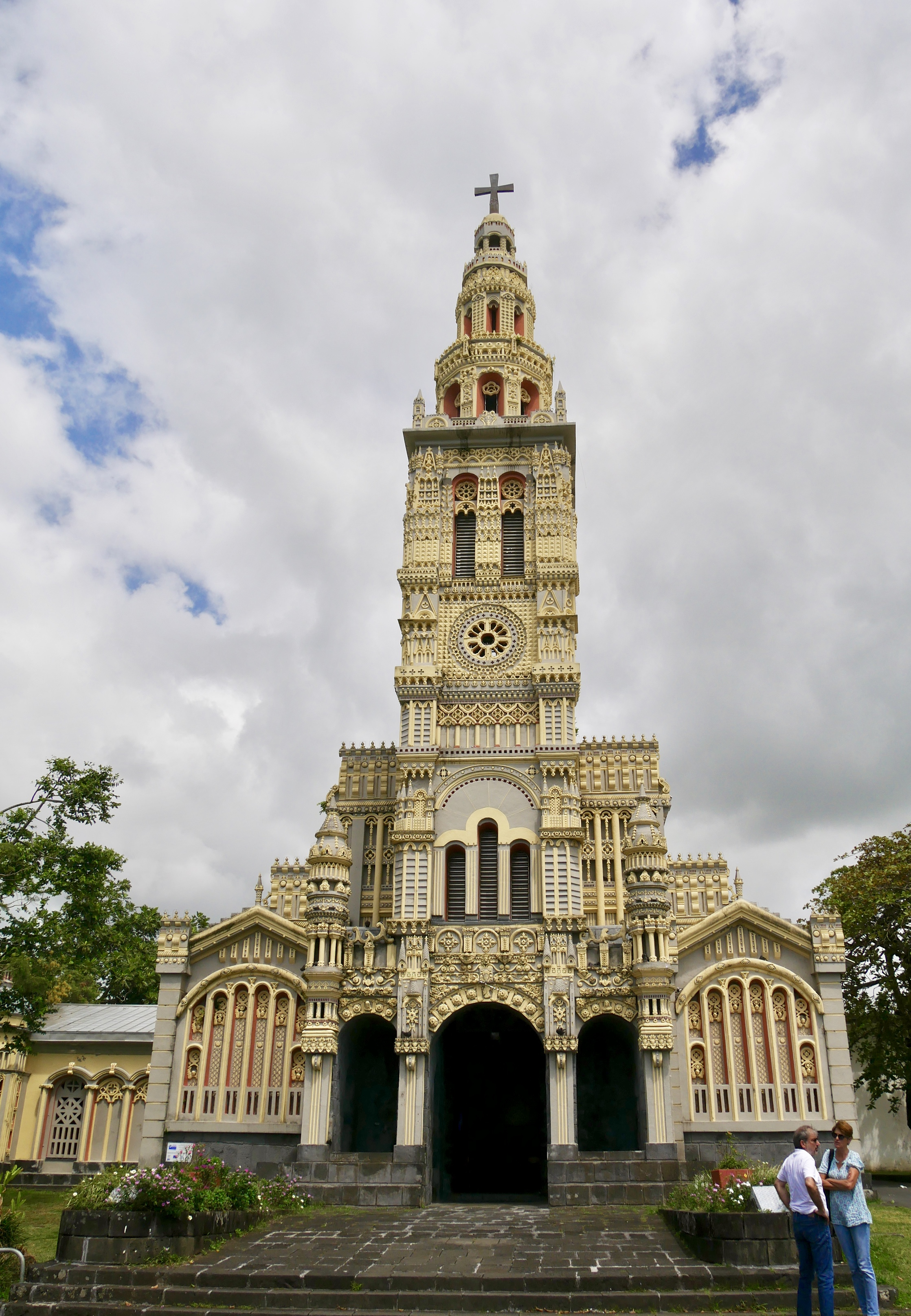
Church of Sainte Anne in Sainte-Anne, Réunion

Sainte-Anne is a small village on the Indian Ocean island of Réunion. It is located on the east coast between the towns of Sainte-Rose and Saint-Benoît.
