= Piton Sainte-Rose =

Village on the French island Réunion

Coordinates: 21°9′23″S 55°49′24″E

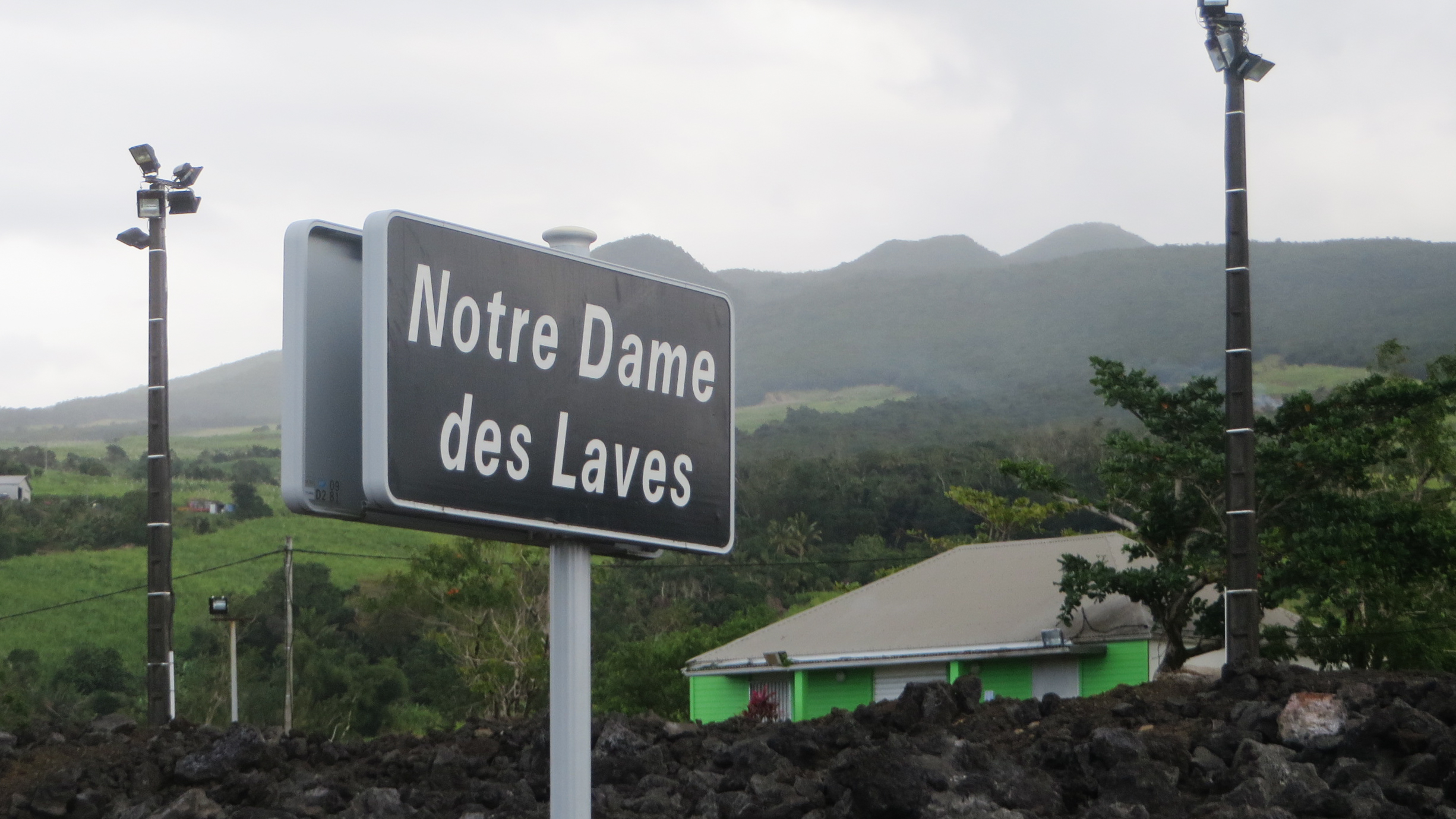
Sign for the church Notre-Dame-des-Laves

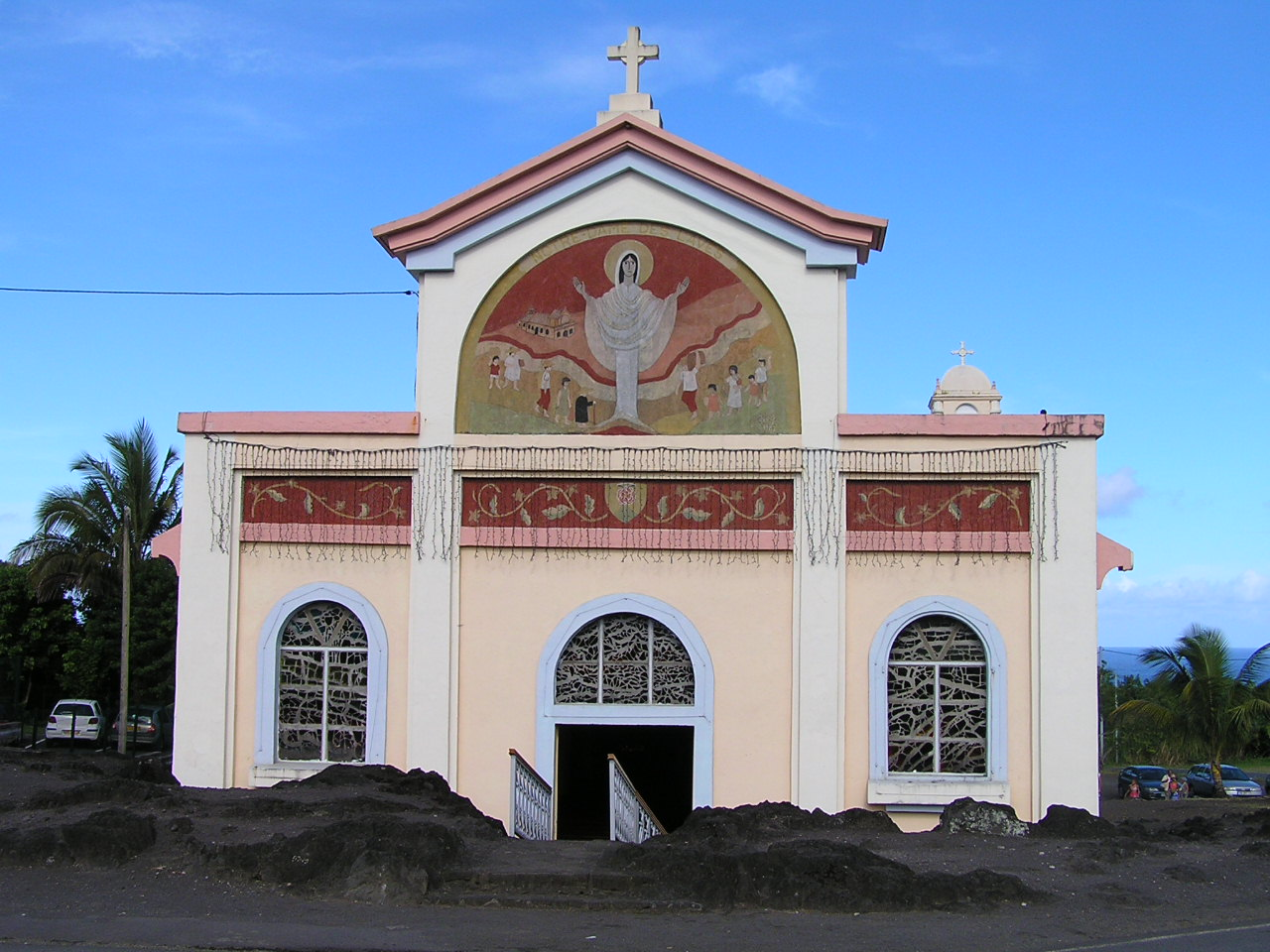
Church Notre-Dame-des-Laves (Our Lady of the Lava), Piton Sainte-Rose, 2006.

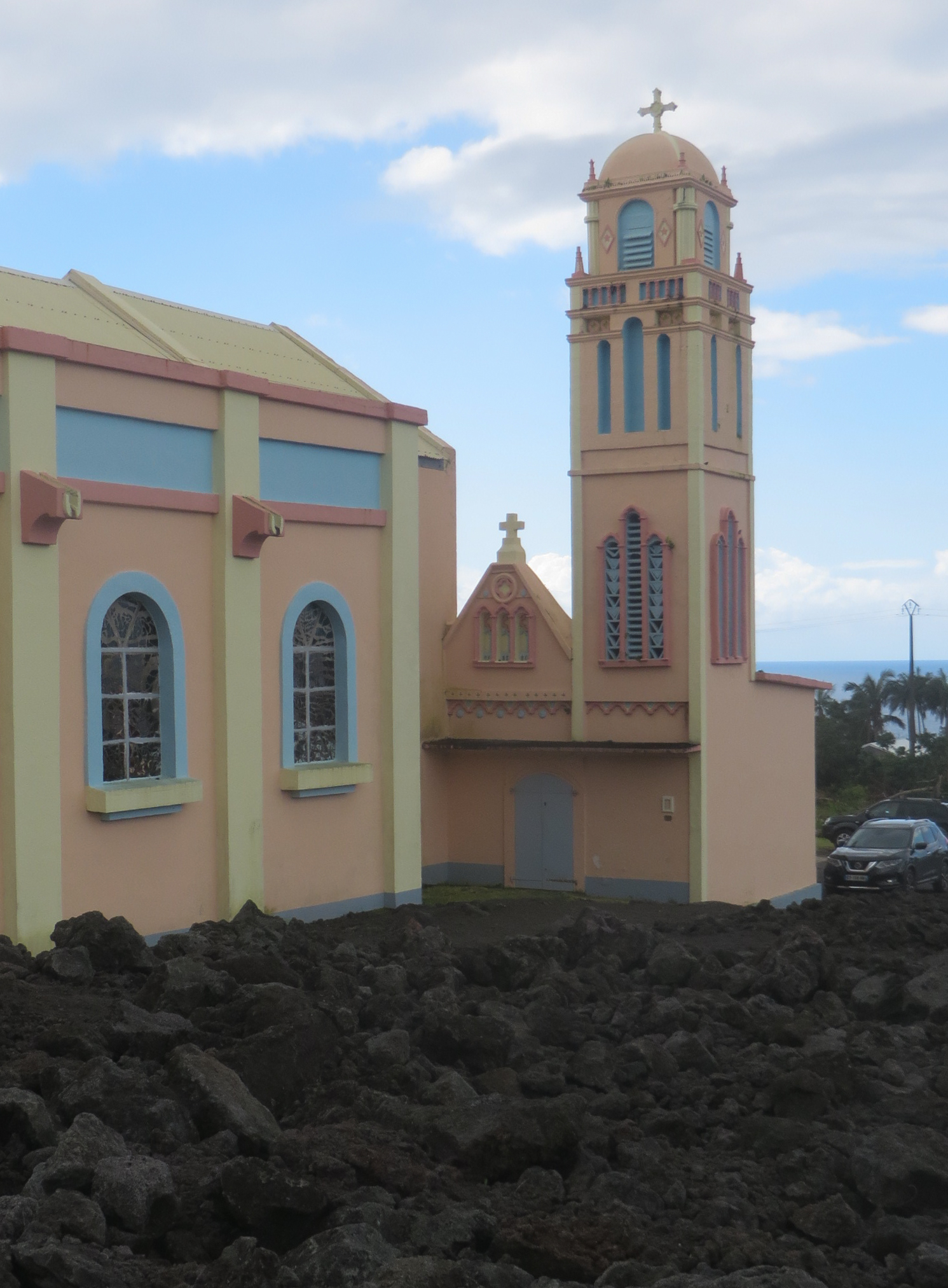
Church Notre-Dame-des-Laves

Piton Sainte-Rose is a village located on the eastern coast of the French island and department of Réunion in the Indian Ocean. It is part of the commune of Sainte-Rose.

== History ==
In April 1977, Piton Sainte-Rose was devastated by a lava flow from the Piton de la Fournaise, the active volcano of the island. The village church was partly invaded by the lava flow but not destroyed. The church was subsequently restored and renamed Notre Dame des Laves (Our Lady of the Lava). It is used for Catholic services.
