= Sainte-Rose, Réunion =

Commune in Réunion, France

Sainte-Rose
- Commune
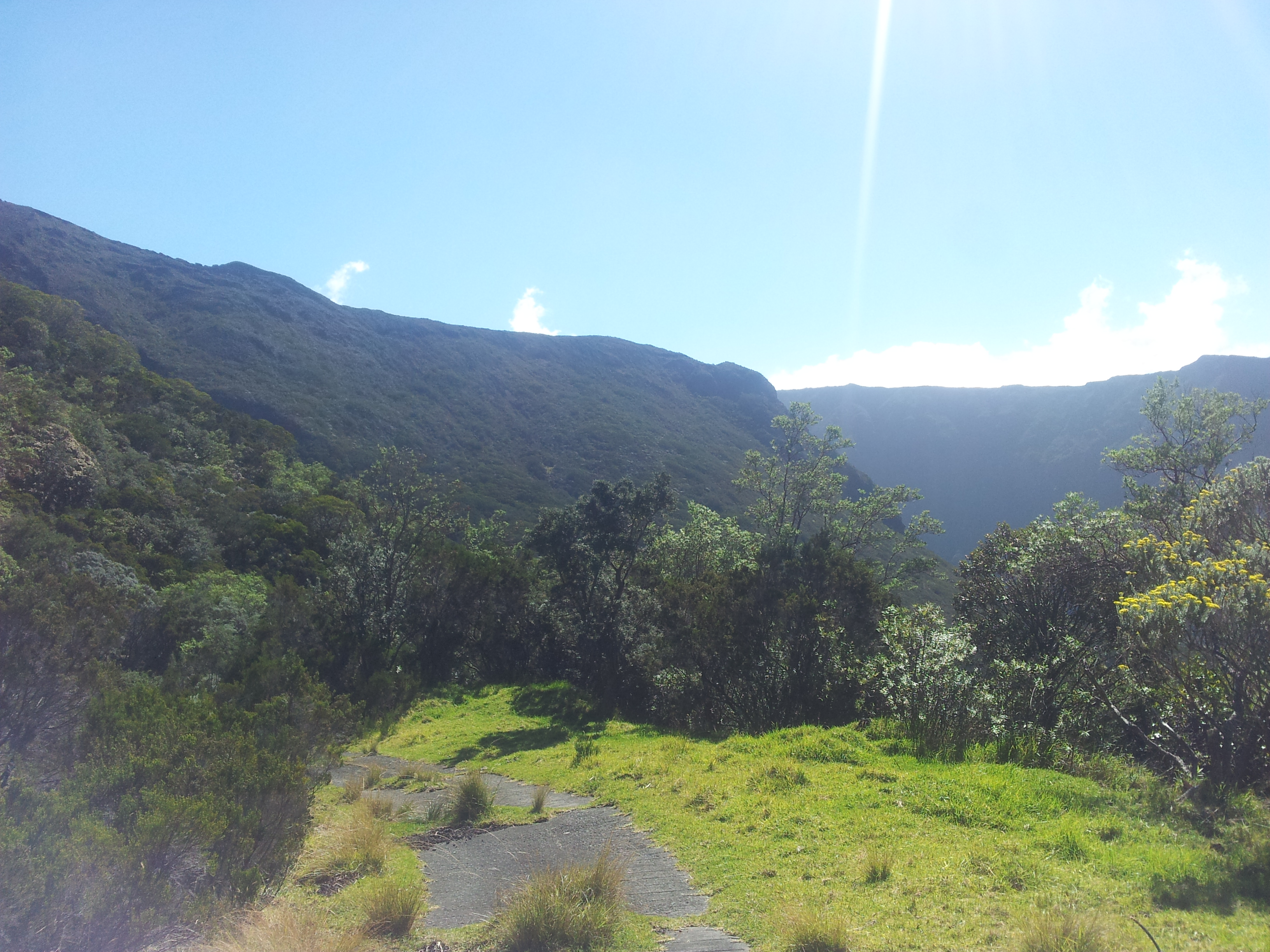

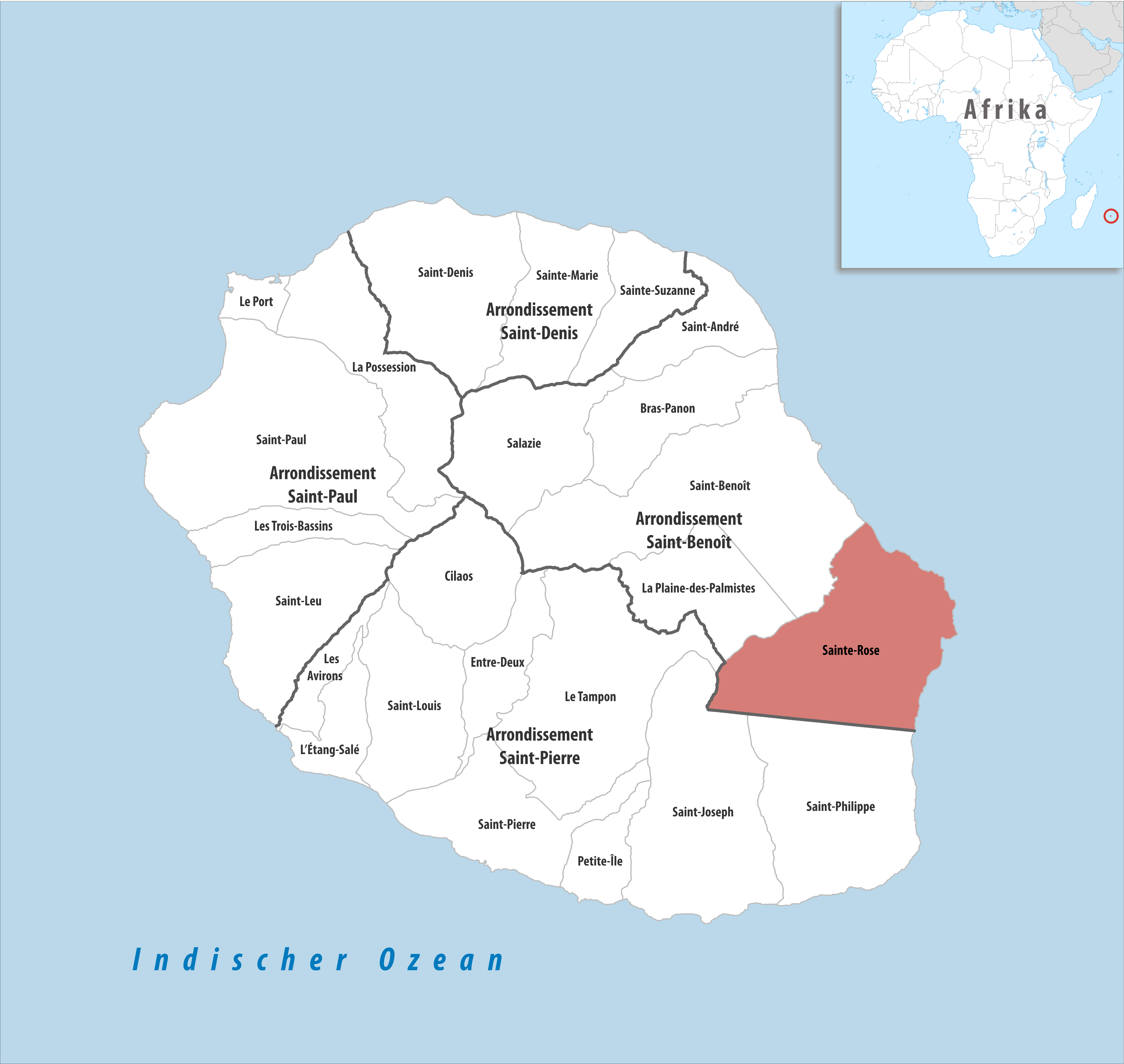
- Location of Sainte-Rose
- Coordinates: 21°07′38″S 55°47′32″E
- Country: France
- Overseas region and department: Réunion
- Arrondissement: Saint-Benoît
- Canton: Saint-Benoît-2
- Intercommunality: Réunion Est

Government
  - Mayor (2020–2026): Michel Vergoz
- Area^{1}: 177.60 km^{2} (68.57 sq mi)
- Elevation: 29 m (95 ft)
- Highest elevation: 2,623 m (8,606 ft)
- Lowest elevation: 0 m (0 ft)
- Population (2023): 6,557
  - Density: 36.92/km^{2} (95.62/sq mi)
- Time zone: UTC+04:00
- INSEE/Postal code: 97419 /97439
- ^{1} French Land Register data, which excludes lakes, ponds, glaciers > 1 km^{2} (0.386 sq mi or 247 acres) and river estuaries.

Sainte-Rose (French pronunciation: [sɛ̃t ʁoz]) is a commune in the east of the French island and department of Réunion.

== Geography ==
The commune is bordered by the communes of La Plaine-des-Palmistes, Saint-Benoît, Saint-Joseph, Saint-Philippe and Tampon; and by the Rivière de l'Est to the north. Sainte-Rose is home to the first wind farm on the island, built in 2004.

The "Pointe des Cascades", in the commune, is the easternmost part of the island and also the easternmost part of France and of the European Union.

=== Climate ===
Sainte-Rose features a tropical rainforest climate (Köppen Af), with substantial rainfall throughout the course of the year. Its location on the eastern side of Réunion, (windward relative to the trade winds), makes it one of the wettest cities in the world, along with Cherrapunji, Quibdó, and López de Micay. At higher altitudes it has an oceanic climate.

Climate data for Sainte-Rose, Réunion
Month	Jan	Feb	Mar	Apr	May	Jun	Jul	Aug	Sep	Oct	Nov	Dec	Year
Mean daily maximum °C (°F)	29.2 (84.6)	29.2 (84.6)	28.7 (83.7)	27.8 (82.0)	26.1 (79.0)	24.5 (76.1)	23.4 (74.1)	23.8 (74.8)	24.7 (76.5)	25.7 (78.3)	27.4 (81.3)	28.6 (83.5)	26.6 (79.9)
Mean daily minimum °C (°F)	22.7 (72.9)	22.8 (73.0)	22.6 (72.7)	21.7 (71.1)	20.3 (68.5)	18.7 (65.7)	17.7 (63.9)	17.7 (63.9)	18.1 (64.6)	19.0 (66.2)	20.7 (69.3)	21.8 (71.2)	20.3 (68.6)
Average precipitation mm (inches)	1,076 (42.4)	1,449 (57.0)	1,252 (49.3)	1,104 (43.5)	919 (36.2)	765 (30.1)	903 (35.6)	740 (29.1)	677 (26.7)	622 (24.5)	580 (22.8)	842 (33.1)	10,929 (430.3)
Source: Atlas climatique de La Réunion

Climate data for Sainte-Rose (Gros Piton, altitude 181m, 1991–2020 normals, extremes 1987–present)
Month	Jan	Feb	Mar	Apr	May	Jun	Jul	Aug	Sep	Oct	Nov	Dec	Year
Record high °C (°F)	34.2 (93.6)	34.2 (93.6)	35.2 (95.4)	32.8 (91.0)	31.8 (89.2)	30.0 (86.0)	29.1 (84.4)	28.3 (82.9)	29.5 (85.1)	33.1 (91.6)	34.1 (93.4)	34.3 (93.7)	35.2 (95.4)
Mean daily maximum °C (°F)	29.5 (85.1)	29.5 (85.1)	29.0 (84.2)	28.1 (82.6)	26.3 (79.3)	24.6 (76.3)	23.7 (74.7)	24.1 (75.4)	25.0 (77.0)	26.1 (79.0)	27.7 (81.9)	29.0 (84.2)	26.9 (80.4)
Daily mean °C (°F)	26.2 (79.2)	26.3 (79.3)	25.9 (78.6)	25.1 (77.2)	23.4 (74.1)	21.8 (71.2)	20.8 (69.4)	21.0 (69.8)	21.7 (71.1)	22.7 (72.9)	24.1 (75.4)	25.5 (77.9)	23.7 (74.7)
Mean daily minimum °C (°F)	22.9 (73.2)	23.0 (73.4)	22.8 (73.0)	21.9 (71.4)	20.5 (68.9)	18.9 (66.0)	18.0 (64.4)	18.0 (64.4)	18.3 (64.9)	19.3 (66.7)	20.6 (69.1)	22.0 (71.6)	20.5 (68.9)
Record low °C (°F)	19.4 (66.9)	19.4 (66.9)	18.8 (65.8)	18.1 (64.6)	16.6 (61.9)	14.3 (57.7)	14.0 (57.2)	13.3 (55.9)	14.1 (57.4)	14.3 (57.7)	15.5 (59.9)	18.9 (66.0)	13.3 (55.9)
Average precipitation mm (inches)	436.3 (17.18)	478.5 (18.84)	541.9 (21.33)	418.4 (16.47)	315.1 (12.41)	256.9 (10.11)	259.5 (10.22)	210.4 (8.28)	171.7 (6.76)	166.0 (6.54)	206.3 (8.12)	311.7 (12.27)	3,772.7 (148.53)
Average precipitation days (≥ 1.0 mm)	20.8	20.5	21.6	21.2	20.1	19.2	22.5	18.9	16.2	16.0	13.9	17.8	228.6
Source: Météo-France

Climate data for Sainte-Rose (Bellecombe-Jacob, altitude 2245m, 1991–2020 normals, extremes 1968–present)
Month	Jan	Feb	Mar	Apr	May	Jun	Jul	Aug	Sep	Oct	Nov	Dec	Year
Record high °C (°F)	25.4 (77.7)	24.1 (75.4)	24.2 (75.6)	23.9 (75.0)	22.2 (72.0)	23.1 (73.6)	21.2 (70.2)	23.4 (74.1)	23.0 (73.4)	24.6 (76.3)	25.0 (77.0)	24.7 (76.5)	25.4 (77.7)
Mean daily maximum °C (°F)	18.7 (65.7)	18.6 (65.5)	18.3 (64.9)	17.5 (63.5)	15.5 (59.9)	13.7 (56.7)	12.7 (54.9)	13.5 (56.3)	15.0 (59.0)	17.0 (62.6)	18.2 (64.8)	18.7 (65.7)	16.4 (61.5)
Daily mean °C (°F)	14.2 (57.6)	14.4 (57.9)	13.9 (57.0)	13.0 (55.4)	11.0 (51.8)	9.0 (48.2)	8.1 (46.6)	8.5 (47.3)	9.6 (49.3)	11.4 (52.5)	12.6 (54.7)	13.5 (56.3)	11.6 (52.9)
Mean daily minimum °C (°F)	9.7 (49.5)	10.2 (50.4)	9.6 (49.3)	8.5 (47.3)	6.6 (43.9)	4.4 (39.9)	3.6 (38.5)	3.5 (38.3)	4.2 (39.6)	5.8 (42.4)	7.0 (44.6)	8.4 (47.1)	6.8 (44.2)
Record low °C (°F)	2.2 (36.0)	3.7 (38.7)	3.2 (37.8)	1.0 (33.8)	0.0 (32.0)	−1.8 (28.8)	−3.3 (26.1)	−3.7 (25.3)	−5.0 (23.0)	−1.9 (28.6)	−0.3 (31.5)	1.9 (35.4)	−5.0 (23.0)
Average precipitation mm (inches)	781.1 (30.75)	890.8 (35.07)	899.8 (35.43)	472.3 (18.59)	397.8 (15.66)	234.1 (9.22)	262.8 (10.35)	197.6 (7.78)	137.4 (5.41)	106.1 (4.18)	144.9 (5.70)	358.5 (14.11)	4,883.2 (192.25)
Average precipitation days (≥ 1.0 mm)	19.5	19.3	19.6	18.1	16.6	16.1	17.8	15.5	13.0	10.3	9.9	14.5	190.3
Source: Météo-France

== History ==
The village of Piton Sainte-Rose was partially destroyed by a lava flow in April 1977.

== Population ==
Historical population
Year	Pop.	±% p.a.
1967	4,761	—
1974	4,850	+0.26%
1982	5,265	+1.03%
1990	5,761	+1.13%
1999	6,551	+1.44%
2007	6,680	+0.24%
2012	6,777	+0.29%
2017	6,418	−1.08%
2023	6,557	+0.36%
Source: INSEE

== See also ==
- Communes of the Réunion department
