= Mobile Airport =

Mobile Airport may refer to two airports in Mobile, Alabama:

- Mobile International Airport
- Mobile Regional Airport
