= Airbus Mobile =

Airplane assembly facility in Mobile, Alabama

Airbus U.S. Manufacturing Facility
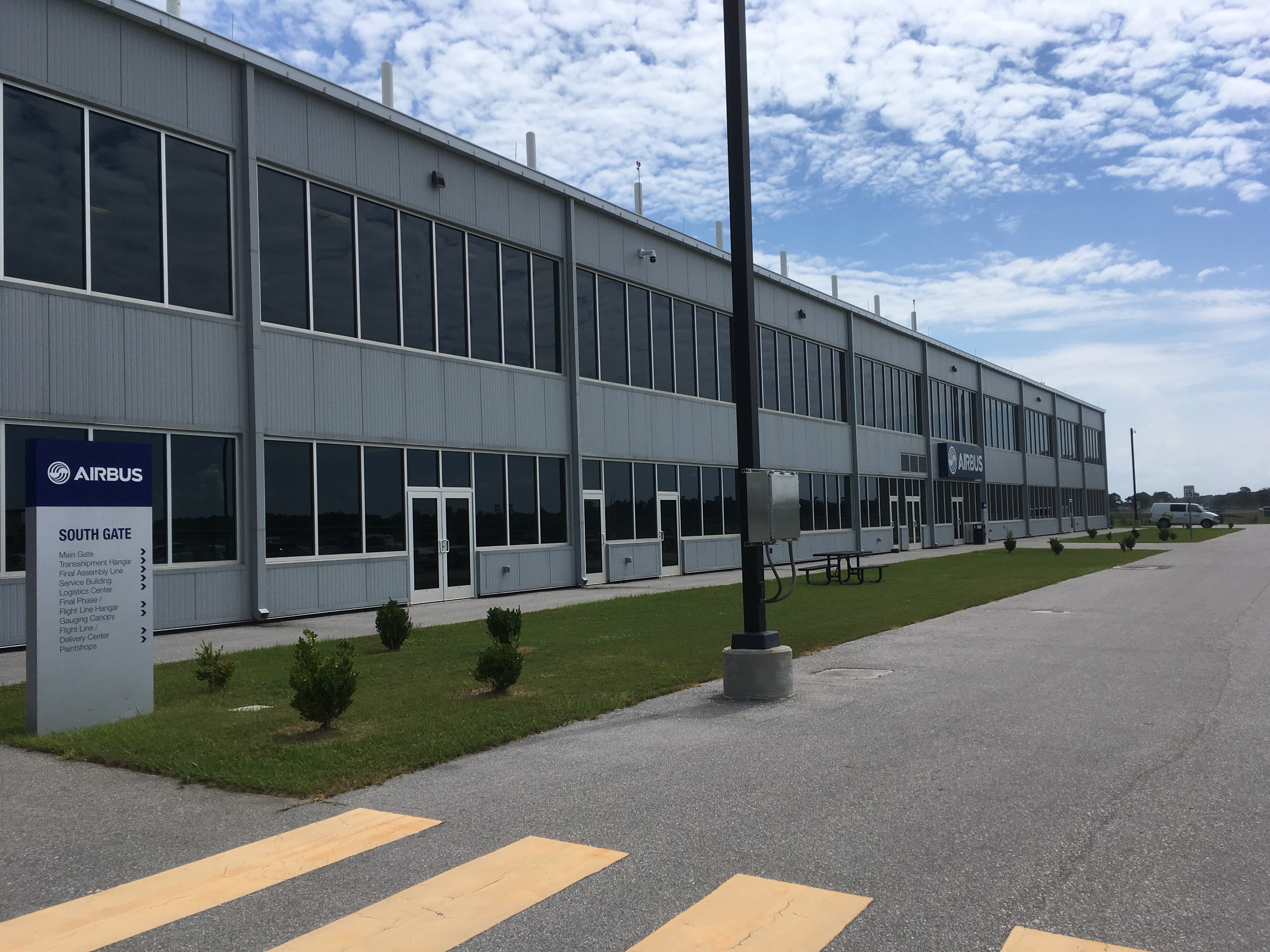
- Office Building at Airbus Mobile in July 2018.
- Built: April 8, 2013
- Operated: September 14, 2015–Present
- Location: airbusalabama.com; 320 Airbus Way Mobile, Alabama United States
- Coordinates: 30°38′04″N 88°04′16″W
- Industry: Aerospace
- Products: Airbus A220; Airbus A320neo family
- Employees: 2,200
- Owner: Airbus

The Airbus U.S. Manufacturing Facility is an assembly site for Airbus's Commercial Airplanes division, located at the Mobile Aeroplex at Brookley in Mobile, Alabama, United States. The plant is an assembly and delivery site for Airbus commercial aircraft in the United States and one of the largest employment centers in the state. The site is one of four final assembly and delivery points for the Airbus A320neo family (Note: The other sites are in Toulouse, France, Hamburg, Germany, and Tianjin, China.) and one of two final assembly and delivery points for the Airbus A220. (Note: The other site is Montreal, Canada.)

== History ==
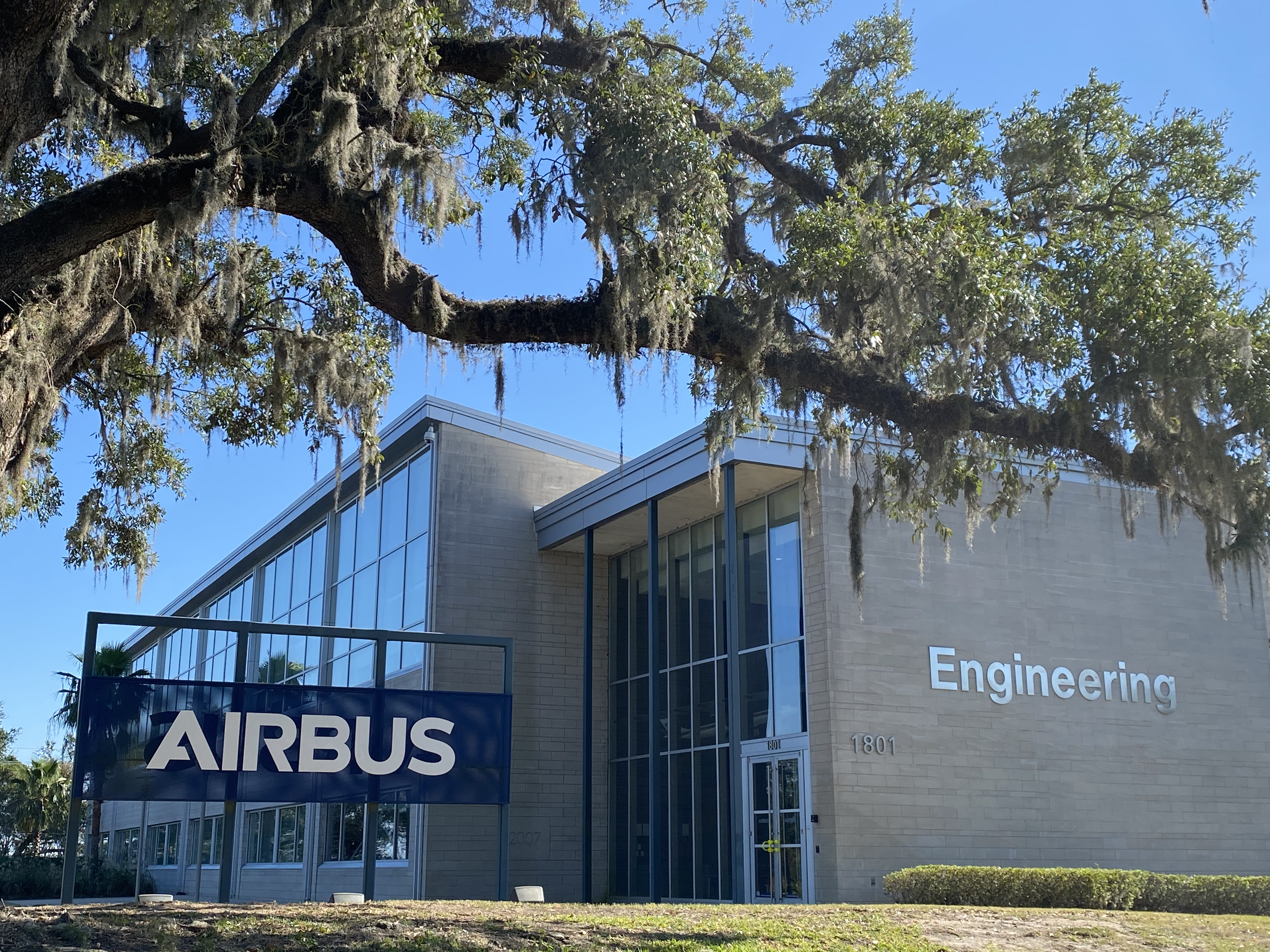
Airbus engineering office in Mobile, Alabama, opened in 2006.

The European Aeronautic Defence and Space Company (EADS), the predecessor to the modern Airbus SE, announced in June 2005 that it selected Mobile, Alabama for an aircraft manufacturing facility. The company felt that a U.S. manufacturing facility would help it better compete for military aircraft contracts. EADS said that it had picked Mobile for its nearby deep-water port off the Gulf of Mexico, an abundance of industrial space available within the Mobile Aeroplex at Brookley, the site of the former Brookley Air Force Base, and access to the uncongested Mobile Downtown Airport. EADS also built an engineering office at the site, which opened in 2006.

In 2008, EADS launched a joint bid with Northrop Grumman to supply aerial refueling tankers to the United States Air Force. As part of the bid, EADS planned to assemble the basic Airbus A330 airframe in Mobile before delivering it to a neighboring facility to be operated by Northrop Grumman, where it would be converted into the KC-45 tanker. EADS also announced plans to have its Airbus subsidiary shift Airbus A330 commercial freighter assembly to Alabama. In total, Northrop Grumman and EADS planned to invest approximately US$600 million in their assembly plants in Alabama. However, EADS and Northrop Grumman lost the contract.

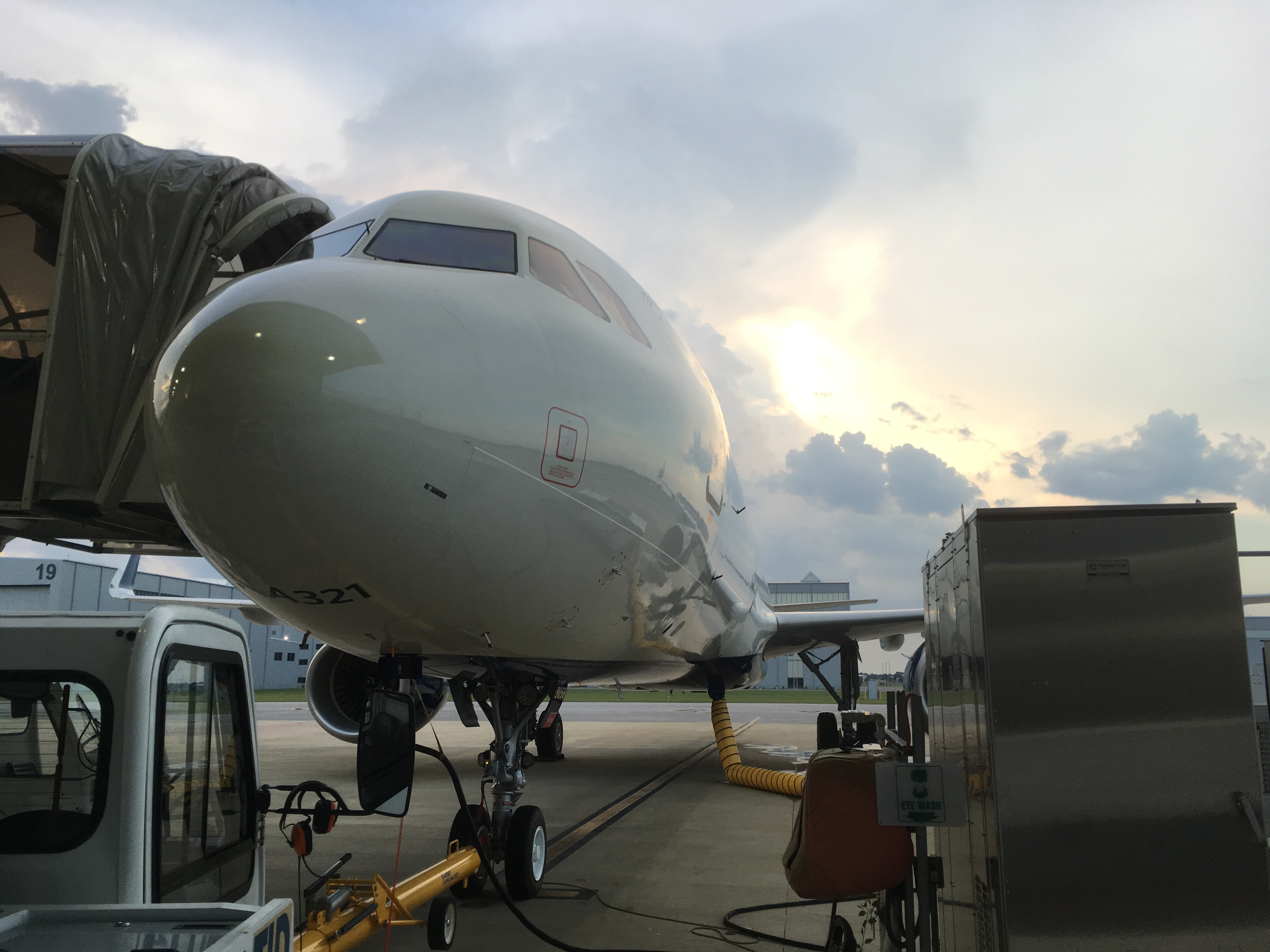
Delta Air Lines A321 at the Mobile delivery facility

However, Airbus remained interested in opening a U.S. manufacturing facility in Mobile. In June 2012, it was announced that Airbus had decided to open the facility to assemble the Airbus A320 family (A319, A320 and A321) of airliners. The announced plans included a $600 million factory at the Brookley Aeroplex for the assembly of the aircraft, employing up to 1,000 full-time workers when at full capacity. Construction was scheduled to begin in 2013, with it becoming operable by 2015 and intending to produce 40 to 50 aircraft per year by 2017. The plan was formally announced by Airbus CEO Fabrice Brégier from the Mobile Convention Center on July 2, 2012. A groundbreaking ceremony for the factory was held on April 8, 2013. On September 14, 2015, Airbus officially opened the Mobile assembly line.

== Aircraft in production ==
=== Airbus A320 ===
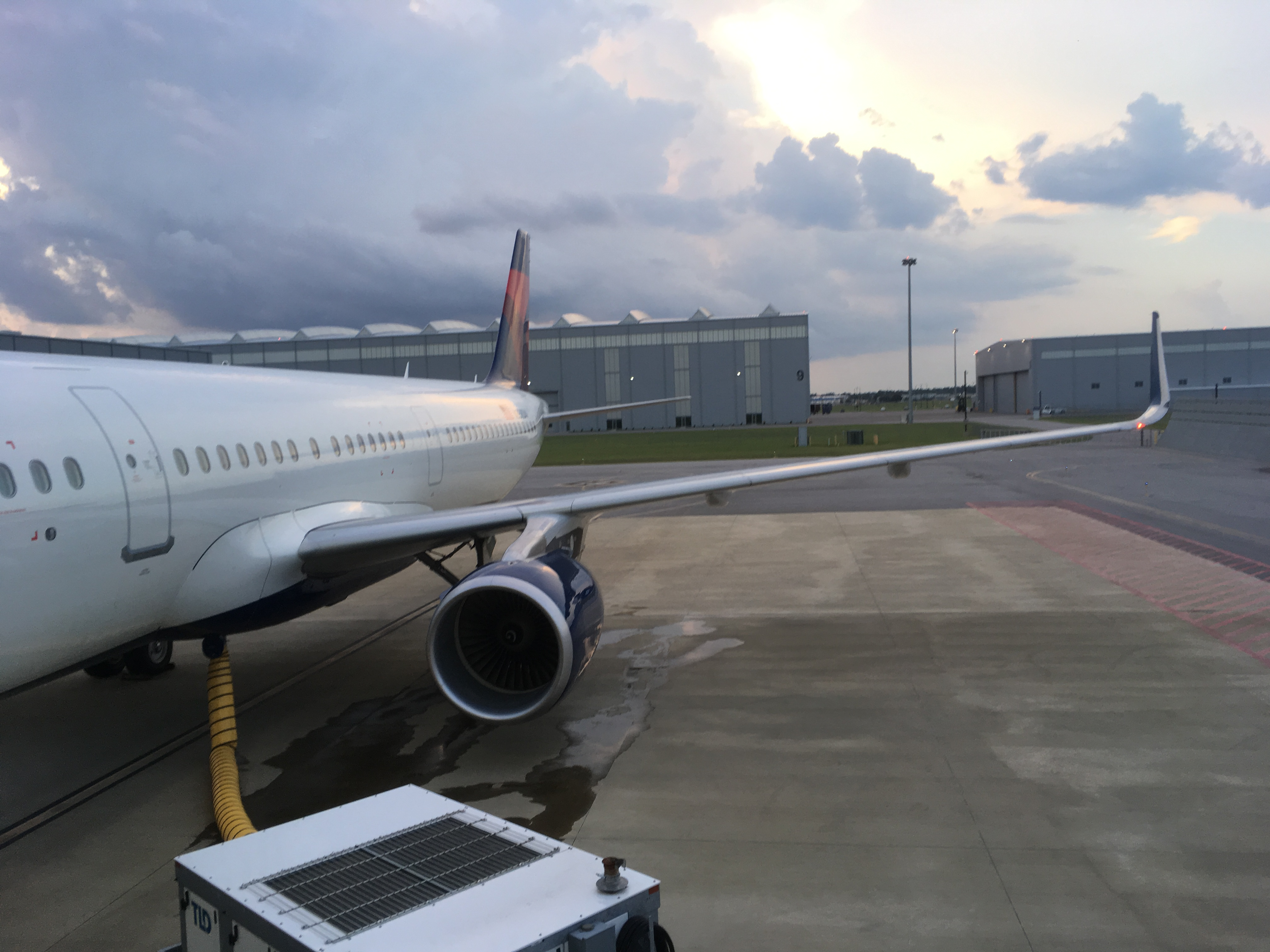
Delta Air Lines A321 with the Mobile Plant in the distance

The Mobile plant is a final assembly site for the Airbus A320neo family of narrow-body aircraft, and previously for the Airbus A320 family. Aircraft assembled in Mobile are delivered primarily to airlines based in North America. On June 21, 2015, the main fuselage components for the first aircraft built at the site arrived at the plant, and the first completed aircraft—an A321—was delivered to JetBlue on April 25, 2016.

Major aircraft components, including the wings and fuselage sections, are manufactured at Airbus facilities across Europe and transported to Saint-Nazaire, France, where four aircraft worth of parts are loaded onto a barge. Following a transatlantic crossing, the parts are unloaded at the Port of Mobile and trucked to the factory for assembly.

As of 2021, the Mobile site had the capacity to assemble seven A320-family aircraft per month, with plans to add a second assembly line to increase output to 20 aircraft per month. The facility was also the final assembly site for the last A320ceo-family aircraft produced, an A321 registered N129DN, which was delivered to Delta Air Lines on December 16, 2021. In October 2025, Airbus opened the second A320neo-family final assembly line at the Mobile facility.

=== Airbus A220 ===
The Mobile plant has also been used as a final assembly line for Airbus A220 narrow-body aircraft since August 2019. The first aircraft from the new line, an A220-300, was delivered to Delta in October 2020. Airbus plans to ramp production in Alabama up to four A220 aircraft each month by 2025.

Airbus acquired a majority stake in the Bombardier CSeries programme in October 2017, renaming the aircraft the A220. While manufacturing of the A220 was already under construction at facilities in the province of Quebec, formerly owned by Bombardier, the aircraft was potentially facing steep tariffs for Canadian-made planes being purchased by U.S. airlines. Airbus announced that to avoid the possible tariffs, it would set up a second assembly line for the A220 at the Airbus Mobile factory. The United States International Trade Commission ruled three months later that the Canadian-made planes did not threaten the U.S. airplane industry and no duty orders would be issued.

== See also ==
- Boeing Renton Factory – A competing narrow-body aircraft manufacturing facility in the United States
