= Mobile Aeroplex at Brookley =

Industrial complex and airport in Alabama, US

- Location: Mobile, Alabama, United States
- Coordinates: 30.64436°N 88.06452°W
- Parent organization: Mobile Airport Authority
- Website: brookleyaeroplex.com
- Formerly called: Bates Field, Brookley Army Air Field, Brookley Air Force Base, Brookley Complex

The Mobile Aeroplex at Brookley is an industrial complex and airport in Mobile, Alabama, United States, which lies adjacent to the western shore of Mobile Bay. It is owned and operated by the Mobile Airport Authority. It was known by a variety of names until being renamed in 2010 as the Brookley Aeroplex. In the fall of 2013, the Brookley Aeroplex was rebranded as the Mobile Aeroplex at Brookley.

== History ==
The aeroplex was first developed specifically for aviation with the establishment of Bates Field in 1929. The City of Mobile acquired the land from then Mayor of Mobile, Cecil F. Bates. Bates Field was Mobile's first municipal airport. The United States Army Air Corps purchased the airfield in 1938 and established the Brookley Army Air Field, later renamed Brookley Air Force Base in 1948. The name Bates Field was then reused for the new Mobile municipal airport located 10 miles (16 km) northwest of the Brookley site, known today as the Mobile Regional Airport. Brookley Army Air Field employed 17,000 civilians during World War II. After the end of the war, Brookley AFB was used by Air Materiel Command. The closure of the base was announced in 1964, with operations officially ceasing in June 1969. This left a civilian workforce of approximately 13,000 people, ten percent of the local workforce, without jobs. It represented the largest base closure in United States history up to that time.

The site was returned to the city after the base closure. The city established the Mobile Airport Authority in 1972 for advisement on how to manage Brookley. It was formally created as an independent authority by the Alabama Legislature in 1982, charged with the management of both Brookley and the Mobile Regional Airport. The site was renamed Brookley Complex at this time. A new terminal building was completed in 1986. Attempting to capitalize off the site's unique mix of road, rail, water, and air transportation, the authority began a campaign during the late 1980s to recruit the aviation and aerospace industries to Brookley. This mission has continued to the present.

On January 22, 2019, Mobile Downtown Airport announced the beginning of Frontier Airlines nonstop flights to Denver (DEN) and Chicago O’Hare (ORD) starting on May 1, 2019. There are 3 flights per week to Denver (Monday, Wednesday, Saturday) and 2 flights per week to Chicago (Wednesday, Saturday). Both destinations are operated with Airbus A320 aircraft, which are assembled on-site.

On Monday, January 6, 2020, Frontier Airlines announced a suspension of all scheduled flights to and from the Mobile Downtown Airport, citing insufficient demand. This decision would leave the Mobile Downtown Airport without any commercial airline services for the foreseeable future.

According to an announcement released Monday, April 6, 2020, by the Mobile Airport Authority, Frontier will begin to offer direct flights to Orlando International Airport starting Saturday, April 18. This reverses a January 2020 decision by Frontier to end service to Mobile on April 22 with a return unlikely before 2021. And it means that the new mini-terminal that the Airport Authority opened at the Downtown Mobile Airport in the Brookley Aeroplex in 2019, at a cost of about $8 million, will continue to serve at least one client airline.

== Airport ==
A major component of the aeroplex is the Mobile Downtown Airport, a general aviation facility. The airport elevation is 26 feet (7.9 m), and it has a control tower and two asphalt/concrete runways:

- 14/32: 9,618 ft × 150 ft (2,932 m × 46 m)
- 18/36: 7,800 ft × 150 ft (2,377 m × 46 m)

== Facilities and services ==
The Mobile Aeroplex at Brookley is the largest industrial and transportation complex in the region, with approximately 70 companies employing about 3600. Notable tenants at Brookley include Airbus North America Engineering (Airbus Military North America's facilities are at the Mobile Regional Airport), Continental Motors, Martin Collier Phillips Corporation, and ST Aerospace Mobile. ST Aerospace Mobile serves as a maintenance provider for Delta Air Lines (Airbus A319/320), FedEx Express, American Airlines, and United Airlines. FedEx Express also uses the complex for three daily cargo flights from Memphis, Tennessee.

The site is spread over 1,650 acres (668 ha). The complex is home to many aerospace industries and features direct connections with Mobile Bay via its own docks, CSX railway, and with Interstate 10. It is included in Mobile's Foreign Trade Zone 82, a zone that provides special customs procedures to U.S. plants engaged in international trade-related activities.

=== EADS and Airbus ===
On February 29, 2008, the United States Air Force announced that a partnership between Northrop Grumman and EADS North America had won first round of a contract to produce the new KC-45 aerial refueling tanker to replace the Boeing KC-135 Stratotanker. The contract would have been worth up to $40 billion with 179 planes to be delivered over the succeeding ten to fifteen years, with production of these aircraft at Brookley.

Following a formal protest from Boeing, the competition was reopened. Although Northrop Grumman declined to bid (stating that it considered the RFP to be too heavily weighted in favor of Boeing and its planned Boeing 767 entry), on April 20, 2010, EADS announced it was re-entering the competition on a stand-alone basis, and intended to enter a bid with the KC-45 with final assembly at Brookley. EADS also announced plans to move its Airbus A330-200F freighter assembly line from France to Mobile as well if it got the contract. This time, however, Boeing won the contract in February 2011 and EADS did not contest the result.

Beginning on June 27, 2012, The New York Times and other news outlets reported that Airbus, a subsidiary of EADS, had decided to locate a new factory in Mobile for the manufacture of the Airbus A320. The initial reports were confirmed by the Press-Register, which reported on June 30, 2012 that the deal had been approved by Airbus. The plans include a $600 million factory at the Brookley Aeroplex for the assembly of the A319, A320 and A321 aircraft, all part of the Airbus A320 family. It could employ up to 1,000 full-time workers when at full capacity. Construction began in the spring of 2013, with it becoming operable by 2015 and producing 40 to 50 aircraft per year by 2017. The plan was formally announced by Airbus CEO Fabrice Brégier from the Mobile Convention Center on July 2, 2012. A ground breaking ceremony for the factory was held on April 8, 2013.

Airbus Mobile officially opened on September 14, 2015, covering one million square feet on 53 acres of flat grassland.

On October 16, 2017, Airbus announced a partnership with Bombardier Aerospace, taking over a majority share of the Bombardier CSeries airliner program. As a result of this partnership, Airbus plans to open an assembly line for CSeries aircraft in Mobile, particularly to serve the US market. This effort may allow the companies to circumvent high countervailing duties on the CSeries family. The CSeries was renamed the Airbus A220 on 10 July 2018; deliveries from Mobile started on 22nd October 2020.

In 2025, Airbus inaugurated its second A320 assembly line in Mobile, bringing another 1,000+ jobs to the area.
