= EADS/Northrop Grumman KC-45 =

Proposed aerial refueling tanker aircraft

KC-45
- Rendering of KC-45 refueling a B-2

General information
- Type: Tanker/transport
- Manufacturer: EADS/Northrop Grumman
- Status: Lost competition to KC-46
- Primary user: United States Air Force
- Number built: None

History
- Developed from: Airbus A330 MRTT

The EADS/Northrop Grumman KC-45 was a proposed aerial refueling tanker aircraft based on the Airbus A330 MRTT. The United States Air Force (USAF) had ordered 179 KC-45As in the first stage of replacing the aging Boeing KC-135 Stratotanker tankers currently in service. However, the contest was reopened in July 2008, after Boeing's protest of the award was upheld. In response to the new contest, on 8 March 2010, Northrop Grumman announced it was abandoning its bid for the new contract, with its CEO stating that the revised bid requirement favoured Boeing. On 20 April 2010, EADS (now known as Airbus SE) announced it was re-entering the competition and entered a bid with the KC-45. Eventually, the USAF selected the Boeing KC-46 Pegasus.

== Development ==
=== Background ===
From the late 1990s the USAF decided to replace its fleet of KC-135s. Initially the first batch of replacements was to be an air tanker version of the Boeing 767-200, which was selected over the Airbus 330-based tanker. Instead of outright purchase, as is the usual practice, the Air Force would lease the 767 tankers from Boeing. In January 2006, then-Secretary of Defense Donald Rumsfeld announced the cancellation of the KC-767 contract. Rumsfeld stated that this move would in no way impair the Air Force's ability to deliver the mission of the KC-767, which was to be accomplished by continuing upgrades to the KC-135 Stratotanker and KC-10 Extender fleets.

=== KC-X program ===
In 2006, the USAF released a request for proposal (RFP) for a new tanker aircraft, known as the KC-X RFP, which was updated in January 2007 and was to be selected by 2007. KC-X is the first phase of three acquisition programs to replace the KC-135 fleet.

On 29 February 2008, the Department of Defense announced that it had selected the Northrop Grumman "KC-30" (designated the KC-45A by the USAF) over the Boeing KC-767 for the first stage of the program. On 11 March 2008, Boeing filed a protest with the Government Accountability Office (GAO) for the award of the contract to Northrop Grumman. Following the protest filing, Northrop Grumman and Boeing engaged in media campaigns in support of their tanker aircraft.

On 18 June 2008, the Government Accountability Office upheld the protest by Boeing on the decision to award the contract to Northrop Grumman, indicating that the USAF had not properly evaluated the Boeing and Northrop Grumman bids.

On 9 July 2008 Secretary of Defense Robert Gates announced the contract for the KC-45 as an "expedited recompetition". Defense Undersecretary John Young was placed in charge of the review process, the Air Force having been removed from the award process. On 10 September 2008, the US Defense Department canceled the KC-X solicitation. Funding for KC-X is to be requested for FY10-FY15. In September 2009, the USAF began the first steps toward accepting new bids. In March 2010, Northrop Grumman announced that it would pull out of the bidding process.

EADS and Boeing submitted their final KC-X tanker bids on 10 February 2011. On 24 February 2011, the USAF announced the Boeing's bid had won the KC-X contract.

=== Production plans ===
The first four units would have been converted from passenger versions at EADS EFW in Dresden, Germany. Airbus planned to assemble the aircraft in Mobile, Alabama, after which they would have been modified by Northrop Grumman. EADS had also announced plans to shift A330 commercial freighter assembly to Alabama. As the winner of the Air Force contract, Northrop Grumman and EADS (the airframe subcontractor) were expected to invest approximately US$600 million in new assembly plants in the United States adjacent to one another in the Brookley Complex in Mobile.

EADS's failure to win the contract meant that the Alabama production line for the Airbus A330 was never set up. However, on 30 June 2012, EADS announced a new factory at Mobile, Alabama to manufacture the narrow-body Airbus A320, which began operations on 14 September 2015.

== Design ==
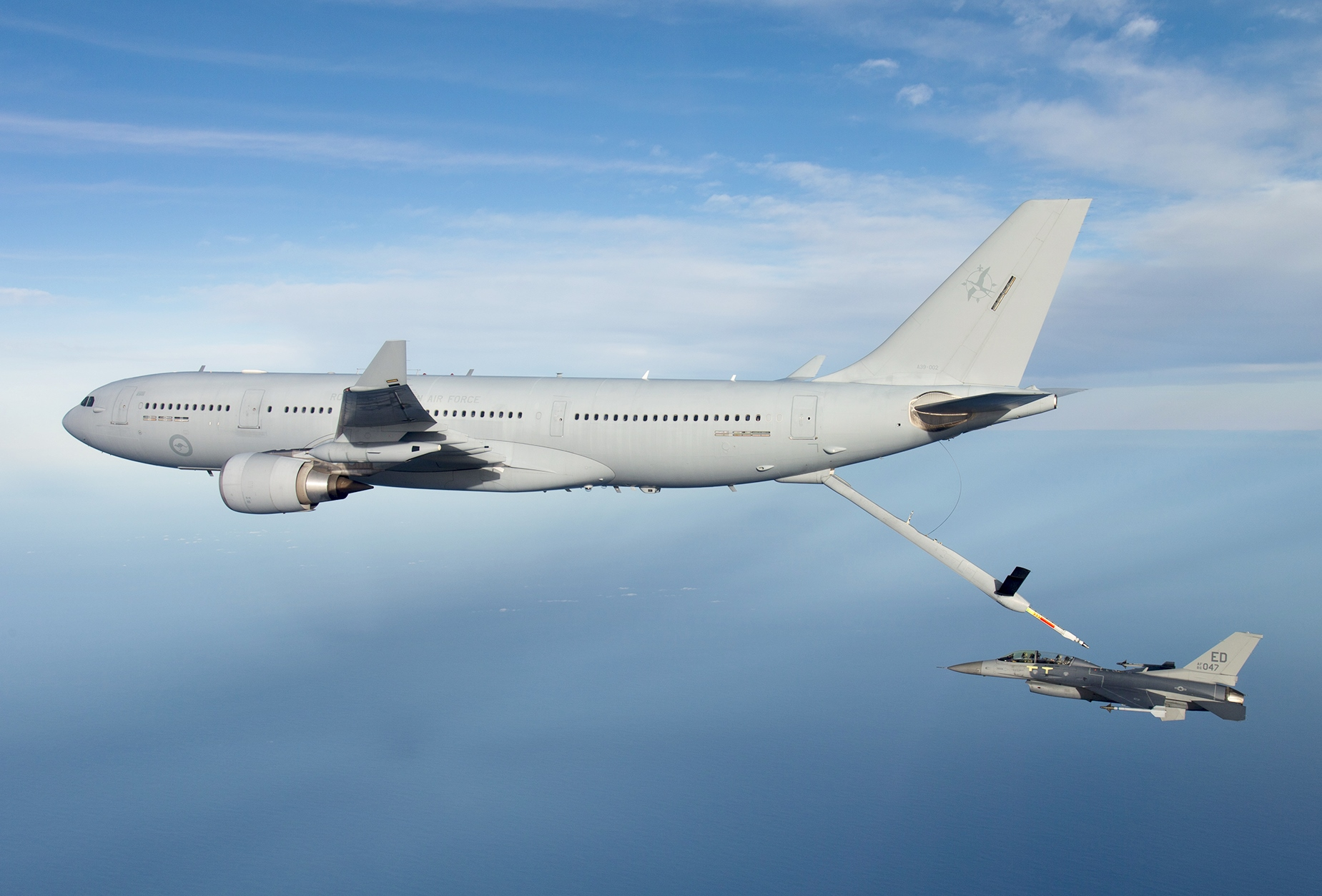
An Australian Airbus A330 MRTT (under designation KC-30) refueling an USAF F-16 jetfighter. The proposed KC-45 would have had a similar design and configuration to this KC-30.

The A330 Multi Role Tanker Transport (MRTT) is a military derivative of the Airbus A330 airliner. It is designed as a dual-role air refueling tanker and cargo transport aircraft. The wing air refueling pods are supplied by the British company Cobham. The cargo hold has been modified by Telair to be able to transport military pallets in addition to civilian ULD.

The A330 MRTT has a fuel capacity of 245,000 lb (111,000 kg) in the wings and underfloor tanks. The underfloor tanks do not compromise main deck cargo capacity or seating in the strategic transport role. Standard fuel capacity allows the carriage of an additional 43,000 kg of cargo. The A330 MRTT's wing has common structure as the four-engine A340-200/-300 with reinforced mounting locations for the A340's outboard engines. The A330 MRTT's wing therefore requires little modification for use of these hardpoints for the wing refueling pods.

The KC-45 would have been fitted with an Aerial Refuelling Boom System (ARBS), two Cobham 905E underwing refuelling pods and one Cobham 805E Fuselage Refuelling Unit (FRU).

== Specifications ==
Note: specifications denoted with a "*" are for the A330.

Data from KC-30, KC-45, and Airbus A330

General characteristics

- Crew: 3 (pilot, copilot, and boom operator)
- Capacity: 226 passengers
- Length: 192 ft 11 in (58.78 m)
- Wingspan: 197 ft 10 in (60.28 m)
- Height: 57 ft 1 in (17.40 m)
- Wing area: 3,892 sq ft (361.6 m^{2}) *
- Empty weight: 265,657 lb (120,500 kg) *
- Max takeoff weight: 507,063 lb (230,000 kg) *
- Maximum Fuel Capability: 245,000 lb (111,000 kg)
- Non-fuel payload: 104,000 lb (47,200 kg)
- Cargo: 32 pallets
- Powerplant: 2 × Rolls-Royce Trent 772B, General Electric CF6-80E1A4, or Pratt & Whitney PW 4170; turboprop, 72,000 lbf (320 kN) thrust each

Performance

- Maximum speed: 547 mph (880 km/h, 475 kn) *
- Cruise speed: 534 mph (860 km/h, 464 kn) *
- Range: 7,770 mi (12,500 km, 6,750 nmi) *
- Service ceiling: 41,000 ft (12,500 m) *

== See also ==
- Future Strategic Tanker Aircraft – British military procurement project

Related development

- Airbus A310 MRTT – Air to air refuelling tanker and transport aircraft
- Airbus A330 MRTT – Aerial refuelling tanker aircraft

Aircraft of comparable role, configuration, and era

- Boeing KC-767 – 2000s American military tanker/transport aircraft
- Boeing KC-46 Pegasus – American military aerial refueling and transport aircraft

Related lists

- List of tanker aircraft
- List of United States military aerial refueling aircraft
