= St. Elmo Airport =

St. Elmo Airport St Elmo Army Auxiliary Airfield
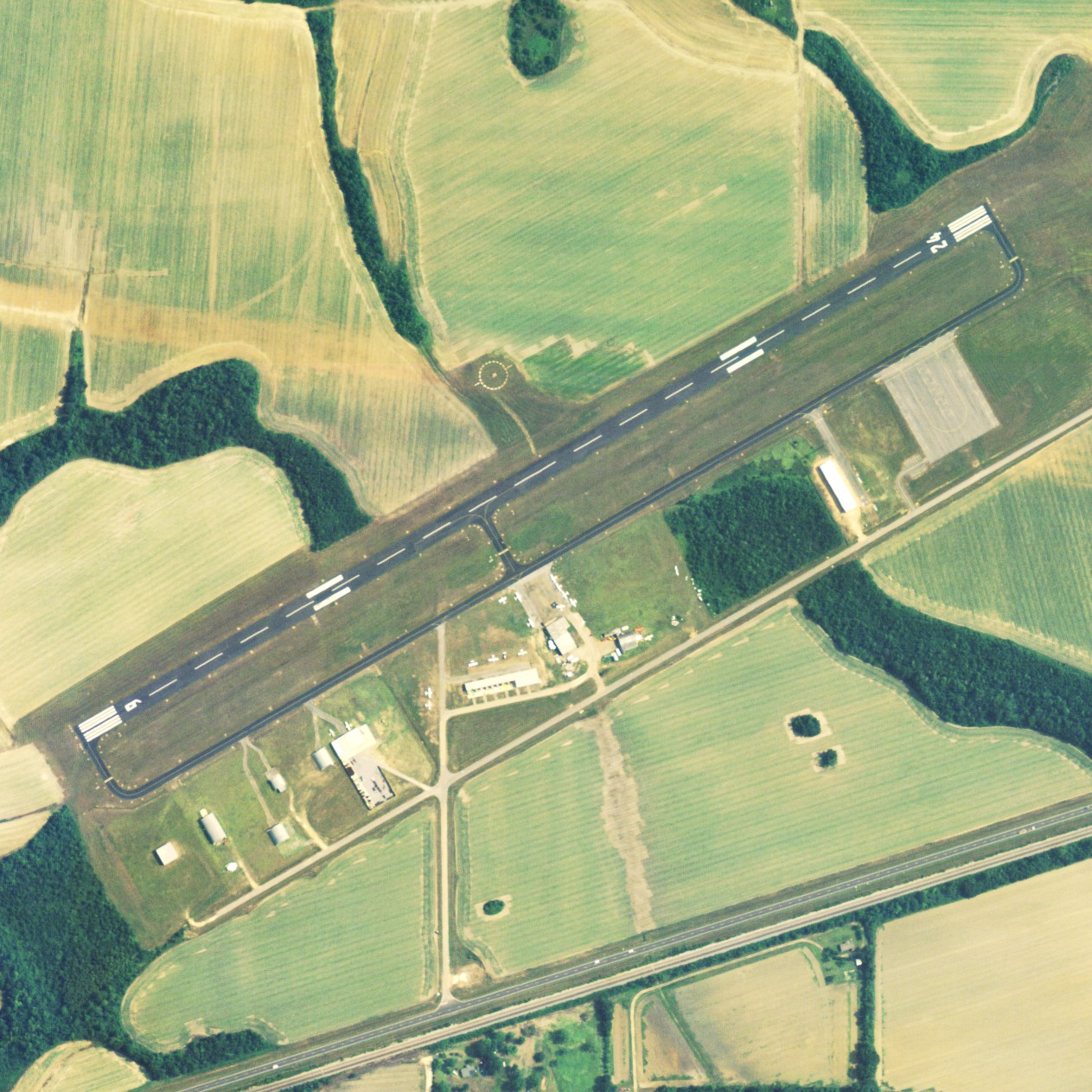
- NAIP aerial image, 2006
- IATA: none; ICAO: none; FAA LID: 2R5

Summary
- Airport type: Public
- Owner: Mobile Airport Authority
- Serves: St. Elmo, Alabama
- Elevation AMSL: 132 ft / 40 m
- Coordinates: 30°30′07″N 088°16′30″W

Map
- Location of St. Elmo Airport 2R5 (the United States)

Runways
Direction	Length		Surface
Direction	ft	m	Surface
6/24	3,998	1,219	Asphalt

Statistics (2010)
- Aircraft operations: 20,400
- Based aircraft: 31
- Source: Federal Aviation Administration

St. Elmo Airport (FAA LID: 2R5) is a public-use airport located two nautical miles (2.3 mi; 3.7 km) west of the central business district of St. Elmo, in Mobile County, Alabama, United States. It is included in the FAA's National Plan of Integrated Airport Systems for 2011–2015, which categorized it as a general aviation facility.

== Facilities and aircraft ==
St. Elmo Airport covers an area of 733 acres (297 ha) at an elevation of 132 feet (40 m) above mean sea level. It has one runway designated 6/24 with an asphalt surface measuring 3,998 by 80 feet (1,219 by 24 m).

For the 12-month period ending May 18, 2010, the airport had 20,400 general aviation aircraft operations, an average of 55 per day. At that time there were 31 aircraft based at this airport: 71% single-engine, 7% multi-engine, 3% jet, 3% helicopter and 16% ultralight.

== World War II ==
During World War II, the airport was used as an auxiliary airfield for the Army contract flying school at Bates Army Airfield in Mobile. The contract flying school operated between 1942 and 1944.

== See also ==
- List of airports in Alabama
