= Mobile Regional Airport =

Airport in Mobile County, Alabama, US

Mobile Regional Airport Coast Guard Aviation Training Center Mobile

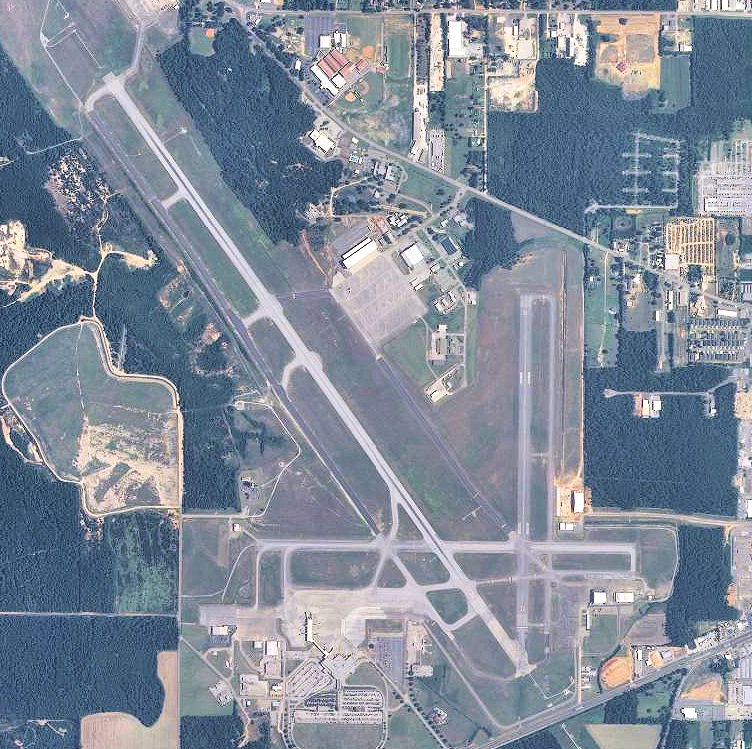
- USGS 2006 orthophoto
- IATA: MOB; ICAO: KMOB; FAA LID: MOB; WMO: 72223

Summary
- Airport type: Public / military
- Owner/Operator: Mobile Airport Authority
- Serves: Mobile, Alabama
- Location: Mobile County
- Elevation AMSL: 219 ft (67 m)
- Coordinates: 30°41′29″N 88°14′34″W
- Website: www.mobairport.com

Maps
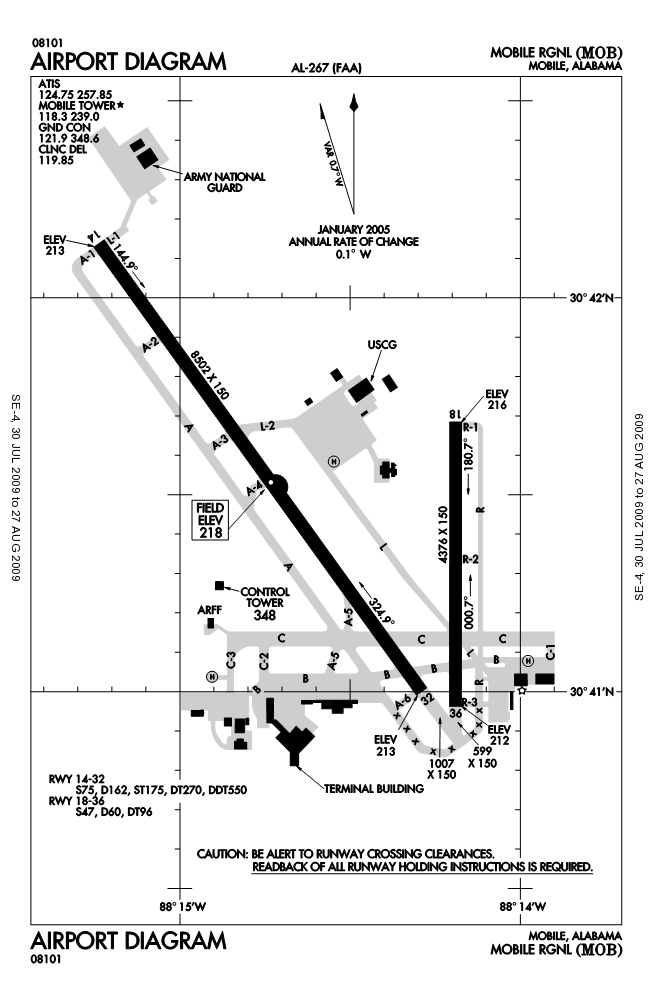
- FAA airport diagram
- Interactive map of Mobile Regional Airport

Runways
Direction	Length		Surface
Direction	ft	m	Surface
15/33	8,502	2,591	Asphalt
18/36	4,376	1,334	Asphalt

Helipads
Number	Length		Surface
Number	ft	m	Surface
H1	100	30	Asphalt

Statistics (2018)
- Passengers: 594,410
- Aircraft operations: 65,408
- Based aircraft: 6
- Source: Bureau of Transportation Statistics, Federal Aviation Administration

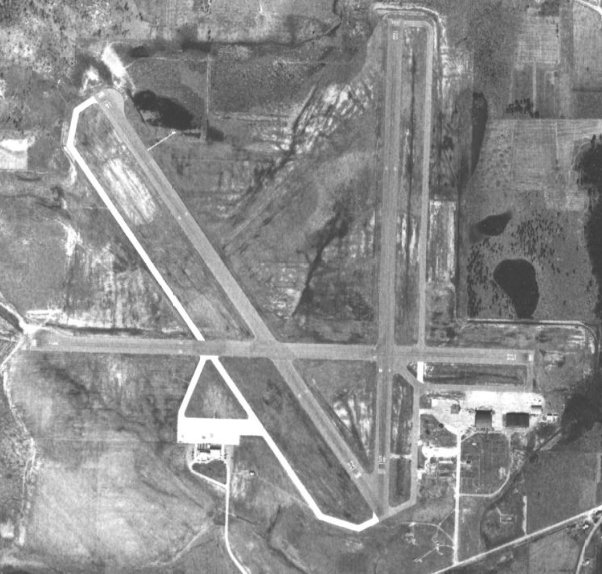
Bates Field, February 1952

Mobile Regional Airport (IATA: MOB, ICAO: KMOB, FAA LID: MOB) is a public/military airport 13 miles (21 km) west of Mobile, in Mobile County, Alabama, United States. The airport is owned and operated by the Mobile Airport Authority, a self-funded entity that receives no local tax dollars.

The National Plan of Integrated Airport Systems for 2011–2015 categorized it as a primary commercial service airport. Federal Aviation Administration records show the airport had 286,956 passenger boardings (enplanements) in calendar year 2008, 280,491 in 2009 and 277,232 in 2010.

The airport is home to U.S. Coast Guard Aviation Training Center, Mobile, providing advanced training to U.S. Coast Guard pilots and aircrew in MH-65D Dolphin and MH-60T Jayhawk helicopters, as well as the HC-144A/B Ocean Sentry turboprop aircraft. The Alabama Army National Guard's "B" Company, 1st Battalion, 131st Aviation Regiment, is also located at the airport.

In August 2020 it was announced that the Mobile Airport Authority will shift commercial airline flights to the more convenient Mobile Downtown Airport, now renamed Mobile International Airport.

== History ==
=== Early years ===
Eastern Air Lines served Mobile from the 1930s until 1991; in the 1930s Eastern's one flight a day each way between Newark and San Antonio stopped at what is now Mobile International Airport.

=== Bates Field ===
During World War II, the United States Army Air Forces used Mobile Regional Airport. The 533d Army Air Force Base Unit commanded the airport, then known as Bates Field. The Army Air Forces also operated an auxiliary airfield at St. Elmo Airport.

The Army used this airport as a basic (level 1) pilot training airfield, under contract to Waterman Airlines. They performed flying training with Fairchild PT-19 aircraft as the primary trainer. The Army also assigned several Boeing-Stearman Model 75 aircraft. The Army also used Bates for glider pilot training under contract to Mobile Area Soaring, which used primarily Douglas C-47 Skytrain and Waco CG-4 unpowered gliders. The school aimed to train student pilots in proficiency in operation of gliders in various types of towed and soaring flight, both day and night, and in servicing of gliders in the field.

In 1944 with the reduced demand for pilots, the Army ended the flying training, and Domestic Transport Division of Air Transport Command used the airport as a transport airfield. Air Transport Command moved operations to Brookley Field (later Brookley Air Force Base) near downtown Mobile in late 1945.

=== U.S. Air Force and U.S. Coast Guard activity ===
The U.S. Air Force returned to Bates Field in May 1959 when the Air Force Reserve activated the 78th Troop Carrier Squadron at the airport with Fairchild C-119 Flying Boxcar aircraft. In 1961, the Air Force moved this squadron to Barksdale Air Force Base in Louisiana as a Douglas C-124 Globemaster II heavy-lift squadron. The 357th Troop Carrier Squadron then replaced it and acquired the C-119s. The Air Force subsequently upgraded Bates to a Group level upon organizing the 908th Troop Carrier Group, Medium in 1963. However, the Air Force then moved the reservists to the larger Brookley Air Force Base located near downtown Mobile in October 1964 due to budget restraints.

In 1966 the U.S. Coast Guard acquired the vacant U.S. Air Force Reserve facility on the airfield. On December 17, 1966, the Coast Guard officially commissioned an Air Station in Mobile with Grumman HU-16 Albatross fixed wing aircraft from the Coast Guard's Air Station in nearby Biloxi. The Coast Guard also established a fixed wing and helicopter training facility at the airport. U.S. Coast Guard Air Station Mobile serves as an Aviation Training Center with a designated headquarters unit that is under the direct control of the Commandant of the Coast Guard.

=== Past airline service ===
Eastern Airlines was first at Mobile, at the airport south of town until about 1941 when it and National moved to the present airport. In the 1960s Eastern Airlines flew Lockheed L-188 Electras to Mobile, then Boeing 727-100s and Douglas DC-9s mainly to Atlanta. Eastern served Mobile until its demise in 1991.

National Airlines Jacksonville-New Orleans flights stopped at the airport south of Mobile starting about 1939. National Lockheed L-188 Electras appeared in 1962–63; later their Boeing 727-200s flew nonstop to New Orleans and Houston. After its acquisition of National, Pan Am 727s served the airport until 1981.

Capital Airlines began Mobile flights in 1948; United Airlines acquired Capital in 1961 and served Mobile with Douglas DC-6Bs and Capital's Vickers Viscounts. Mobile's first jets were United Sud Aviation Caravelles to Newark via Birmingham in April 1962. United ended mainline service to Mobile in 1971, but United Express regional jets still serve the airport.

Southern Airways arrived at Mobile in 1950–51; in the 1970s Southern flew nonstop Douglas DC-9s to Atlanta and New Orleans. Southern merged with North Central Airlines to form Republic Airlines which was acquired by Northwest Airlines which continued at Mobile with DC-9s to the Northwest hub in Memphis. Northwest eventually merged into Delta Air Lines.

Starting in 1981 American Airlines Boeing 727-200s flew to Dallas/Fort Worth Airport via Jackson, MS or New Orleans, LA. American also flew to its hub in Nashville from the mid-1980s to the early 1990s before the airline closed that hub.

USAir (later US Airways and now merged into American Airlines) flew nonstop to Charlotte, NC in the mid 1990s with McDonnell Douglas DC-9-30s and Fokker 100s.

Texas International arrived in 1979; successor Continental Airlines flew Boeing 737-200s and McDonnell Douglas DC-9-30s nonstop to Houston Intercontinental Airport in the late 1990s. Continental has since merged into United Airlines.

The MC Farmer Terminal was completed in 1985.

=== The 21st century ===
United Airlines via United Express served Mobile from its hubs in Chicago (ORD) and Washington D.C. (IAD). After the September 11, 2001 attacks, United canceled all service at Mobile. United Express reinstated nonstop service to Houston (IAH) and Chicago (ORD) after United’s merger with Continental Airlines. On September 5, 2018, United stopped flights to Chicago (ORD), citing low demand. All United Express flights at Mobile are regional jets.

In 2006 Delta Air Lines dropped several flights from Mobile and Continental Airlines added flights. In December 2006, Delta had six weekday flights to Atlanta and one to its Cincinnati hub. Delta ended service to Cincinnati on December 12, 2006.

American Airlines restored flights to Chicago (ORD) in April 2007 but ended them in September 2008. Flights to Charlotte and Dallas/Ft. Worth continue on its American Eagle affiliate with Embraer ERJs.

In 2010, Northwest Airlines merged into Delta Air Lines. Northwest had operated nonstops from Mobile to its hub in Memphis; those flights ended after the merger.

After its merger with Continental Airlines in 2012, United Airlines (via its United Express regional affiliate operated by ExpressJet) resumed flights to its hub in Houston (IAH), seven weekday flights. United Express resumed service to the hub in Chicago (ORD) on April 9, 2013.

== Facilities ==
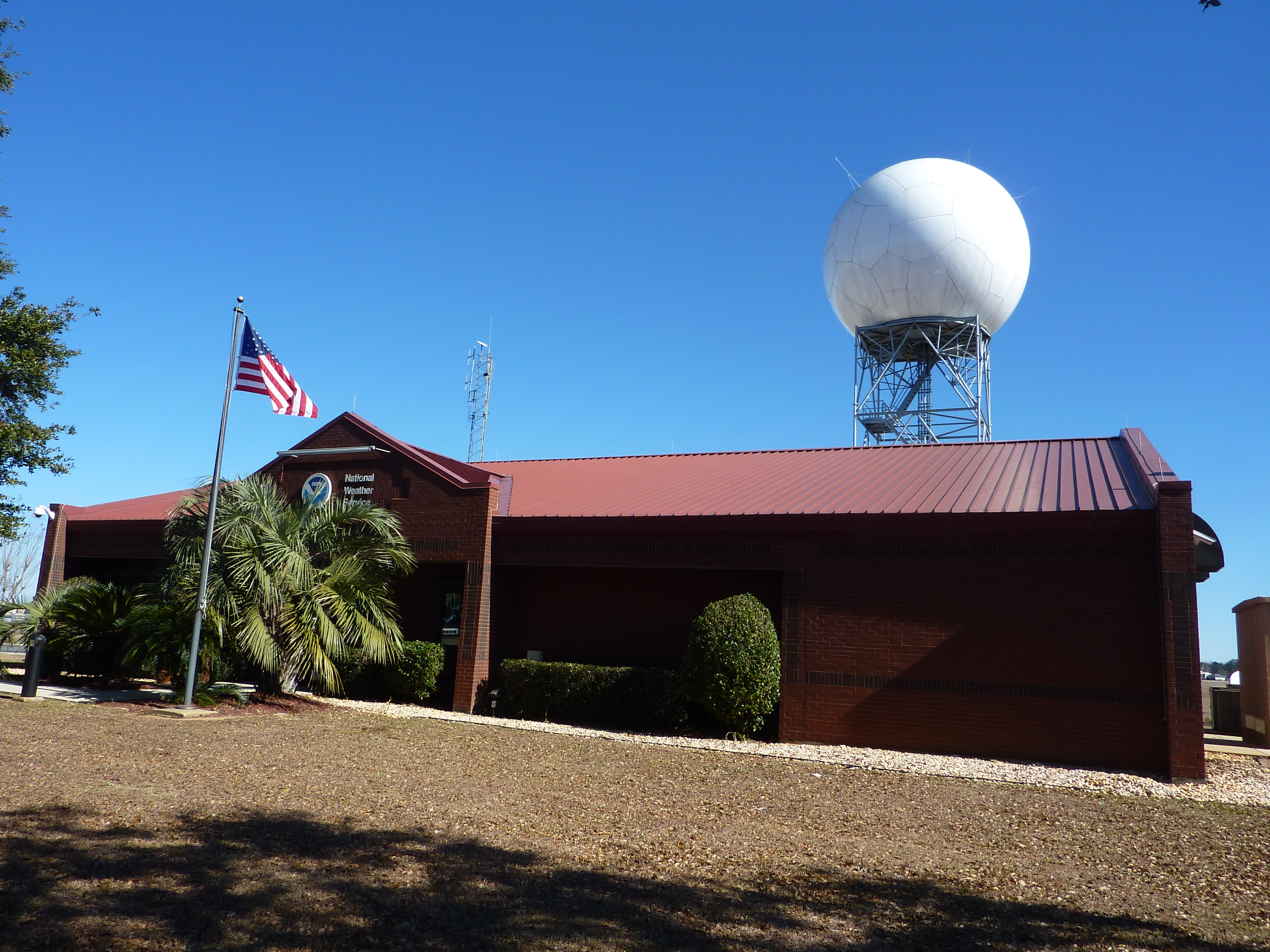
NWS Forecast Office just off Airport Road

Mobile Regional Airport covers 1,717 acres (695 ha) at an elevation of 219 feet (67 m). It has two runways: 15/33 is 8,502 by 150 feet (2,591 x 46 m) and 18/36 is 4,376 by 150 feet (1,334 x 46 m). It has one asphalt helipad, which is 100 by 100 feet (30 x 30 m). The National Weather Service Forecast Office for Southern Alabama, situated near Airport Road and the runway, has a full complement of meteorological instruments, including a NEXRAD weather radar. The airport has 6 gates with jetways.

The terminal at Mobile Regional Airport has renovated shops and restaurants, car rental agencies, and handicap accessible elevators.

In the year ending October 30, 2021, the airport had 75,034 aircraft operations, average 205 per day: 72% military, 14% general aviation, 8% air taxi, and 5% airline. 31 aircraft were then based at this airport: 6 single-engine and 25 military.

== Airlines and destinations ==
=== Airlines ===
The major carriers out of Mobile are United Airlines and Delta Air Lines, based on the number of flights. Additional weekday departures were as follows: Charlotte (four flights via American Eagle) and Dallas/Fort Worth (three flights via American Eagle). Schedules were slightly reduced on the weekends.

Various carriers represent all three major airline alliances—SkyTeam, Star Alliance, and Oneworld—at Mobile, allowing for connections to partner airlines.

Regional airlines flying for the major United States network airlines, as listed, primarily serve Mobile. Delta Air Lines alone operates mainline passenger service from the airport and uses such jet types as the Boeing 717 and the Airbus A319. Delta also operated the McDonnell Douglas DC-9-50 into Mobile prior to the retirement of this aircraft type from their fleet. All other scheduled passenger services are currently operated with either Canadair or Embraer regional jet aircraft.

=== Destinations ===
The following are flown nonstop or direct from Mobile:

Airlines	Destinations
American Eagle	Charlotte, Dallas/Fort Worth,
Delta Air Lines	Atlanta
Delta Connection	Atlanta
United Express	Houston–Intercontinental, Washington–Dulles

Destinations map
Destinations from Mobile Regional Airport
Red = Year-round destination
Blue = Future destination

== Statistics ==
=== Top destinations ===
Busiest domestic routes from MOB (April 2025 – March 2026)
Rank	Airport	Passengers	Carriers
1	Atlanta, Georgia	130,160	Delta
2	Houston–Intercontinental, Texas	66,350	United
3	Dallas/Fort Worth, Texas	65,580	American
4	Charlotte, North Carolina	44,200	American
5	Washington–Dulles	25,560	United

=== Other statistics ===
Airline market share (April 2025 – March 2026)
Rank	Airline	Passenger	Market share
3	CommuteAir	161,000	24.26%
2	Endeavor	124,000	18.64%
3	Delta	120,000	18.15%
4	Piedmont	87,210	13.14%
5	PSA	78,200	11.78%
	Other	93,000	14.01%

== Accidents and incidents ==
- On February 1, 2016, at around 9:00pm, two people died while returning home on an Angel Flight. The cause of the crash was the heavy fog that also hampered the search for the wrecked plane, a Cessna 182, which was not found until 2:00am on Tuesday, February 2. The crew members who died in the crash were identified as Maj. David R. Mauritson and 2nd Lt. Phil J. Dryden. The men were members of the Civil Air Patrol.

== See also ==
- Alabama World War II Army Airfields
- 29th Flying Training Wing (U.S. Army Air Forces)
- List of airports in Alabama

== Bibliography ==
- This article incorporates public domain material from the Air Force Historical Research Agency
- Manning, Thomas A. (2005), History of Air Education and Training Command, 1942–2002. Office of History and Research, Headquarters, AETC, Randolph AFB, Texas OCLC 71006954, 29991467
- Shaw, Frederick J. (2004), Locating Air Force Base Sites, History’s Legacy, Air Force History and Museums Program, United States Air Force, Washington DC. OCLC 57007862, 1050653629
