= Mobile International Airport =

Airport in Mobile, Alabama, United States

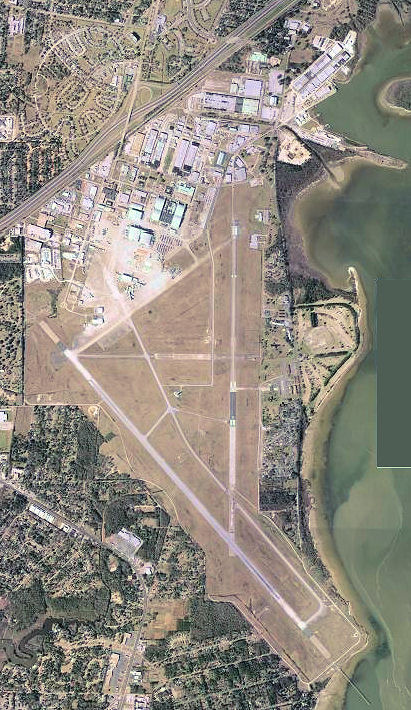
- USGS aerial image, 2002
- IATA: BFM; ICAO: KBFM; FAA LID: BFM

Summary
- Airport type: Public
- Owner/Operator: Mobile Airport Authority
- Serves: Mobile, Alabama
- Elevation AMSL: 26 ft (7.9 m)
- Coordinates: 30°37′36″N 088°04′05″W
- Website: http://www.flybfm.com

Maps
- FAA airport diagram
- Interactive map of Mobile International Airport

Runways
Direction	Length		Surface
Direction	ft	m	Surface
14/32	9,618	2,932	Asphalt/Concrete
18/36	7,800	2,377	Asphalt/concrete

Statistics (2024)
- Aircraft operations: 50,899
- Total Passengers: 10,804
- Based aircraft: 25
- Source: FAA and airport website

Mobile International Airport (IATA: BFM, ICAO: KBFM, FAA LID: BFM) is a public use airport located three nautical miles (6 km) south of the central business district of Mobile, a city in Mobile County, Alabama, United States. The airport is a principal component of the Mobile Aeroplex at Brookley, a 1,650-acre (668 ha) industrial complex. Presently the facility covers 1,616 acres (654 ha) of land. It is owned and operated by the Mobile Airport Authority. Prior to 1969, the airport was part of an active military installation known as Brookley Air Force Base.

According to the FAA's National Plan of Integrated Airport Systems for 2009–2013, it is categorized as a general aviation facility. This was a change from the 2007–2011 NPIAS Report, when it was categorized as a reliever airport.

== Facilities ==
The airport has a control tower and has both a 9,618-by-150-foot (2,932 m × 46 m) runway and a 7,800-by-150-foot (2,377 m × 46 m) runway. Various instrument approaches to all runways are available, including an on-site VORTAC and instrument landing system (ILS). The complex is served by a 24-hour fixed-base operator, Signature Flight Services.

In late 2018, the Mobile Airport Authority began renovating an underutilized building partially occupied by Airbus into a low-cost carrier passenger airport facility called Terminal 1. Since its opening on May 1, 2019, Terminal 1 has housed two boarding gates and five ticket counters. Frontier Airlines Flight 410 from Chicago's O'Hare International Airport was the first scheduled revenue flight, arriving at the facility on May 1. In the summer of 2019, the authority plans to take over the remaining space in the building to completely build out Terminal 1. After this build-out, Terminal 1 will have four gates and additional holding and concession space. The total square footage will be around 50,000 square feet.

Terminal 1 is located at the southern terminus of Michigan Avenue in the Brookley Complex, less than a mile south of Interstate 10.

== Operations ==
For the 12-month period ending October 31, 2023, the airport had 21,276 aircraft operations, an average of 68 per day: 53% military, 30% general aviation, 9% air taxi, and 7% scheduled commercial. At that time there were 25 aircraft based at this airport: 16 single-engine, 2 multi-engine, 6 jet and 1 helicopter.

== Airlines and destinations ==
In 2018, the Mobile Airport Authority commissioned a study on whether to move passenger service to Mobile Downtown Airport from Mobile Regional Airport and announced ViaAir would start a route to Orlando in the spring. In January 2019, Frontier Airlines announced new service to Denver and Chicago beginning in May 2019. ViaAir announced they were ending most scheduled services network-wide, including at BFM, on May 23, 2019. On January 7, 2020, Frontier announced it would suspend all service to BFM, leaving the airport with no commercial passenger service. However, on April 13, 2020, Frontier announced it would stay at the Downtown Airport and commence service to Orlando. On June 4, 2020, it was announced that Frontier had ceased all operations at BFM.

In August 2020, the Mobile Airport Authority began working on a master plan to shift commercial airline flights to the more convenient downtown airport. The FAA approved the move in April 2021. The new passenger terminal will feature five gates and is projected to open in fall 2026. The move is expected to make the airport more convenient for Baldwin County passengers, making it more competitive against Pensacola International Airport.

On March 7, 2023, Avelo Airlines announced twice weekly service to Orlando. The service was suspended indefinitely beginning March 4, 2024.

On January 24, 2024, Breeze Airways announced twice weekly service to Orlando. The airline suspended service to Mobile on January 31, 2025.

Cargo

Airlines	Destinations
Amazon Air	Fort Worth/Alliance
FedEx Express	Memphis

== Accidents and incidents ==
- On May 3, 1943, a USAAF Douglas C-53 Skytrooper, a version of the Douglas C-47 Skytrain crashed into Mobile Bay after takeoff, 0.5 miles S of then Mobile-Brookley AAF (BFM). Number of occupants/fatalities unknown.
- On April 4, 1952, a mid-air collision occurred at night between a Douglas C-124 Globemaster II and a Douglas C-47 Skytrain 9km N of Mobile-Brookley AFB. Both aircraft spun down, crashing on top of parked railroad box cars and bursting into flames. Six occupants died on the Globemaster and 9 occupants on the Skytrain were killed.

== See also ==
- List of airports in Alabama
