= 1998 Atlantic hurricane season =

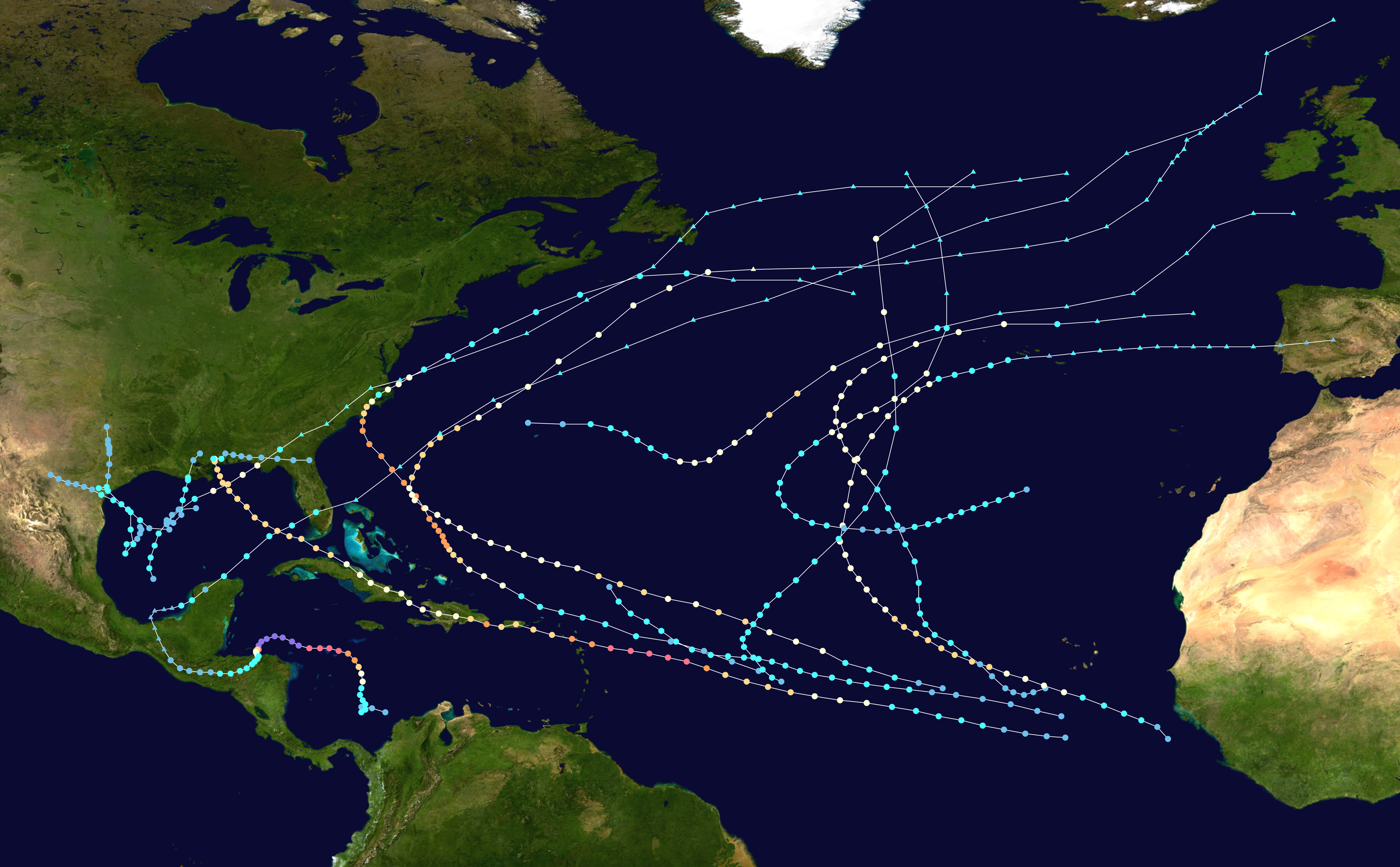
- Season summary map

Seasonal boundaries
- First system formed: July 27, 1998
- Last system dissipated: December 1, 1998

Strongest storm
- Name: Mitch
  - Maximum winds: 180 mph (285 km/h) (1-minute sustained)
  - Lowest pressure: 905 mbar (hPa; 26.72 inHg)

Seasonal statistics
- Total depressions: 14
- Total storms: 14
- Hurricanes: 10
- Major hurricanes (Cat. 3+): 3
- ACE: 181.8 (Tenth highest)
- Total fatalities: >12,018 total (Second-deadliest Atlantic season on record)
- Total damage: $17.08 billion (1998 USD)

Related articles
- Timeline of the 1998 Atlantic hurricane season; 1998 Pacific hurricane season; 1998 Pacific typhoon season; 1998 North Indian Ocean cyclone season

The 1998 Atlantic hurricane season was an active, catastrophic, and extremely deadly Atlantic hurricane season, which had the highest number of storm-related fatalities in 2 centuries and ranks as the second-deadliest season on record in the Atlantic, behind the 1780 season. Additionally, the season featured some of the costliest tropical cyclones ever in the basin at the time. The season had above average activity, due to the dissipation of an El Niño event and transition to La Niña conditions. It officially began on June 1 and ended on November 30, dates which conventionally delimit the period during which most tropical cyclones form in the Atlantic Ocean. The season had a rather slow start, with no tropical cyclones forming in June. The first tropical cyclone, Tropical Storm Alex, developed on July 27, one of the latest dates on record to see the formation of the first system in an Atlantic hurricane season. The season's final storm, Hurricane Nicole, became extratropical on December 1.

Several storms made landfall or directly affected land. Hurricane Bonnie made landfall in southeastern North Carolina as a Category 2 hurricane in late August, killing five people and causing about $1 billion in damage. Hurricane Earl caused $79 million in damage and three deaths after making landfall in Florida as a Category 1 hurricane.

The most notable storms were Hurricane Georges and Hurricane Mitch. Georges devastated Saint Kitts and Nevis, Puerto Rico and the Dominican Republic as a major Category 3 storm but peaked as a high-end Category 4 hurricane just before moving through many of the Caribbean Islands before affecting the southern US mainland, making its landfall near Biloxi, Mississippi, causing significant damage and at least 600 confirmed deaths. Mitch was a destructive Category 5 hurricane that affected much of Central America before making landfall in Florida as a tropical storm. It caused significant damage and killed at least 11,000 people in Central America, and was the second deadliest Atlantic hurricane in recorded history, behind only the Great Hurricane of 1780. Georges and Mitch caused $9.37 billion in damage and $6.08 billion USD) in damage, respectively. As a whole, the 1998 Atlantic hurricane season was, at the time, the second-costliest season on record, after the 1992 season.

== Season forecasts ==
Predictions of tropical activity in the 1998 season
Source	Date	Named storms	Hurricanes	Major hurricanes	Ref
Average (1981–2010)		12.1	6.4	2.7
Record high activity		30	15	7†
Record low activity		1	0†	0†
CSU	December 1997	9	5	2
WRC	Early 1998	8	5	N/A
CSU	April 1998	10	6	2
CSU	June 1998	10	6	2
CSU	August 1998	10	6	2
	Actual activity	14	10	3
† Most recent of several such occurrences. (See all)

In advance of, and during, each hurricane season, several forecasts of hurricane activity are issued by national meteorological services, scientific agencies, and noted hurricane experts. These include forecasters from the United States National Oceanic and Atmospheric Administration (NOAA)'s National Hurricane and Climate Prediction Center's, William M. Gray and his associates at Colorado State University (CSU), as well as Weather Research Center (WRC). The forecasts include weekly and monthly changes in significant factors that help determine the number of tropical storms, hurricanes, and major hurricanes within a particular year.

As stated by NOAA and CSU, an average Atlantic hurricane season between 1981–2010 contains roughly 12 tropical storms, 6 hurricanes, 3 major hurricanes, and an accumulated cyclone energy (ACE) Index of 66–103 units. NOAA typically categorizes a season as either above-average, average, of below-average based on the cumulative ACE Index; however, the number of tropical storms, hurricanes, and major hurricanes within a hurricane season is considered occasionally as well.

CSU began issuing outlooks in December 1997 and initially predicted 9 named storms, 5 hurricanes, and 2 major hurricanes would occur in the upcoming season. Later, in April 1998, CSU released a forecast calling for 10 named storms, 6 hurricanes, and 2 major hurricanes. The predictions by CSU in June and August 1998 remained the same as the forecast in April. Additionally, forecasters at CSU predicted that the El Niño event that began in 1997 would dissipate either before or shortly after the 1998 season began. The WRC predicted 8 named storms and 5 hurricanes in early 1998, but did not include a forecast for the number of major hurricanes.

== Seasonal summary ==
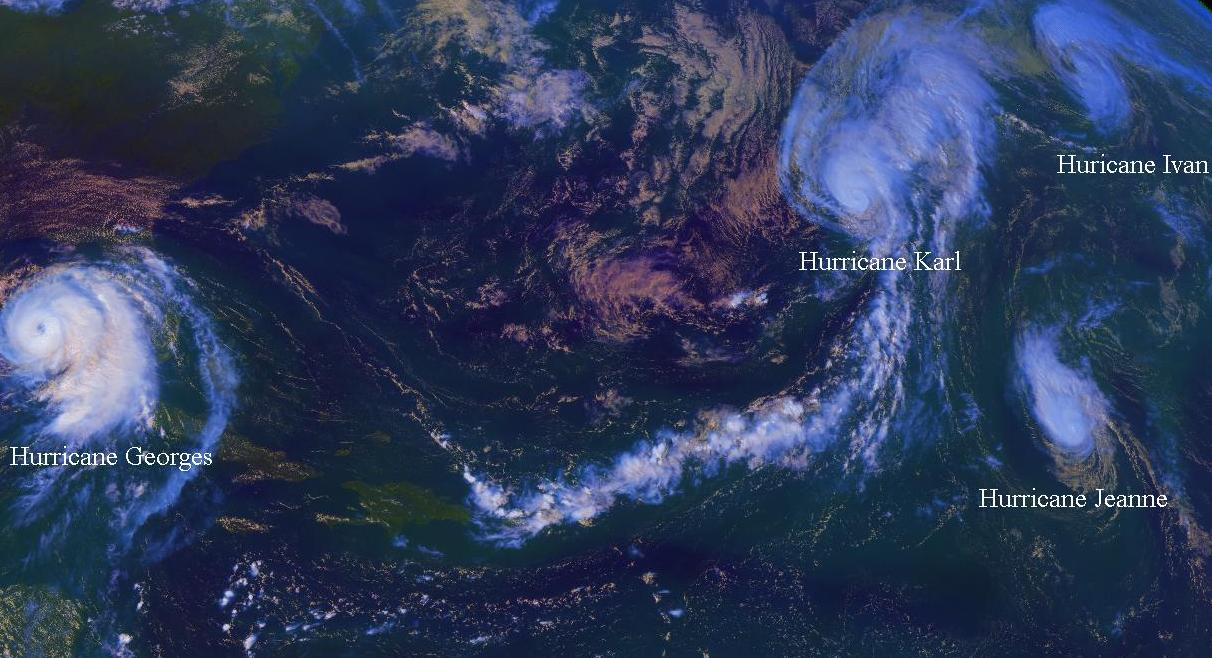
Four hurricanes were simultaneously active on September 26 – Georges, Ivan, Karl, and Jeanne.

The Atlantic hurricane season officially began on June 1, 1998, with the first tropical cyclone developing on July 27. It was an above average season in which 14 tropical cyclones formed. All fourteen depressions attained tropical storm status and ten of these became a hurricane. Three hurricanes further intensified into major hurricanes. The dissipation of an El Niño in April and the development of a La Niña by June was attributed to the above average activity. Three hurricanes and three tropical storms made landfall during the season and caused at least 19,618 deaths and nearly $17.1 billion in damage. Hurricane Danielle also caused damage in Puerto Rico, although it never made landfall. The last storm of the season, Hurricane Nicole, dissipated on December 1, which was the day after the official season ending on November 30.

Activity in the season began very slowly, with the first tropical cyclone not forming until July 27. It did not become Tropical Storm Alex until July 29, which was an abnormally late first named storm for an Atlantic hurricane season. After a gap in activity for about two weeks, Hurricane Bonnie developed on August 19. Thereafter, tropical cyclogenesis became more frequent, with an additional three storms forming by the end of August. September was the most active month, coinciding with the climatological peak of the season. Six tropical cyclones formed in that month, four of which reached hurricane intensity. Four hurricanes were active on September 26, with Georges over the Straits of Florida, Ivan in the North Atlantic, Jeanne was located near Cape Verde, and Karl was situated over the Central Atlantic. This was the first such occurrence since August 22 in 1893. However, three hurricanes also co-existed in the Atlantic on September 11 in 1961, with a possible fourth. Following a busy September, activity began slowing into October, when only two tropical cyclones developed. However, both storms became a hurricane, with the second cyclone, Hurricane Mitch, becoming the most intense and deadliest storm of the 1998 Atlantic hurricane season.

Overall, the season's activity was reflected with a cumulative accumulated cyclone energy (ACE) rating of 182. ACE is, broadly speaking, a measure of the power of the hurricane multiplied by the length of time it existed, so storms that last a long time, as well as particularly strong hurricanes, have high ACEs. It is only calculated for full advisories on tropical systems at or exceeding 34 knots (39 mph; 63 km/h) or tropical storm strength.

== Systems ==
=== Tropical Storm Alex ===
- Tropical storm (SSHWS)
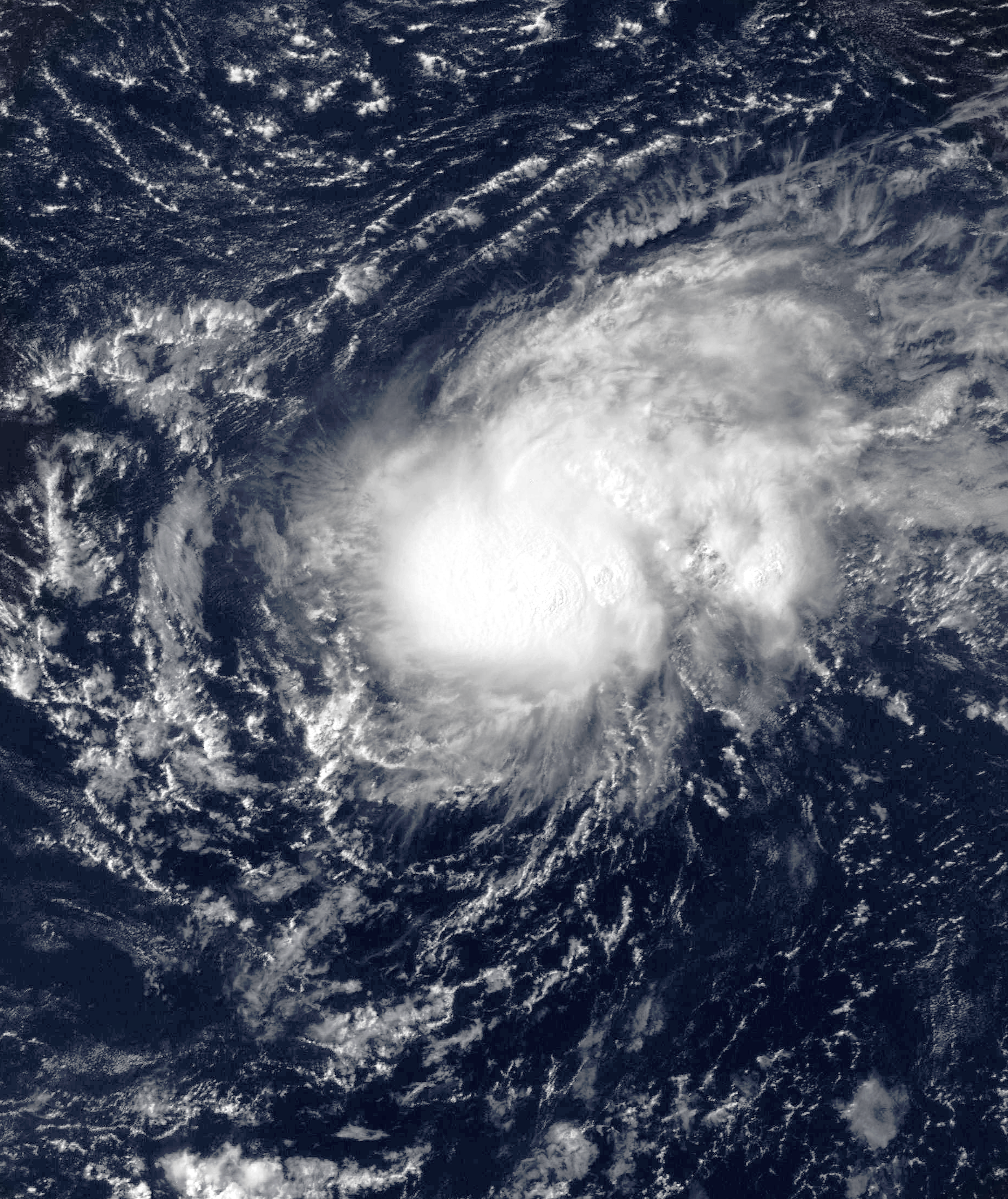
- Duration: July 27 – August 2
- Peak intensity: 50 mph (85 km/h) (1-min); 1002 mbar (hPa)

A tropical wave emerged off the west coast of Africa on July 26 and rapidly developed a surface circulation by the following day. As a result, it is estimated that Tropical Depression One formed at 1200 UTC on July 27, while centered about 345 miles (555 km) south-southwest of Cape Verde. Initially, minimal change in structure or convection occurred. However, after an increase in deep convection and satellite intensity estimates of 40 mph (64 km/h), the depression was upgraded to Tropical Storm Alex early on July 29. Under the influence of a deep-layer ridge, the storm tracked west to west-northwestward at 12 to 17 mph (19 to 27 km/h). A mid- to upper-level trough located north and west of Alex generated vertical wind shear starting on July 30, allowing for minimal intensification.

Later on July 30, a burst in deep convection resulted in slight strengthening of the storm. At 0000 UTC on July 31, Alex attained its peak intensity with a maximum sustained wind speed of 50 mph (80 km/h) and a minimum atmospheric pressure of 1,000 mbar (30 inHg). Vertical wind shear prevented Alex from strengthening further and instead caused it to weaken later that day. By August 1, the low-level circulation became exposed to the south of the remaining deep convection. Later that day, Alex curved northwestward and avoided any threat to the Lesser Antilles. At 1800 UTC on August 1, the storm was downgraded to a tropical depression. Early on the following day, Alex was considered dissipated after a reconnaissance aircraft failed to locate a closed low-level circulation.

=== Hurricane Bonnie ===
- Category 3 hurricane (SSHWS)
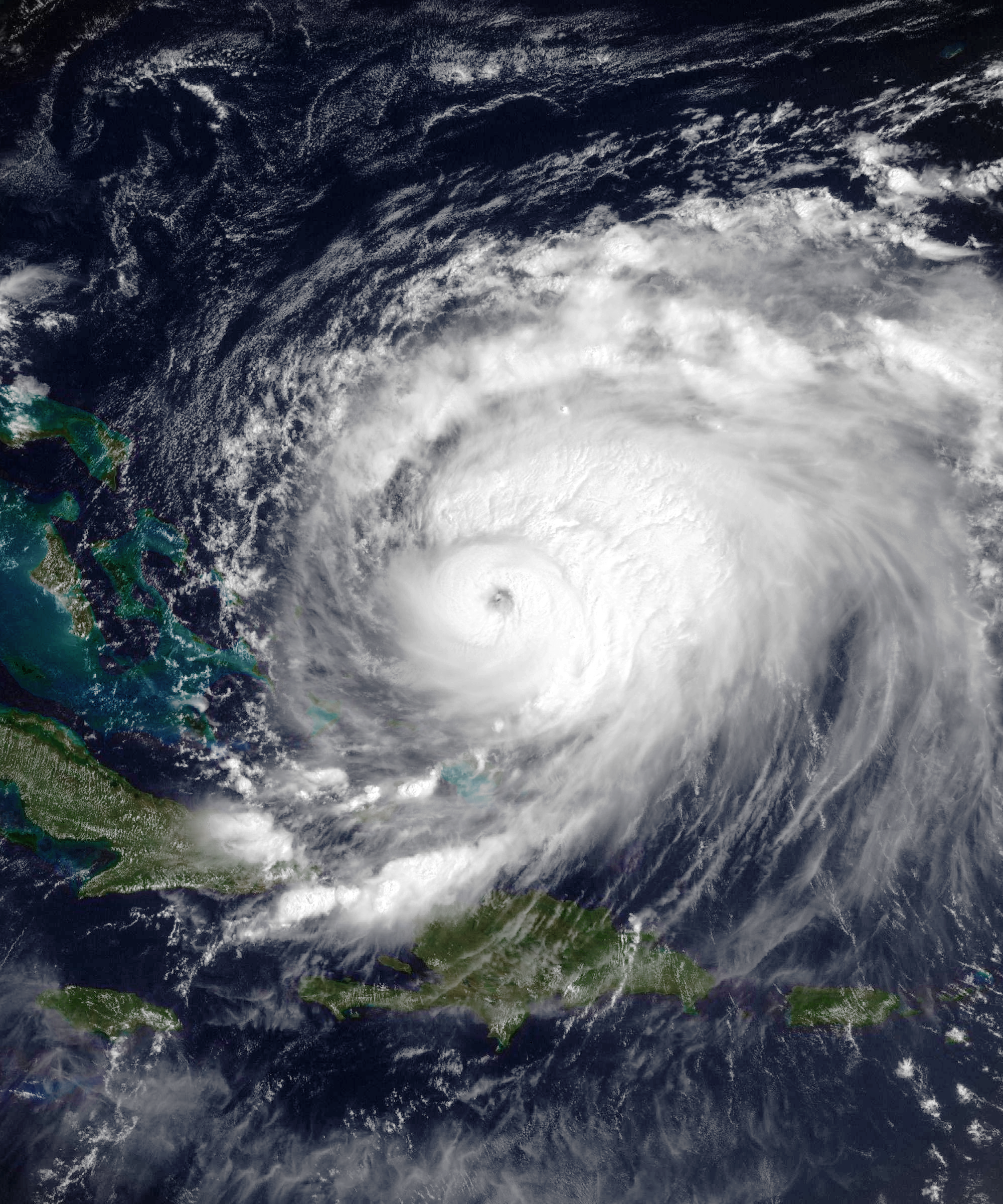
- Duration: August 19 – August 30
- Peak intensity: 115 mph (185 km/h) (1-min); 954 mbar (hPa)

Tropical Depression Two developed from a tropical wave at 1200 UTC on August 19, while located well east of the Lesser Antilles. After tracking west-northwestward for 24 hours, the depression was upgraded to Tropical Storm Bonnie. While at tropical storm intensity, Bonnie passed north of Puerto Rico and the Virgin Islands on August 21. Early on the following day, a hurricane hunter aircraft indicated that the storm strengthened into a hurricane. Bonnie curved north-northwestward on August 23, shortly before it peaked with winds of 115 mph (185 km/h). The storm weakened slightly before making landfall near Wilmington, North Carolina with winds of 110 mph (180 km/h) early on August 27. The storm briefly weakened to a tropical storm later on August 27, though it re-strengthened into a hurricane as it was re-emerging into the Atlantic. Colder waters weakened Bonnie to a tropical storm by late on August 28. The storm then accelerated east-northeastward offshore New England and Atlantic Canada, before becoming an extratropical cyclone on August 30.

In South Carolina, strong winds were reported, particularly in Charleston, Georgetown, and Horry Counties. Many trees and power lines were downed in the area; there was also structural damage. The storm caused two deaths and about $25 million in losses in South Carolina. Strong winds lashed Eastern North Carolina, downing numerous trees and power lines, which left about 500,000 people without electricity. One person was killed in Barco when a tree fell on a house. In North Carolina alone, damage reached at least $240 million. Erosion was also severe, with numerous docks, piers, and bulkheads either damaged or destroyed; many protective dunes constructed after Hurricane Fran in 1996 were ruined. In Virginia, strong winds in the eastern portions of the state caused some structural damage and downed trees and power lines, leaving about 750,000 people without electricity.

Damage in Virginia reached approximately $95 million. Two other fatalities were reported, one in Rehoboth Beach, Delaware and the other at Cape Cod, Massachusetts. Later in its duration, Bonnie brought rough seas, strong winds, and light rainfall to Newfoundland and Nova Scotia, but caused little damage. Overall, there were five deaths and at least $720 million in damage, while other sources claimed that losses reached $1 billion.

=== Tropical Storm Charley ===
- Tropical storm (SSHWS)
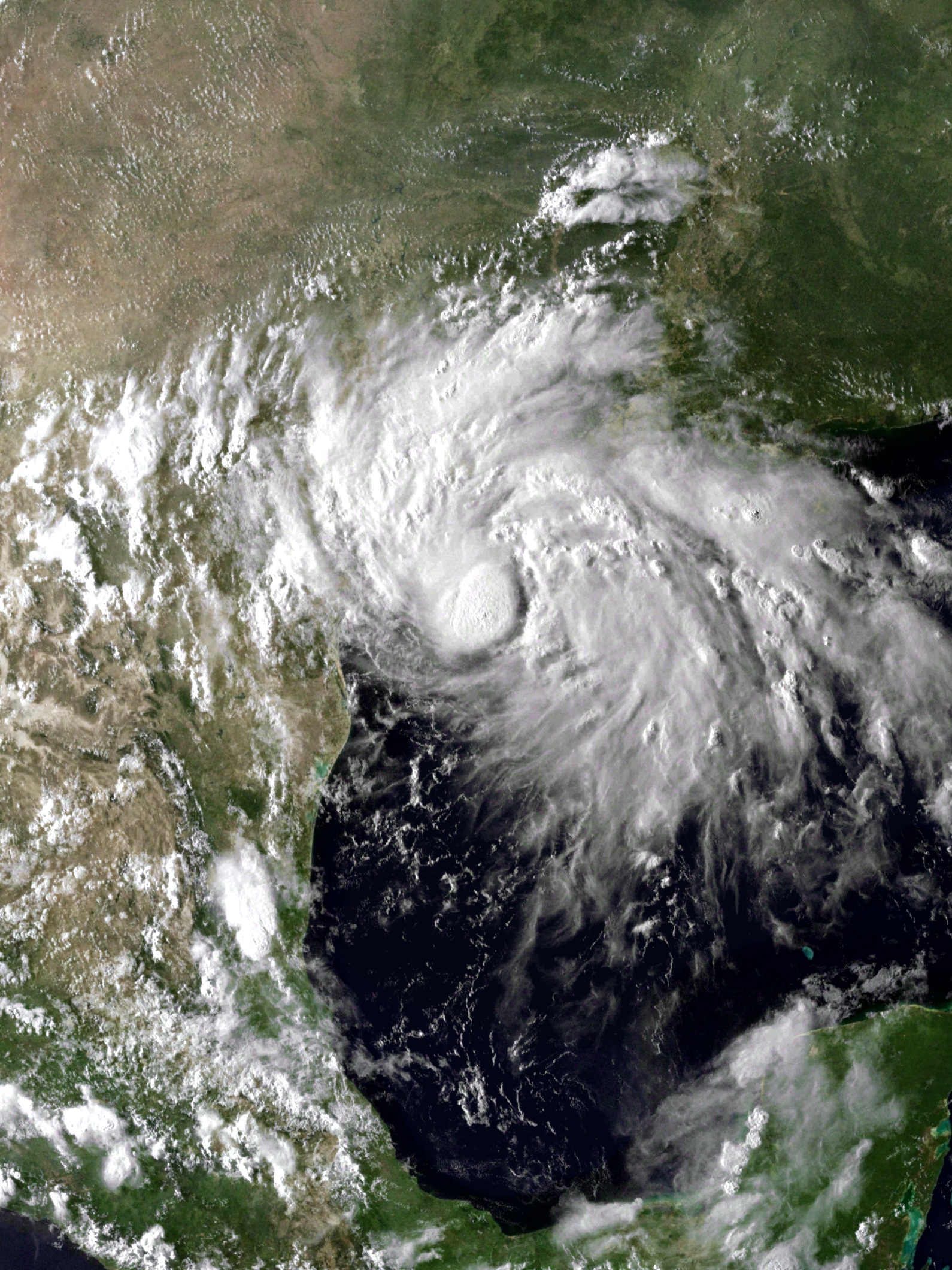
- Duration: August 21 – August 24
- Peak intensity: 70 mph (110 km/h) (1-min); 1000 mbar (hPa)

An area of disturbed weather developed into Tropical Depression Three at 0600 UTC on August 21, while located about 305 miles (491 km) east-southeast of Brownsville, Texas. The depression moved generally northwestward throughout its duration. Based on data from oil platforms in the northern Gulf of Mexico, the depression was upgraded to Tropical Storm Charley at 1800 UTC on August 21. The storm intensified further, with reconnaissance aircraft reporting sustained winds of 70 mph (110 km/h) at 0600 UTC on August 22. Shortly thereafter, Charley weakened and only four hours later, it made landfall near Port Aransas, Texas with winds of 45 mph (72 km/h). Late on August 22, the system weakened to a tropical depression. Charley persisted as a tropical cyclone for about 24 hours longer, before dissipating near Del Rio, Texas.

Heavy rainfall was reported throughout southern Texas. Del Rio recorded 17 inches (430 mm) of precipitation in a 24‑hour period, a record for the city. Charley was also responsible for serious local flooding in Val Verde County, Texas, where collectively about 2,000 houses, mobile homes, and apartments were destroyed. In that county alone, damage was estimated at $40 million. Throughout Texas, losses reached about $50 million and 13 deaths were confirmed, with an additional 6 people listed as missing. Flooding also occurred in northern Mexico, especially in the state of Coahuila. Ciudad Acuña was inundated with up to 6 feet (1.8 m) of water, which damaged about 450 houses in the city; seven deaths were also reported in the area.

=== Hurricane Danielle ===
- Category 2 hurricane (SSHWS)
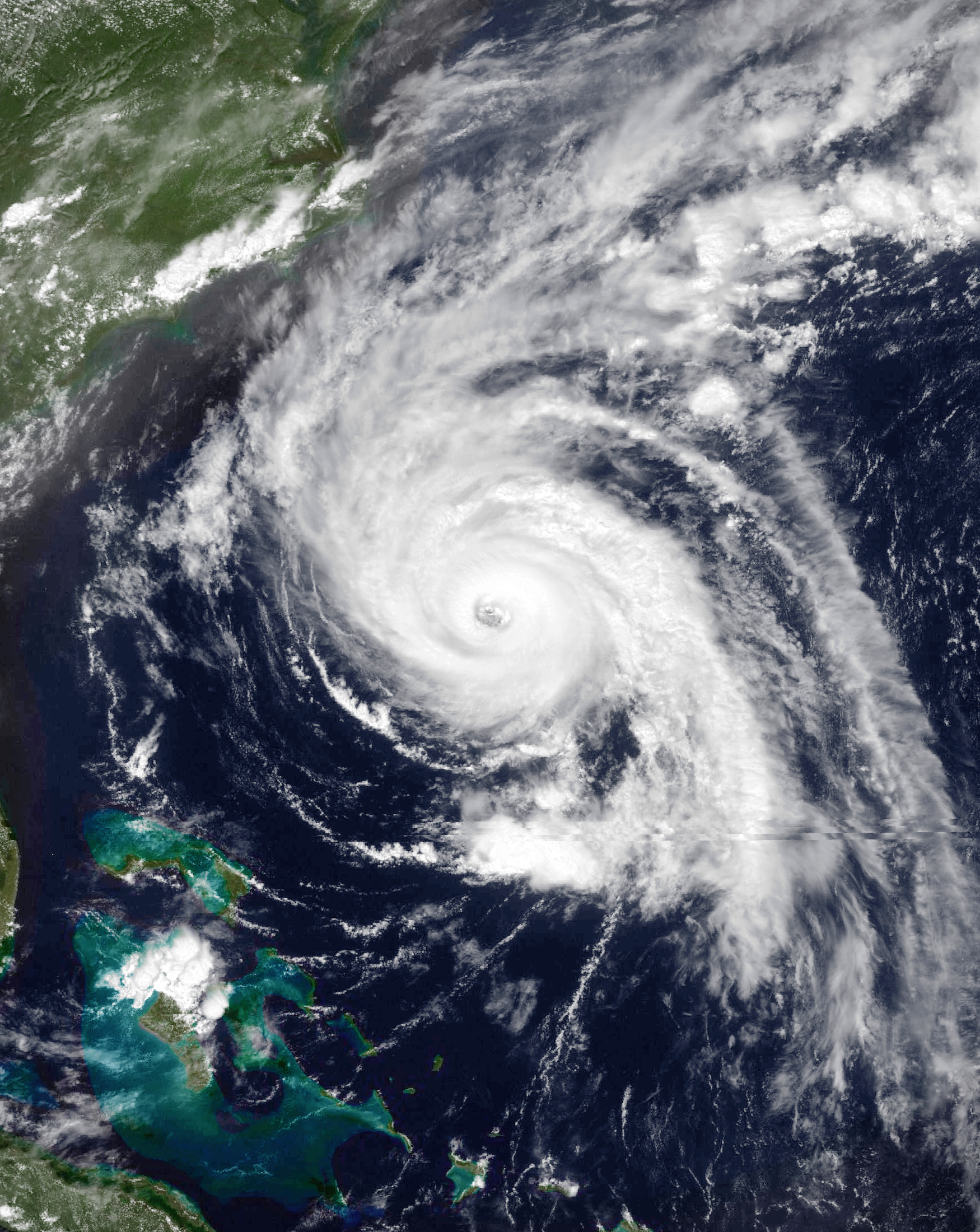
- Duration: August 24 – September 3
- Peak intensity: 105 mph (165 km/h) (1-min); 960 mbar (hPa)

A tropical wave emerged off the western coast of Africa on August 21. The wave moved west-northwestward, steered by the Azores High to its north. It produced an area of convection, which developed into a tropical depression on August 24 about 690 miles (1,110 km) west-southwest of the Cape Verde Islands. The depression quickly organized into Tropical Storm Danielle. A pinhole eye developed in the convection, and Danielle attained hurricane status on August 25. Early on August 26, Danielle attained its maximum sustained wind speed of 105 mph (169 km/h), one of four peak intensities. Soon thereafter, the eye became obscured and southeasterly vertical wind shear increased, and the hurricane weakened. The storm briefly re-strengthened slightly on August 27 and reached peak winds for a second time. Vertical wind shear persisted and Danielle soon began to weaken again, partly due to upwelling from Hurricane Bonnie roughly a week earlier.

By early on August 30, Danielle had weakened to the extent that it was only a minimal hurricane. Around that time, an anticyclone near Bermuda caused Danielle to curve northeastward. The hurricane re-intensified and reached its peak intensity for a third time on August 31. It weakened slightly again before attaining peak winds for a fourth and final time on September 1. On the next day, Danielle passed about 105 mi (170 km) north of Bermuda. Early on September 3, Danielle reached its minimum barometric pressure of 960 mbar (960 hPa; 28 inHg). On the next day, Danielle transitioned into an extratropical cyclone while located east-southeast of Newfoundland. The remnants of Danielle continued to the northeast, merging with an extratropical low pressure area north of Ireland on September 8.

Bermuda issued a tropical storm warning due to the storm. A wind gust of 54 mph (87 km/h) was reported. The outer bands of Danielle produced heavy rainfall in Puerto Rico, causing flooding and landslides. In Bayamón, one house was damaged after a wall collapsed. Losses in Puerto Rico totaled approximately $50,000 (1998 USD). Danielle washed loose tires ashore North Carolina part of an artificial reef. Governor Jim Hunt requested prison labor and the National Guard to clean up beaches from Brunswick County to Carteret County. Danielle led to a 1 mile (1.6 km) increase in sand along the New Jersey coastline. Danielle produced light rainfall in Newfoundland. The hurricane's waves led to the rescue of Tori Murden, an American attempting to become the first woman to solo row across the Atlantic Ocean.

While passing near the British Isles as an extratropical storm, Danielle produced severe sea conditions on the western part of the isles. Major beach erosion was observed, and many people required rescuing. Coastal portions of Cornwall were evacuated as high waves inundated many homes, and an all-terrain police vehicle was shoved into the sea by a rogue wave in the Isles of Scilly. Four people in Cornwall required rescue due to rough surf. At the West Sands Caravan Park near Selsey, West Sussex, twelve families were evacuated to higher ground. A yacht carrying eight people ran aground near Calshot; they required rescuing. Flash flooding was reported throughout Wiltshire, especially in the town of Melksham. Numerous motorists were left stranded in inundated streets, while water entered several homes, store basements, a fire station, and the Cooper Avon tyre factory.

=== Hurricane Earl ===
- Category 2 hurricane (SSHWS)
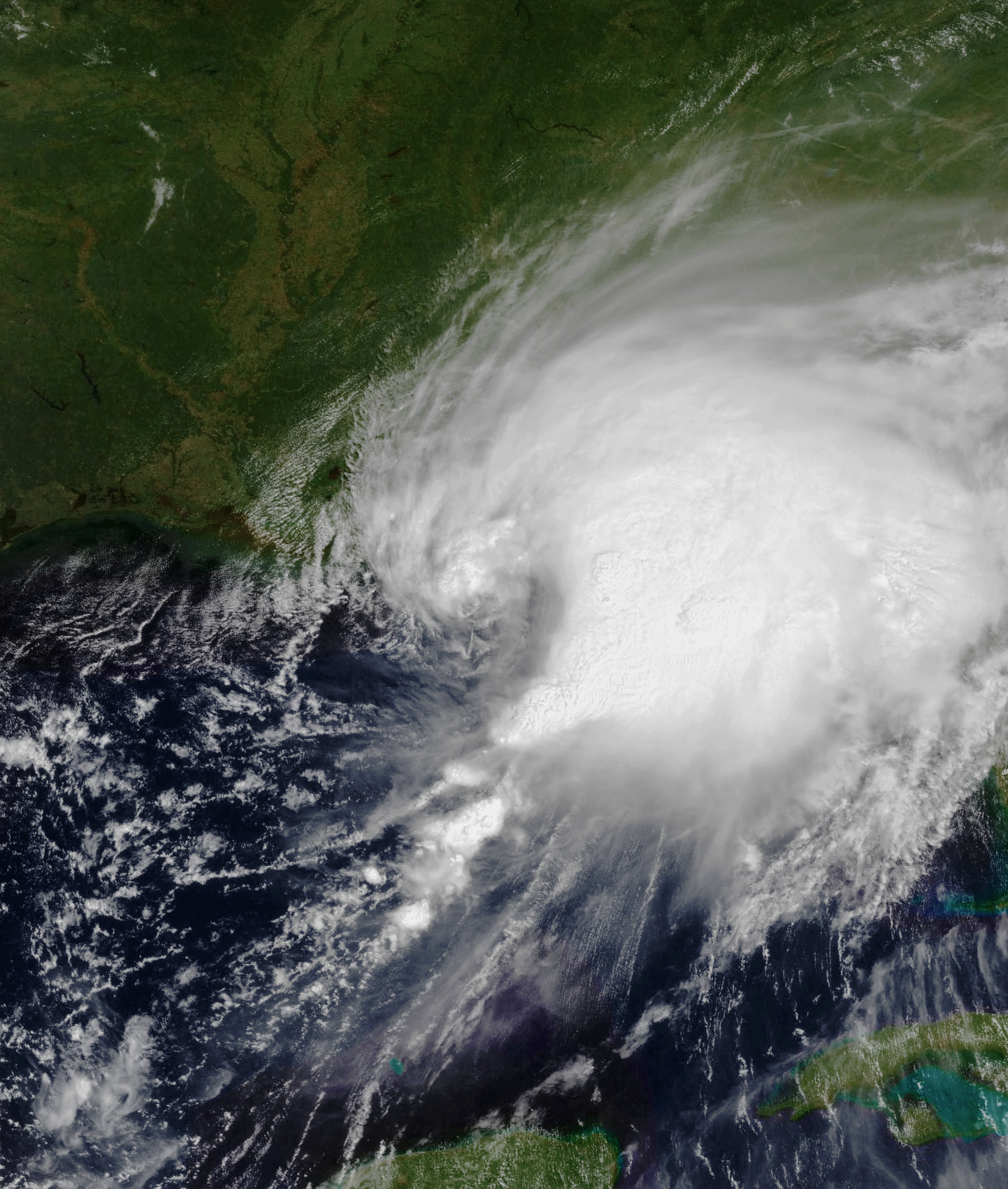
- Duration: August 31 – September 3
- Peak intensity: 100 mph (155 km/h) (1-min); 985 mbar (hPa)

Tropical Depression Five developed from a tropical wave in the southwestern Gulf of Mexico at 1200 UTC on August 31, while located about midway between Mérida, Yucatán and Tampico, Tamaulipas. The depression is estimated to have strengthened into Tropical Storm Earl six hours later, while located about 575 miles (925 km) south-southwest of New Orleans, Louisiana. The storm headed north-northeastward and was difficult to track, due to multiple centers on satellite imagery. Earl slowly curved east-northeastward and continued strengthening, with reconnaissance aircraft data indicating that the storm reached hurricane intensity at 1200 UTC on September 2. It briefly became a Category 2 hurricane about six hours later and peaked with winds of 100 mph (160 km/h). However, the storm weakened back to a Category 1 hurricane early on September 3, before landfall near Panama City, Florida with winds of 80 mph (130 km/h). Earl rapidly weakened to a tropical storm about six hours later and transitioned into an extratropical cyclone over Georgia late on September 3.

Prodigious precipitation fell during its transit of northern Florida, with 16.36 inches (416 mm) near of Panama City. In Gulf County, 300 homes were damaged by high winds and floodwaters. At Port St. Joe, storm surge inundated 14 businesses. Storm surge in Franklin County damaged 136 homes and 15 businesses and led to a brief closure of the St. George Causeway. In Wakulla County, 216 homes and businesses were damaged by high winds and flooding. Severe flooding in coastal Taylor County caused significant damage in nine communities, with 66 structures impacted. Five homes were destroyed and 39 others were damaged by flooding in Dixie County. On September 3, the strongest tornado spawned by Earl in Florida touched down in Citrus County, where it destroyed 8 homes and damaged 24 others. There were 3 fatalities and about $76 million in damage in Florida. In other states, heavy rainfall and tornadoes resulted in severe localized damage, particularly in Alabama, Georgia, North Carolina, and South Carolina. A third storm-related fatality occurred in Saint Helena, South Carolina caused by a tornado. Overall, Earl caused 3 deaths and about $79 million in damage.

=== Tropical Storm Frances ===
- Tropical storm (SSHWS)
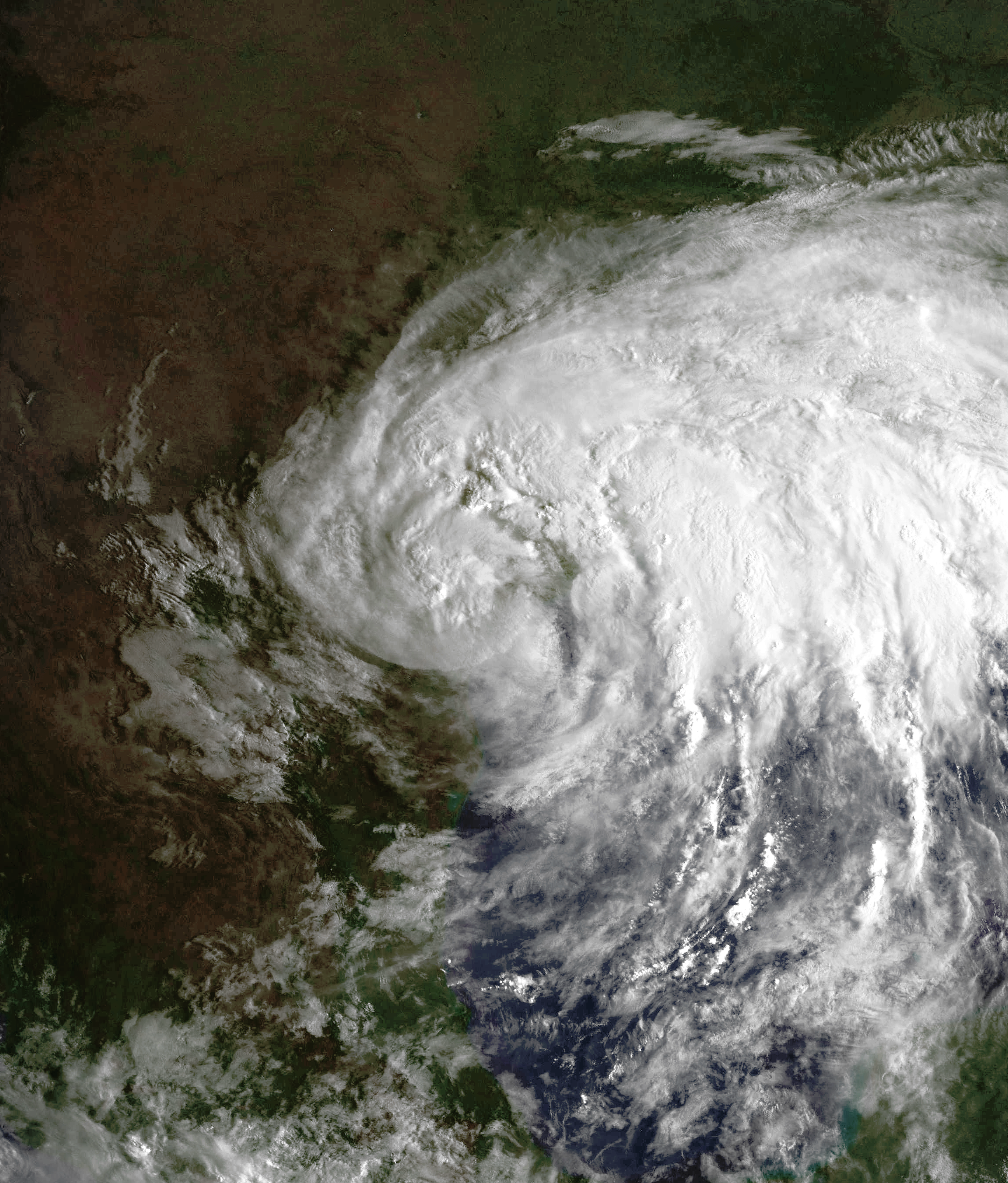
- Duration: September 8 – September 13
- Peak intensity: 65 mph (100 km/h) (1-min); 990 mbar (hPa)

A tropical wave developed into Tropical Depression Six on September 8, while located about 160 miles (260 km) east of Brownsville, Texas. The depression moved south-southwestward and strengthened into Tropical Storm Frances on September 9. Frances then executed a small cyclonic loop, moving westward, southward, and then northeastward. By September 10, the storm moved quickly northward. After re-curving northwestward, Frances peaked with winds of 65 mph (105 km/h) early on September 11, but later then weakened slightly. At 0600 UTC, the storm made landfall near Corpus Christi, Texas with winds of 50 mph (80 km/h). Frances slowly weakened inland and continued northwestward. Early on September 12, it curved northward, while weakening to a tropical depression. The storm degenerated into a remnant area of low pressure at 1800 UTC on September 13, while located over northeastern Texas.

The precursor to Frances produced heavy rainfall in Mexico, peaking at 44.06 inches (1,119 mm) in Escuintla, Chiapas. Severe flooding was also reported in the United States, particularly in Louisiana and Texas. Rainfall from the storm in the United States peaked at 22.39 inches (569 mm) in Terrytown, Louisiana. Flooding was worst in Calcasieu Parish, where over 20 homes in the Deatonville area reported water damage. Tides in Cameron Parish were the highest since Hurricane Carla, causing significant coastal flooding. In Texas, flooding was particularly severe in the eastern portions of the state. More than 1,400 homes and businesses in the Houston area alone were either damaged or destroyed by the floods. In the United States, there was about $500 million in damage, as well as two fatalities in Louisiana.

=== Hurricane Georges ===
- Category 4 hurricane (SSHWS)
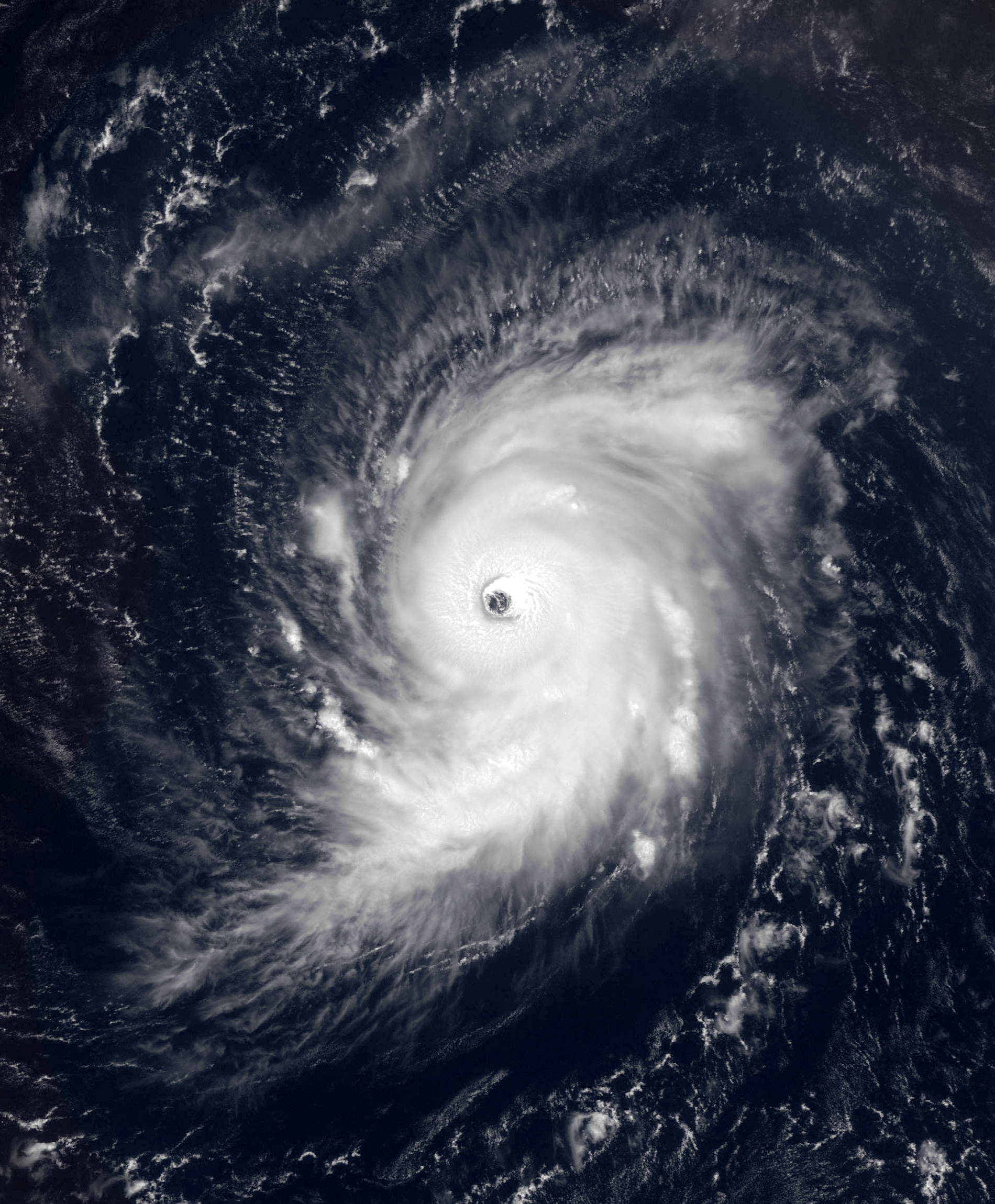
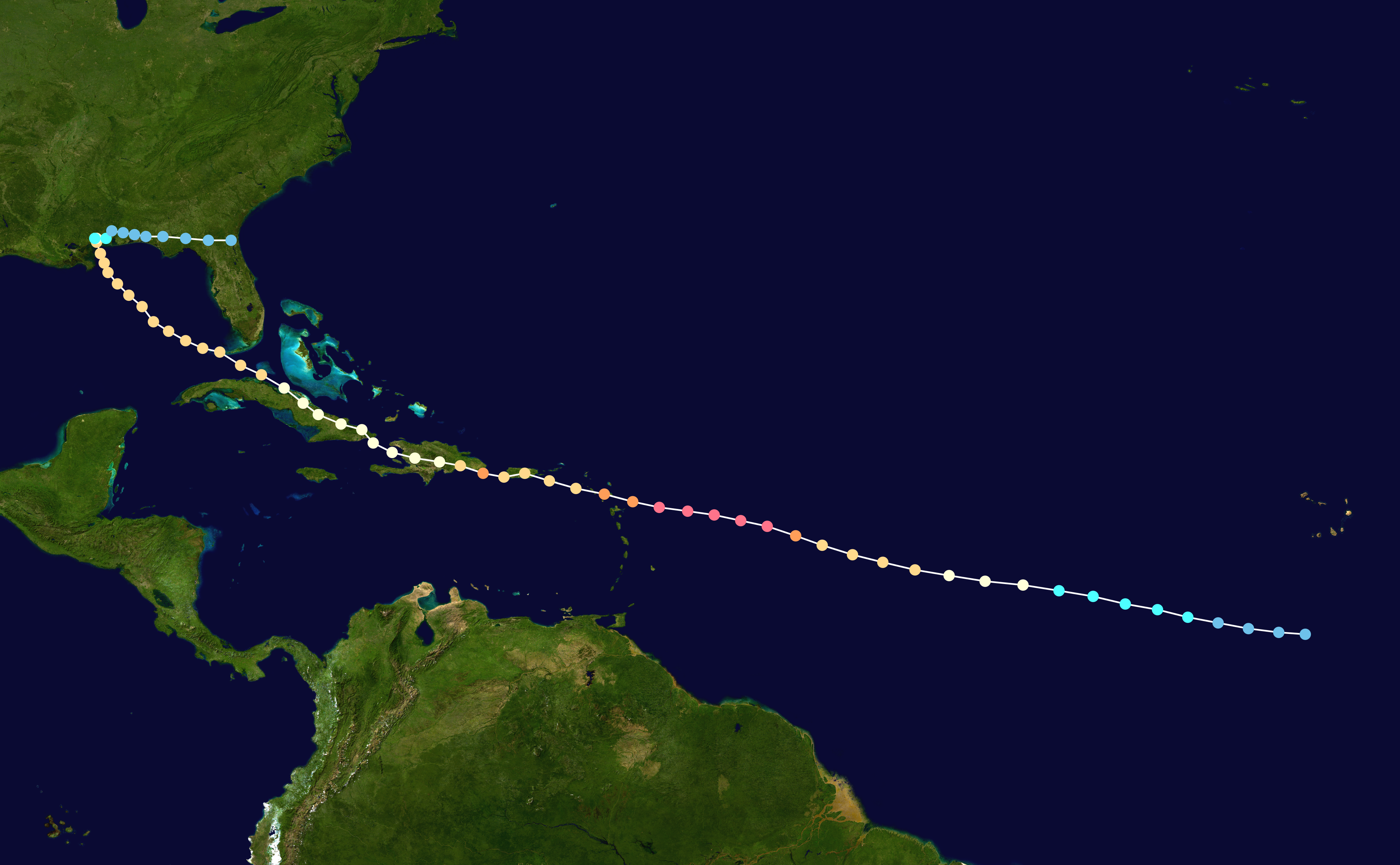
- Duration: September 15 – October 1
- Peak intensity: 155 mph (250 km/h) (1-min); 937 mbar (hPa)

Tropical Depression Seven developed from a tropical wave on September 15, while located south of Cape Verde. It tracked west-northwestward and intensified into Tropical Storm Georges on September 16. Favorable conditions such as warm sea surface temperature and good upper-level outflow allowed the storm to rapidly deepen. By September 20, Georges peaked as a 155 mph (249 km/h) Category 4 hurricane, before increasing vertical wind shear caused it to weaken. The storm's winds were 115 mph (185 km/h) when it made landfall in Antigua, Saint Kitts and Nevis, and Puerto Rico on September 21. Georges made another landfall in the Dominican Republic with winds of 120 mph (190 km/h) on September 22. It weakened significantly over Hispaniola, and late on September 23, Georges struck eastern Cuba with winds of 75 mph (121 km/h). The storm tracked inland near the north coast of Cuba, retaining hurricane-force winds. On September 25, the storm struck Key West with winds of 105 mph (169 km/h). After heading northwestward for three days, Georges struck Biloxi at the same intensity. Georges quickly weakened to a tropical depression on September 29, by which time it turned eastward through the Southeastern United States. By October 1, it dissipated close to the Atlantic Ocean near the Florida-Georgia border.

About 2,125 homes were either damaged or destroyed in Antigua and Barbuda, with property losses reaching $160 million; there were also 3 deaths. Roughly 60% of structures on Saint Kitts were damaged, as were 35% of structures in Nevis. Five deaths and $445 million in damage were reported in Saint Kitts and Nevis. Strong winds and heavy rainfall in Puerto Rico left 96% of the island without electricity, impacted at least 100,610 homes, wiped out more than two-thirds of crops, and caused 8 deaths and $2 billion in losses. Heavy precipitation in Dominican Republic caused mudslides, which left about 155,000 homeless and damaged buildings and road infrastructure. Additionally, it destroyed 55% of crops, caused at least 380 deaths, and left about $1.2 billion in losses. The situation was similar in Haiti, where mudslides left 167,332 people homeless, at least 80% of certain crops ruined, 209 persons dead, and about $179 million in damage. In Cuba, mudslides and strong winds damaged 60,475 homes, of which 3,481 were completely destroyed. Additionally 1,117 businesses were damaged, of which 12 were destroyed. Extensive crops losses also occurred. Six deaths and $305.8 million in damage were reported in Cuba.

Hurricane-force winds in the Florida Keys damaged 1,536 houses and destroyed 173 homes. In the Florida Panhandle, flooding was extensive because of rainfall up to 38.46 inches (977 mm). Many residents were isolated and 132 roads were closed due to flooding. In Alabama, 251 houses, 16 apartment buildings, and 70 businesses experienced significant impacts at Gulf Shore. About 50 houses were destroyed and another 40 were left uninhabitable on Dauphin Island, Alabama. One fatality was reported in Mobile when a woman was driving and slid off the road into a creek. Mississippi bore the brunt of the storm in the United States. Along the coast of Mississippi, more than 1,000 homes were flooded. One of the worst impacted areas inland was Stone County, where 54 homes had minor damage, 26 suffered major damage and 5 were destroyed. Winds also left 230,000 people without electricity. In the state of Mississippi alone, there was approximately $665 million in losses. In Louisiana, the storm caused three indirect deaths, while strong winds and storm surge impacted at least 70 homes, destroyed 85 fishing camps, and left 160,000 people without electricity. Overall, Georges caused at least 615 deaths and roughly $9.37 billion in losses.

=== Tropical Storm Hermine ===
- Tropical storm (SSHWS)
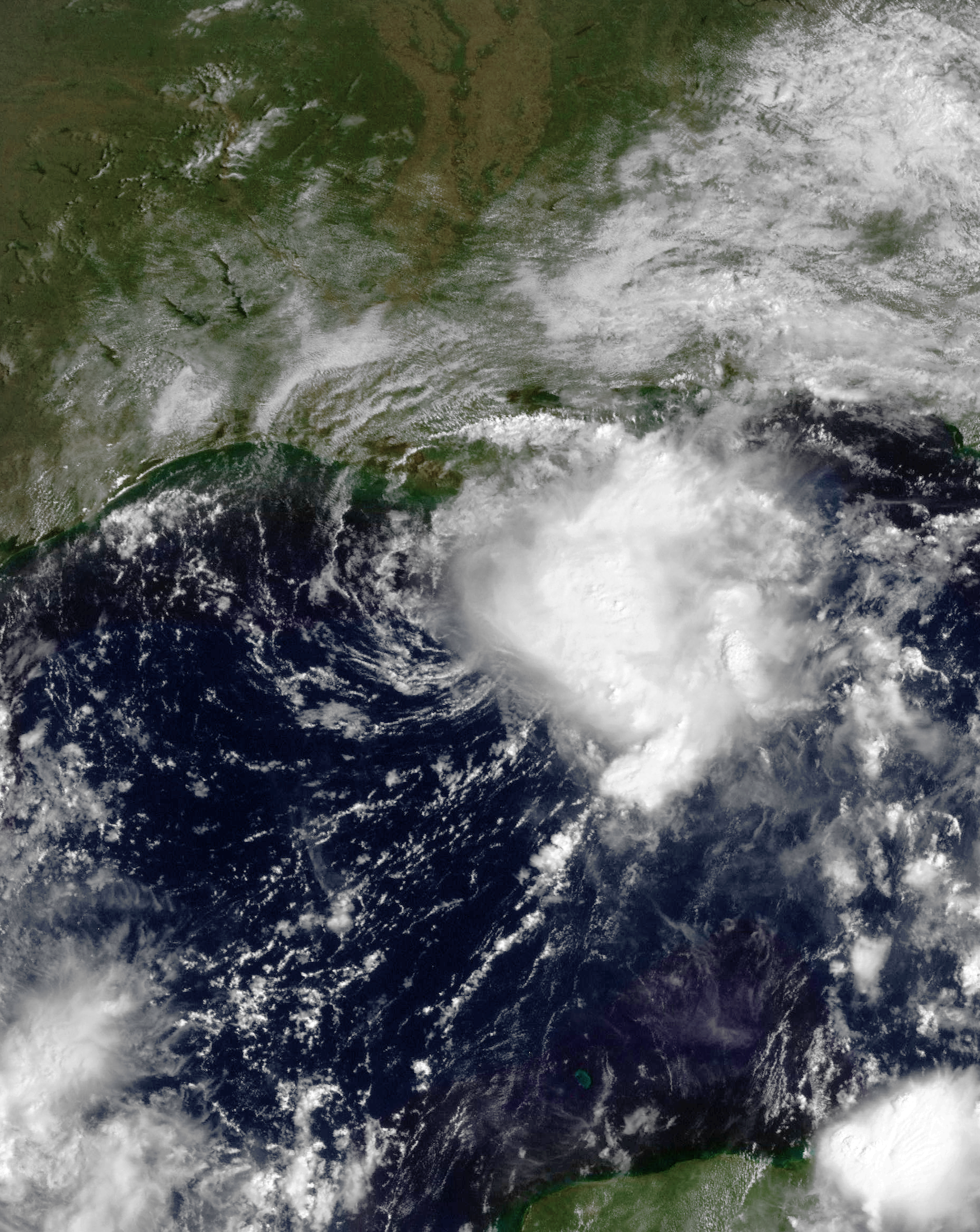
- Duration: September 17 – September 20
- Peak intensity: 45 mph (75 km/h) (1-min); 999 mbar (hPa)

A tropical wave crossed the Africa coast and entered the Atlantic Ocean on September 5. It tracked westward for several days, until curving northwestward in the Caribbean Sea near the coast of South America. By September 16, the system entered the Gulf of Mexico and quickly developed into Tropical Depression Eight on September 17. The depression executed a cyclonic loop, first heading west-southwest, then south, before curving northeast and finally northward. By September 19, the depression intensified into Tropical Storm Hermine. The storm continued north-northeastward until it made landfall near Cocodrie, Louisiana with winds of 45 mph (72 km/h) at 0500 UTC on September 20. Hermine rapidly weakened inland and dissipated in Mississippi late on September 20.

The outer bands of Hermine dropped heavy rainfall throughout Florida. Several traffic accidents occurred as a result, with one man dying after losing control of his vehicle on U.S. Route 441. Effects overall in Louisiana were minimal, mostly minor flooding. At Lake Cataouatche, a man went to untangle debris in his boat propeller and attempted to swim after the boat, but instead drowned. Hermine spawned two tornadoes in Mississippi, one of which destroyed two mobile homes, damaged seven cars, and caused one injury. Locally heavy rainfall left parts of Mississippi Highway 27 and U.S. Route 11 in Alabama under water, stranding several motorists. The remnants of Hermine produced more than 10 inches (250 mm) of rain in Charleston, South Carolina, leaving more than 5 feet (1.5 m) of standing water in some neighborhoods. Overall, the storm caused 2 deaths and $85,000 in damage.

=== Hurricane Ivan ===
- Category 1 hurricane (SSHWS)
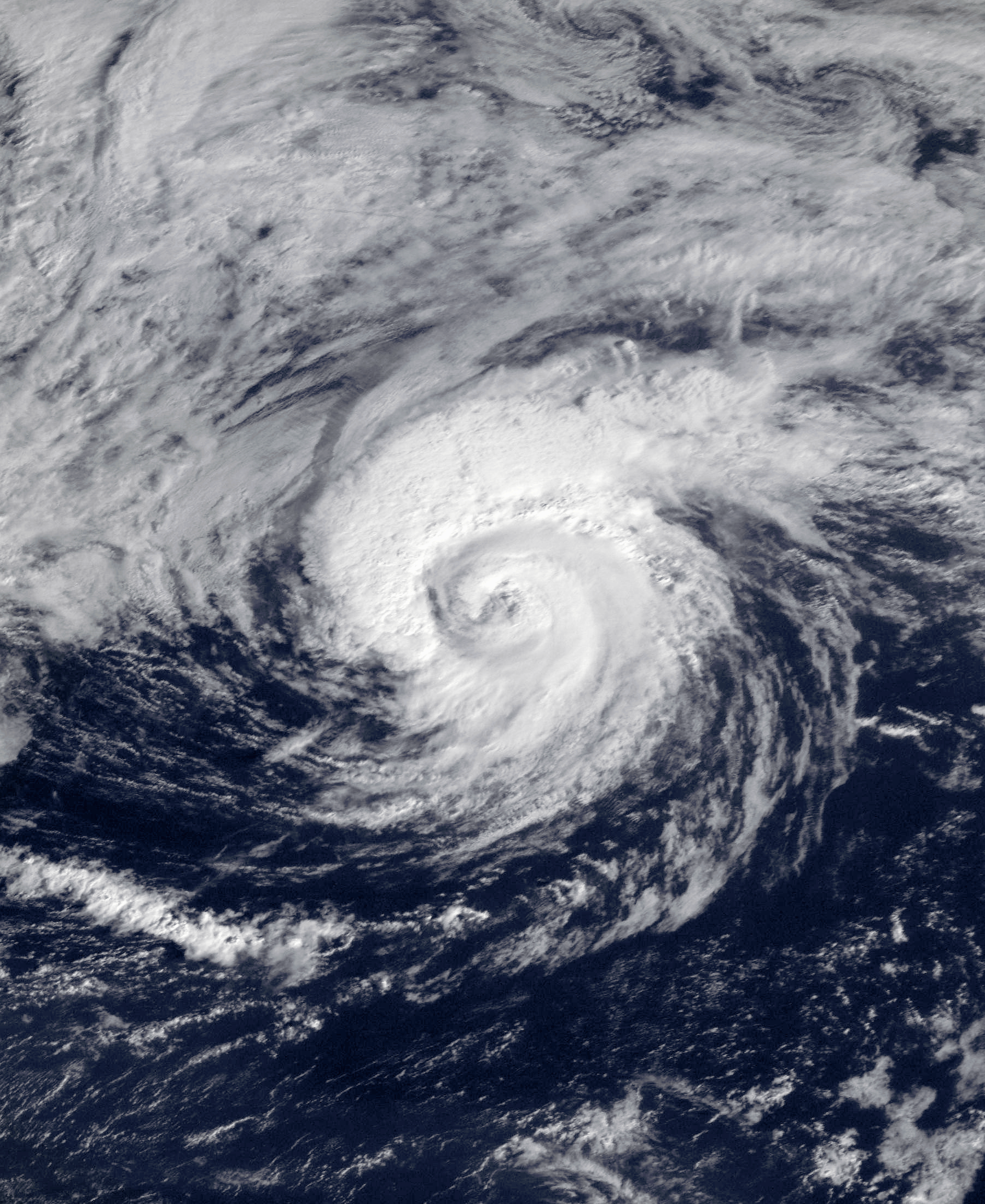
- Duration: September 19 – September 27
- Peak intensity: 90 mph (150 km/h) (1-min); 975 mbar (hPa)

A tropical wave developed over western Africa near the Prime meridian on September 14. Two days later, residual cloudiness and sounding data from Dakar, Senegal, indicated that the system entered the Atlantic Ocean. After the system quickly developed deep convection and improved significantly in organization, it was classified as Tropical Depression Nine starting at 0000 UTC on September 19, while located approximately 200 miles (320 km) southwest of Cape Verde. The depression initially tracked west to west-southwestward with slow intensification, due to vertical wind shear. By September 20, an elongated trough turned the depression northwestward. Later that day, the depression strengthened enough to be upgraded to Tropical Storm Ivan.

On September 21, Ivan re-curved northward, while still in the far eastern Atlantic. While heading north-northwestward on September 23, the storm briefly weakened, but quickly re-strengthened and became a hurricane later that day. Two days later, Ivan began slowly turning northeastward. At 0600 UTC on September 26, Ivan attained its peak intensity with maximum sustained winds of 90 mph (140 km/h) and a minimum atmospheric pressure of 975 mbar (28.8 inHg). As it was tracking east-northeastward, Ivan briefly posed a threat to the Azores, though tropical storm or hurricane-force winds did not impact the archipelago. Shortly thereafter, colder sea surface temperatures weakened Ivan to a tropical storm by early on September 27. Six hours later, the storm transitioned into an extratropical cyclone while northeast of the Azores.

=== Hurricane Jeanne ===
- Category 2 hurricane (SSHWS)
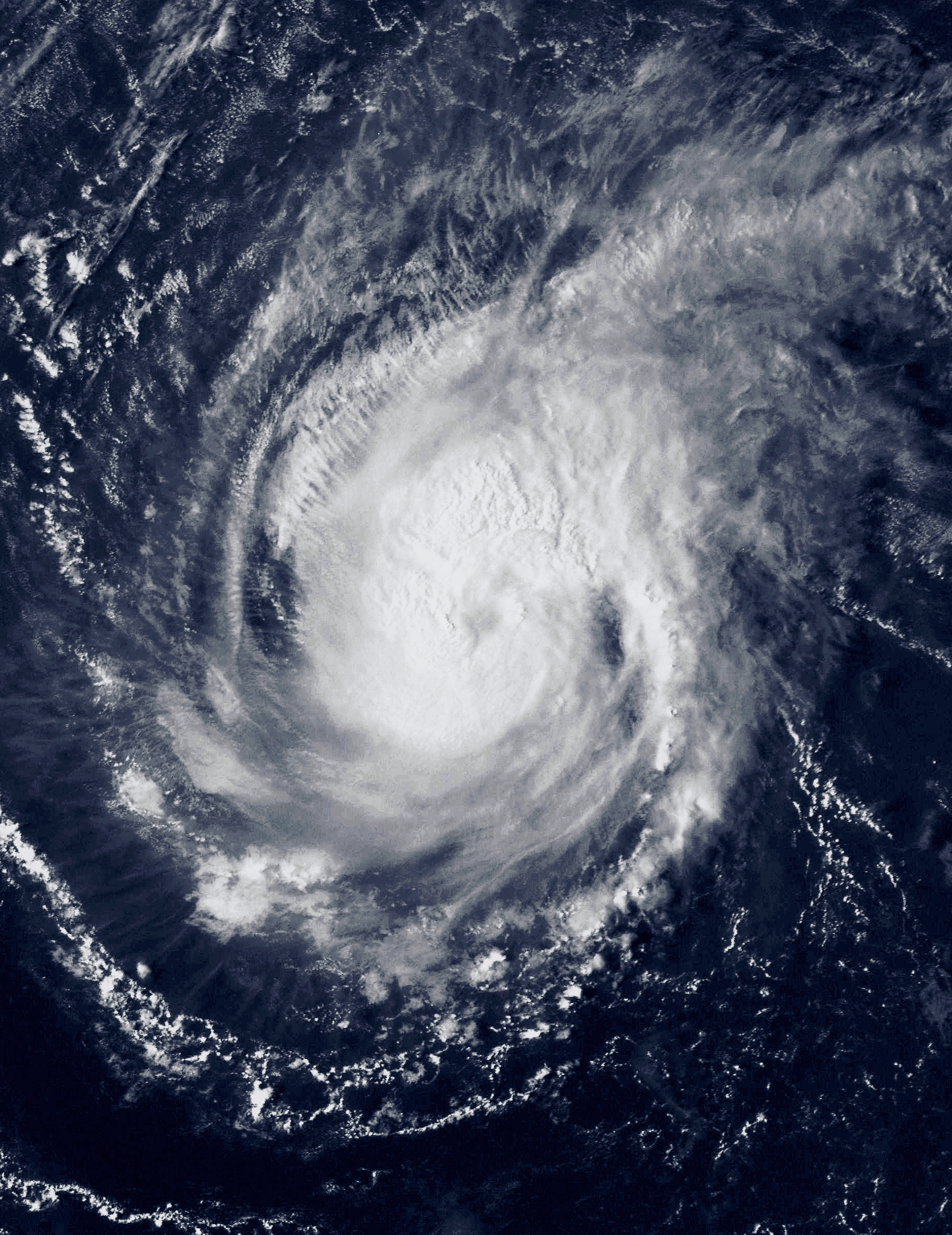
- Duration: September 21 – October 1
- Peak intensity: 105 mph (165 km/h) (1-min); 969 mbar (hPa)

Between September 19 and September 20, a slow-moving tropical wave crossed the west coast of Africa. By the following day, an increase in deep convection allowed it to be classified as Tropical Depression Ten. Forming about 160 miles (260 km) west of Guinea-Bissau, it was the easternmost tropical cyclone development in the Atlantic basin since Tropical Storm Christine in 1973. Due to light wind shear, the depression strengthened into Tropical Storm Jeanne by 1800 UTC on September 21. Further significant intensification occurred and Jeanne became a hurricane about 24 hours later. Late on September 23, the storm became a Category 2 hurricane on the Saffir–Simpson Hurricane Wind Scale. At 1800 UTC on September 24, Jeanne attained its peak intensity with maximum sustained winds of 105 mph (169 km/h) and a minimum barometric pressure of 969 mbar (28.6 inHg).

After peaking as a moderate Category 2 hurricane, an increase in vertical wind shear slowly weakened the storm. Around that time, Jeanne began curving northwestward. By late on September 25, the storm was downgraded back to a Category 1 hurricane. Three days later, a trough forced Jeanne to accelerate toward the north-northeast. It re-strengthened slightly on September 28, though the storm began weakening again. Late on September 29, Jeanne was downgraded to a tropical storm. Shortly before weakening further to a tropical depression on October 1, a wind gust of 40 mph (64 km/h) was reported on Horta in the Azores. The storm then passed through the Azores, but lost tropical characteristics by 1200 UTC on October 1. The remnant extratropical cyclone struck Portugal on October 4 and became unidentifiable over Spain later that day.

=== Hurricane Karl ===
- Category 2 hurricane (SSHWS)
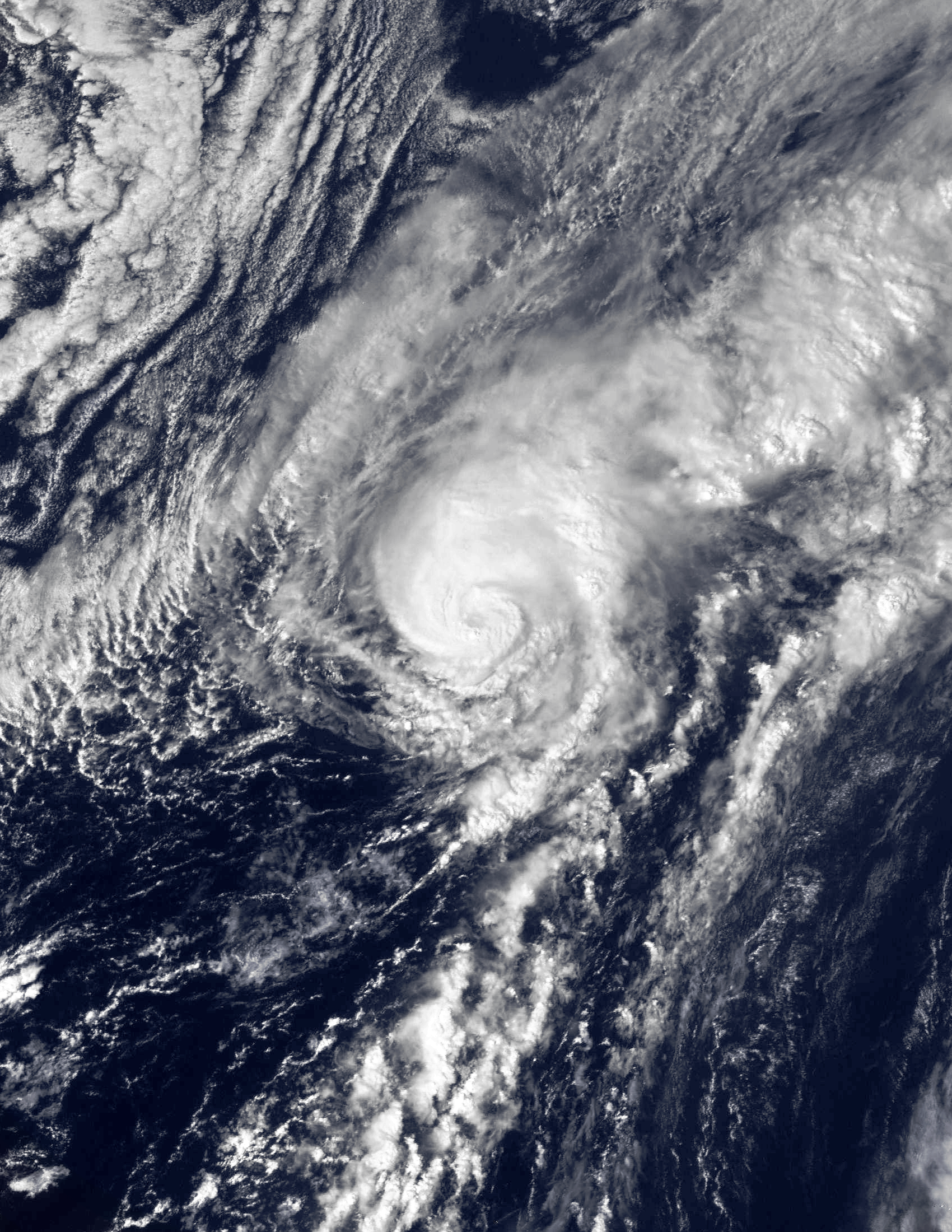
- Duration: September 23 – September 28
- Peak intensity: 105 mph (165 km/h) (1-min); 970 mbar (hPa)

A non-tropical low-pressure system was first noted on the coast of the Carolinas on September 21. Deep convection became better organized, and on September 23, the system was designated as Tropical Depression Eleven while located near Bermuda. Initially, the depression moved quickly towards the east, ahead of a frontal boundary moving off the East Coast of the United States. Early on September 24, the depression was upgraded to Tropical Storm Karl. At the time, the storm began curved east-southeastward and slowed in forward speed. By later that day, westerly and northwesterly wind shear caused the center to become partially exposed from the deep convection. Despite this, Karl strengthened into a hurricane at 1200 UTC on September 25.

In response to a large mid- to upper-level trough, Karl accelerated towards the northeast. Shortly after developing a well-defined eye, the storm reached its peak intensity of 105 mph (169 km/h) at 0000 UTC on September 27. However, wind shear caused Karl to begin weakening. Later on September 27, satellite imagery indicated that the cyclone was beginning to lose tropical characteristics. Deep convective activity was limited to the north and northwest of the center, and the low-level center became separated from the center of the cloud circulation. Karl weakened to a tropical storm at 0000 UTC on September 28, while located near the Azores. Later that day, the storm became extratropical over cooler waters, when the center of circulation became separated from the deep convection. The extratropical remnants were last noted south of Ireland on September 29.

=== Hurricane Lisa ===
- Category 1 hurricane (SSHWS)
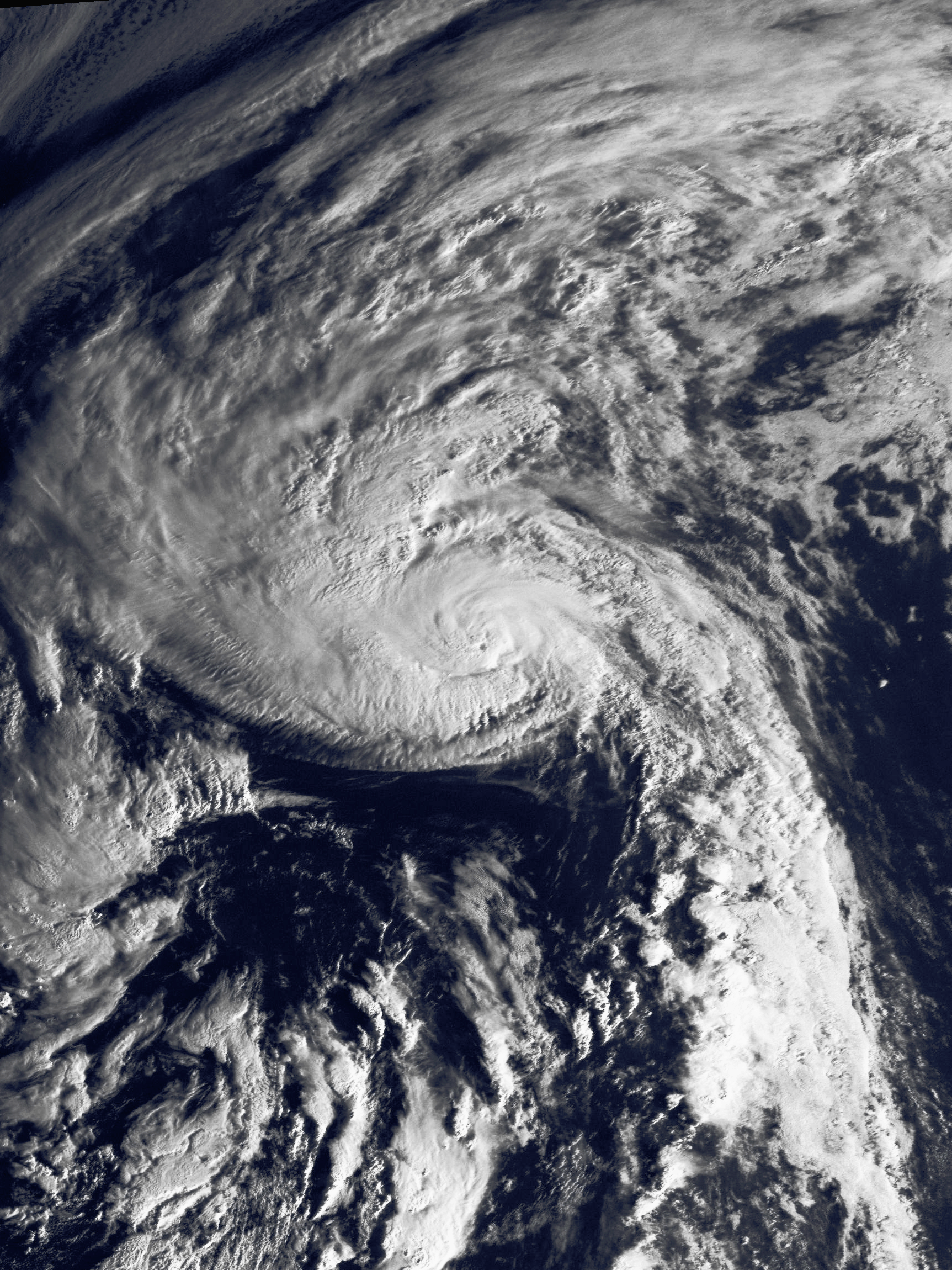
- Duration: October 5 – October 9
- Peak intensity: 75 mph (120 km/h) (1-min); 995 mbar (hPa)

A tropical wave exited the west coast of Africa on September 29. The system soon became unidentifiable within the Intertropical Convergence Zone, preventing quick development. However, by October 3, the system became more distinguishable and better-defined, with a low-level circulation forming on October 4. It was reported that Tropical Depression Twelve formed at 0000 UTC on October 5, while located about midway between Africa and the Lesser Antilles. Although strong wind shear kept the depression disorganized, it was able to intensify into Tropical Storm Lisa about six hours later. Because of unfavorable conditions, further intensification was deemed unlikely. Lisa initially tracked northwestward, though by October 6, an upper-level low-pressure system caused the storm to turn northeastward.

A baroclinic trough within the westerlies transitioned into a deep low, causing Lisa to accelerate starting on October 7. Despite winds of 70 mph (110 km/h) at a buoy and an improved appearance on satellite imagery, no strengthening was predicted. By October 8, convection persisted near the center and banding features developed. Lisa further accelerated, with forward speed reaching over 58 mph (93 km/h) on October 9. Later that day, a deep low to the west and a strong high-pressure system to the east caused Lisa to turn northward. At 1200 UTC on October 9, Lisa unexpectedly strengthened into a hurricane, simultaneously peaking with winds of 75 mph (121 km/h). Later that day, the storm began merging with an extratropical frontal system and eventually became unidentifiable by early on October 10.

=== Hurricane Mitch ===
- Category 5 hurricane (SSHWS)
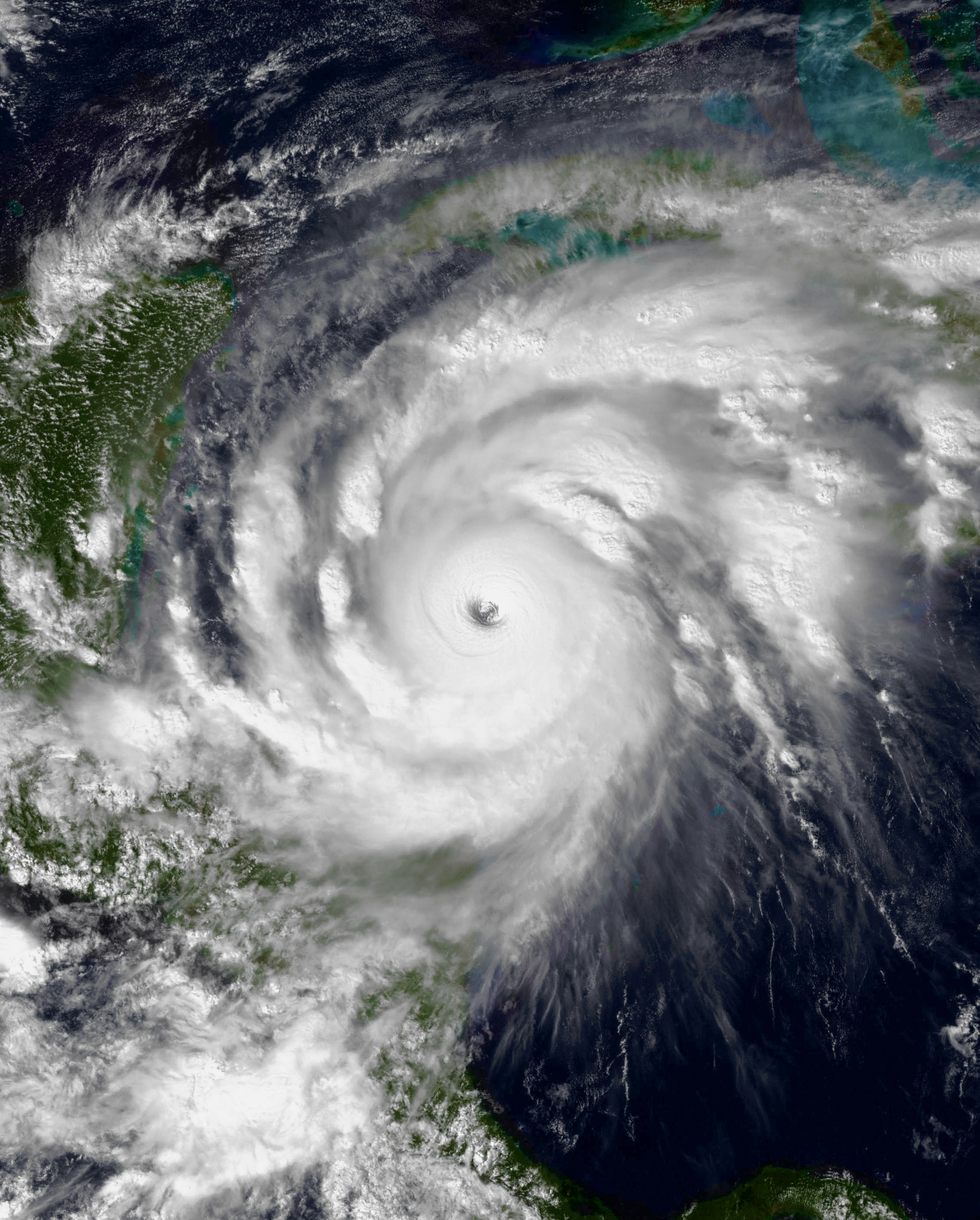
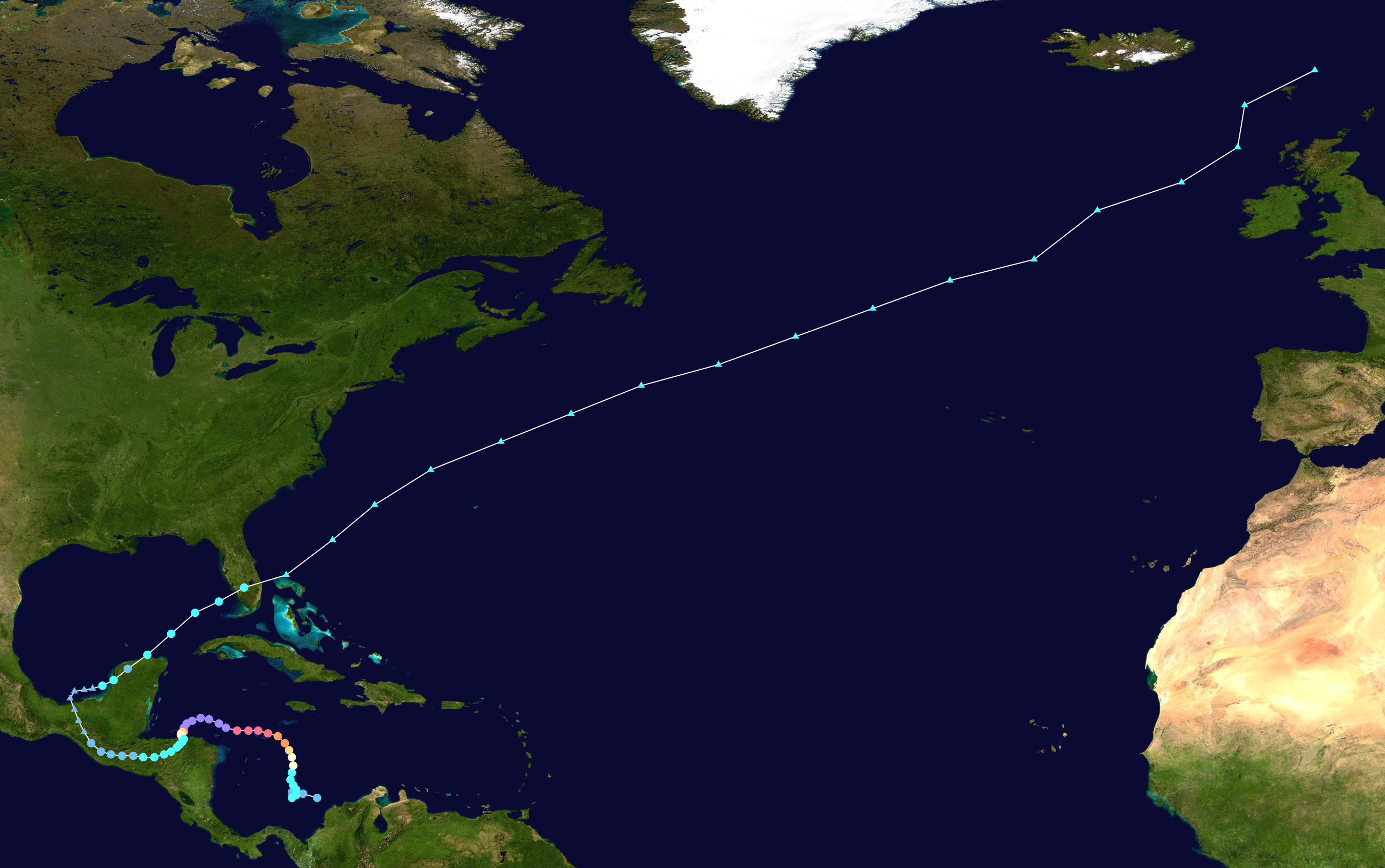
- Duration: October 22 – November 5
- Peak intensity: 180 mph (285 km/h) (1-min); 905 mbar (hPa)

Tropical Depression Thirteen was spawned by a tropical wave on October 22, while located offshore Colombia in the Caribbean Sea. Later that day, the depression became Tropical Storm Mitch, and within two days it intensified into a hurricane. While curving westward, the storm rapidly deepened, reaching its peak as a Category 5 hurricane with winds of 180 mph (290 km/h) and a minimum pressure of 905 mbar (26.7 inHg) late on October 26. Mitch weakened significantly while turning to the south, and on October 29 it moved ashore with winds of 80 mph (130 km/h) east of La Ceiba, Honduras. It quickly weakened to a tropical storm, but did not deteriorate into a tropical depression until October 31 while over Central America. Mitch degenerated into a low-pressure area on November 2 near the border of Mexico and Guatemala, although it was re-designated a tropical storm on November 3, after emerging into the Bay of Campeche. After turning to the northeast, the storm struck the city of Campeche early on November 4, and Mitch briefly weakened into a tropical depression over the Yucatán Peninsula. The storm re-intensified after reaching the Gulf of Mexico again, and Mitch made its final landfall near Naples, Florida with winds of 65 mph (105 km/h) on November 5. Shortly thereafter the storm became extratropical near the northern Bahamas, which lasted several more days while crossing the Atlantic Ocean.

Heavy rainfall in Jamaica flooded numerous houses and caused three fatalities from mudslides. Strong winds, rough seas, and large amounts of precipitation resulted in minor effects in Cuba and the Cayman Islands. Offshore Honduras, the Fantome sank, drowning all 31 people on board. In Honduras, the large and slow-moving storm dropped 35.89 inches (912 mm) of rain, causing the destruction of at least 70% of the country's crops and an estimated 70-80% of road infrastructure. About 25 villages were completely dismantled, while about 33,000 homes were destroyed and another 50,000 were damaged. Damage totaled about $3.8 billion in Honduras and at least 7,000 fatalities were reported. In Nicaragua, rainfall totals may have reached 50 inches (1,300 mm). Over 1,700 miles (2,700 km) of roads required replacement or repairs, while effects to agriculture were significant. Almost 24,000 houses were destroyed and an additional 17,600 were damaged. About 3,800 deaths and $1 billion in damage were reported in Nicaragua. In Costa Rica, the storm impacted 2,135 homes, of which 241 were destroyed. Extensive road infrastructure and crop damage was also reported. There were 7 people killed and $92 million in damage in Costa Rica.

The storm caused flooding as far south as Panama, where three fatalities occurred. Flash flooding and landslides in El Salvador damaged more than 10,000 homes, 1,200 miles (1,900 km) of roadway, and caused heavy losses to crops and livestock. Damage totaled $400 million and 240 deaths were confirmed. Effects were similar but slightly more significant in Guatemala, where 6,000 houses were destroyed and an additional 20,000 were impacted to some degree. Additionally, 840 miles (1,350 km) of roads were affected, with nearly 400 miles (640 km) of it being major highways. Crop damage in Guatemala alone was nearly $500 million. It was reported that 268 deaths and $748 million in losses occurred in Guatemala. The storm caused relatively minor effects in Mexico and Belize, with 9 and 11 fatalities in both countries, respectively. Mitch brought tropical storm winds to South Florida and rainfall up to 11.20 inches (284 mm). In the Florida Keys, several buildings that were damaged by Georges were destroyed by Mitch. Tornadoes in the state spawned by Mitch damaged or destroyed 645 houses. The storm caused two fatalities and $40 million in damage in Florida. Overall, Mitch caused $6.08 billion in losses and at least 11,374 people were left dead.

=== Hurricane Nicole ===
- Category 1 hurricane (SSHWS)
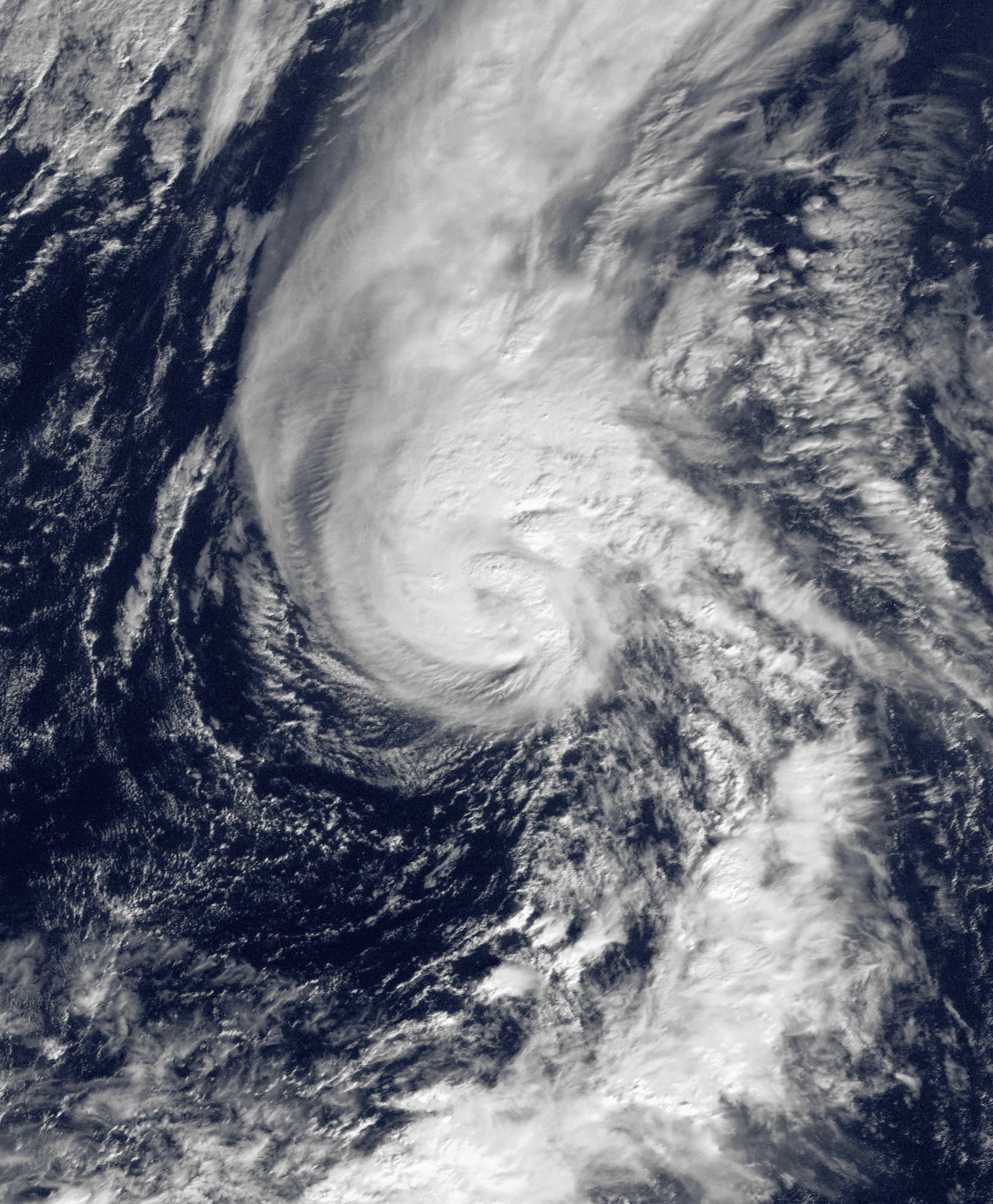
- Duration: November 24 – December 1
- Peak intensity: 85 mph (140 km/h) (1-min); 979 mbar (hPa)

An intense frontal low that persisted near the Canary Islands gradually acquired tropical characteristics and a low-level circulation. Tropical Depression Fourteen developed at 0000 UTC on November 24, while located about 615 miles (990 km) west-southwest of La Palma, Canary Islands. Due to light wind shear, Nicole was able to strengthen swiftly while tracking west-southwestward, reaching winds of 70 mph (110 km/h) later that day. However, on November 25, wind shear increased, causing the storm to weaken. By 1200 UTC on November 26, Nicole was downgraded to a tropical depression. The low-level circulation became almost entirely devoid of deep convection. As a result, the National Hurricane Center discontinued advisories on Nicole at 1500 UTC on November 26 and did not forecast re-development. However, post-analysis indicates that Nicole remained a tropical cyclone.

At 1500 UTC on November 27, the National Hurricane Center resumed advisories after Nicole unexpectedly "regenerated". Deep convection began re-developing and about three hours later, Nicole was upgraded back to a tropical storm. Under the influence of a cold front, Nicole curved northeastward starting on November 27. While crossing sea surface temperatures that were 2 to 3 °C (36 to 37 °F) above normal, the storm began to significantly intensify. After development of an eye and increasing satellite intensity estimates, Nicole was upgraded to a hurricane early on November 30. Twenty-four hours later, Nicole attained its peak intensity with a maximum sustained wind speed of 85 mph (137 km/h) and a minimum atmospheric pressure of 979 mbar (28.9 inHg). However, Nicole weakened to a tropical storm later on December 1, while also losing tropical characteristics. By 1800 UTC that day, the storm transitioned into an extratropical cyclone while located northwest of the Azores. Nicole was the most intense Atlantic storm recorded in the month of December.

== Storm names ==
The following list of names was used for named storms that formed in the North Atlantic in 1998. This is the same list used in the 1992 season, with the exception of Alex, which replaced Andrew. The names Alex, Lisa, Mitch, and Nicole were used for the first (and only in the case of Mitch) time this year.

- Alex
- Bonnie
- Charley
- Danielle
- Earl
- Frances
- Georges
- Hermine
- Ivan
- Jeanne
- Karl
- Lisa
- Mitch
- Nicole
- Otto (unused)
- Paula (unused)
- Richard (unused)
- Shary (unused)
- Tomas (unused)
- Virginie (unused)
- Walter (unused)

=== Retirement ===
The World Meteorological Organization retired the names Georges and Mitch in the spring of 1999 from the Atlantic hurricane name lists due to the damage and number of deaths each one caused and they will never be used again for Atlantic tropical cyclones. They were replaced by Gaston and Matthew for the 2004 season.

== Season effects ==
This is a table of all of the storms that formed in the 1998 Atlantic hurricane season. It includes their name, duration, peak classification and intensities, areas affected, damage, and death totals. Deaths in parentheses are additional and indirect (an example of an indirect death would be a traffic accident), but were still related to that storm. Damage and deaths include totals while the storm was extratropical, a wave, or a low, and all of the damage figures are in 1998 USD.

Saffir–Simpson scale
TD	TS	C1	C2	C3	C4	C5

1998 North Atlantic tropical cyclone season statistics
Storm name	Dates active	Storm category at peak intensity	Max 1-min wind mph (km/h)	Min. press. (mbar)	Areas affected	Damage (US$)	Deaths	Ref(s).
Alex	July 27 – August 2	Tropical storm	50 (85)	1000	None	None	None	
Bonnie	August 19 – 30	Category 3 hurricane	115 (185)	954	Southeastern United States, Mid-Atlantic, Massachusetts, Atlantic Canada	$1 billion	5	
Charley	August 21 – 24	Tropical storm	70 (110)	1000	Louisiana, Texas, Mexico	$50 million	20	
Danielle	August 24 – September 3	Category 2 hurricane	105 (165)	960	Puerto Rico, East Coast of the United States, Atlantic Canada, United Kingdom	$50,000	None	
Earl	August 31 – September 3	Category 2 hurricane	100 (155)	985	Mexico, Southeastern United States	$79 million	3	
Frances	September 8 – 13	Tropical storm	65 (100)	990	Mexico, Florida, Gulf Coast of the United States, Midwestern United States, New York, New England	$500 million	1 (1)	
Georges	September 15 – October 1	Category 4 hurricane	155 (250)	937	Lesser Antilles, Greater Antilles, Southern United States	$9.37 billion	615	
Hermine	September 17 – 20	Tropical storm	45 (75)	999	Louisiana, Mississippi, Alabama	$85,000	0 (2)	
Ivan	September 19 – 27	Category 1 hurricane	90 (150)	975	None	None	None	
Jeanne	September 21 – October 1	Category 2 hurricane	105 (165)	969	Spain, Portugal	None	None	
Karl	September 23 – 28	Category 2 hurricane	105 (165)	970	None	None	None	
Lisa	October 5 – October 9	Category 1 hurricane	75 (120)	995	None	None	None	
Mitch	October 22 – November 5	Category 5 hurricane	180 (285)	905	Cayman Islands, Cuba, Jamaica, Central America, Mexico, Florida, Ireland	$6.08 billion	≥ 11,374	
Nicole	November 24 – December 1	Category 1 hurricane	85 (140)	979	None	None	None	
Season aggregates
14 systems	July 27 – December 1		180 (285)	905		$17.080 billion	12,018 (3)	

== See also ==
- Tropical cyclones in 1998
- 1998 Pacific hurricane season
- 1998 Pacific typhoon season
- 1998 North Indian Ocean cyclone season
- South-West Indian Ocean cyclone seasons: 1997–98, 1998–99
- Australian region cyclone seasons: 1997–98, 1998–99
- South Pacific cyclone seasons: 1997–98, 1998–99
- South Atlantic tropical cyclone
- Mediterranean tropical-like cyclone
