= Meteorological history of Hurricane Georges =

Hurricane Georges
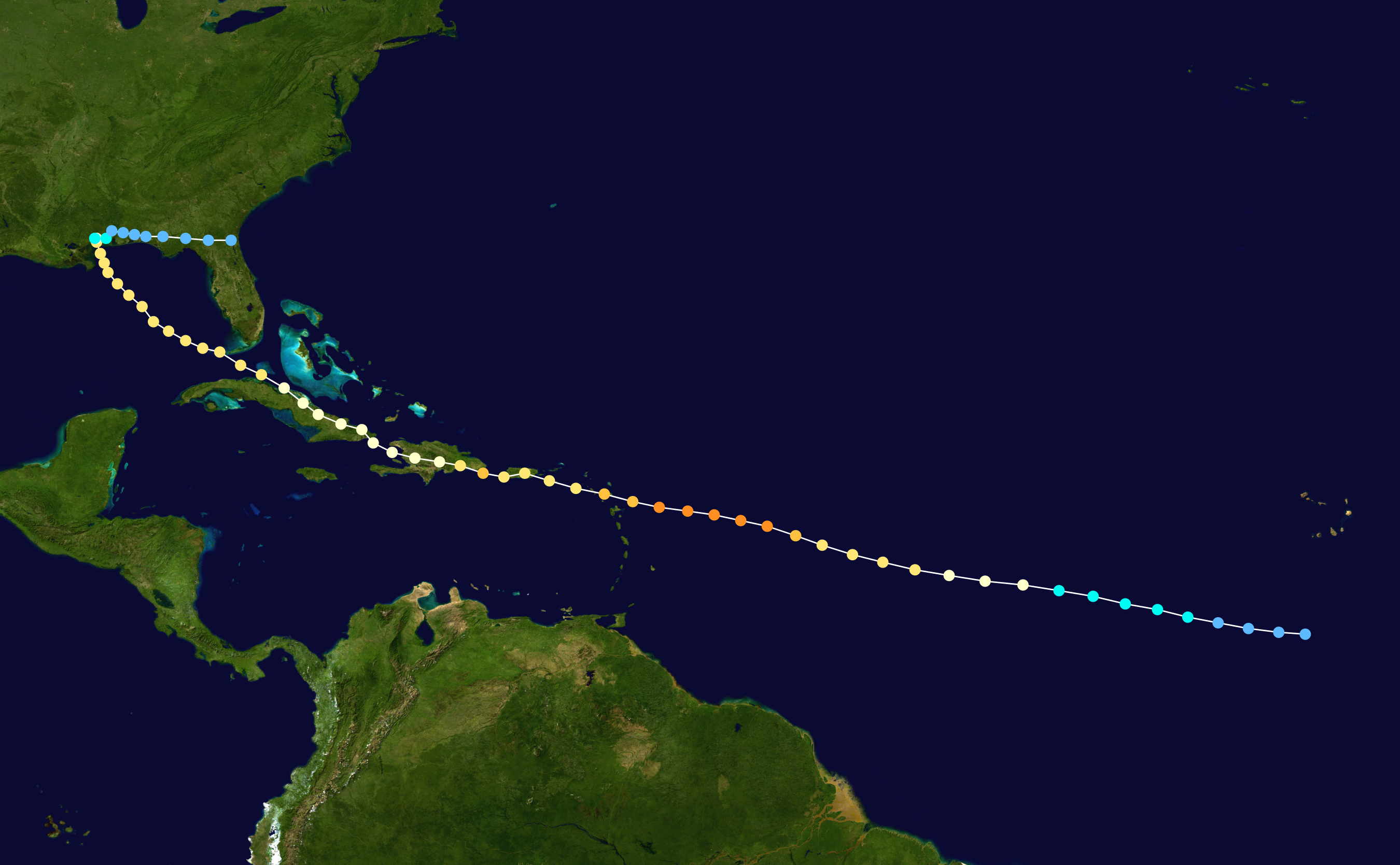
- Track of Hurricane Georges

Meteorological history
- Formed: September 15, 1998
- Dissipated: October 1, 1998

Category 4 major hurricane
- 1-minute sustained (SSHWS/NWS)
- Highest winds: 155 mph (250 km/h)
- Lowest pressure: 937 mbar (hPa); 27.67 inHg

Overall effects
- Areas affected: Leeward Islands, Puerto Rico, Dominican Republic, Haiti, Cuba, Florida Keys, Mississippi, Alabama, Southeastern Louisiana, Florida Panhandle
- Part of the 1998 Atlantic hurricane season
- History: Meteorological history; Effects: Lesser Antilles; Puerto Rico; Dominican Republic; Haiti; Cuba; United States; Florida; Louisiana; Tornado outbreak; Other wikis: Commons: Georges images

The meteorological history of Hurricane Georges spanned seventeen days from September 15 to October 1, 1998. Hurricane Georges began as a tropical wave that moved off the coast of Africa during mid-September 1998. Tracking westward, the wave spawned an area of low pressure two days later, which quickly strengthened into a tropical depression. On September 16, the depression was upgraded to Tropical Storm Georges, and to Hurricane Georges the next day. Over the next few days, an eye developed and deep Atmospheric convection persisted around it. Strong outflow and warm sea surface temperatures allowed the storm to intensify as it tracked towards the west-northwest. The storm reached its peak intensity on September 20 with winds of 155 mph (250 km/h), just below Category 5 status on the Saffir–Simpson hurricane scale, and a barometric pressure of 937 mbar (hPa; 27.67 inHg).

Over the following five days, the hurricane tracked through the Greater Antilles, making five landfalls, four as a Category 3 hurricane and one as a Category 1. Shortly after entering the Caribbean, the Georges weakened slightly; however, shortly before crossing Puerto Rico, the storm re-attained major hurricane status. After weakening slightly once more, the storm rapidly organized near the Dominican Republic. A well-defined eye formed and outflow re-established, allowing the storm to reach an intensity of 120 mph (195 km/h) just prior to landfall. During its passage of Hispaniola the circulation was severely disrupted, but Georges maintained hurricane-intensity. On September 23, the storm made landfall in southeastern Cuba as a minimal hurricane.

By September 25, Georges entered the Gulf of Mexico and intensified into a Category 2 hurricane. The storm re-organized over the gulf, with the eye fully reforming and deep convection persisting around the center of circulation. By September 27, Georges reached an intensity of 110 mph (175 km/h). Several hours prior to landfall the next day, the hurricane weakened slightly and tracked inland near Biloxi, Mississippi with winds of 105 mph (170 km/h). Upon landfall, the hurricane's forward motion slowed, executing a brief clockwise loop before maintaining an eastward drift. Gradually weakening, the hurricane was only a tropical depression by the afternoon of September 29. Two days later, Georges fully dissipated near the Atlantic coast of Florida.

== Formation and intensification ==
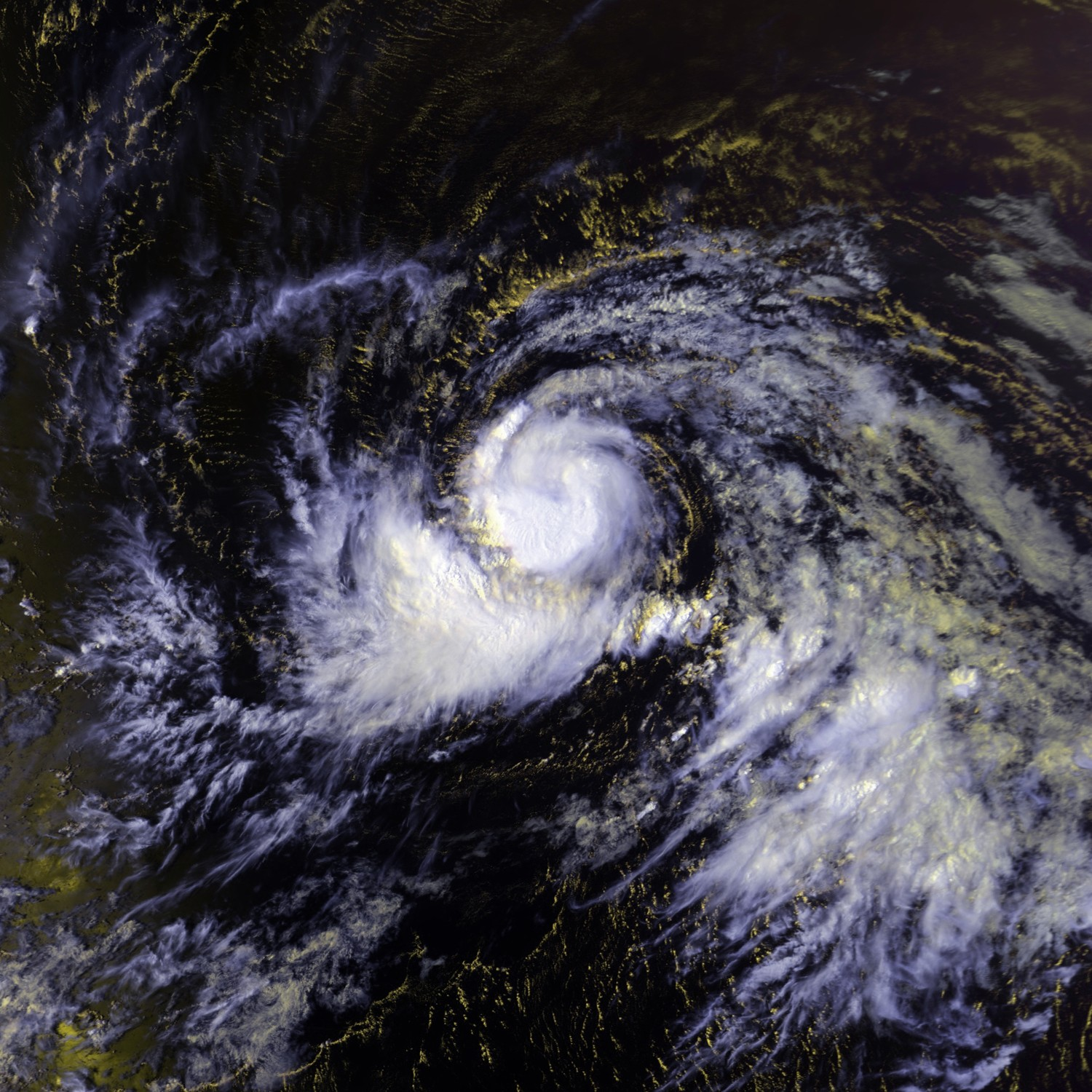
Tropical Storm Georges just prior to attaining hurricane-status

Late on September 13, 1998, a tropical wave exited the west coast of Africa. The following day the system featured a large area of organized deep convection and the dvorak technique was initiated. By September 15, ships within the vicinity of the wave reported that a surface circulation had developed and by 1200 UTC, the National Hurricane Center (NHC) estimated that a tropical depression, the seventh of the season, while situated about 345 miles (555 kilometres) south-southwest of the Cape Verde Islands. The depression tracked roughly due west in response to a mid-level ridge, building westward, to the north of the cyclone. Throughout the day, banding features developed around the system and deep convection consolidated around the center of circulation. Roughly 24 hours after being declared a depression, the NHC upgraded the system to a tropical storm and gave it the name Georges.

For the following ten days, Georges maintained a general west-northwest track for ten days due to a persistent mid to upper-level tropospheric ridge. Gradual intensification took place as the system developed strong outflow and warm sea surface temperatures aided in fueling further development. Easterly wind shear caused disruption of the storms' outflow; however, the center, previously surrounded by two deep areas of convection, was situated underneath one area of thunderstorm activity. By the late morning hours of September 17, an eyewall developed within the circulation, indicating that Georges was nearing hurricane-status.

== Peak intensity and Lesser Antilles ==
Later on September 17, a banding-eye feature appeared on satellite imagery, leading the NHC to upgrade Georges into a hurricane at 1800 UTC that day. The next day, an anticyclone began to develop over the hurricane, enhancing the storms' outflow. Several hours later, Georges attained Category 2 status as sustained winds around the eye increased to 100 mph (160 km/h). Ahead of the storm, the NHC reported that there were no factors inhibiting further intensification and anticipated Georges to strengthen into a Category 4 hurricane before reaching the Lesser Antilles. A concentric eyewall began to develop late on September 18, briefly stalling the strengthening of the storm. This resulted from an eyewall replacement cycle that led to the formation of a larger eye.

Hurricane Georges near peak intensity

On September 19 and 20, Georges underwent a period of rapid intensification, in which winds increased by 45 mph (70 km/h) in a 24-hour span. At the end of this phase, Georges attained its peak intensity with winds of 155 mph (250 km/h) and a barometric pressure of 937 mbar (hPa; 27.67 inHg), just below Category 5 status. At the time of peak intensity, a Hurricane Hunter mission into the storm recorded flight-level winds up to 168 mph (270 km/h) while dropsondes measured surface winds up to 175 mph (280 km/h). One of the readings from a dropsonde, that was disregarded, recorded winds of 191 mph (307 km/h) in the lower-levels of the eyewall. This reading was disregarded by the hurricane hunters as it seemed too high and not representative of the actual intensity of Georges. The hurricane hunters also noted a large increase in the radius of tropical storm-force winds, prompting the issuance of tropical storm warnings in the Lesser Antilles. Around the time of peak intensity, the eye of Georges was roughly 35 mi (55 km) in diameter.

Shortly after attaining peak intensity on September 20, Georges began to weaken, as upper-level vertical wind shear caused the eye to become cloud-filled and was no longer visible on satellite imagery. Convection associated with the storm also became less symmetric in nature. In spite of these factors, Georges remained a major hurricane through September 21. Continued weakening took place as the shear restricted a portion of the hurricane's outflow. At 0430 UTC on September 21, Georges made its initial landfall on Antigua with winds of 115 mph (185 km/h). Several hours later, the storm passed directly over St. Kitts. Shortly after passing over the island, the storm weakened to Category 2 status and winds decreased to 110 mph (175 km/h).

== Caribbean islands ==
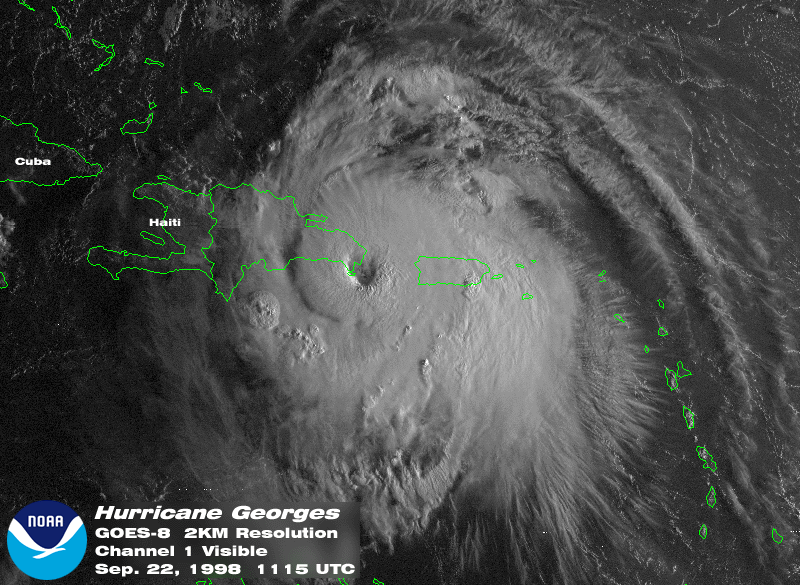
Hurricane Georges making landfall in the Dominican Republic

As the storm approached Puerto Rico late on September 21, the wind shear began to relent, allowing Georges to re-organize; however, its outflow was unable to fully redevelop due to its proximity to land. Around 2200 UTC, the storm reattained Category 3 intensity and made landfall in Puerto Rico with winds of 115 mph (185 km/h) before weakening again. Hours later, the storm entered the Mona Passage and began to once again reorganize. As Georges approached the Dominican Republic, it unexpectedly developed a well-defined eye and began to intensify, attaining winds of 120 mph (195 km/h); satellite imagery suggested that Georges re-attained Category 4 intensity. It made landfall on the Dominican Republic at 1230 UTC on September 22 as a Category 3 hurricane.

Hispaniola's mountainous terrain was a large factor in the expected weakening of the storm; however, by six hours after landfall, the storm's eye maintained its structure, outflow remained strong, and banding features were still organized. By September 23, however, the center became ill-defined and hurricane hunters were unable to fly into the storm until it moved back over water. The hurricane's core was severely disrupted by the 10,000 ft (3,000 m) mountains of Hispaniola. Although Georges was exceptionally disorganized, it retained minimal hurricane intensity throughout its passage of the island.

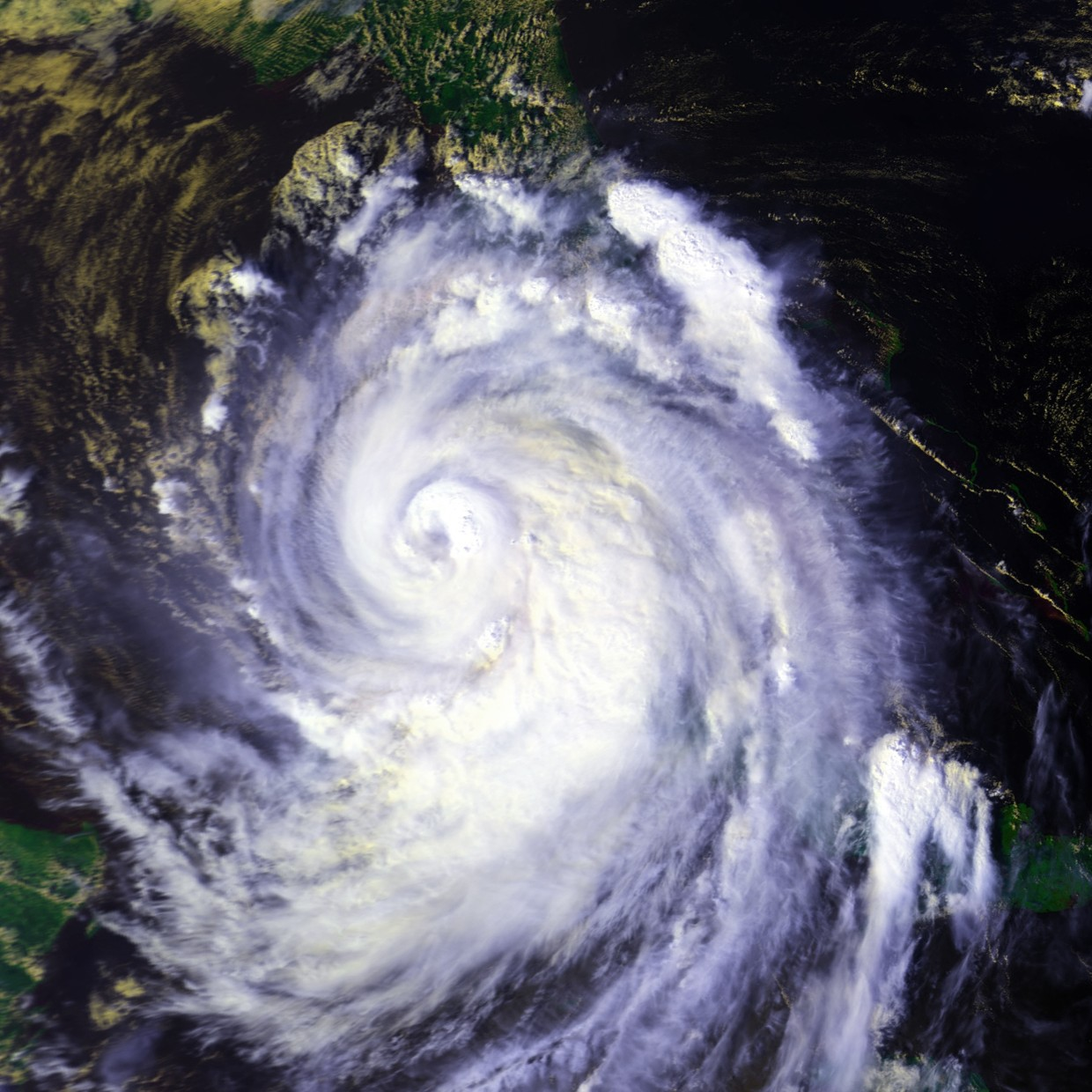
Hurricane Georges over the Florida Keys

Later on September 23, the storm entered the Windward Passage, maintaining a broad circulation with well-defined banding and an eye-like feature. Little change occurred during the day; the storm made its fifth landfall near Guantanamo Bay, Cuba with winds of 75 mph (120 km/h). The storm began to take a more northwesterly track in response to a mid- to upper-level high-pressure area to the northeast and a mid- to upper-level low over the Yucatán Peninsula. Throughout its passage across Cuba, Georges maintained a well-defined outflow pattern despite having an ill-defined center. By September 24, the storm moved over water north of Cuba, and the eyewall quickly began to redevelop.

== Gulf of Mexico and dissipation ==
As the hurricane neared the Florida Keys on September 25, its eye reformed and became more pronounced on satellite imagery. The reorganization led to an increase in intensity, and at about 1530 UTC, Georges made landfall near Key West with winds of 105 mph (170 km/h). The hurricane's forward motion shifted to west-northwest, and forecast models indicated that Georges would re-attain Category 3 status before making landfall along the northern Gulf Coast. The slow motion of the storm led to an erratic track, mainly caused by westward wobbles of the eye. Vertical wind shear was estimated at up to 35 mph (55 km/h), restricting outflow within the hurricane and confining the most intense convection to the eastern side of the circulation.

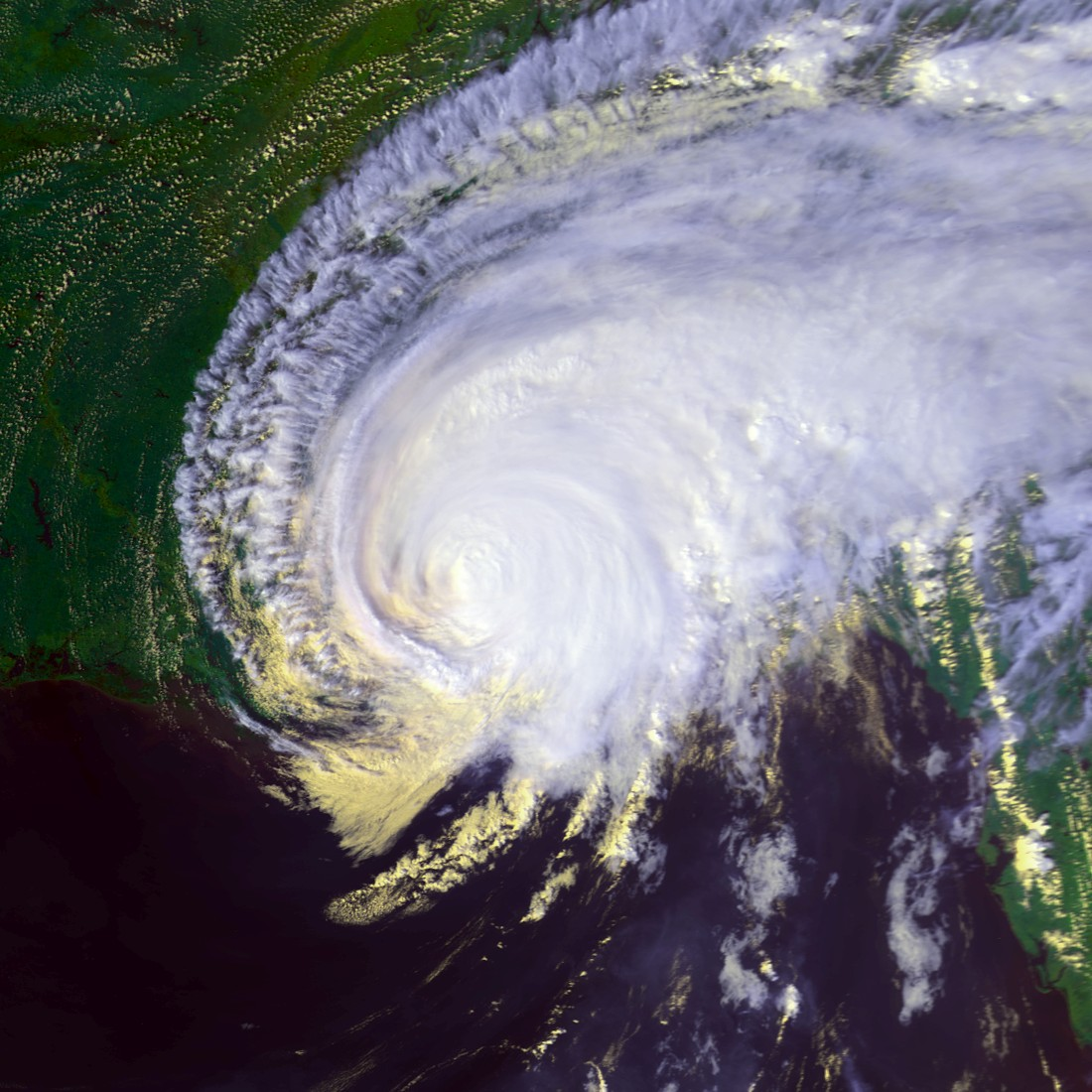
Hurricane Georges several hours after landfall near Biloxi, Mississippi on September 28

Between September 26 and 27, the storm continued to slow while turning northwestward. Its wind field became asymmetric during the afternoon of September 26, with hurricane-force winds present only in the eastern side. Later in the day, winds around the center increased to 110 mph (175 km/h), just short of major hurricane status. The possibility of rapid intensification at the time was low.

The central barometric pressure continued to decrease through September 28, bottoming out at 961 mbar (hPa; 28.38 inHg). By that time, the storm had become visible on New Orleans, Louisiana, radar imagery, which depicted an incomplete eyewall. The storm continued to slow as it neared its final landfall, and winds around the eyewall slightly decreased. Around 1130 UTC, Georges made landfall near Biloxi, Mississippi with winds of 105 mph (170 km/h). Several hours after moving ashore, Georges weakened to Category 1 status and became quasi-stationary. The storm's slow movement led to extreme amounts of rainfall throughout the southeastern United States, peaking at 38.46 in (977 mm) in Munson, Florida.

By September 29, Georges had weakened to a tropical storm and completed a small counter-clockwise loop over southern Mississippi. Subsequently, the storm began tracking west-northwestward at a faster pace. Around 1200 UTC, Georges weakened to a tropical depression, and the NHC issued their final advisory on the system. At this time, the Hydrometeorological Prediction Center (HPC) initiated public advisories. The depression maintained a well-defined circulation as it tracked close to the Gulf of Mexico; however, the center of circulation remained inland. Large quantities of tropical moisture fed the storm, allowing it to produce torrential rainfall. By September 30, the low-level circulation began to detach from the upper-level circulation. The HPC issued their final advisory on the depression early on October 1 as it neared the Atlantic Ocean, and it fully dissipated several hours later.

== See also ==
- Hurricane Georges
- 1998 Atlantic hurricane season
