= Effects of Hurricane Georges in the Dominican Republic =

Hurricane Georges
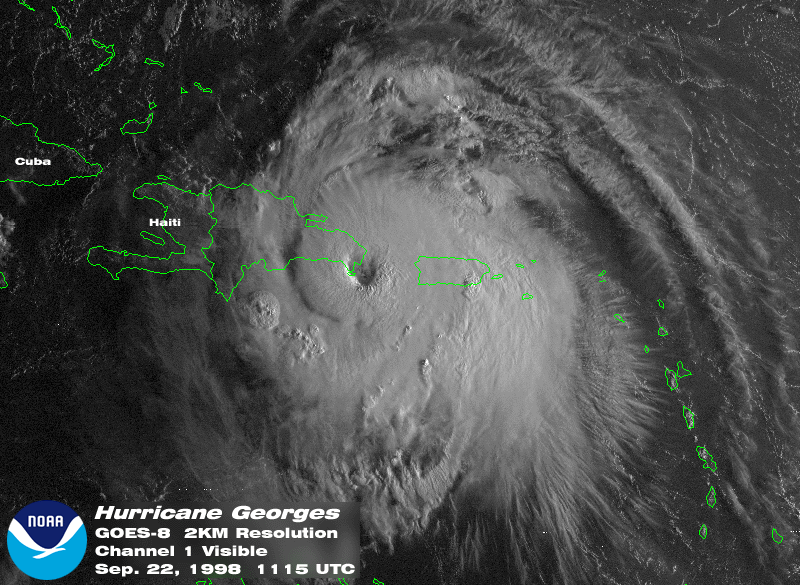
- Georges at landfall in the Dominican Republic

Meteorological history
- Date: September 22, 1998

Category 3 major hurricane
- 1-minute sustained (SSHWS/NWS)
- Highest winds: 120 mph (195 km/h)
- Lowest pressure: 962 mbar (hPa); 28.41 inHg

Overall effects
- Fatalities: 380 direct
- Missing: 58
- Damage: $1.2 billion (1998 USD)
- Areas affected: Dominican Republic
- Part of the 1998 Atlantic hurricane season
- History: Meteorological history; Effects: Lesser Antilles; Puerto Rico; Dominican Republic; Haiti; Cuba; United States; Florida; Louisiana; Tornado outbreak; Other wikis: Commons: Georges images

The effects of Hurricane Georges in the Dominican Republic were some of the worst in its recorded history. Georges produced $1 billion of damage to the island and killed over 380 people. 7000 people evacuated to six shelters in the capital city of Santo Domingo. Supplies came from countries including the United States, France, Spain, Italy, Canada, Chile and others. Hurricane Georges had just recently reached Category 3-status when it made landfall on the island and became the worst storm to affect the island since Hurricane David made a direct landfall in 1979.

== Background and preparations ==
Hurricane Georges formed on September 15 from a tropical wave in the open Atlantic Ocean. It was named the next day by the National Hurricane Center (NHC), and Georges attained hurricane status by September 17. Moving westward, the hurricane intensified further, reaching peak winds of 250 mph (155 mph) on September 20. Increased wind shear caused Georges to weaken slightly. However, it was still a major hurricane when Georges moved across the northern Lesser Antilles and Puerto Rico on September 21. At 12:30 UTC on September 22, Georges made landfall in the Dominican Republic about 135 km (85 mi) east of the capital Santo Domingo, with winds of 195 km/h (120 mph). The hurricane subsequently weakened while moving across Hispaniola. Georges emerged from Haiti into the Windward Passage on September 23 as a minimal hurricane, and it later struck Cuba and the United States.

As Hurricane Georges proceeded westward, the National Hurricane Center issued a Hurricane Watch for the island late on September 20. The hurricane watch was upgraded to a hurricane warning soon after which persisted until September 23 when Georges passed. The civil defense, national emergency response team, the Red Cross, police, firefighters and the Health Ministry were dispatched for Hurricane Georges preparations. Air traffic was halted and ships were told to stay in their ports. Dominican Republic residents boarded up their windows and doors to protect against the oncoming hurricane. The National Hurricane Center had predicted that as the eye of the storm moved across the island there would be rains of 5-10 inches with more in certain areas. The storm surge was predicted to be 4–7 feet high and expected to batter the coastline. Isolated tornadoes were also predicted on September 22.

== Impact ==
Georges dumped major amounts of rainfall over the island, peaking at 53 centimeters in Polo. The National Hurricane Center did not get an official amount, but estimates recorded an amount around 39 inches (990 mm) on the island alone.

In the Dominican Republic, Georges brought very strong winds, heavy rains and a moderate storm surge. Nearly 10 hours of rainfall created mudslides and overflown rivers across the mountainous country, damaging many cities along the southern coast, including the capital, Santo Domingo. 120 mph (190 km/h) winds downed and uprooted trees across much of the country, littering streets with debris and mud. Thousands of houses were destroyed, while many were completely destroyed from the flooding and winds. The whole country was stripped of electricity during the aftermath of the storm, which damaged water and communication systems.

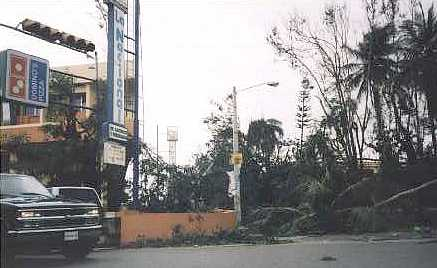
Toppled trees blocked hundreds of streets in Santo Domingo

After Georges passed over the Dominican Republic, 438 people were confirmed dead or missing with another 155,000 people to be homeless. Six women and children were killed when a youth hostel fell into the Ozama River, which was overswelling. 20 people were reported dead in the Azua Province in the Dominican Republic. Rescue workers were also searching for 30 children who went missing at a school in Cambita, which is 30 miles (48 km) from Santo Domingo. 500,000 people were left injured. 2000 people went missing in the town of Mesopotamia, which is surrounded by the Yaque del Sur and San Juan Rivers after the republic's officials opened the nearby dam without evacuating villagers beforehand. Water damage left many of the island's roads impassable, which left people isolated in villages without the correct necessities. 70%, or 112, of bridges in the Dominican Republic were destroyed. A Dominican economist, Felix Calvo estimated that the storm did about $6 billion (1998 USD) in damage to the island. The island's agriculture and tourism system suffered greatly. In the Dominican Republic, 55% of the agricultural system was lost, partly from mudslides, flash floods and river valleys. 90% of all of the plantations in the area were destroyed. Rice, bananas and cavassas, the most basic foods on the island, were hit hard. Large pastures for animals were destroyed as well as poultry and other necessities. The damage to farmland and agriculture would total out to about $434 million (1998 USD). Damage and repairs to houses and public buildings was to reach over $400 million. Damage to the electrical system on Dominican Republic totalled out to $107 million (1998 USD). Flooding and wind damage from Hurricane Georges caused major damage to the island's major airport in Santo Domingo.

== Aftermath ==
After Georges had passed by, the Dominican government declared that waterborne diseases, malaria, and dengue fever were major health concerns. The Dominican Republic Tourism Association found that less than the feared amount of tourism facilities were affected by Georges.

The BHR/OFDA assisted in helping out the Dominican Republic to repair after Georges. One Chargee d'Affaires declared the island as a disaster area. The organization sent $25,000 (1998 USD) to support purchasing of water purifying supplies, emergency construction materials and many chainsaws. They then sent three airplane flights to deliver body bags, plastic sheeting, five-gallon water jugs, water bladders and chainsaws. Two of the planes arrived on September 25, 1998, while the last one arrived the day after. The supplies sent by BHR/OFDA were controlled by the Dominican Red Cross. More plastic sheeting was sent on September 27 by a United States Military aircraft. The BHR/OFDA also supplied money for eight helicopters, six of which were blackhawks. The helicopters were used for two weeks and cost $1.2 million. On September 29, the organization contributed $300,000 at a request by PAHO. Part of that money was transferred to support a Peace Corps project to send 21,000 packages of pre-prepared foods for the island.

150,000 cubic meters of garbage was spread around the country's capital of Santo Domingo. The armed forces in the country went to clean up the mess, as well as an inter-institutional committee, which was formed just for the case. The BDR/OFDA obligated another $260,000 for a set of 100 500-gallon water tanks, 10 generators to power municipal water pumps, and many seeds to replant the country's agricultural system. The BDR/OFDA's assistance in the Dominican Republic ended on October 8, 1998, with control being taken over by the USG Corporation.

Most impacted by Hurricane Georges was the agricultural industry. The areas hardest hit by the hurricane coincided with the country's main crop-growing areas, including the provinces around Santo Domingo. After a severe drought in 1997, extreme rainfall damaged around 470,000 acres (1,900 km^{2}) of food crops. Substantial amounts of tobacco and sugar plantations were severely damaged. The extreme flooding caused great losses in the poultry industry, an important economy in the area. The island had to import significant amounts of rice and other crops to compensate for the losses from other countries.

The World Bank donated $111 million to a $125 million project which was to re-stabilize the Dominican Republic after Hurricane Georges. The World Bank had concluded that a lack of emergency management skills were used during Hurricane Georges. The population was not warned correctly of the impending storm, causing the preparations to be insufficient. The first component of the project was to quickly disperse $60 million for necessary items of recovery such as medicine, housing materials and chemical products. Another component was to fix the bridges and roads in the Dominican Republic, irrigation issues, electricity and hurricane preparedness.

== See also ==
- Effects of Hurricane Georges in the Lesser Antilles
