= Effects of Hurricane Georges in Louisiana =

Hurricane Georges
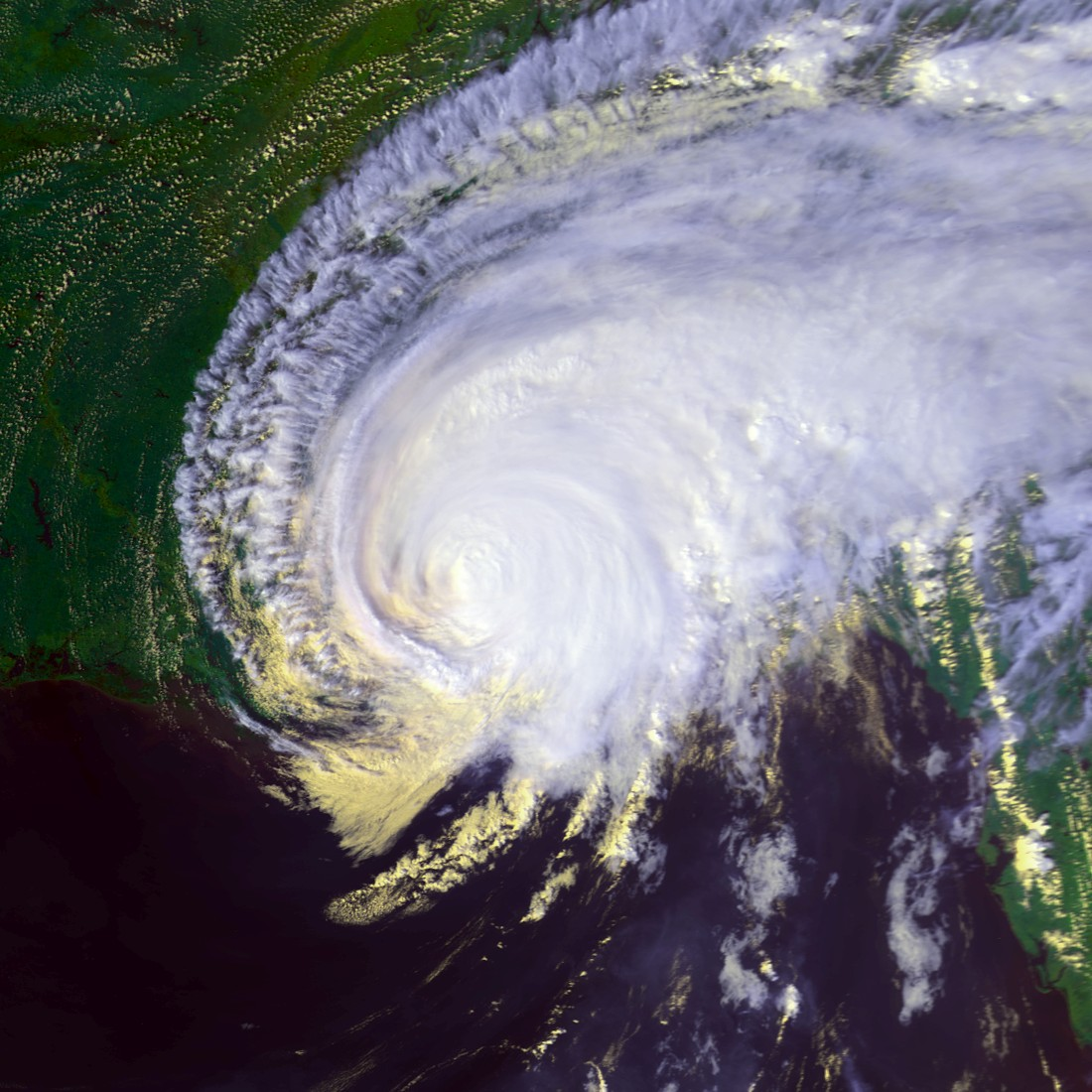
- Hurricane Georges making landfall in Mississippi

Tropical storm
- 1-minute sustained (SSHWS/NWS)
- Highest winds: 70 mph (110 km/h)
- Lowest pressure: 970 mbar (hPa); 28.64 inHg

Overall effects
- Fatalities: 3 indirect
- Damage: $30.1 million (1998 USD)
- Areas affected: Southeast Louisiana
- Part of the 1998 Atlantic hurricane season
- History: Meteorological history; Effects: Lesser Antilles; Puerto Rico; Dominican Republic; Haiti; Cuba; United States; Florida; Louisiana; Tornado outbreak; Other wikis: Commons: Georges images

The effects of Hurricane Georges in Louisiana included $30.1 million in damage and three deaths. Forming from a tropical wave over the Atlantic Ocean, Georges attained a peak intensity of 155 mph (249 km/h) on September 20, 1998. Over the following several days, the storm tracked through the Greater Antilles and later entered the Gulf of Mexico on September 28, the Category 2 storm made landfall in Mississippi before dissipating on October 1. Before landfall, about 500,000 residents in Louisiana evacuated from low-lying areas. The mayor of New Orleans declared a state of emergency to allow federal assistance into the state. After nearly 1.5 million people were urged to evacuate coastal areas, officials described the evacuation as "probably the largest [...] we have ever achieved".

Numerous homes located outside the levee system were flooded by the storm surge, and 85 fishing camps on the banks of Lake Pontchartrain were destroyed. An estimated 160,000 residences were left without power due to Georges and severe beach erosion took place due to the slow movement of the hurricane. Precipitation statewide peaked at 2.98 inches (76 mm) in Bogalusa, and wind gusts reached 82 mph (132 km/h). In the wake of the hurricane, the Federal Emergency Management Agency (FEMA) opened 67 shelters throughout the state, and covered insurance claims totalling $14,150,532, including from Puerto Rico and Mississippi. The Clinton administration appropriated $56 million in disaster relief to regions in Louisiana for recovery from Tropical Storm Frances and Hurricane Georges.

== Background and preparations ==
Hurricane Georges originated as a tropical depression on September 15 in the open Atlantic Ocean. A day later, the National Hurricane Center (NHC) named it Tropical Storm Georges, and upgraded it to a hurricane a day later. Georges moved across the northern Lesser Antilles and much of the Greater Antilles, maintaining hurricane intensity. It emerged into the Gulf of Mexico as a Category 2 hurricane on September 25 and turned to the northwest. By September 27, the NHC continued to forecast that Georges would strike southeastern Louisiana as a major hurricane, with some hurricane models predicting it would move ashore as far west as central Louisiana. Ultimately, Georges made landfall near Biloxi, Mississippi on September 28, with winds of 105 mph (169 km/h). Upon landfall, the hurricane's forward motion slowed to an eastward drift. Georges dissipated on October 1 near the Atlantic coast of Florida.

At 9:00 am Central Daylight Time (CDT) on September 25, the National Hurricane Center issued a hurricane watch for coastal regions of Louisiana east of Morgan City. The following day, the watch was upgraded to a hurricane warning when the storm neared landfall. A hurricane watch was also issued for areas between Morgan City and Intracoastal City. When forecasts indicated a landfall east of the state, the hurricane watch was canceled and the hurricane warning amended to a tropical storm warning. By September 29, all tropical cyclone warnings and watches were discontinued.

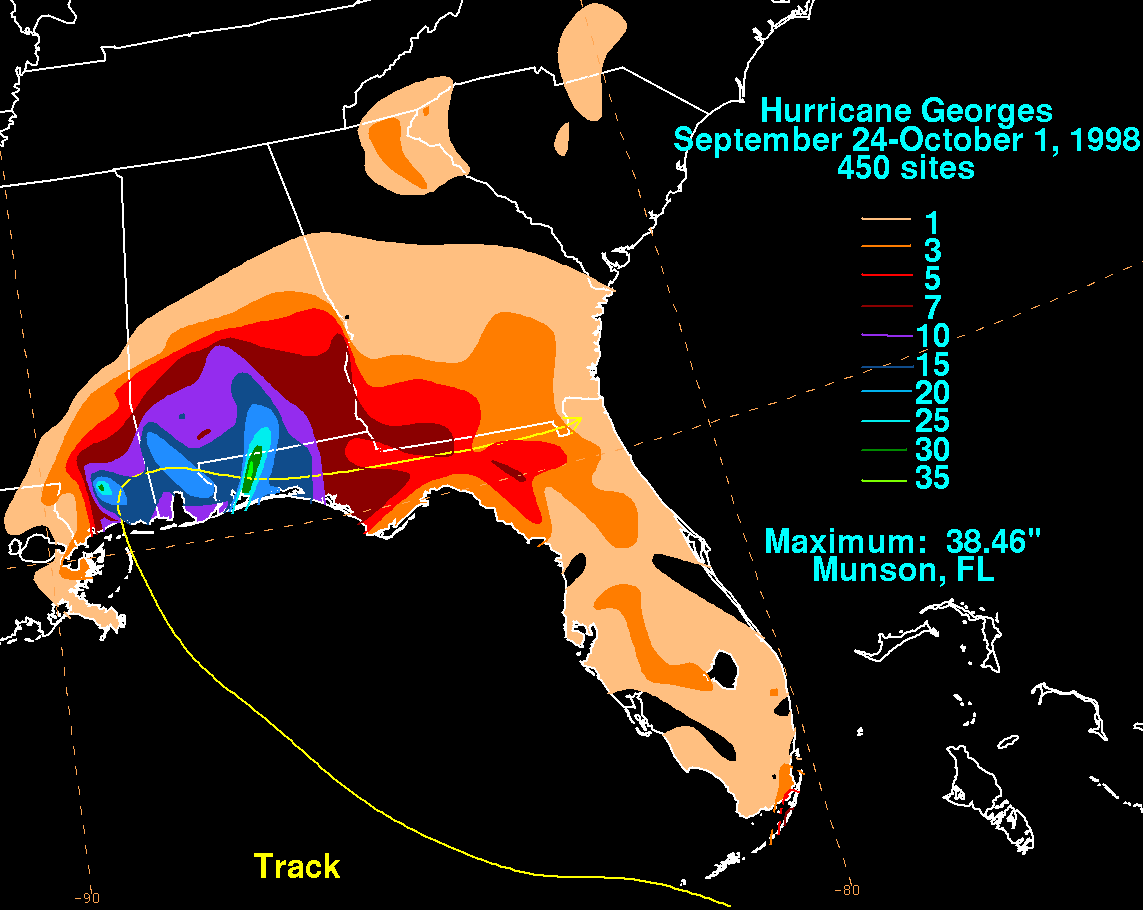
Total rainfall in the United States from Georges

During September 25–26, large-scale evacuations took place in response to forecasts suggesting a landfall near New Orleans. More than 1.5 million people in New Orleans were advised to leave the city. The nine shelters opened throughout the area were collectively capable of accommodating up to 450,000 people. New Orleans mayor Marc Morial declared a State of Emergency to allow federal assistance into the affected areas during the immediate aftermath of the hurricane. A curfew was instituted for those who ignored evacuation orders or could not leave the city.

Approximately 500,000 people evacuated from Jefferson and Orleans Parishes in advance of the hurricane. Elsewhere, about 31,000 others took refuge in shelters set up throughout the state. In Jefferson Parish, roughly 3,900 people evacuated to public shelters, while 20,000 temporarily moved to Orleans Parish, 14,000 of whom were located in the Louisiana Superdome. In Plaquemines Parish, about 15,000 residents evacuated and 2,300 took refuge in public shelters. Grand Isle's 1,500 residents were ordered to evacuate for the fourth time in a month. Due to the large-scale evacuations, 175 off-duty state troopers and 250 national guard troops were deployed to help speed up the process. Only two highways, U.S. Route 90 and Interstate 10 lead in and out of New Orleans; heavy rains from previous storms flooded parts of US 90, hindering preparation efforts. Lt. Col. Ronnie Jones of the Louisiana state police noted that the evacuation was "probably the largest [...] we have ever achieved".

== Impact ==
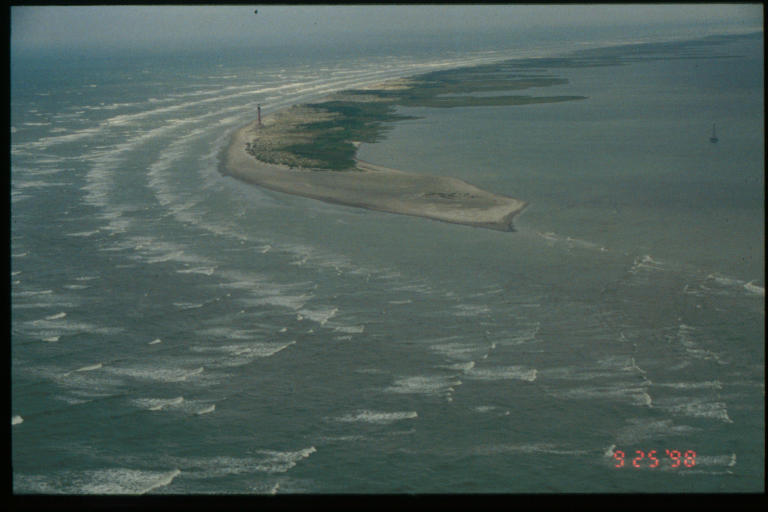

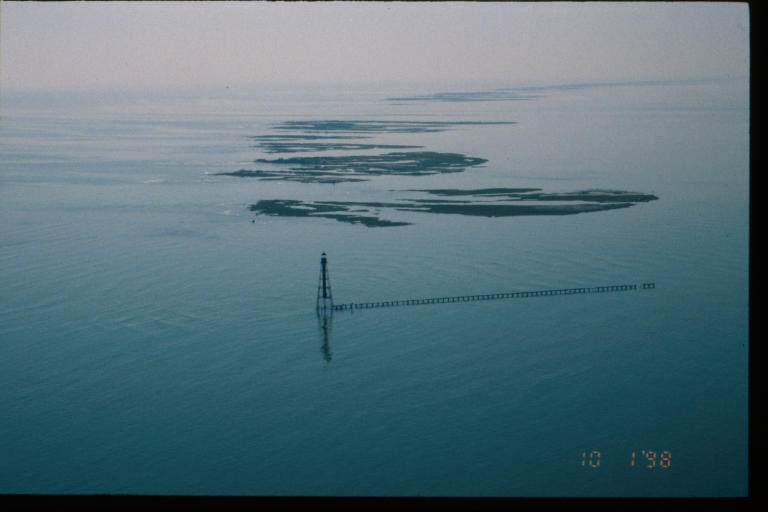
Chandeleur Islands before (top) and after (bottom) Hurricane Georges

Compared to the record-breaking rainfall in Mississippi, Alabama, and Florida, Hurricane Georges produced relatively little precipitation in Louisiana, peaking at 2.98 inches (76 mm) in Bogalusa. The worst damages were confined to the southeastern portion of the state, concentrated in the Plaquemines and St. Bernard Parishes. A storm surge of 8.9 ft (2.7 m) was recorded in Gardene Bay before power at the recording station failed. Gale-force winds impacted most of the parish and gusts peaked at 82 mph (132 km/h). The combination of high winds and surge cut power to most of the area and flooded at least 50 homes, all of which were located outside the levee system. A lighthouse on one island was partially submerged in the Gulf of Mexico, nearly 1,200 feet (370 m) from land following severe beach erosion. Six-foot (1.8 m) sand dunes on the islands were completely eroded by the storm, leaving boardwalks formerly situated atop the dunes suspended near the water's surface.

In St. Tammany Parish, the storm's effects were mainly limited to wind damage: gusts reached 48 mph (77 km/h), knocking down trees and power lines. A storm surge of 4.3 ft (1.3 m) flooded 20 homes in the parish. Winds in Jefferson Parish gusted up to 55 mph (89 km/h), causing minor roof damage and power outages. In Orleans Parish, a storm surge of 5.81 ft (1.77 m) destroyed 85 fishing camps constructed on wooden pilings. Winds gusting up to 68 mph (109 km/h) left 80,000 residences without power in the parish. Throughout the state, a total of 160,000 homes and businesses lost power due to the hurricane. Georges is blamed for three indirect fatalities; two men collapsed and died due to medical conditions aggravated by the stress of the evacuation, and another died as the result of a house fire sparked by an emergency candle that was tipped over. Damages from the storm totaled approximately $30.1 million.

== Aftermath ==
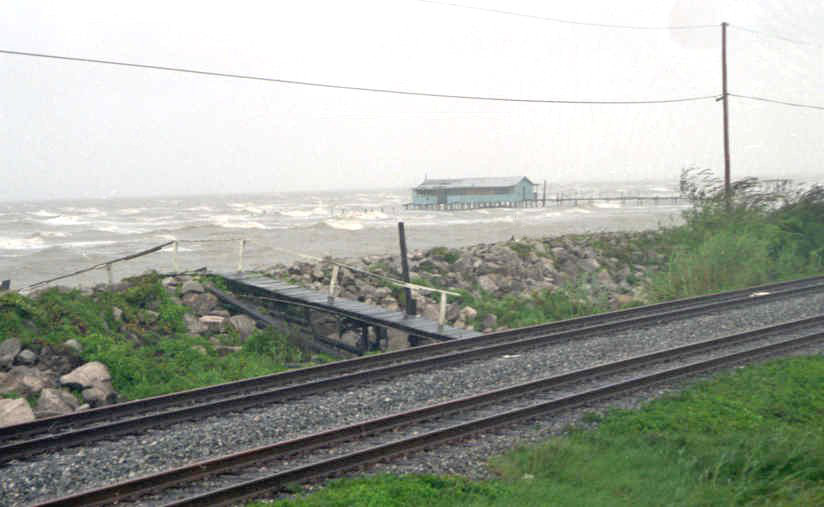
Lake Pontchartrain during Hurricane Georges

Before Hurricane Georges, FEMA issued disaster declarations for Ascension, Assumption, Jefferson, Lafourche, Livingston, Plaquemines, Orleans, St. Bernard, St. Charles, St. James, St. John the Baptist, St. Tammany, Terrebone, Tangipahoa, and Washington Parishes. The declaration allowed residents to receive individual and public assistance. Including relief funds to Puerto Rico and Mississippi associated with Georges, a total of $14,150,532 insurance claims was paid for by FEMA. The Clinton administration appropriated $56 million in post-disaster funds for regions impacted Tropical Storm Frances and Hurricane Georges in Louisiana.

Throughout the state, officials opened 67 shelters and deployed 1,200 FEMA personnel to Louisiana, Mississippi, Alabama, Florida and Georgia. The day after Georges made landfall, 4,000 of the 14,000 residents who evacuated to the Louisiana Superdome returned to their homes; however, Mayor Marc Morial requested that the residents stay in the Superdome for their own safety. In attempts to prevent major flooding in the aftermath of Georges, the United States National Guard provided the Gulf Coast with 1.25 million sandbags. Rescue teams flew nearly 50 missions in response to calls for help from stranded residents. The United Methodist Committee on Relief deployed its disaster response team on September 29 to the state to assess damages wrought by Georges. Thomas Michot, a United States Geological Survey ecologist, surveyed the islands following the storm and stated that "the single most important line of defense standing between New Orleans and future hurricanes had all but disappeared".

== See also ==
- 1998 Atlantic hurricane season
- Effects of Hurricane Georges in Florida
- History of New Orleans
