= Effects of Hurricane Georges in Cuba =

Hurricane Georges
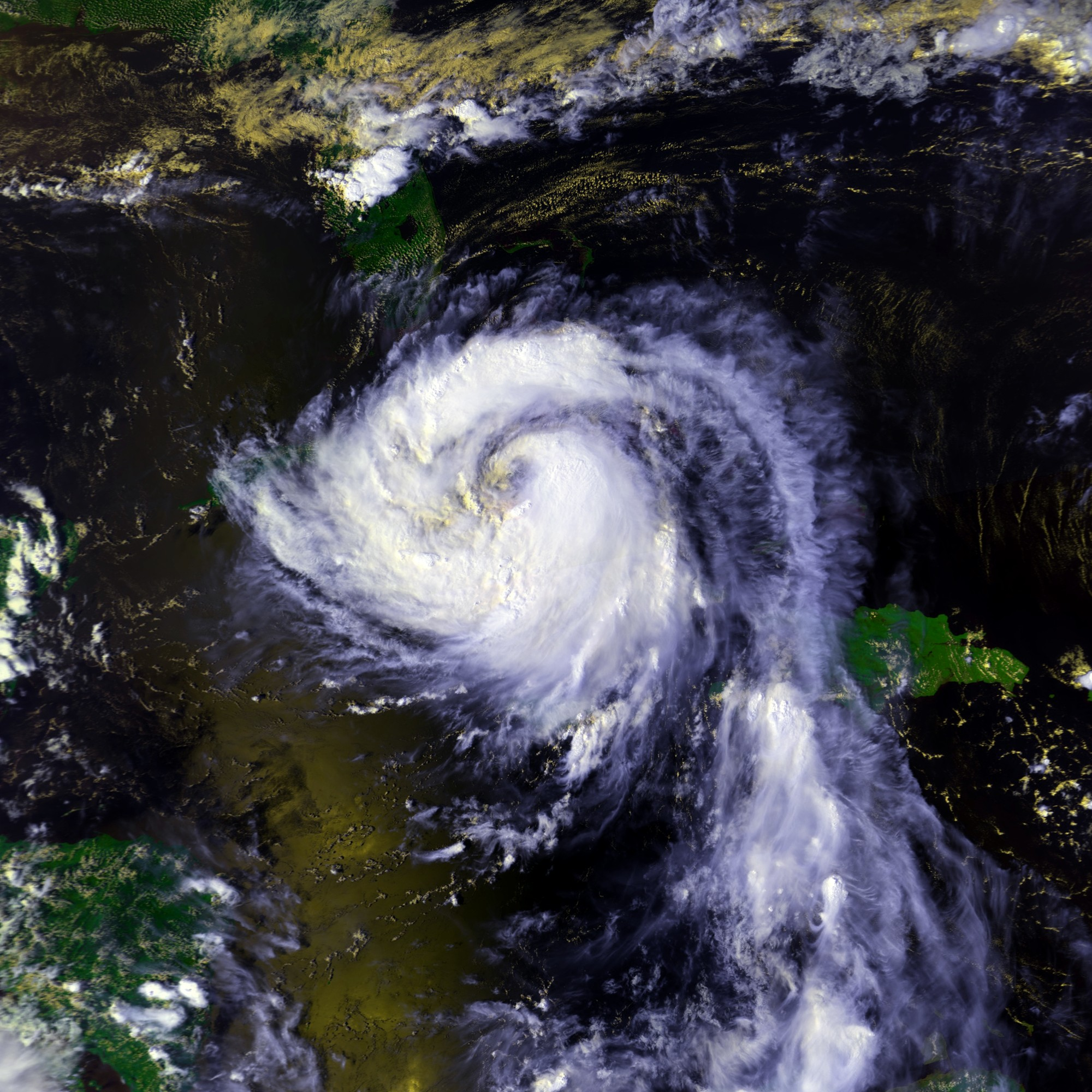
- Hurricane Georges just offshore northern Cuba on September 24

Category 1 hurricane
- 1-minute sustained (SSHWS/NWS)
- Highest winds: 75 mph (120 km/h)
- Lowest pressure: 993 mbar (hPa); 29.32 inHg

Overall effects
- Fatalities: 6 total
- Damage: $306 million (1998 USD)
- Areas affected: Cuba
- Part of the 1998 Atlantic hurricane season
- History: Meteorological history; Effects: Lesser Antilles; Puerto Rico; Dominican Republic; Haiti; Cuba; United States; Florida; Louisiana; Tornado outbreak; Other wikis: Commons: Georges images

The effects of Hurricane Georges in Cuba included $305.8 million in damages and six deaths. Forming out of a tropical wave over the Atlantic Ocean, Georges attained a peak intensity of 249 km/h (155 mph) on September 20, 1998. On September 23, the storm made landfall in southeastern Cuba as a minimal Category 1 hurricane. The storm tracked over the county for the following two days before emerging into the Gulf of Mexico on September 25 and later making landfall in the United States as a Category 2 hurricane. Before the storm's landfall in Cuba, officials reported that 200,000 people were evacuated to shelters; however, later reports indicated that upwards 711,000 people evacuated. A state of emergency was declared for much of eastern Cuba and most of the country was placed under a tropical storm or hurricane warning during the storm's passage.

More than 3,000 homes were destroyed and 60,000 damaged throughout the country, leaving an estimated 100,000 people homeless. Agricultural losses were severe, with the plantain crop loss estimated at 70% of annual production due to Georges, accounting for roughly $15 million of the total damages. Following the passage of the hurricane, several countries provided relief funds to Cuba for disaster recovery. Despite crop losses, affected residents were given essential supplies by the local government. By December, an estimated $90 million in funds was allocated for the impacts of Georges and the drought that preceded it.

== Background and preparations ==
Hurricane Georges formed on September 15 from a tropical wave in the open Atlantic Ocean. It was named the next day by the National Hurricane Center (NHC), and Georges attained hurricane status by September 17. Moving westward, the hurricane intensified further, reaching peak winds of 250 mph (155 mph) on September 20. Increased wind shear caused Georges to weaken slightly. However, it was still a major hurricane when Georges moved across the northern Lesser Antilles and Puerto Rico on September 21. Further weakening occurred while the hurricane crossed Hispaniola. Late on September 23, Georges made landfall in southeastern Cuba near Guantanamo Bay, retaining hurricane status while moving through the northern portion of the country. On September 24, the hurricane emerged into the Straits of Florida, and Georges eventually dissipated over the southeastern United States.

At 1900 UTC on September 21, the National Hurricane Center issued a hurricane watch for eastern Cuba for areas between the provinces of Las Tunas and Guantánamo. The following day, the watch was extended northward to Sancti Spíritus Province. Areas south of Las Tunas were also placed under a hurricane warning at this time. By 0900 UTC on September 23, all areas previously under a hurricane watch were under hurricane warnings. The watch was further extended to Cienfuegos Province as Georges tracked through southern Cuba. Areas south of Sancti Spíritus Province were also placed under a hurricane warning. By September 25, all hurricane warnings were discontinued in the country and all watches were discontinued the following day.

On September 22, much of eastern Cuba was placed under storm alert by President Fidel Castro. Authorities worked quickly to clean storm drains, trim trees, and move residents to safety, including 30,000 children in the mountains who were picking coffee. On September 23, authorities in Cuba evacuated 200,000 residents from coastal areas as Georges neared landfall. The Cuban Red Cross reported that nearly 500,000 people were evacuated, of which 200,000 were placed in shelters. Later reports stated that about 711,000 people were evacuated from dangerous areas. Flights in and out of the county were cancelled and schools were closed due to the storm. In addition to the evacuation of residents, more than 90,000 head of cattle were relocated to higher ground.

In Guantánamo Province, 240 refugees from Haiti and 3,000 residents from the town of Maisí were evacuated. An additional 2,500 people were evacuated from Baracoa. In all, 50,000 people were evacuated from the region. An estimated 140,000 people were evacuated from Holguín Province as well as 8,000 heads of cattle. In Santiago de Cuba Province, 12,400 people were evacuated and relief crews were being staged at several shelters set up throughout the province. Another 1,000 residents were evacuated from Ciego de Ávila Province and 17,000 students were relocated from Sancti Spíritus Province. Construction crews worked quickly to secure dilapidated homes in Baracoa and evacuated tourists from the region. Tourists were sheltered in numerous hotels and hospitals and were warned for unknown reasons not to take pictures of the damage once the storm had passed.

Much of eastern Cuba, already under storm alert, was placed under a State of Emergency due to the threat of Georges. President Castro emphasized the severity of the hurricane during a two-hour address to the nation on September 23. He explained, in great detail, civil preparation maps and impacts from past hurricanes. His last note was that he would refuse any aid from the United States as they (Cuba) would not accept aid from a country that has an embargo on them.

== Impact ==
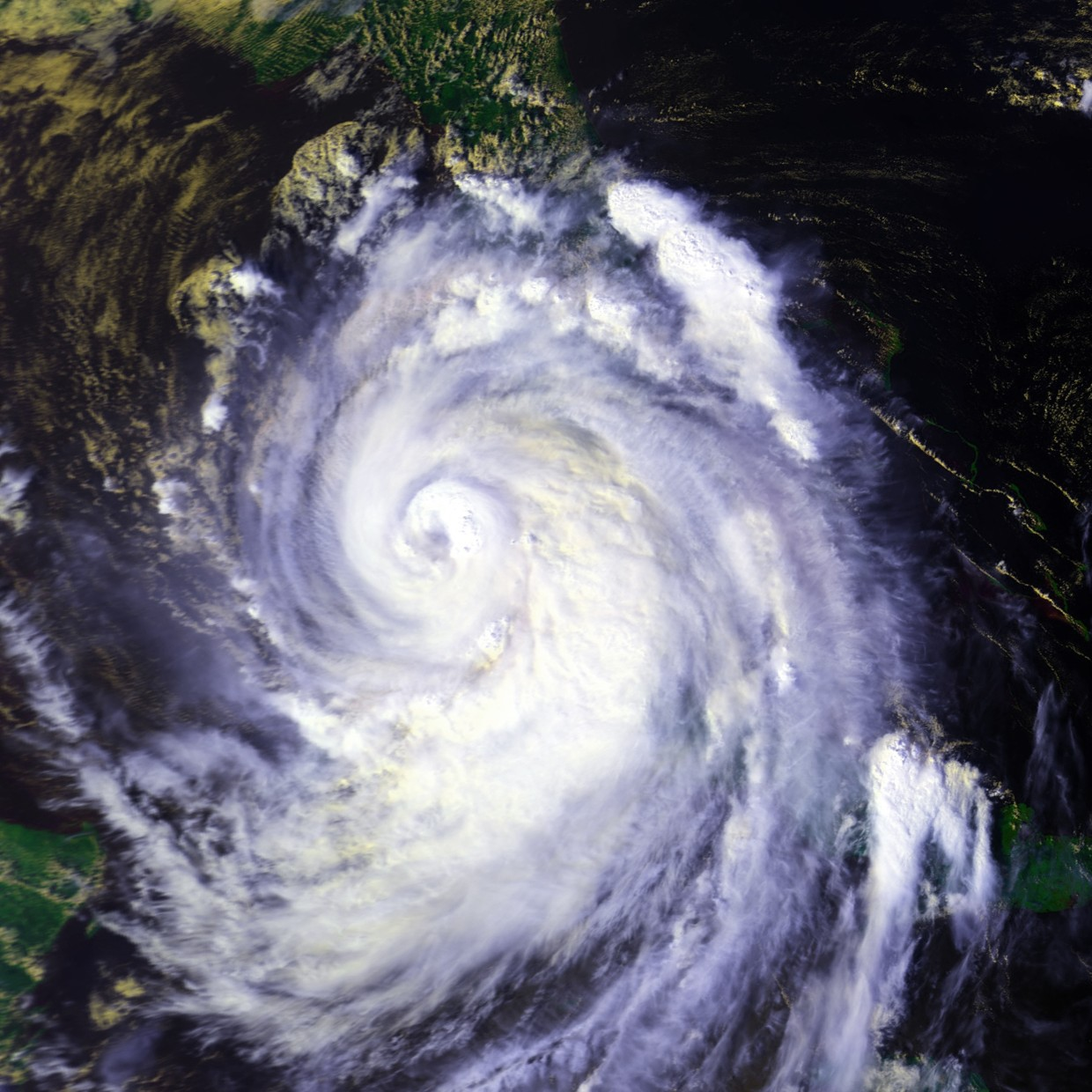
Hurricane Georges near the Florida Keys on September 25

Total rains from Georges
Location	Rainfall
Limonar	620 millimetres (24.4 in)
Bermeja	520 millimetres (20.3 in)
Gran Piedra	480 millimetres (18.9 in)
Puriales de Caujerí	440 millimetres (17.5 in)
Venezuela	340 millimetres (13.5 in)
Vertientes	320 millimetres (12.6 in)
Nueva Paz	310 millimetres (12.4 in)
Yabú	310 millimetres (12.2 in)

Throughout Cuba, Hurricane Georges produced torrential rainfall, peaking at 620 millimetres (24.41 in) in Limonar in the province of Guantánamo. Several other locations reported over a foot (300 mm) of precipitation as well. Storm surge of 1.2–1.8 metres (4–6 ft) was expected along the eastern coastline, along with dangerous waves on top of the surge. Though winds were reduced by the time Georges hit Cuba, it still retained winds of 121 km/h (75 mph), along with stronger gusts in squalls. Waves exceeding 4.9 m (16 ft) impacted coastal regions of the county, with some areas reporting that waves were topping the sea wall.

The first community to lose power was in Maisí located within Guantánamo Province. Heavy rains from the outer bands of Hurricane Georges triggered flooding in the region as more than 250 millimetres (10 in) of rain fell by September 24. Sustained winds in the hurricane reached 121 km/h (75 mph) with higher gusts as the storm tracked over eastern Cuba. By 9 pm on September 24, the eye of Georges passed over Baracoa. In Guantánamo, four rivers overflowed their banks and flooded the provincial capital; however, power lines were downed throughout the region and contact to officials in the area was impossible.

The hurricane's heavy rainfall resulted in mudslides along the mountainous terrain. This, combined with strong winds, damaged 60,475 homes, of which 3,481 were completely destroyed. Along with other affected nations in the Caribbean, more than 100,000 were left homeless due to Hurricane Georges. A total of 1,117 businesses were also damaged, of which 12 were destroyed. High winds downed power lines, trees, and telephone poles, leaving many in eastern Cuba without electricity in the aftermath of the storm. Along the coast, severe flooding washed out railroad and highway bridges. Though eastern Cuba was the area most affected, the central and western portion of the island, including Havana, experienced torrential rains and strong wind gusts. There, strong waves broke over the seawall, and caused heavy flood damage to some of the town's old buildings.

As in Puerto Rico and Hispaniola, the severe drought during the El Niño of 1997 exacerbated the flood's disruption to crops in eastern Cuba. The heavy rainfall from Georges damaged the crops greatly, despite the effort to harvest them prior to its arrival. Up to 70% of the plantain crop, a chief food in the country's diet, was destroyed. The sugarcane crop fared badly as well, limiting one of the country's important export crops. The coffee and cocoa plantations also suffered from the hurricane, further damaging the country's food supply. A total of 15,758 hectares of croplands as well as 36,040 tons of fruit were destroyed by Hurricane Georges. Agricultural losses from the storm were estimated at $15 million.

Well-executed evacuations and warnings limited the death toll to six, while damage amounted to $305.8 million (1998 USD, $409.8 million 2009 USD). In addition to the six human lives lost, 497 heads of cattle and 21,387 chickens were killed. All six human deaths were indirectly related to Georges; the first death occurred when a 61-year-old woman stepped on a downed wire and was electrocuted; the second occurred when a 56-year-old man drove over another downed wire on his motorcycle and was electrocuted.

== Aftermath ==
On September 25, the government of Spain approved $1.07 million in food assistance for Cuba. On September 29, the government of Japan sent water equipment, soap, towels, and emergency health kits worth $119,200 to the affected areas in Cuba. By February 1999, the Japanese Government had provided Cuba with nearly $1 million in disaster funds. An emergency cash grant of $50,000 was also given to Cuba by the United Nations. The Cuban Red Cross mobilized about 8,700 volunteers to assist victims of the storm in the 900 shelters set up throughout the island. Plastic sheeting was to be distributed for about a week for residents to patch holes in the roof of their homes. The National Council of Churches sent relief goods valued at $70,000 to the Cuban Government on October 9. By February 1999, the Cuban Red Cross distributed over 30,000 sheets of roofing to nearly 5,500 people in three provinces. Several months after the storm, the Cuban Government reported that they had allocated about $38 million in funds for Hurricane Georges.

Already suffering from food shortages due to a five-month drought, President Fidel Castro announced that the government would supply people under the age of 14 and those over 60, which accounts for roughly 36% of Cuba's population, with extra food aid. An estimated 156,000 tonnes of food was set aside for this action and the food was worth several million dollars. People who qualified for the aid would receive 2.0 kilograms (4.4 lb) of rice and peas if they lived in western Cuba and 3.0 kilograms (6.6 lb) if they lived in eastern Cuba per month until July 1999. The United Nations World Food Programme provided $20.5 million in aid for both the effects of the drought and Georges. By December, the Cuban Government requested $90 million to help recover from the hurricane and drought. By this time, about $40 million had already been set aside for the same reason. The Cuban Red Cross supplied shelter for more than 92,000 residents and supplied them with hygiene kits, food, water, and other relief materials.

On December 18, 1998, the United Nations launched a large-scale rehabilitation effort in Cuba. Roughly $14 million was spent on housing and infrastructure reconstruction and repair; this portion of the project consisted of reconstruction of homes, schools, businesses, hospitals, irrigation and the water system. Another $1.1 million was used to inform and protect residents against post-storm diseases. The largest part of the effort involved jump-starting agriculture and fisheries. Roughly $50.4 million was provided to reconstruct fishing vessels, purchase new tools and gear. By mid-February 1999, the Governments of Italy, Germany, Canada and the European Union provided $1 million, $714,000, $50,000, and $510,200 in funds respectively. The Government of Israel also supplied agricultural tools. The Government of Norway provided $29,100 in water-borne disease prevention funds. Through various agencies, the United Nations Office for the Coordination of Humanitarian Affairs provided Cuba with roughly $86 million in disaster funding.

== See also ==
- Hurricane Georges
- 1998 Atlantic hurricane season
