= Effects of Hurricane Georges in Puerto Rico =

Hurricane Georges
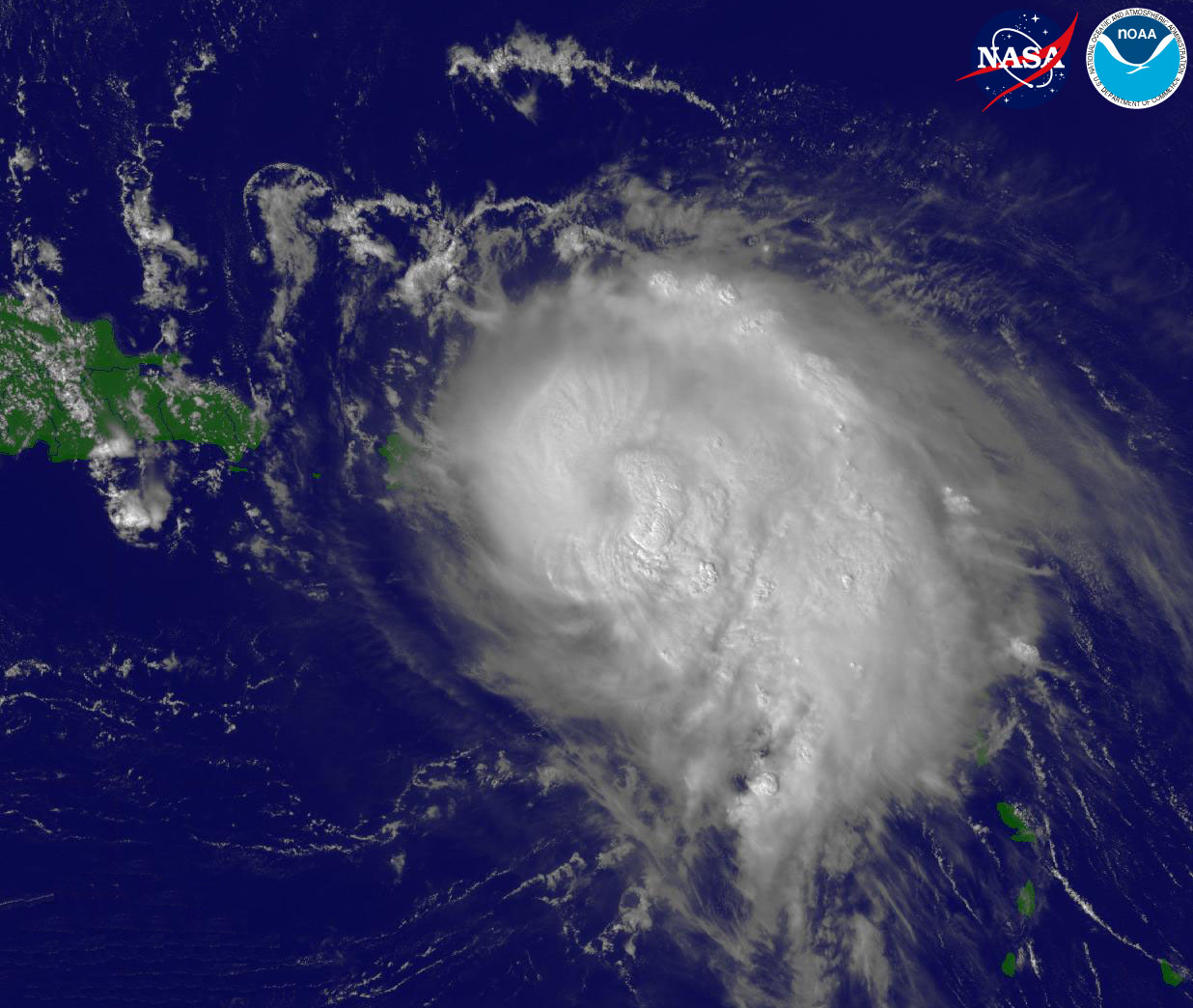
- Hurricane Georges approaching Puerto Rico

Category 3 major hurricane
- 1-minute sustained (SSHWS/NWS)
- Highest winds: 115 mph (185 km/h)
- Lowest pressure: 968 mbar (hPa); 28.59 inHg

Overall effects
- Fatalities: 8 indirect
- Damage: $3 billion (1998 USD)
- Part of the 1998 Atlantic hurricane season
- History: Meteorological history; Effects: Lesser Antilles; Puerto Rico; Dominican Republic; Haiti; Cuba; United States; Florida; Louisiana; Tornado outbreak; Other wikis: Commons: Georges images

The effects of Hurricane Georges in Puerto Rico included $2 billion in damages and five fatalities. Hurricane Georges was the first hurricane to cross the entire island since the San Ciprian Hurricane in 1932. Georges formed on September 15, 1998 as Tropical Depression Seven off the African coast. Georges strengthened into a Category 4-hurricane on September 19 as it made landfall in the Lesser Antilles. Georges made landfall on the island on September 21 as a Category 3-hurricane. Georges caused $3 billion (1998 USD, $4.5 billion 2017 USD) in damage to the island.

== Background and preparations ==
Hurricane Georges formed on September 15 from a tropical wave in the open Atlantic Ocean. It was named the next day by the National Hurricane Center (NHC), and Georges attained hurricane status by September 17. Moving westward, the hurricane intensified further, reaching peak winds of 250 mph (155 mph) on September 20. Increased wind shear caused Georges to weaken slightly. However, it was still a major hurricane when Georges moved across the northern Lesser Antilles on September 21. At 22:00 UTC that day, Georges made landfall in northeastern Puerto Rico near Fajardo. The hurricane continued westward across the Greater Antilles, later striking the Dominican Republic, Cuba, Florida, and Mississippi.

On September 19, a hurricane watch was issued for Puerto Rico. A day later on September 20, the watch was upgraded to a hurricane warning for the entire island. The warning was discontinued on September 22 at 1500 UTC. More than 1,600 people sought shelter in public buildings on Puerto Rico and the nearby United States Virgin Islands. 29,107 people sheltered in 401 shelters on the island. Both areas declared a state of emergency and activated the United States National Guard for help. Puerto Rico's governor, Pedro Rosselló banned all liquor sales and ordered the Puerto Rico Police to open all the shelters throughout the island.

== Impact ==
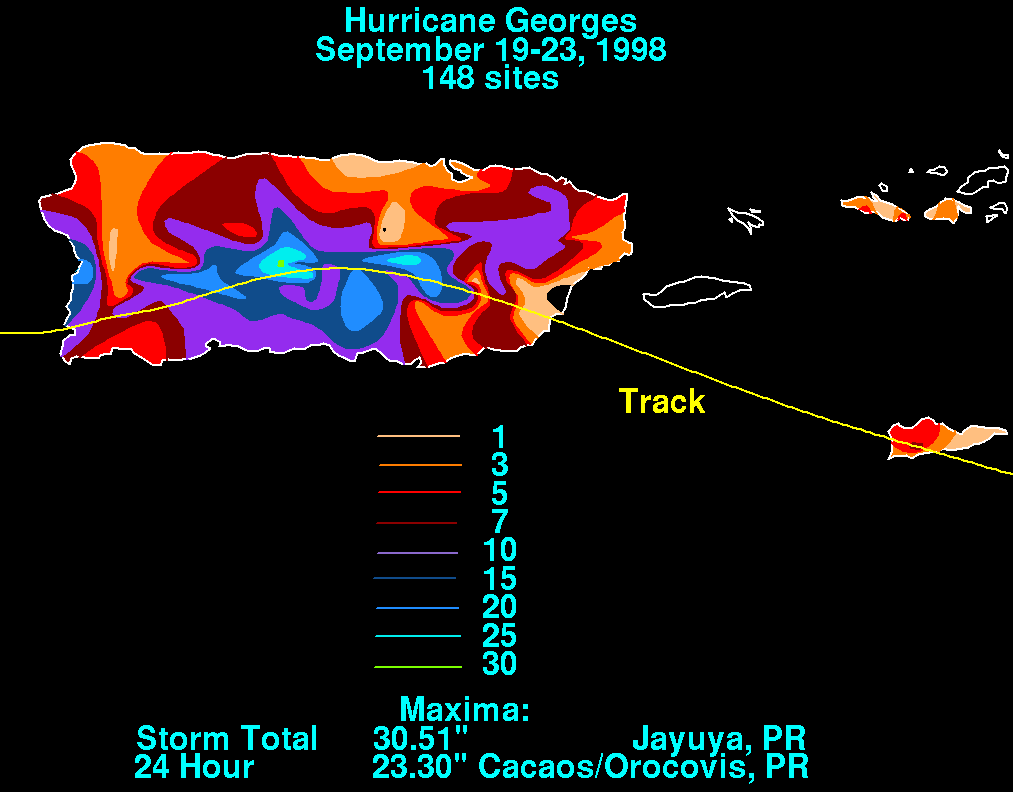
Total rainfall in Puerto Rico from Georges

Upon making landfall in Puerto Rico, Hurricane Georges brought 20-foot waves in succession. A storm surge of up to 10 ft (3.0 m) was estimated at Fajardo. Flooding was severe and extensive across the island, especially in the interior mountainous areas. Rainfall of up to 30.51 in (775 mm) of rain was measured. At the height of the storm, all the rivers overflowed to some degree, with some setting new discharge records. Those rivers carved out new channels, eroded new parts of the flood plains and leaving many areas submerged. Three tornadoes were detected by Doppler weather radar in Puerto Rico; one north of Puenta Este in Vieques, another in the Orocovis and Barranquitas general area, and another in the Jayuya area.

There was massive damage to Puerto Rico's utility system. 96% of the 1.3 million customers lost electricity. 8.4% of customers lost telephone service. Water and sewer service was lost to 75% of the island's population. At least an estimated 50% of electrical poles and cables were damaged. Numerous road signs were twisted and destroyed, while electric posts, cables, and trees were knocked down. Many places experienced severe erosion, with communities in western Puerto Rico being cut off after roads were washed out to sea. Many roads became impassable due to floods or destruction. Several bridges collapsed in the interior, southeastern, and northern areas. Road damage totaled US$21,995,975.

The agricultural sector of Puerto Rico lost over 75% of its coffee crops, 95% of its plantain and banana crops, and 65% of its poultry. Equipment, agriculture, and manufacturing losses amounted to $212.9 million a day. 72,605 houses were damaged and an estimated 28,005 houses were destroyed. On the nearby island of Culebra, 74 houses were destroyed and 89 suffered partial damage. Public schools suffered an estimated $20–25 million in damage. The Puente Victor Rojas in Arecibo collapsed during Hurricane Georges. The total damage to the Puerto Rican economy was estimated at $1.907 billion.

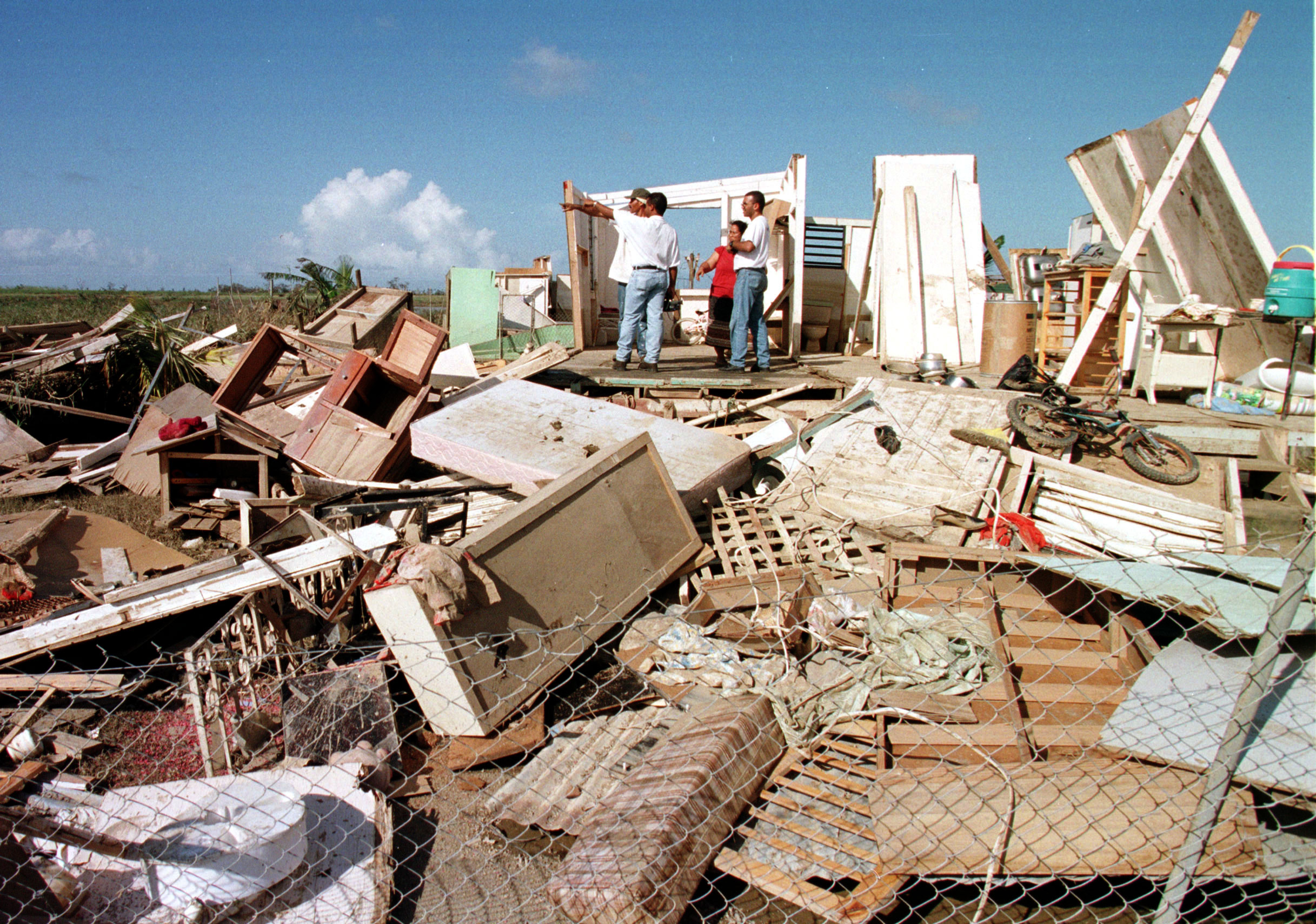
A home destroyed by Georges in Toa Baja

Georges indirectly caused eight deaths in Puerto Rico. A 28-year-old woman died from carbon monoxide poisoning after operating a gasoline-powered generator inside her home. Two others were hospitalized for the same issue. A Bayamón man was found dead from carbon monoxide poisoning after fumes entered his store. A mother and her three children were killed as a lit candle set their house on fire. The other two cases were due to accidents while repairing storm damage. Total damages from the storm amounted to roughly $3 billion.

== Aftermath ==
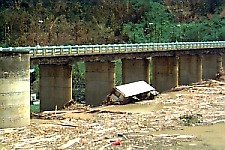
Severe flooding caused by the storm

The Church World Service donated 1,000 bed sheets, 200 light-weight blankets, 1,000 cotton blankets, 2,000 health/first aid kits, 500 kerosene lanterns, 6,000 vials of water purification tablets, 1,000 school kits, 350 layettes, 500 flashlights, 500 sets of batteries, and 1,000 air mattresses to the Puerto Rico Council of Churches and other organizations. Total value of the items reached over $100,000 (1998 USD). The Federal Emergency Management Agency donated a 50-generator power pack for the island on September 23. The United States Army Corps of Engineers purchased 1 million pounds of ice and gallons of water for distribution. The Army Corps also provided teams of emergency debris clearance and removal. New York Yankees manager George Steinbrenner donated $200,000 from the Yankee Foundation to the hardest-hit areas of Puerto Rico and the nearby Dominican Republic.

Federal and Commonwealth officials created a 5-year, $1.2 billion plan to build and replace homes destroyed by Georges. The money for this rebuilding process was to be funded by state and local governments and houses were not to be built in landslide-prone areas. FEMA also ordered that they be built stronger as Georges devastated houses made out of wood or corrugated metal. FEMA received more than 190,000 requests for aid and had given more than $65 million in aid checks.

Hurricane Georges caused catastrophic damage to the road system in Puerto Rico. The hurricane had affected over 7000 kilometers of roads and 2100 bridges throughout the island. Most of these effects were structural failure, signs, signal systems, and landslides. The Puerto Rico Department of Transportation and Public Works started an emergency response to clean up the roads. Over 230 teams cleaned up debris and installed four temporary bridges.

== See also ==
- Effects of Hurricane Georges in the Dominican Republic
- Effects of Hurricane Georges in the Lesser Antilles
