= Effects of Hurricane Georges in Florida =

Hurricane Georges
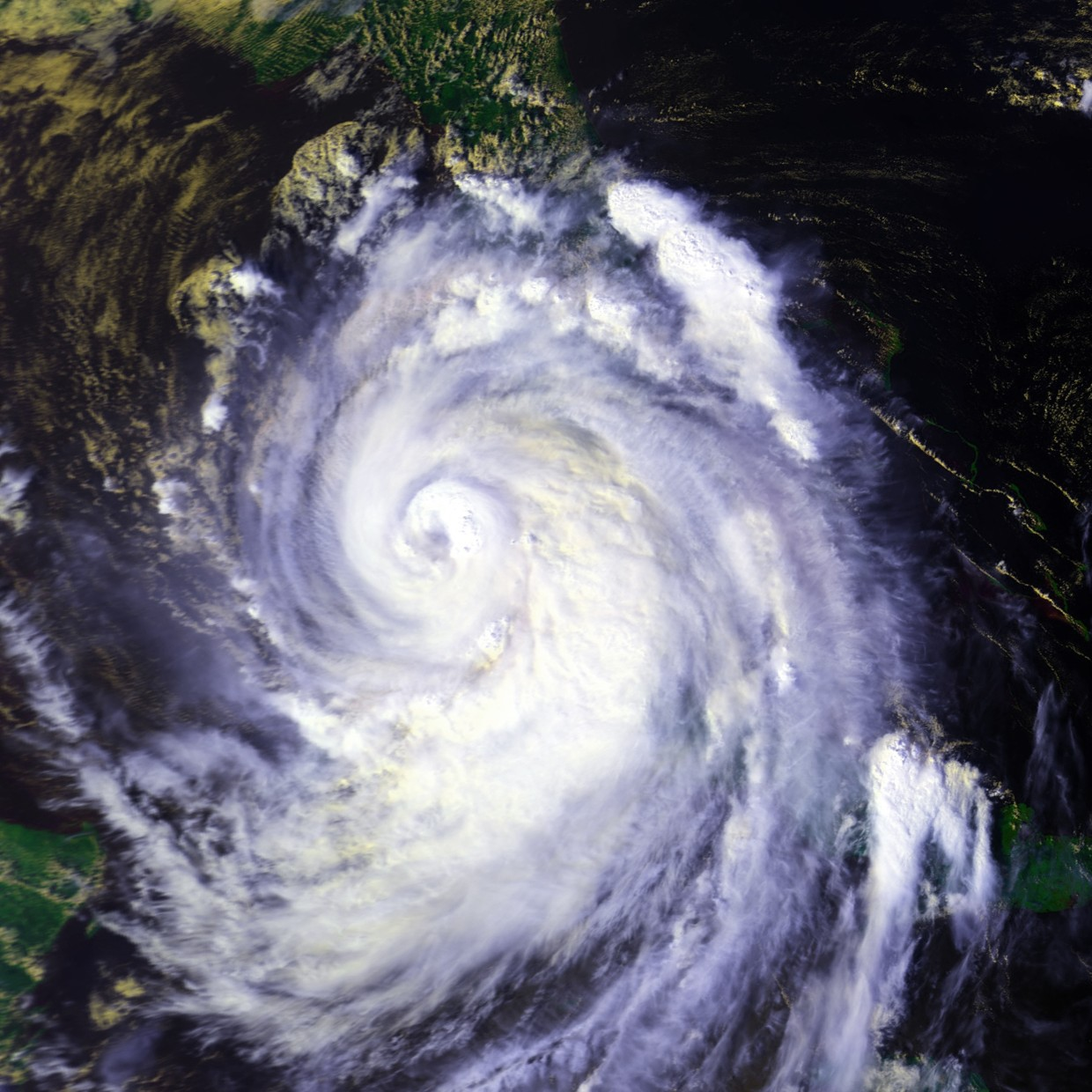
- Hurricane Georges near the Florida Keys on September 25

Meteorological history
- Formed: September 24, 1998
- Dissipated: October 1, 1998

Category 2 hurricane
- 1-minute sustained (SSHWS/NWS)
- Highest winds: 105 mph (165 km/h)
- Lowest pressure: 964 mbar (hPa); 28.47 inHg

Overall effects
- Fatalities: 5 total
- Damage: $340 million (1998 USD)
- Areas affected: Florida Keys, South Florida, Florida Panhandle
- Part of the 1998 Atlantic hurricane season
- History: Meteorological history; Effects: Lesser Antilles; Puerto Rico; Dominican Republic; Haiti; Cuba; United States; Florida; Louisiana; Tornado outbreak; Other wikis: Commons: Georges images

The effects of Hurricane Georges in Florida lasted for more than a week in late September and early October in 1998. After developing from a tropical wave to the south of Cape Verde on September 15, Georges moved steadily west-northwestward and peaked as a strong Category 4 hurricane on the Saffir–Simpson scale on September 20. After weakening slightly to a Category 3, the cyclone proceeded to strike Antigua, Saint Kitts and Nevis, Puerto Rico, Dominican Republic, and Cuba. Georges emerged into the Straits of Florida as a Category 1, but re-strengthened slightly to a Category 2 before making landfall in Key West, Florida, on September 25. The hurricane continued northwestward into the Gulf of Mexico and struck near Biloxi, Mississippi, on September 28. After moving inland, Georges turned eastward and crossing into the Florida Panhandle on the next day. By October 1, the system dissipated near the northeast Florida–southeast Georgia coast.

With a landfall predicted along the mainland of Florida, the National Hurricane Center (NHC) issued tropical cyclone warnings and watches, while more than 1.2 million people were ordered to evacuate. Strong winds left all of the Florida Keys without electricity. Georges damaged 1,536 houses and destroyed 173 homes throughout the island chain, many of which were mobile homes. The Florida Keys reported about $200 million in damage. While approaching landfall in Mississippi, Georges generated storm surge and abnormally high tides along the coast of the Florida Panhandle, causing erosion and coastal flooding near the west end of the state. After crossing into the panhandle, Georges dropped heavy rainfall, peaking at 38.46 in (977 mm) in Munson, flooding hundreds of homes in the region. The cyclone also spawned 17 tornadoes in the state, the most since Agnes in 1972. Georges caused five deaths and at least $340 million in damage in Florida.

After the storm, the name Georges was retired and removed from the Atlantic hurricane naming list. A disaster declaration allowed residents of the Florida Keys and 12 counties in the Florida Panhandle to receive aid through the Federal Emergency Management Agency.

== Background and preparations ==
Hurricane Georges originated as a tropical depression on September 15 in the open Atlantic Ocean. A day later, the National Hurricane Center (NHC) named it Tropical Storm Georges, and upgraded it to a hurricane a day later. Georges moved across the northern Lesser Antilles and much of the Greater Antilles, maintaining hurricane intensity. On September 22 while the hurricane was near the Dominican Republic, the NHC forecast that Georges would strike southeastern Florida near Miami as a major hurricane. However, the agency also noted the uncertainty in its future track, and Georges instead passed through the Straits of Florida. At 15:30 UTC on September 25, Georges made landfall on Key West with maximum sustained winds of 105 mph (165 km/h).

Initial forecasts of a southeastern Florida landfall resulted in the evacuation of over 1.2 million residents, including much of the Florida Keys. Despite the mandatory evacuation order, 20,000 people, including over 7,000 Key West citizens, refused to leave. Some of those who remained to ride out the storm were shrimpers, whose boats were their entire livelihood. Insurance companies refused to insure some of the older shrimp boats, leading shrimpers to ride it out with all they had left. Due to lack of law enforcement, those who stayed in Key West went through red lights, double-parked, and disobeyed traffic laws. Long-time Florida Keys citizens noted the solitude of the time and enjoyed the island for how it once was, rather than the large crowds of tourists. In Miami-Dade, 100,000 residents evacuated from coastal areas, 13,000 of which stayed in local shelters.

== Impact ==
=== South and Central Florida ===
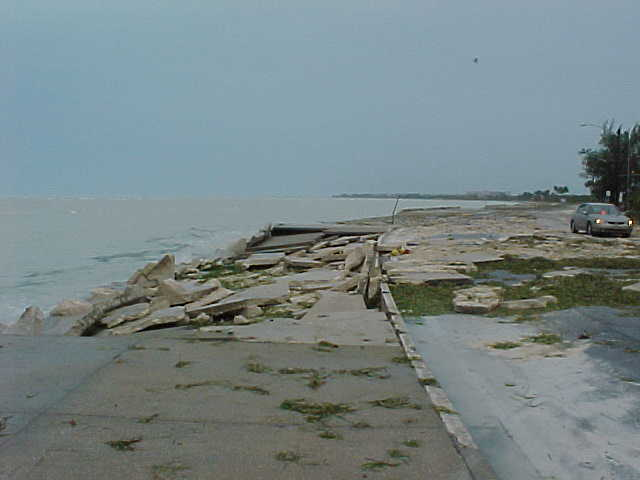
Damage to the seawall along South Roosevelt Boulevard in Key West

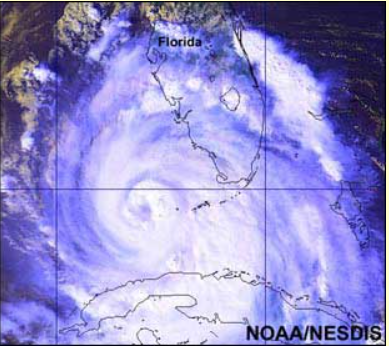
The center of Hurricane Georges passes over Key West, Florida, on September 25, 1998.

The eye of the storm passed near Key West about midday on September 24. Upon making landfall, Hurricane Georges brought a storm surge of up to 12 ft (3.7 m) in Tavernier, with similar but lesser amounts along the Florida Keys. Wind gusts near the center of the storm reached 125 mph (201 km/h). The islands, some only 7 ft (2.1 m) high and 300 yd (270 m) wide, flooded easily, and with up to 10 ft (3.0 m) waves, many parts of the Overseas Highway were under water. Strong winds downed palm trees and power lines, leaving all of the Keys without power. Georges's waves overturned 2 boats in Key West, damaged 1,536 houses, and destroyed 173 homes, many of which were mobile homes. Rainfall amounts amounted to a maximum of 8.41 in (214 mm) in Tavernier, while other locations reported lesser amounts. The cafeteria of Marathon High School flooded after winds twisted off the roof. An unconfirmed report indicated that a tornado touched down on Big Pine Key. Damage in the Florida Keys amounted to $200 million. Two deaths occurred in Monroe County, both on Stock Island and due to indirect causes.

A long-tracked F0 tornado, originally forming as a waterspout, moved from Key Biscayne to Cutler Ridge. The tornado downed trees and power lines and left some damage to cars and homes. Another F0 tornado briefly touched down in Bal Harbour and left similar damage. The Miami International and Tamiami airports both observed sustained winds of 38 mph (61 km/h), while the latter recorded gusts just over 65 mph (105 km/h). Consequently, some power lines fell, leaving about 200,000 people without power in the Miami area. In Palm Beach County, more than 10,000 Florida Power & Light customers lost electricity on September 25, though power was restored for most of them by nightfall. Wind gusts in the county peaked at 49 mph (79 km/h), leaving little damage other than some downed trees, tree limbs, and power lines.

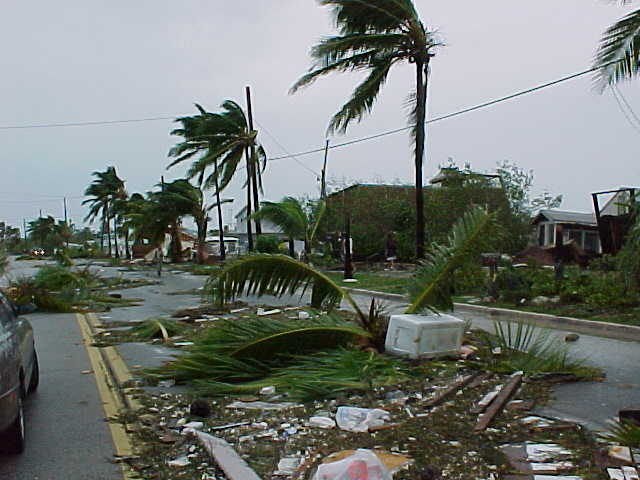
Downed trees in Key West along the old houseboat row on South Roosevelt Boulevard

Two hospice patients died at a shelter in Collier County. On September 25, a waterspout moved onshore near Sebastian and severely damaged a factory. Rated an F1, the tornado caused about $700,000 in damages. Thunderstorm winds associated with Georges left sporadic wind damage along the west coast of Florida. In Charlotte County another F0 tornado tracked for 5 mi (8.0 km), uprooting several trees along its path before dissipating. In DeSoto County, a weak and short-lived tornado near Arcadia damaged some tree limbs and trees before lifting. Rainfall caused the Peace River to reach 12.7 ft (3.9 m) at State Road 70 in Arcadia, more than 1.5 ft (0.46 m) above flood stage. A few homes experienced flood damage as a result. Georges spawned two brief tornadoes in Polk County. The first twister damaged awnings, blew over a few sheds, and downed large trees limbs and power lines just south of Winter Haven. The other tornado, spawned about 7 mi (11 km) northwest of Lakeland damaged two barns and knocked a trailer off its foundation. Another tornado touched down in Hillsborough County near Lutz. However, it lifted before causing any damage.

=== Florida Panhandle ===
Upon making landfall, Hurricane Georges produced a storm surge of up to 10 feet (3.0 m), with higher waves on top of it. Consequently, some degree of beach erosion and coastal flooding occurred, primarily from Mexico Beach westward, while most beach access walkways and staircases were damaged from Panama City Beach westward. As Georges moved slowly through the northern Gulf Coast, it produced torrential rainfall amounting to a maximum of 38 inches (970 mm) in Munson, with other locations reporting over 20 inches (510 mm). Severe inland flooding occurred in the western Florida Panhandle as a result, especially along the watersheds of the Blackwater, Escambia, Perdido, and Yellow rivers. The Perdido, Shoal, and Yellow rivers reached 100-year flood recurrence intervals at some localities. Winds were light, peaking at 50 mph (80 km/h) along the coast, though Eglin Air Force Base recorded a gust of 90 mph (140 km/h). Outer squalls produced a tornado outbreak of 28 twisters, most of which occurred in northwestern Florida.

Heavy rainfall in Escambia County led to many rural dirt roads being washed out and many bridges and highways being closed, such as Interstate 10 near the Alabama-Florida state line. On September 29, the Perdido River crested at 26.3 ft (8.0 m) near Barrineau Park, which remains a record at that site. The local NOAA Weather Radio station remained off air for more than a day when up to 2 ft (0.61 m) of water entered the building housing its equipment and transmitter. A motel on Pensacola Beach received substantial impacts from storm surge and erosion. At least 639 homes experienced damage in Escambia County, with 7 of those destroyed, while public property damaged alone was estimated at $17 million. Three people died in the county due to indirect causes, one from a housefire started by a candle and two others from a car accident. In Santa Rosa County, estimates indicated that more than 75 homes, and perhaps as many as 350, suffered damage due to floodwaters. Evacuations and road closures, including State Road 85, occurred as the Shoal and Yellow rivers overflowed. Six buildings on Navarre Beach were damaged by winds. Floodwaters led to Interstate 10 being closed in the vicinity of Crestview.

An F1 tornado damaged several homes, causing $300,000 in damages, in Okaloosa County. Widespread flooding in Walton County damaged numerous homes and businesses. In Calhoun County flooding isolated up to 20 homes and roads were severely damaged. Flash flooding from local creeks inundated numerous homes, leaving $500,000 in damages. High water near a levee threatened to break through and inundate a small town, resulting in the evacuation of 100 residents. Officials shut down 132 roads, including Interstate 10 due to flooding. Six homes were damaged in Gadsden County and many were left without power. Thirty roads and 20 bridges were washed out in Holmes County and an emergency evacuation of 300 residents was required. A chicken farm was flooded and 48,000 chickens drowned. Damages to roadways in the county amounted to $1.3 million. Flooding in Washington County caused $750,000 in damages to roads.

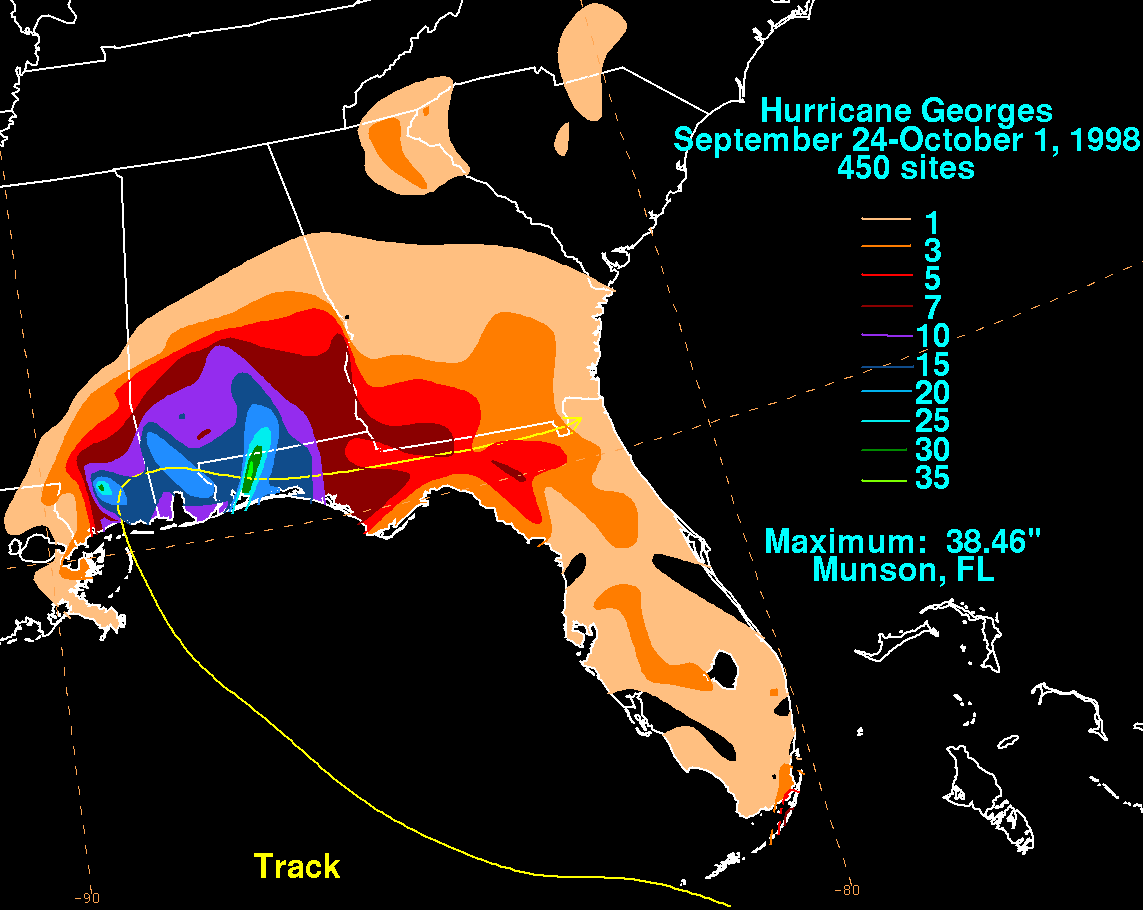
Rainfall totals associated with Hurricane Georges

Flooding in Jackson and Jefferson Counties shut down several roads and high winds downed numerous trees. Street flooding occurred throughout Tallahassee and many trees were downed. One tree fell on a power line and cut power to 1,800 residences in the city. A brief F1 tornado in Bay County damaged 23 homes, causing $250,000 in damages. Near Panama City, rough seas broke through the seawall and inundated waterfront buildings. Strong winds blew the roofs off several structures in the city. Another F1 tornado caused substantial damage to a church and injured one person. Numerous creeks and rivers rose near or above flood stage throughout northern Florida due to the torrential rainfall from Georges. A strong F2 tornado touched down in Suwannee County, destroying seven homes and damaging five others. Five people were injured, two of which sustained serious injuries, and damages from the tornado amounted to $600,000.

Approximately $4 million in damage occurred to Corry Station, Naval Air Station Pensacola, Saufley Field, and Naval Air Station Whiting Field combined, while Eglin Air Force Base alone received roughly $2.5 million in damage. Throughout the Florida Panhandle, damage amounted to at least $100 million (1998 USD, $127 million 2009 USD). In early October, the Florida Division of Emergency Management estimated that Georges inflicted structural impacts on 1,376 homes in the Florida Panhandle, destroying 57, severely damaging 164, and minimally damaging 1,155.

== Aftermath ==
On September 28, 1998, the day that Georges made landfall in Mississippi, President Bill Clinton designated 13 counties in Florida as a disaster area: Bay, Escambia, Franklin, Gadsden, Gulf, Holmes, Jackson, Monroe, Okaloosa, Santa Rosa, Suwannee, Walton, and Washington. Two days later, Governor Lawton Chiles and U.S. Senators Bob Graham and Connie Mack III flew over Escambia and Santa Rosa counties, leading Governor Chiles to ask President Clinton for additional aid. Ultimately, 17 counties received some form of federal assistance, which exceeded $71 million by December. This included $38.2 million in low-interest loans via the Small Business Administration, $19.3 million for clearing debris and repairing infrastructure, $8.5 million for temporary housing or repairing homes with minimal damage, $4.5 million in emergency grants to individuals and families, just over $385,000 for unemployment assistance, and $70,000 for crisis counseling in Monroe County.

In early November, Hurricane Mitch, then a tropical storm, destroyed some buildings in the Florida Keys that suffered damage during Georges.

== See also ==
- Hurricane Georges
- 1998 Atlantic hurricane season
