= Effects of Hurricane Georges in the Lesser Antilles =

Hurricane Georges
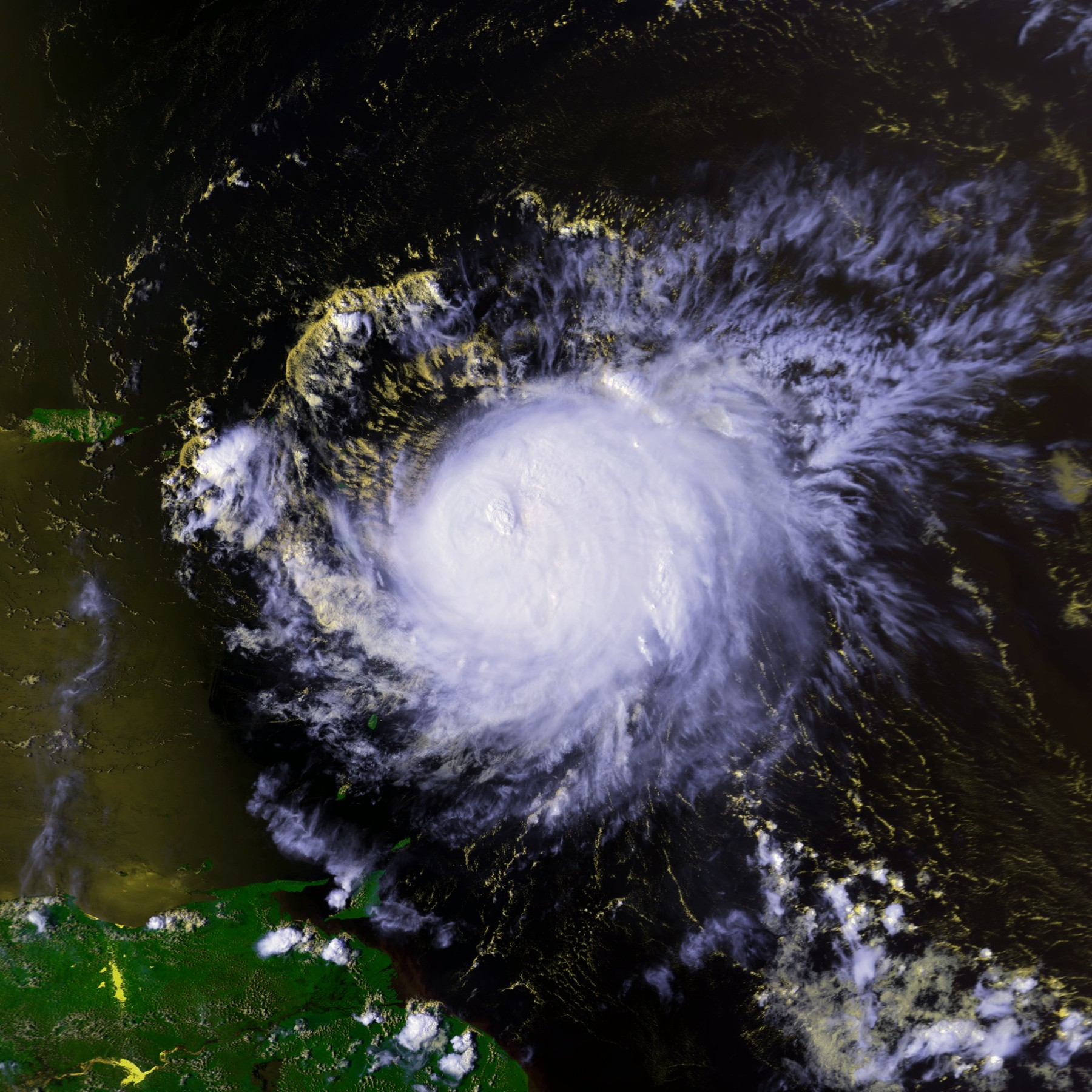
- Hurricane Georges approaching the Lesser Antilles

Category 3 major hurricane
- 1-minute sustained (SSHWS/NWS)
- Highest winds: 115 mph (185 km/h)
- Lowest pressure: 966 mbar (hPa); 28.53 inHg

Overall effects
- Fatalities: 8 direct
- Damage: $655 million (1998 USD)
- Areas affected: Antigua and Barbuda, Guadeloupe, St. Kitts and Nevis, United States Virgin Islands, and the British Virgin Islands
- Part of the 1998 Atlantic hurricane season
- History: Meteorological history; Effects: Lesser Antilles; Puerto Rico; Dominican Republic; Haiti; Cuba; United States; Florida; Louisiana; Tornado outbreak; Other wikis: Commons: Georges images

Hurricane Georges's effects on the Lesser Antilles were minimal in certain islands and major on others. Georges had formed on September 15, 1998, off the African coast. It had quickly strengthened into a Category 4 hurricane on the Saffir–Simpson scale on September 20 when it struck the Lesser Antilles with 185 km/h (115 mph) winds. The islands affected include Antigua, Barbuda, the British Virgin Islands, the United States Virgin Islands, Montserrat, Guadeloupe, Dominica, St. Maarten. St. Kitts and Nevis were also affected and sustained the most damage at US$484 million.

== Background and preparations ==
Hurricane Georges formed on September 15 from a tropical wave in the open Atlantic Ocean. It was named the next day by the National Hurricane Center (NHC), and Georges attained hurricane status by September 17. Moving westward, the hurricane intensified further, reaching peak winds of 250 km/h (155 mph) on September 20. Increased wind shear caused Georges to weaken slightly. However, it was still a major hurricane when Georges moved across the northern Lesser Antilles on September 21. It first hit Antigua, and later moved across Saint Kitts, both with winds of about 185 km/h (115 mph). Georges later moved across the Greater Antilles, striking Puerto Rico, the Dominican Republic, Cuba, Florida, and Mississippi.

Antigua was issued a Hurricane Watch on September 19. The hurricane watch was discontinued two days later on September 21. Several hundred people on the island of Montserrat went into twelve hurricane shelters as Georges passed by with winds of 110 mph (180 km/h). Montserrat was predicted to be hit directly by Georges. However, Georges shifted to the north and spared the island. 87 people had sought shelter from Georges in the British Virgin Islands before it had passed and food had arrived immediately to all 18 shelters. The hurricane watch already in effect for St. Lucia and northward was extended to the US and British Virgin Islands on September 19. The, now Hurricane Warning, was discontinued on September 22. Georges began to affect the United States Virgin Islands on September 21 as a 150 mph (240 km/h) storm. On September 18, a hurricane watch was issued for the island of St. Lucia. The watch was dropped to a Tropical Storm Watch on September 20 and discontinued the next day.

=== Dominica ===
On September 18, the National Disaster Preparedness Committee in Dominica began meetings to prepare for possible impacts from Georges. Residents began stocking up on supplies by this time. For the following two days, the island was placed under a state of high-alert as direct impact from a Category 4 hurricane was anticipated. By the following morning, most businesses had boarded up their windows and roads were quiet. Officials declared that schools would be closed on September 21 and shelters across the island were opened.

== Impact ==
Country	Fatalities	Damage (1998 USD)
Saint Kitts and Nevis	5	$484 million
Antigua and Barbuda	3	$160 million
British Virgin Islands	0	$9.4 million
United States Virgin Islands	0	$2 million
Total	8	$655.4 million

=== Antigua and Barbuda ===
Damage around the islands of Antigua and Barbuda was extensive, amounting to $160 million. Georges killed three people and seriously injured fifteen others. A total of 3,338 people were left homeless and about 2,000 homes either damaged or destroyed. On Antigua, 250 homes were destroyed and many others were damaged. Supplies of electricity, telephone services and water were all curtailed by Georges. Both islands' hospitals and airports suffered extensive damage. Total damage is $160 million.

=== Guadeloupe ===
The weakening hurricane spared the island as it passed 25–30 miles to the north, causing moderate damage (houses and roofs, uprooted trees, power lines and outages, beach erosion) especially in Grande-Terre. In Basse-Terre, minor to moderate damage was common; the worst damage was to the banana crops, 85% to 100% devastated, with a cost of millions of francs. The maximal rainfall was 5 to 6 inches in this area.

The Met office in Desirade, east of Guadeloupe had a 75 mph wind and an 88 sustained gust. In Raizet, they experienced a 43 mph wind and a maximal gust near 72 mph. The minimal pressure fell to 1000–1001 mb for several hours.

Météo France forecast 24 hours prior to impact a 50 mph max winds with gust near 90 mph and a minimal pressure around 985 mb, meaning the worst has been avoid.

=== British Virgin Islands ===
No major damage was reported to public buildings in the British Virgin Islands. Some of the islands' homes had roofs blown off. The environment suffered major damage. There were many reports of eroded soil in areas where construction was in progress. Some of the soils were planted on roads in mangrove farms and in the sea, which could have potentially killed sea life. National Parks around the islands suffered minor damage except for Queen Elizabeth Park, which had many fallen trees. None of the schools in the area suffered any damage and opened again four days after Georges had passed. There were no fatalities in the islands and one minor injury was reported. There was no major damage to the islands' medical buildings. Pipe damage was found in two areas, but there was no damage to the sewage systems. The total damage in the British Virgin Islands was valued at US$9.404 million.

=== U.S. Virgin Islands ===
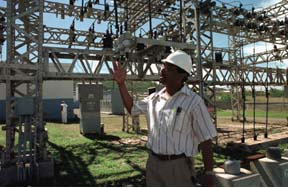
Director of the Virgin Islands Water and Power Authority showing the islands' improved power grid structures

As Georges moved through the northern end of the Lesser Antilles, it produced significant rainfall and strong winds over the United States Virgin Islands. Maximum rainfalls reached 6.79 inches (172 mm) at the airport in St. Croix and 5.26 inches (134 mm) at St. Thomas Airport. The strongest sustained winds and gusts were recorded on St. Croix as well, measuring 74 and 91 mph (119 and 146 km/h) respectively. A total of 20 homes were destroyed and 50 others sustained damage. Most of the losses were confined to agriculture and livestock. 55 boats were sunk across the islands. Trees were uprooted and several power lines were downed throughout St. Croix by high winds, leaving some residences without power. In two communities, the homes of three residents lost their roofs. A trailer was destroyed at a trailer park. However, compared to the intensity of Georges during its passage of the islands, relatively few people, 15% of the island's customers, lost power. This was due to the improved power grid set up across the island for this type of event. Total losses on the island were estimated at $2 million (1998 USD).

=== Saint Kitts and Nevis ===
Five fatalities were reported due to Georges on Saint Kitts and Nevis. The supply of electricity and telephone services were severely affected. The southern tip of St. Kitts, a major tourist site, was left in need of repair. Harbor hotels, ports and airports had extensive damage and half of the sugar crop was destroyed. Sheds at ports were damaged severely enough to result in losses of cargo. Port Zante sustained the worst damage, catwalks were displaced or destroyed and cruise ship platforms were destroyed. In that port alone, damage reached EC$15 million (US$5.6 million). A total of 1,440 homes were destroyed on the island, leaving 2,500 people homeless. Roughly 60% of the structures on the island were damaged of which 25% were destroyed. Most of the commercial and public buildings lost their roofs. Shelters on the island sustained severe damage during the storm, some becoming unusable following assessment. The local airport sustained significant damage, particularly to the control tower and main terminal. Total damage to the airport amounted to EC$10 million (US$3.7 million). Roughly 55% of the industrial buildings lost their roofs, leaving EC$3.5 million (US$1.3 million) in damage and 6,000 people without a job. The economic impact of Georges was estimated at EC$100 million (US$37.4 million) and losses in tourism amounted to EC$20 million (US$7.4 million).

On Nevis, there were numerous reports of minor injuries but no loss of life. Most of the island was left without power and water supply and 35% of structures on the island were damaged. Over 300,000 heads of livestock were killed during the storm. Damage to infrastructure and the electrical grid amounted to $1 million and $2.5 million respectively. Damage to the local hospital amounted to $1.9 million. Across both islands, 90% of the hospitals were unable to function after the storm, causing EC$12 million (US$4.4 million) in damage. Estimated losses of tourism and export for 1999 were placed at EC$74.7 million (US$28 million). Sport centers sustained varying damage, costing roughly EC$5 million (US$1.8 million).

Damage in St. Kitts totaled EC$1.2 billion (US$445 million). Total damage on Nevis amounted to $39 million. The total damage from the storm was nearly twice the country's Gross Domestic Product of US$271 million.

=== Netherlands Antilles ===
Driving winds and rains caused moderate flooding and washed out roads around the island. Heavy rains caused mudslides on Montserrat's main volcano. Teams began on September 21 to clean up fallen debris from roads around the island. Georges shifted ferry services to Antigua and caused the cancellation of a concert on the island. The SSS islands (Saba, Sint Maarten and St. Eustatius), suffered moderate damage from Hurricane Georges. On Saba, the island's hospital lost its roof and patients had to be evacuated to a geriatric home. Later, the geriatric home lost its roof. The water system, airport and utilities were also damaged, the maximal sustained gust has been 153 knots (283 km/h) in the elevated airport. In Sint Maarten, roofs were blown from houses, power lines and outages wes damaged, trees were uprooted, houses been damaged by the waves and some boats were sunk. The Princess Juliana recorded a 54 knots (100 km/h) sustained winds and sustained gust at 85 knots (157 km/h) and a minimal pressure down to 997 mb (29.38 In Hg). In Saint Eustacius, no communication was possible throughout the island.

=== Elsewhere ===
In Dominica, the storm produced intermittent rainfall and gusty winds but no major damage. to Anguilla, damage was minor to moderate. In Martinique and St. Lucia, winds gusted up to 40 mph (64 km/h) with less than 1/4 of an inch of rain around those island. Those islands was mildly affected by Georges.

== Aftermath ==
=== Antigua and Barbuda ===
On September 23, Antigua and Barbuda were declared disaster areas following the severe impacts from Hurricane Georges. The Office of U.S. Foreign Disaster Assistance paid for 51 water jugs, 11 rolls of plastic sheeting and one water bladder for Barbuda. They also provided 101 rolls of plastic sheeting, 5 water bladders and 502 water jugs to Antigua. Total cost of the items came to about US$500,300. The Red Cross distributed numerous supplies to shelters set up across the islands including: 2,000 meals and first aid, 105 cots, 200 sets of toiletries, 100 comfort kits and water purification tablets.

=== St. Kitts and Nevis ===
Immediately following the storm, the Government of St. Kitts and Nevis imposed a strict curfew, starting at 8:00 pm and ending 6:00 am local time on St. Kitts. The airport was closed for at least three days to allow short-term repairs to take place. On September 22, the Prime Minister of St. Kitts and Nevis declared a national disaster for the island of St. Kitts. Following the storm, the government of the islands requested supplies for shelters that housed roughly 3,000 people; these supplies included bottled water, 3,000 blankets, 130 tents and plastic sheeting. They also requested chainsaws and 12 lines crewmen to assist in reconstruction. By September 23, additional personnel were deployed to assist the emergency operations center and 400 kits of plastic sheeting was provided by the Caribbean Disaster Emergency Response Agency. Barbados supplied 480 boxes of ready-to-eat meals and plastic sheeting. Guyana deployed personnel to assist in cleanup and reconstruction efforts. The Caribbean Electric Utility Services Corporation sent assessment teams to assist in recovery on Nevis. The cost of clearing debris throughout the islands amounted to $38.2 million.

In St. Kitts and Nevis, six disaster relief teams were deployed from nearby Antigua and Barbuda. The teams assisted the 600 families left homeless and distributed plastic sheets to roughly 1,000 families. Red Cross shelters were set up on the islands to provide residents with food and emergency needs. During the two years after Georges, the government underwent a project to restore infrastructure and tourism. The estimated cost to repair hospitals reached $1.6 million and, in combination with Antigua and Barbuda, local mitigation efforts cost $1.15 million. By November 28, 2001, $350,000 in loans was given out to 106 people on the islands. In all, the restoration project cost roughly $3.5 million and was paid out over several years. On September 26, the Government of Taiwan donated US$1 million in disaster funds to the islands.

The estimated cost to repair damage on St. Kitts alone amounted to $60 million. Roughly 6,000 people were left unemployed and 8,500 were unable to go to school following the storm. Schools were projected to remain closed for up to three months to allow repairs while hotels would remain closed for up to a month for the same reason. To meet immediate financial losses, the government requested EC$1.2 million (US$450,000) from other countries. They also requested import needs of EC$29.3 million (US$11 million) for 1998 and EC$10.6 million (US$4 million) for 1999. The World Bank agreed to loan the country EC$22.7 million (US$8.5 million) over a three-year span while the Eastern Caribbean Central Bank planned to provide EC$6.6 million (US$2.5 million) over several years.

=== British Virgin Islands ===
After Georges passed, cases of acute hemorrhagic conjunctivitis were found around the British Virgin Islands and other islands nearby. Roughly US$8.5 million from the International Bank for Reconstruction and Development was given to the islands.

=== Elsewhere ===
St. Lucia received $3 million in funds by the International Bank for Reconstruction and Development for 15 years of maturity.

== See also ==
- Effects of Hurricane Georges in the Dominican Republic
