= Effects of Hurricane Georges in Haiti =

Hurricane Georges
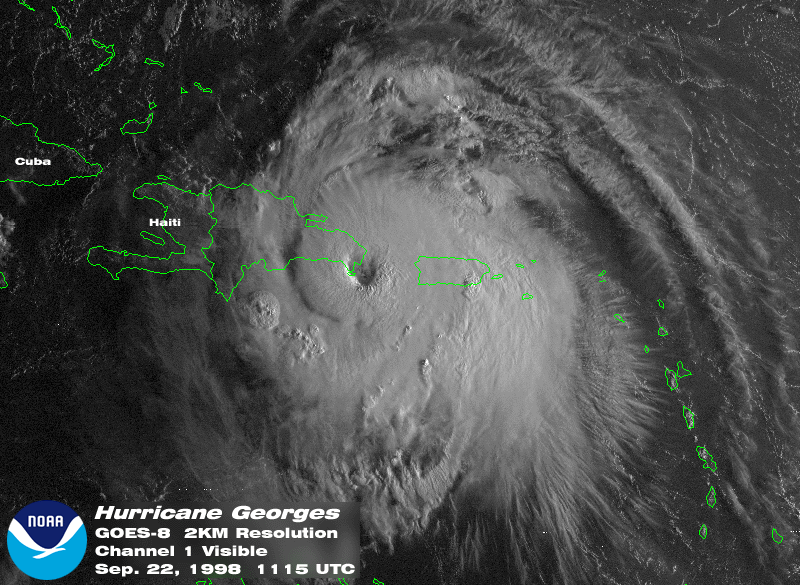
- Georges at landfall in the Dominican Republic as a Category 3 hurricane

Category 1 hurricane
- 1-minute sustained (SSHWS/NWS)
- Highest winds: 75 mph (120 km/h)
- Lowest pressure: 990 mbar (hPa); 29.23 inHg

Overall effects
- Fatalities: 209
- Damage: $200 million (1998 USD)
- Areas affected: Haiti
- Part of the 1998 Atlantic hurricane season
- History: Meteorological history; Effects: Lesser Antilles; Puerto Rico; Dominican Republic; Haiti; Cuba; United States; Florida; Louisiana; Tornado outbreak; Other wikis: Commons: Georges images

The effects of Hurricane Georges in Haiti included about $200 million (1998 USD) in damages and 209 fatalities. Georges impacted the country at Category 1 strength.

== Background and preparations ==
Hurricane Georges formed on September 15 from a tropical wave in the open Atlantic Ocean. It was named the next day by the National Hurricane Center (NHC), and Georges attained hurricane status by September 17. Moving westward, the hurricane intensified further, reaching peak winds of 250 mph (155 mph) on September 20. Increased wind shear caused Georges to weaken slightly. However, it was still a major hurricane when Georges moved across the northern Lesser Antilles and Puerto Rico on September 21. On the next day, it struck the Dominican Republic with winds of 195 km/h (120 mph), and subsequently weakened while moving across Hispaniola. Georges emerged from Haiti into the Windward Passage on September 23 as a minimal hurricane. It later struck Cuba and the United States.

A hurricane warning was first issued on September 21, and ended on September 23. Haiti declared a state of alert on September 22, with businesses and schools being closed down and schools being used for possible shelters.

== Impact ==
Georges was already a weakened hurricane upon reaching Haiti, but cities and other areas of low elevation were still in danger of high winds, mudslides, and flooding. Haiti's capital received minimal damage, although there was flooding in low-lying areas and the main commercial port was damaged. The rest of the country, however, experienced a significant number of flash floods due to deforestation along the mountains. Mudslides destroyed or severely damaged many houses, leaving 167,332 homeless. Floods left the greatest impact along the northern coastline from Cap-Haïtien to Gonaïves. On the southern coast, the head of a U.S.-based medical team, stranded for several days by flooding in the remote town of Belle-Anse, anticipated a rise in malnutrition, disease, homelessness and poverty. Hurricane Georges caused citizens to have no access to clean water, which added to the already unsanitary conditions from dirty flood water and rampant diseases. In all, there were 209 fatalities, although there could be more. The cause of deaths was mainly due to the poor infrastructure in the country and the spread of diseases along with malnutrition.

Like in the Dominican Republic, the agricultural sector suffered extreme damage. After a severe drought in 1997, severe flooding from the hurricane stopped any chances of recovering quickly. Most of the country's significant crop land, including Artibonite Valley, suffered total losses. Up to 80% of banana plantations were lost, while vegetable, roots, tubers, and other food crops were destroyed. In addition, thousands of livestock were missing. Total agricultural losses amounted to $179 million (1998 USD, $281 million 2019 USD).

== Aftermath ==
The country requested food assistance in the aftermath of the hurricane to alleviate the serious losses. Organizations such as the BHR/OFDA offered monetary assistance and provided limited amounts of resources such as blankets, water, and plastic sheeting. CWS sent some of its members to Haiti to scope the extent of aid needed and provided kits containing cleaning supplies and toiletries. CWS and FEMA partnered together to gather volunteers and oversee rebuilding efforts. Cuba provided medical assistance and gave additional training to Haitian doctors through an agreement made with Haiti.

== See also ==
- Hurricane Georges
- Effects of Hurricane Georges in the Dominican Republic
- 1998 Atlantic hurricane season
