= 1998 hurricane season =

1998 hurricane season may refer to:

- The 1998 Atlantic hurricane season
- The 1998 Pacific hurricane season
