= 1998 Pacific hurricane season =

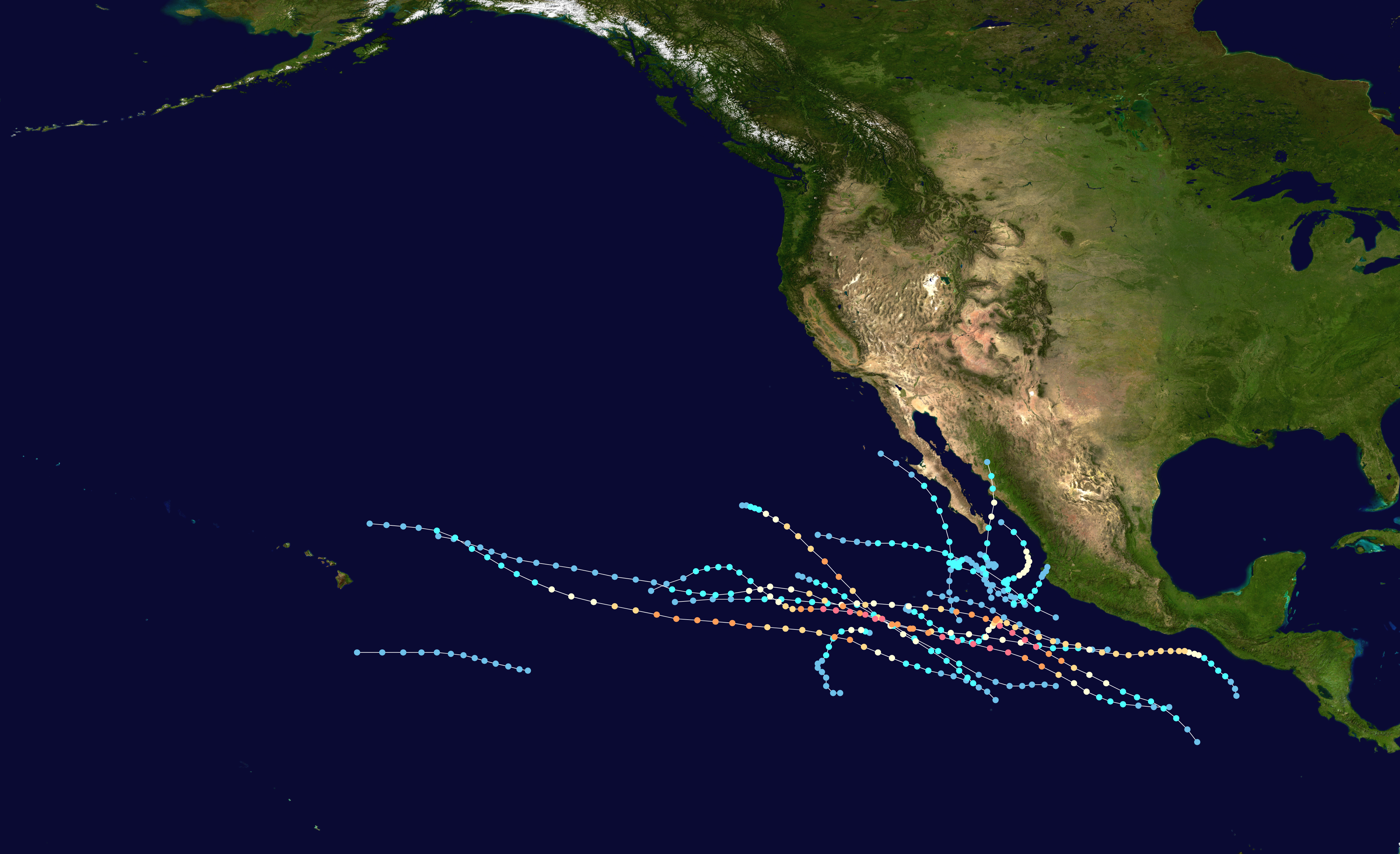
- Season summary map

Seasonal boundaries
- First system formed: June 11, 1998
- Last system dissipated: October 26, 1998

Strongest storm
- Name: Howard
  - Maximum winds: 150 mph (240 km/h) (1-minute sustained)
  - Lowest pressure: 932 mbar (hPa; 27.52 inHg)

Seasonal statistics
- Total depressions: 16
- Total storms: 13
- Hurricanes: 9
- Major hurricanes (Cat. 3+): 6
- ACE: 134
- Total fatalities: 54 total
- Total damage: $850 million (1998 USD)

Related articles
- Timeline of the 1998 Pacific hurricane season; 1998 Atlantic hurricane season; 1998 Pacific typhoon season; 1998 North Indian Ocean cyclone season

The 1998 Pacific hurricane season was a near-average Pacific hurricane season, with 16 total systems forming; despite this, it had nine hurricanes and six major hurricanes, which was well above average. The season officially started on May 15 in the eastern Pacific and on June 1 in the central Pacific, and ended on November 30; these dates conventionally delimit the period during which most tropical cyclones form in that region. The first tropical cyclone developed on June 11, about ten days later than the normal start of the season. The final storm of the year, Hurricane Madeline, dissipated on October 20. Storm activity in the Central Pacific Hurricane Center's warning zone was low, with just one tropical depression observed in the region. Two tropical cyclones from the eastern Pacific (Darby and Estelle) also entered the central Pacific; the former did so as a hurricane.

The most notable tropical cyclone of the year was Hurricane Isis, which killed fourteen people when it made landfall on southern Baja California Sur and coastal Sinaloa in Mexico. Isis caused considerable damage in the nation, destroying more than 700 homes and damaging dozens of cars. It later produced sporadic rainfall in the southwestern United States, leading to some traffic accidents. In addition to Isis, Tropical Storm Javier moved ashore the coast of Jalisco in Mexico; the country also experienced indirect effects from four other storms, all of which remained offshore. One tropical cyclone, Hurricane Lester, affected Central America, causing two deaths in Guatemala, and later brought heavy rains to southern Mexico. Three tropical cyclones brought light to moderate rainfall to the southwestern United States, and one hurricane produced rough surf along the coast of California. Hurricane Madeline contributed to a deadly and costly flood in southern Texas.

== Seasonal summary ==
List of costliest Pacific hurricane seasons
| Rank | Cost | Season |
|---|---|---|
| 1 | ≥$13.1 billion | 2023 |
| 2 | $4.47 billion | 2013 |
| 3 | ≥$3.15 billion | 1992 |
| 4 | $2.46 billion | 2024 |
| 5 | ≥$2.09 billion | 2014 |
| 6 | ≥$1.64 billion | 2018 |
| 7 | $1.62 billion | 2010 |
| 8 | $1.31 billion | 1982 |
| 10 | $918.15 million | 2026 |
| 10 | $850 million | 1998 |

The season produced 13 named storms, slightly below the average of 15 named storms per season. However, the season total of nine hurricanes was one above the average, and the total of six major hurricanes surpassed the average of three. Activity during the season was hindered by the northward movement of the Intertropical Convergence Zone (ITCZ). The ITCZ, which is normally situated south of the Gulf of Tehuantepec, shifted northward into Central and Southern Mexico, making the cyclone closer to cooler sea surface temperatures, hence limiting the number of storms that formed during the season. Although a semi-permanent anticyclone persisted through the summer of 1998, causing most of the storms to remain at sea, some storm did threaten the Baja California Peninsula due to a weakness in the anticyclone. Except for Hurricane Kay, all of the storms of the season originated from tropical waves. Accumulated Cyclone Energy is, broadly speaking, a measure of the power of a storm multiplied by its duration, so longer-lived hurricanes have higher ACEs. The total ACE for the season was 134 units. Because several storms in 1998 were long-lasting or intense, the season's ACE was near-normal. Hurricane Howard had the highest ACE, measuring 29.3 units.

== Systems ==
=== Tropical Storm Agatha ===
- Tropical storm (SSHWS)
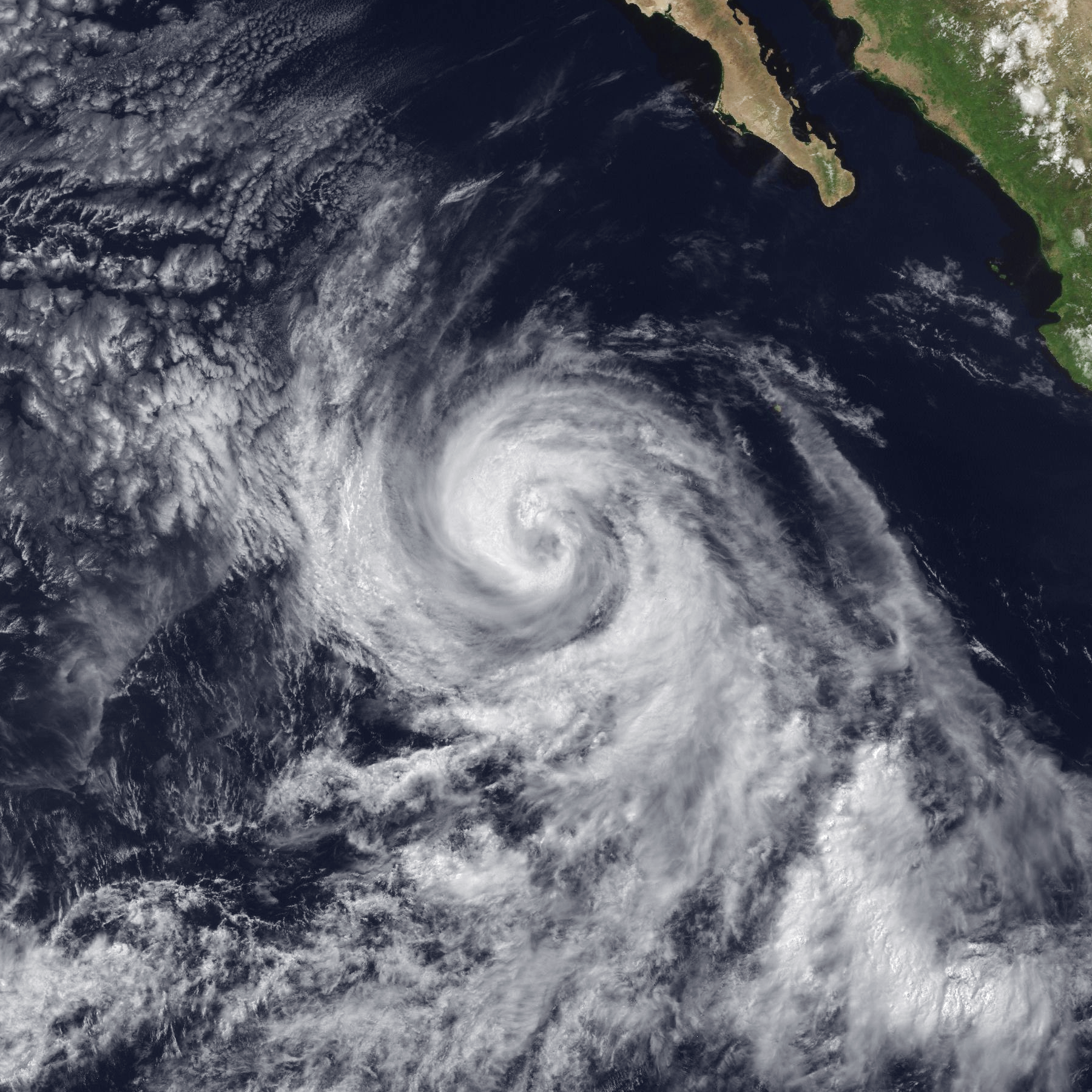
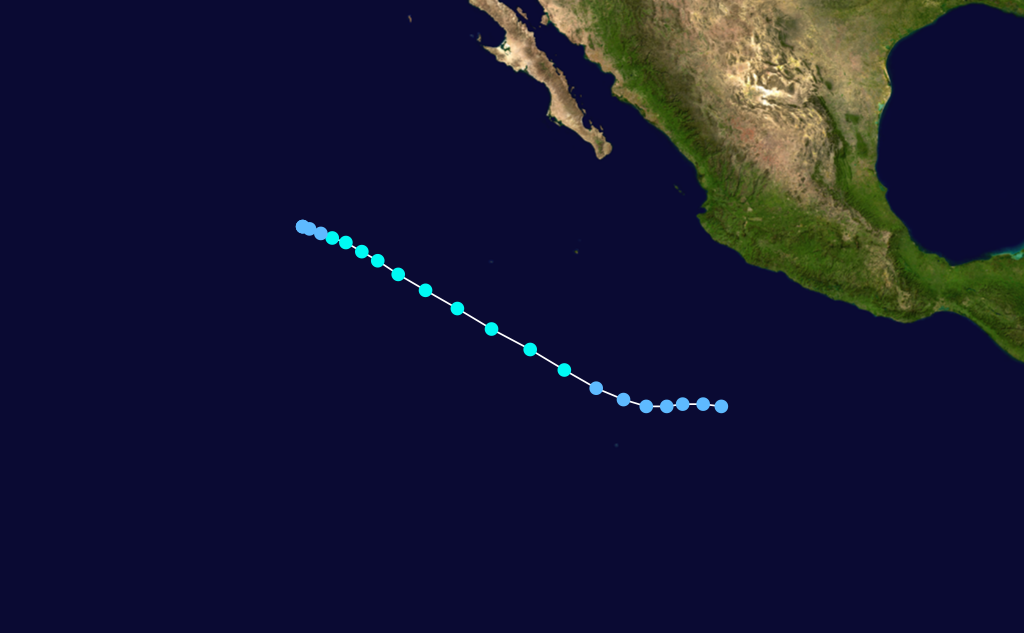
- Duration: June 11 – June 16
- Peak intensity: 65 mph (100 km/h) (1-min); 993 mbar (hPa)

A poorly defined tropical wave crossed Central America into the eastern Pacific Ocean on June 8. As it tracked westward under the influence of a ridge to its north, a broad circulation developed. Gradually, the dominant center of circulation became better defined, with increasingly organized convection and developing banding features. By early on June 11, the center became sufficiently associated with the convection for the National Hurricane Center (NHC) to classify the system as Tropical Depression One-E. This occurred while the area of unsettled weather was about 460 miles (740 km) south-southwest of Acapulco, Mexico.

The center of the depression was not initially well defined, with restricted outflow in the eastern half of the circulation. As such, the depression failed to attain any significant organization in the days subsequent to its formation. Later, an approaching tropical wave merged with the depression, resulting in a trend of intensification and increased organization. By June 13, the NHC upgraded the depression to tropical storm status, and gave it the name "Agatha". Agatha was about 650 miles (1,050 km) south-southeast of Cabo San Lucas when it became a tropical storm. As Agatha became a tropical storm, forecasters predicted that it would not strengthen further, due to its forecast track passing over cooler waters. However, Agatha quickly strengthened, developing a curved band of convection wrapping around its center, and early on June 11 it attained a peak intensity of 65 mph (105 km/h) while about 615 miles (990 km) southwest of the southern tip of Baja California. Agatha maintained peak winds for about 12 hours before moving over colder waters and gradually weakening. On June 15, it degenerated back into a tropical depression, and a day later, it dissipated over the open waters of the Pacific Ocean.

=== Tropical Depression Two-E ===
- Tropical depression (SSHWS)
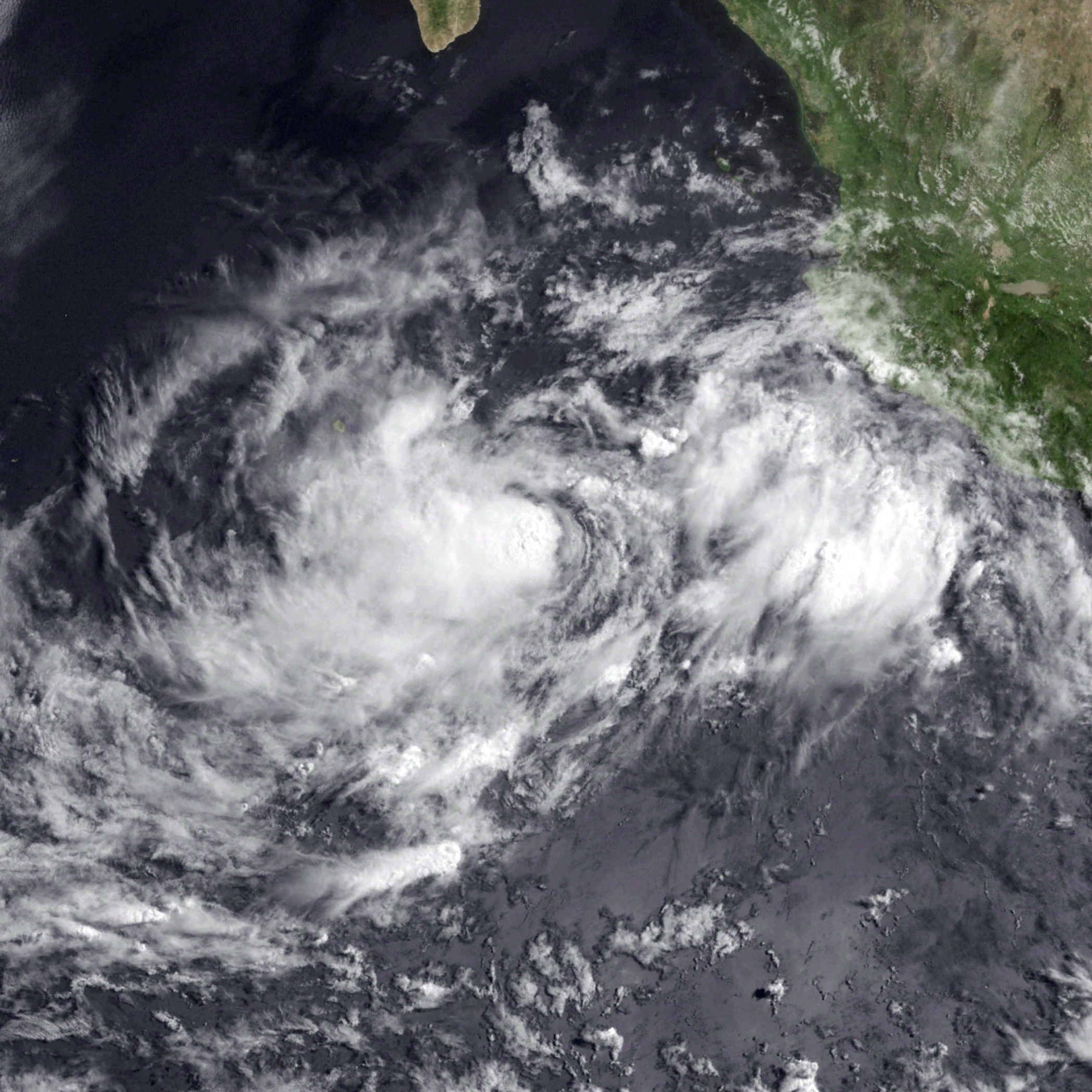
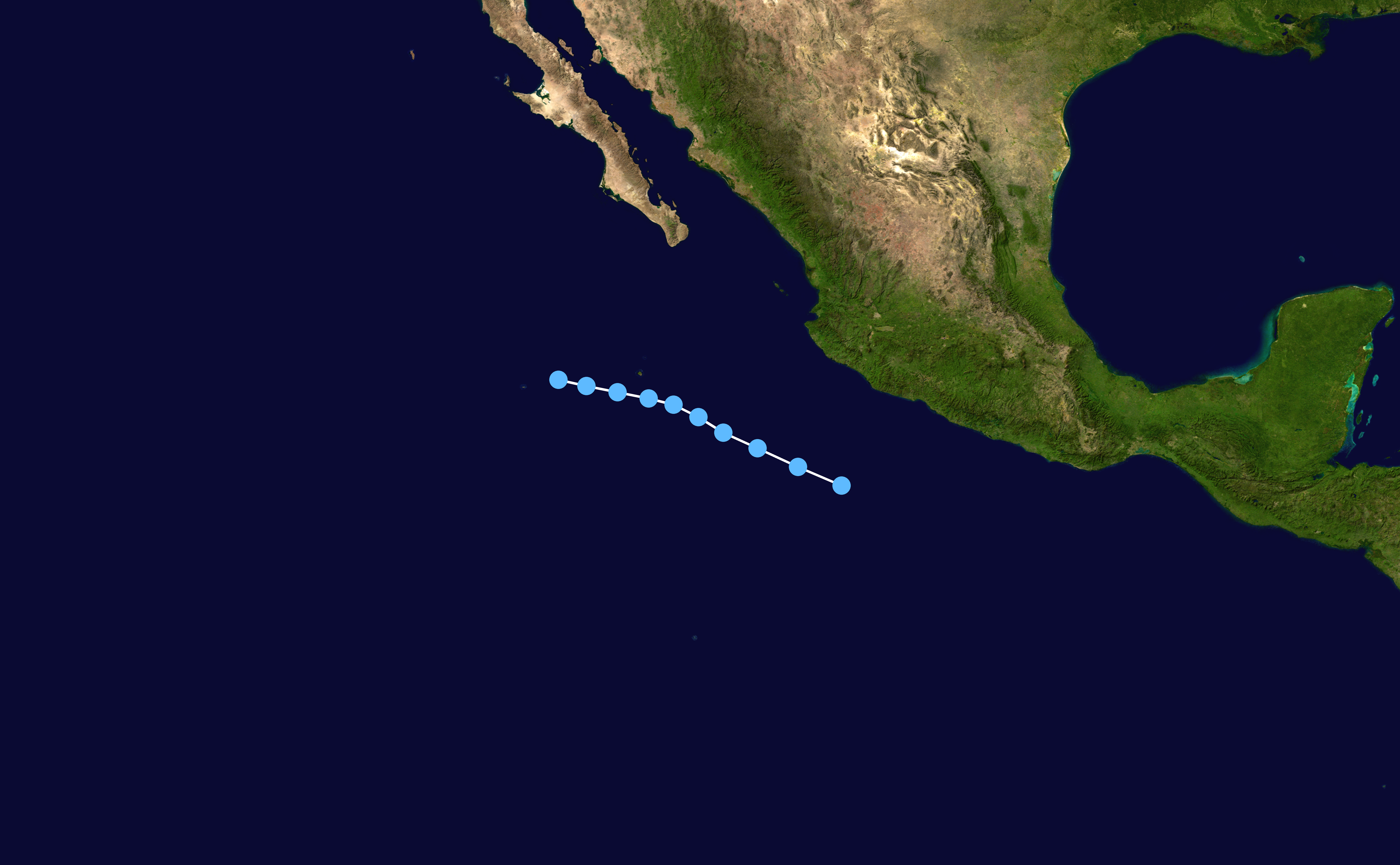
- Duration: June 19 – June 22
- Peak intensity: 35 mph (55 km/h) (1-min); 1003 mbar (hPa)

A few days later, another westward-moving tropical disturbance paralleled the southern coast of Central America and Mexico. Convection in the area organized steadily, and late on June 19, the system developed into Tropical Depression Two-E about 260 miles (420 km) south-southwest of Manzanillo, Mexico. On becoming a tropical depression, the system maintained a large, elongated, low-level circulation with some banding features and restricted outflow due to wind shear. The National Hurricane Center first predicted that the depression would intensify, reaching winds of 50 mph (80 km/h), though two computer models projected it to quickly dissipate. Under the influence of a ridge over Mexico, the depression moved to the west-northwest, and, under the influence of increasing wind shear, the depression failed to organize significantly. By June 20, the circulation center was partially exposed, and was located to the northeast of the primary convection – traits that signal a weak storm. Two-E approached tropical storm status, though deep convection waned after the system moved over cooler waters. On June 21, the National Hurricane Center issued the last advisory on the depression, stating that the depression maintained a very well-defined, low-level circulation, but had no convection associated with the system. Locally heavy rains fell across southwest Mexico in association with this system, peaking at 5.55 inches (141 mm) at Las Gaviotas/Compostela.

=== Hurricane Blas ===
- Category 4 hurricane (SSHWS)
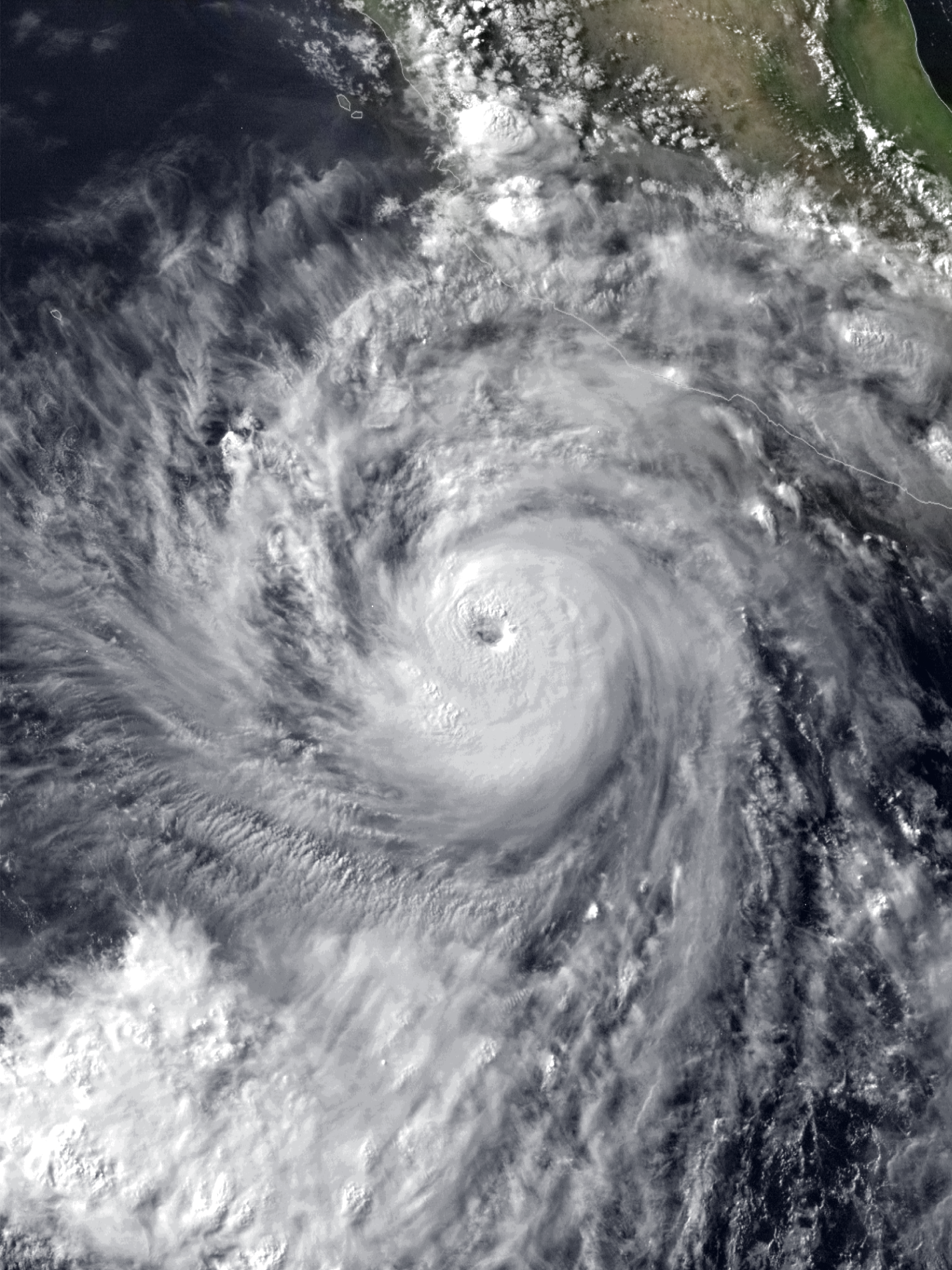
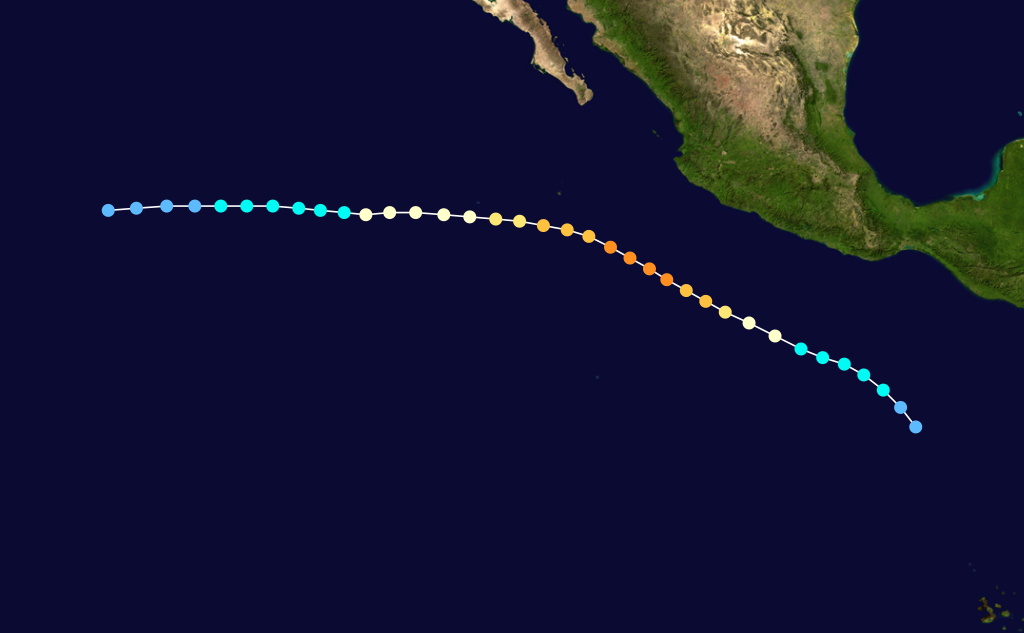
- Duration: June 22 – June 30
- Peak intensity: 140 mph (220 km/h) (1-min); 943 mbar (hPa)

On June 8, a tropical wave emerged off the coast of Africa. The wave remained weak and nondescript as it crossed the Atlantic Ocean and entered the eastern Pacific Ocean on June 19. An area of convection developed and organized along the wave's axis, and the National Hurricane Center began to employ Dvorak classifications on June 20. Convective banding features increased as the broad circulation became better defined, and on June 22, the disturbance developed into Tropical Depression Three-E about 575 miles (925 km) south of the Gulf of Tehuantepec. Well-defined steering currents resulted in a general west-northwestward movement. Deep convection concentrated near the center, and about 12 hours after becoming a tropical depression, the system strengthened into Tropical Storm Blas about 400 miles (640 km) south of Puerto Angel, Oaxaca.

Tropical Storm Blas continued to organize as it moved parallel to the Mexican coast. Banding features increased, and on June 23 the storm attained hurricane status about 345 miles (555 km) southwest of Acapulco. The next day, an eye developed and became apparent on satellite imagery, while upper-level outflow became better defined. Blas quickly strengthened and reached its peak intensity on June 25, with maximum sustained winds of 140 mph (230 km/h), while about 575 miles (925 km) south-southeast of the southern tip of Baja California. Temperatures warmed in the convection around the eye, though the eye remained visible for several days as Blas turned west under the influence of a ridge to its north. On June 28, it degenerated into a tropical storm after entering an area of cooler water. Blas weakened to a tropical depression on June 30, and a day later was considered to have dissipated due to a lack of convection near the center. A remnant low-level cloud swirl persisted for several days, passing well to the south of Hawaii on July 5 before dissipating. The Associated Press attributed 4 deaths from a mudslide in Michoacán to Blas. However, as the primary convection remained offshore, the National Hurricane Center did not consider the deaths related to the hurricane. The threat of Blas prompted officials in Acapulco to close the port to all navigation.

=== Tropical Storm Celia ===
- Tropical storm (SSHWS)
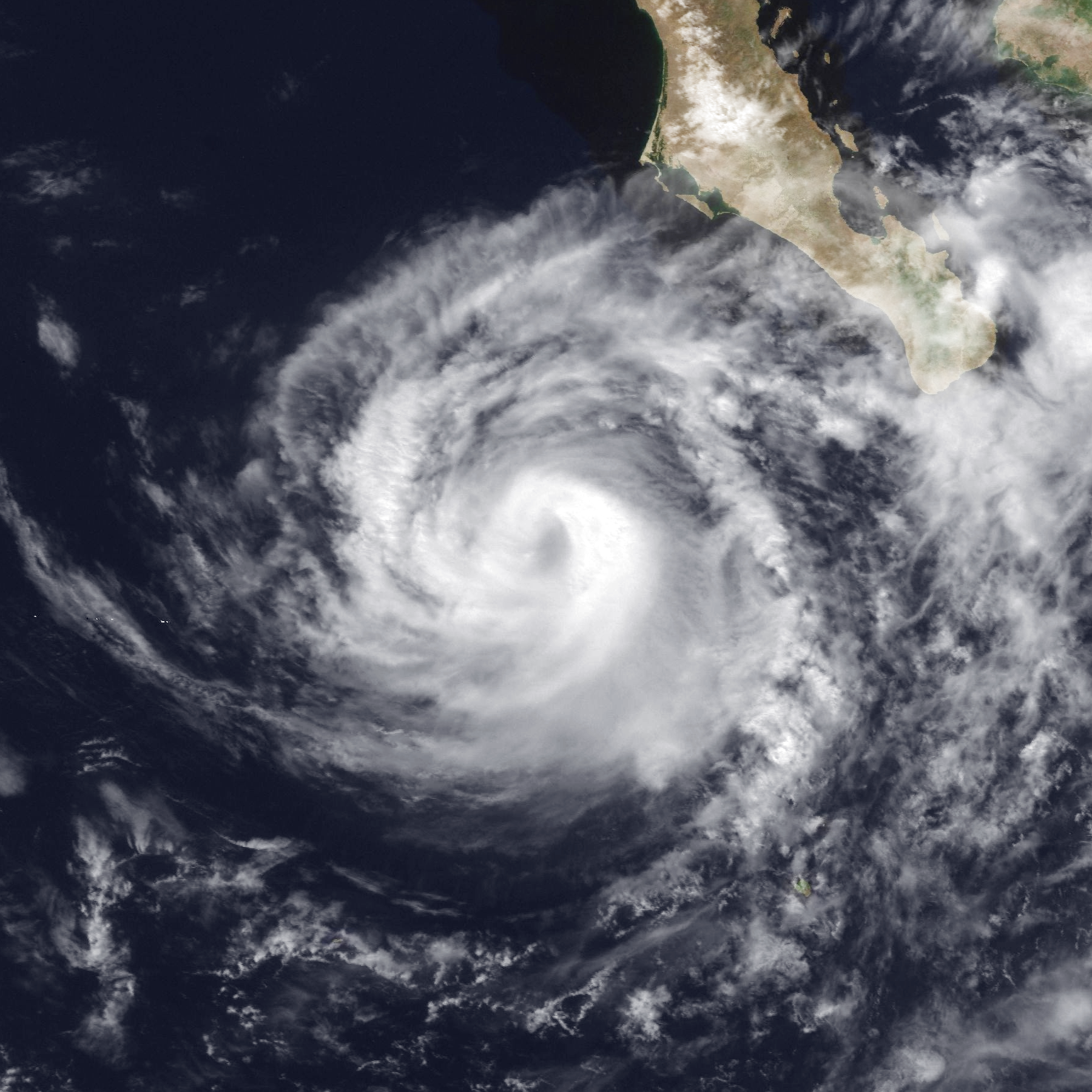
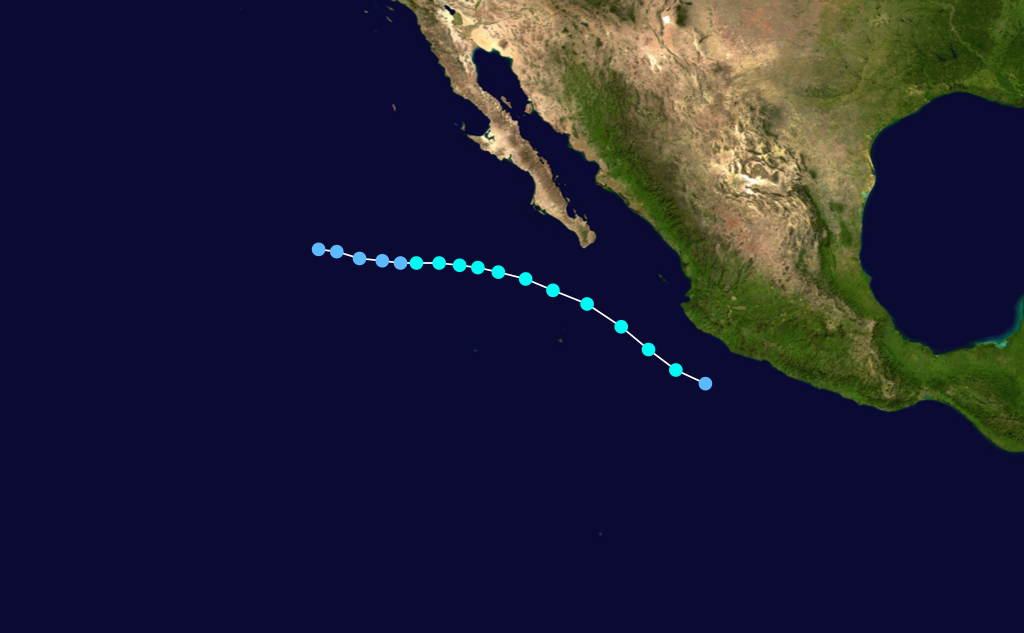
- Duration: July 17 – July 21
- Peak intensity: 60 mph (95 km/h) (1-min); 997 mbar (hPa)

On July 1, another tropical wave emerged off the coast of Africa. It moved westward due to strong wind shear without further organization, and crossed Central America into the eastern Pacific Ocean on July 11. An area of organizing convection developed along the wave axis, and Dvorak classifications began on July 13, while the tropical wave was south of the Gulf of Tehuantepec. The cloud pattern soon became disorganized, and the area of disturbed weather continued west-northwestward. On July 16, convection increased and organized into banding features; early on July 17, the system developed into Tropical Depression Four-E about 150 miles (240 km) south of Manzanillo, Mexico. Soon after becoming a tropical depression, the storm rapidly organized and intensified into Tropical Storm Celia six hours after becoming a tropical depression. The tropical storm initially moved northwestward, and briefly threatened southern Baja California. As a result, the government of Mexico issued a tropical storm warning on July 18 for La Paz southward. Shortly thereafter, a mid- to upper-level anticyclone turned Celia to the west-northwest and forced it to pass about 150 miles (240 km) south-southwest of Cabo San Lucas. On July 19, Celia attained maximum sustained winds of 60 mph (97 km/h) before moving over cooler waters and diminishing in convection. The storm degenerated into a tropical depression on July 20, and Celia dissipated early on July 21, well away from the Mexican coastline.

The precursor tropical disturbance produced locally heavy rainfall along the south coast of Mexico. Authorities in Mexico closed the port at Acapulco to small fishing and recreational boats, and advised larger craft to use caution.

=== Hurricane Darby ===
- Category 3 hurricane (SSHWS)
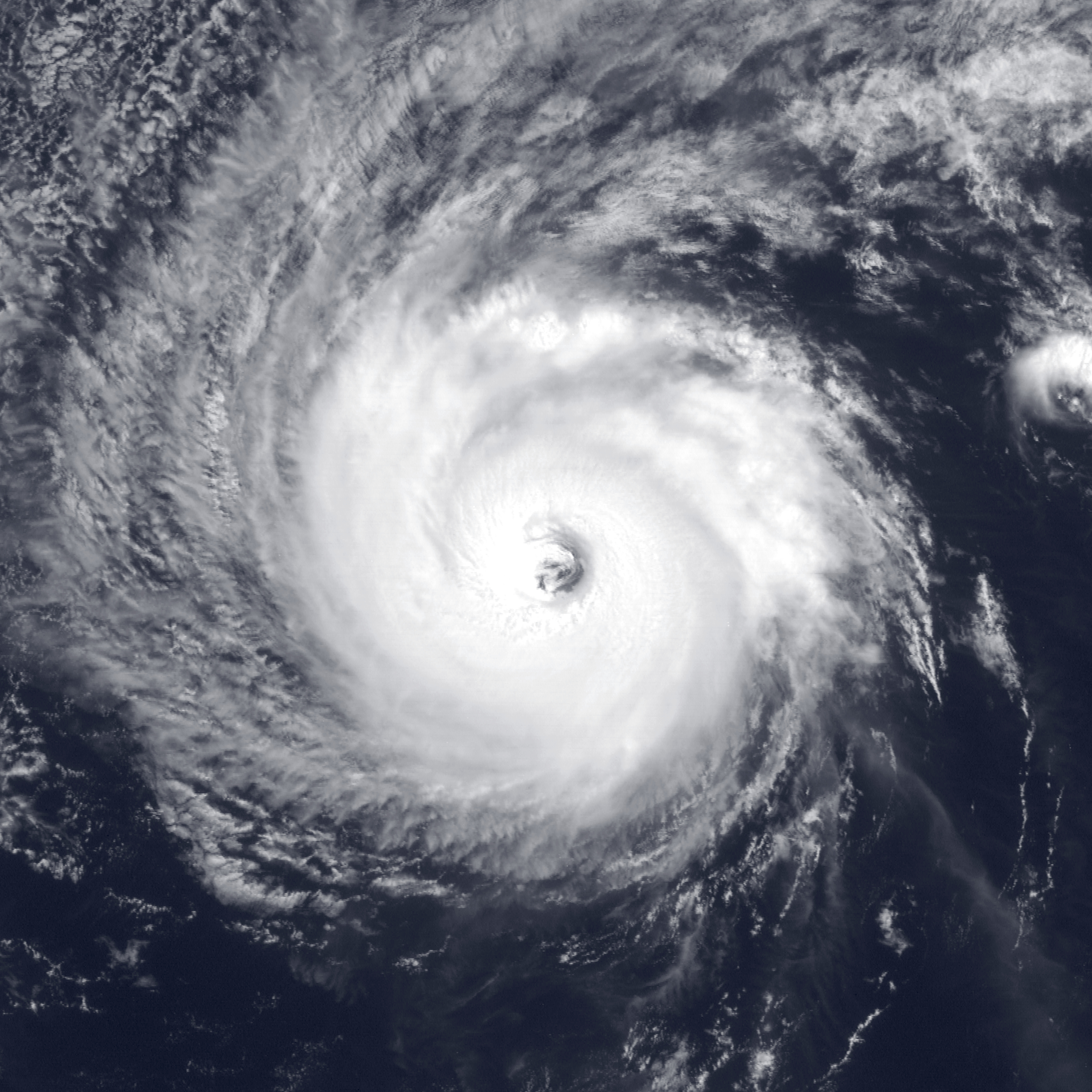
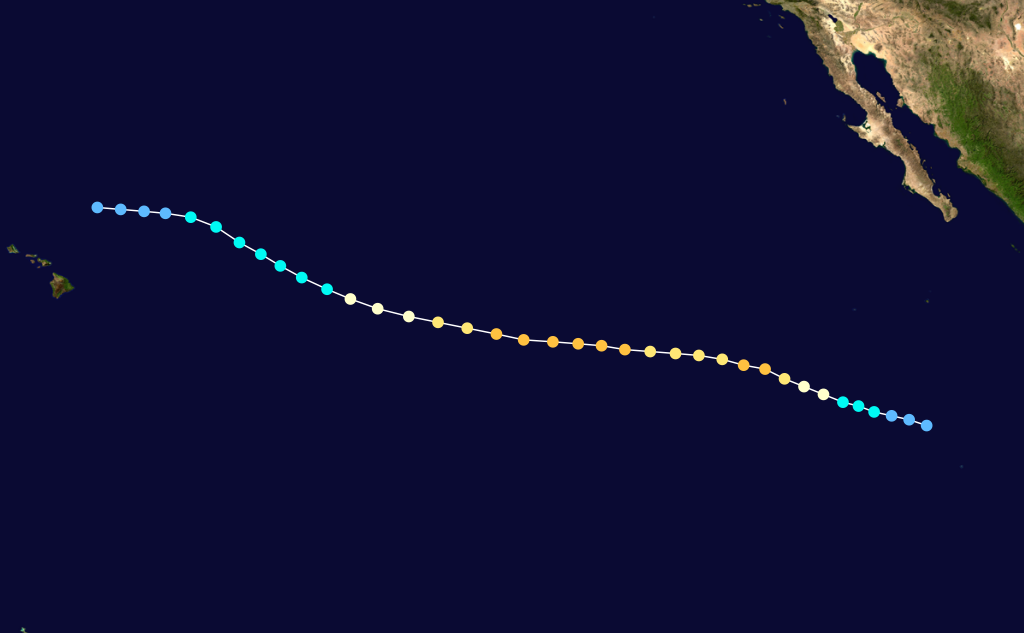
- Duration: July 23 – August 1
- Peak intensity: 115 mph (185 km/h) (1-min); 958 mbar (hPa)

A tropical wave moved off the coast of Africa on July 4. It tracked westward across the Atlantic Ocean with little increase in convection, and crossed Central America into the Pacific Ocean on July 16. Three days later, convection began to increase along the wave axis while the wave was well to the south of Acapulco, Mexico. On July 21, Dvorak classifications began as the cloud pattern displayed curvature on satellite images. Convective banding features gradually developed, and it is estimated that the system organized into Tropical Depression Five-E early on July 23 about 720 miles (1,160 km) south of the southern tip of the Baja California peninsula. Under the influence of a mid- to upper-level ridge to its north, the depression tracked west-northwestward. Convection became more concentrated as outflow organized further, and 18 hours after the depression first developed, it intensified into Tropical Storm Darby.

Located in an area conducive to further development, Darby attained hurricane status on July 24, subsequent to the development of a 17-mile (27 km)-wide eye. The eye became more distinct while surrounded by an area of deep convection, and on July 25 the hurricane reached peak winds of 115 mph (185 km/h) about 850 miles (1,370 km) southwest of Cabo San Lucas. The eye soon disappeared on satellite imagery, believed to be from an eyewall replacement cycle, and Darby's winds weakened to about 105 mph (169 km/h). A 25-mile (40 km) eye next developed, and on July 26, the hurricane re-intensified to reach peak winds of 115 mph (185 km/h). For a 30-hour period, Darby attained the characteristics of an annular hurricane, retaining a well-defined structure with few banding features for an extended period. The hurricane began to weaken while entering an area of cooler water and increased wind shear, and after crossing into the jurisdiction of the Central Pacific Hurricane Center, Darby weakened to a tropical storm on July 29. The storm degenerated into a tropical depression on July 31, and early on August 1, Darby dissipated a moderate distance north of the Hawaiian Islands.

=== Hurricane Estelle ===
- Category 4 hurricane (SSHWS)
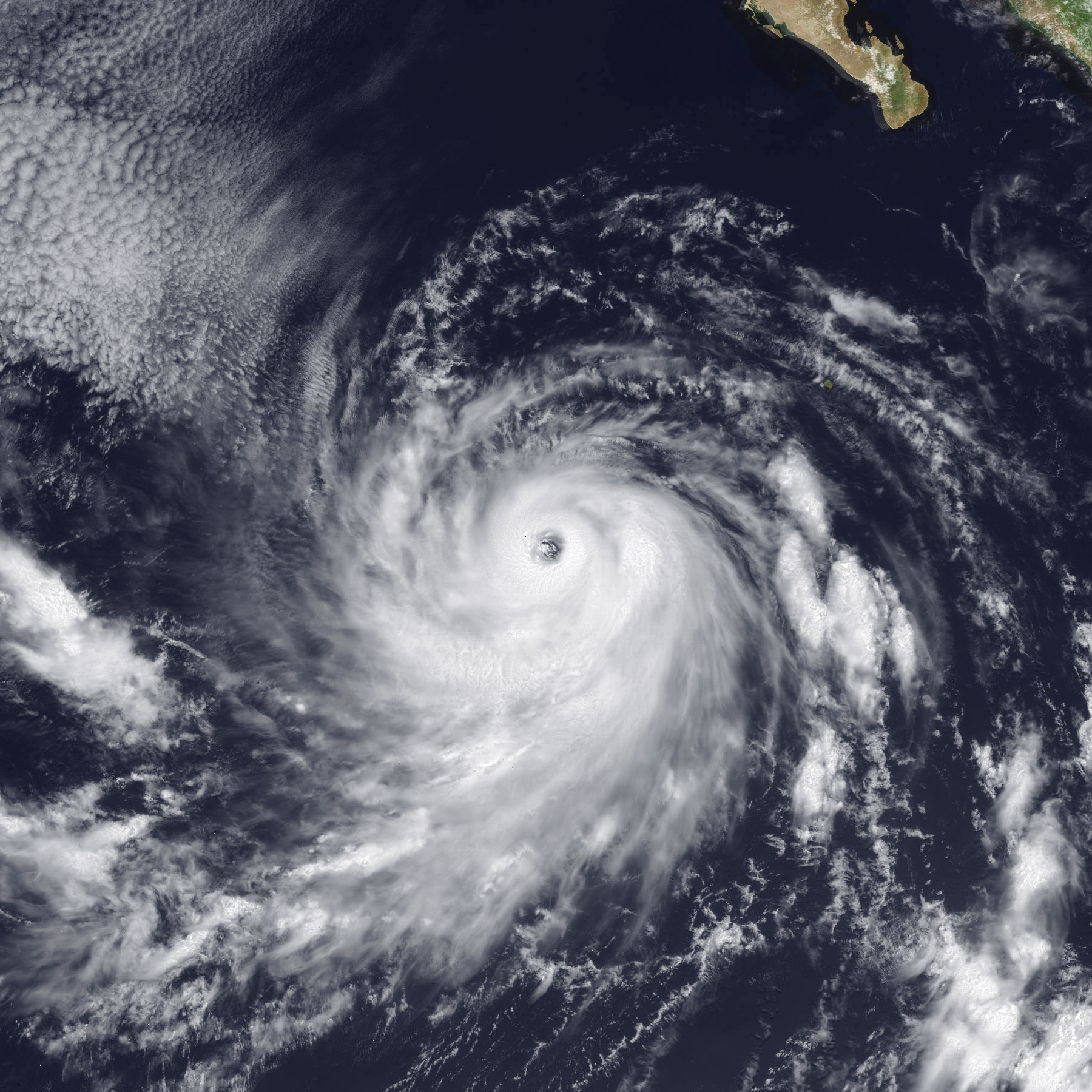
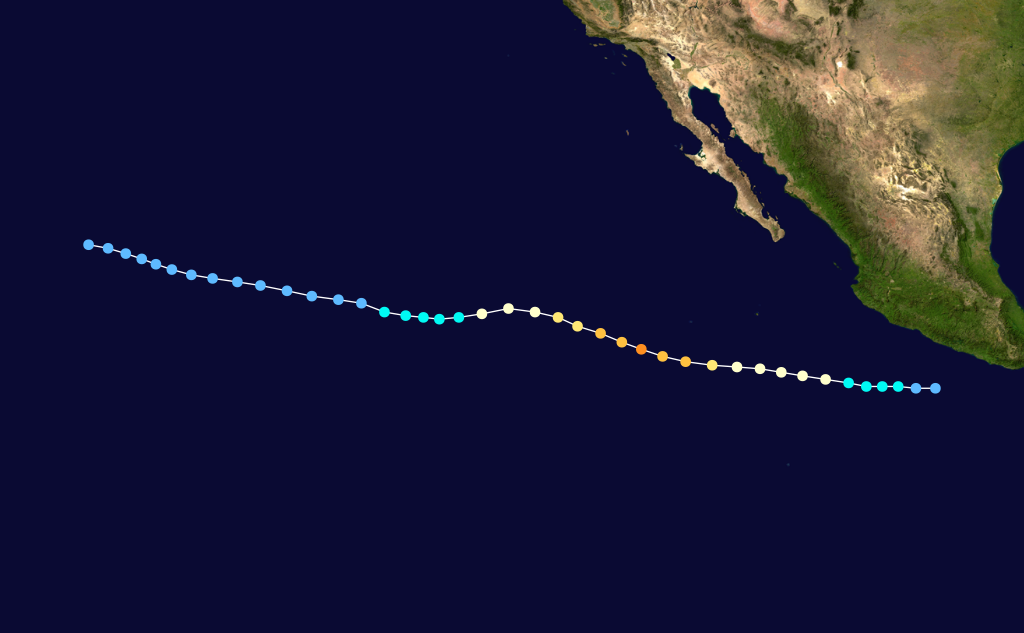
- Duration: July 29 – August 8
- Peak intensity: 130 mph (215 km/h) (1-min); 948 mbar (hPa)

On July 18, a tropical wave exited the western coast of Africa, and moved westward across the Atlantic Ocean with sporadic convection but no development. The wave moved across the Caribbean Sea and the southern Gulf of Mexico before crossing Central America into the eastern Pacific Ocean on July 28. Early on July 29, Dvorak classifications began on the system, and subsequent to the formation of banding features and a surface circulation, the system developed into Tropical Depression Six-E about 170 miles (270 km) southeast of Manzanillo, Mexico. The depression continued to organize, with increasing convection and distinct upper-level outflow, and early on July 30 the depression intensified into Tropical Storm Estelle.

Tropical Storm Estelle gradually intensified as it tracked west-northwestward, a motion caused by a large anticyclone to its north. On July 31, the storm attained hurricane status about 550 miles (890 km) south-southeast of the southern tip of Baja California. Its intensification continued as a well-defined eye about 30 miles (48 km) in diameter became visible on satellite imagery, and on August 2 Estelle reached its peak intensity of 135 mph (217 km/h). The hurricane soon began to weaken as deep convection diminished and the eye disappeared on satellite imagery. Two days after peaking in intensity, Estelle weakened to tropical storm status. Late on August 4, the convection associated with the storm dissipated, and the next day the storm weakened to tropical depression status. Convection briefly re-developed on August 6, though increased wind shear and cooler water weakened the depression further. Two days later, Estelle dissipated about 400 miles (640 km) east-northeast of the Hawaiian Islands. High surf from Estelle impacted southern California, resulting in a number of lifeguard rescues. The storm disrupted the trade winds around Hawaii, resulting in light winds and rain showers on Kauai and Oahu.

=== Tropical Storm Frank ===
- Tropical storm (SSHWS)
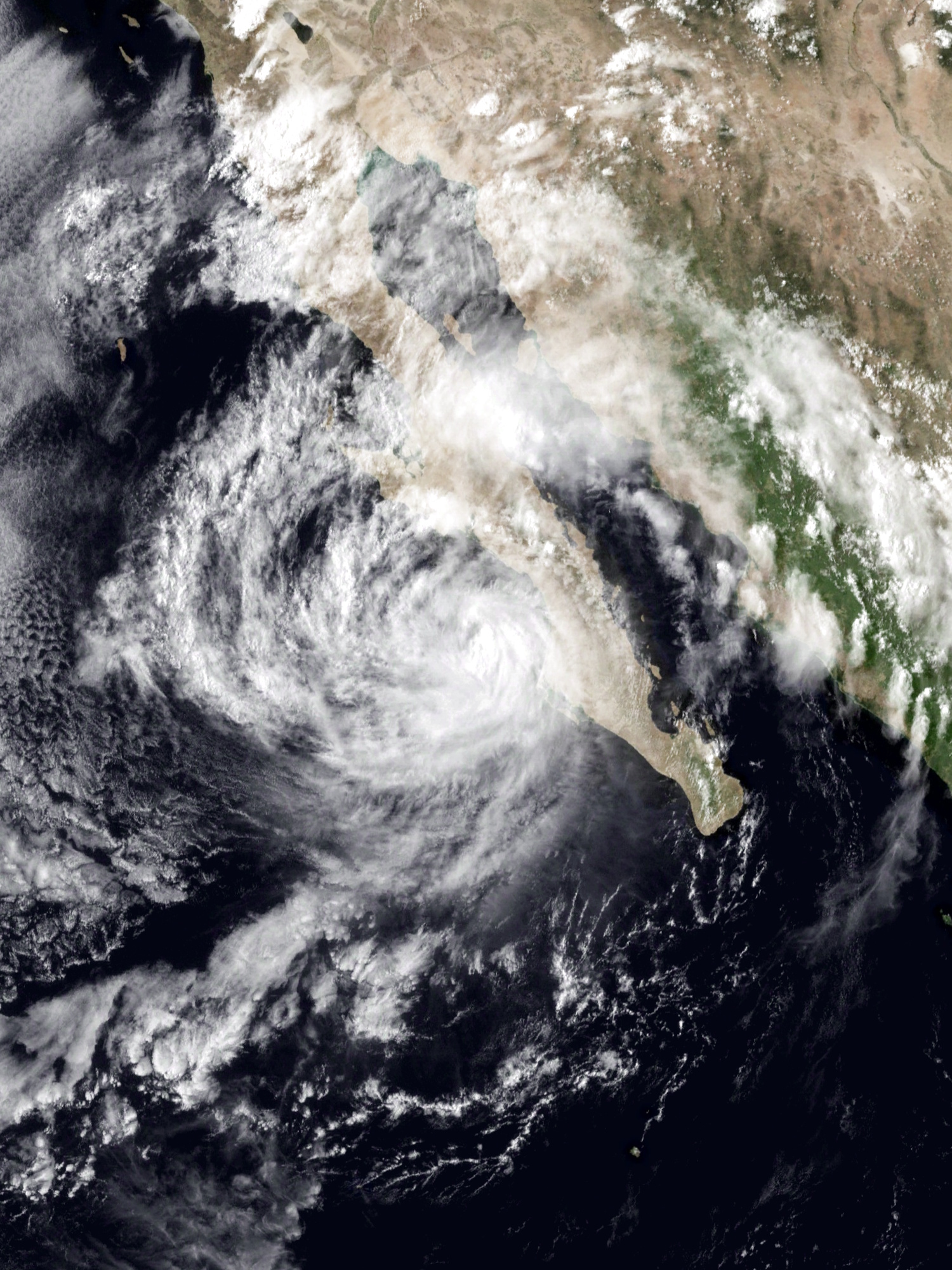
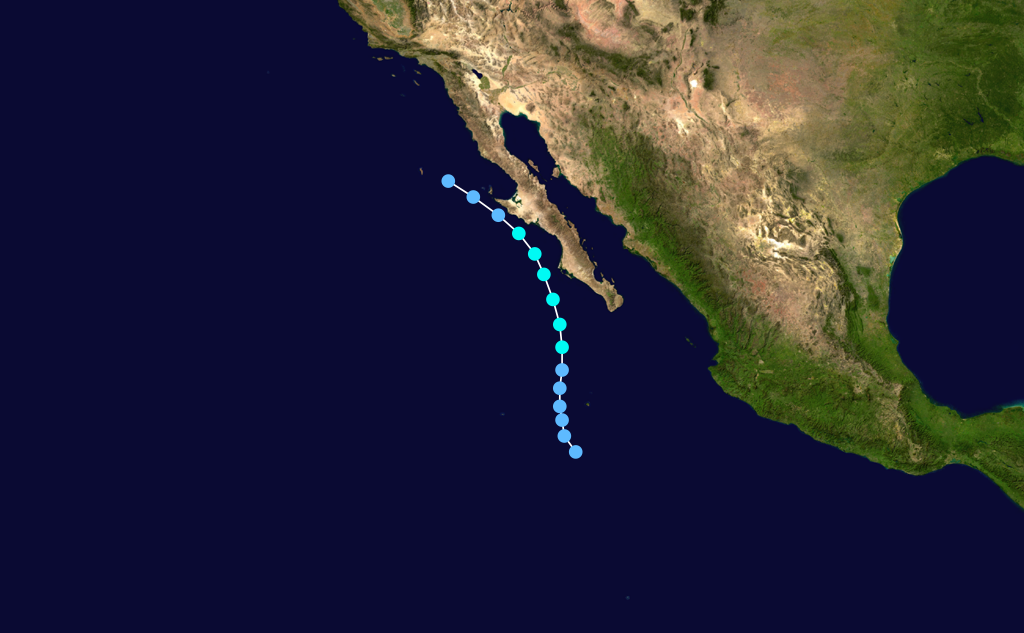
- Duration: August 6 – August 10
- Peak intensity: 45 mph (75 km/h) (1-min); 1001 mbar (hPa)

On July 19, a tropical wave moved off the coast of Africa. A mid-level circulation developed to the south of Cape Verde on July 22, though the wave became less distinct as it continued westward. The wave axis crossed Central America into the eastern Pacific Ocean on July 31. Convection steadily increased, though it was not until August 4 that the convection began to organize. Dvorak classifications began on August 4, and subsequent to the formation of a low-level circulation the system developed into Tropical Depression Seven-E on August 6 about 550 miles (890 km) south of the southern tip of the Baja California Peninsula. The depression tracked generally northward, under the influence of a ridge over Mexico and a mid-level trough to its west. The center of the depression was initially elongated, with northerly wind shear impacting the structure of the cyclone. This at first prevented further strengthening, though convection increased and organized into banding features as it moved through an area of warm water. On August 8, the depression intensified into Tropical Storm Frank, and it soon turned to the north-northwest, brushing the western coastline of Baja California. On August 9, Frank reached peak winds of 45 mph (72 km/h) about 105 miles (169 km) west-northwest of Ciudad Constitución. It turned to the northwest, with a portion of the circulation of the land, and steadily weakened after moving over cooler water. On August 10, Frank dissipated a short distance off Baja California.

On August 8, the government of Mexico issued a tropical storm warning for portions of the southwestern Baja California Peninsula. Officials ordered the evacuation of some residents near Cabo San Lucas, whose port was closed, due to the threat of mudslides. Gusty winds and moderate rainfall were reported in a localized area of Baja California Sur, with rainfall peaking at 9.61 inches (244 mm) at Santa Anita, near Los Cabos. Moisture from Frank extended into the southwestern United States, producing more than 2 inches (51 mm) of rain in southern California and Arizona. One news agency attributed three deaths to the storm.

=== Hurricane Georgette ===
- Category 3 hurricane (SSHWS)
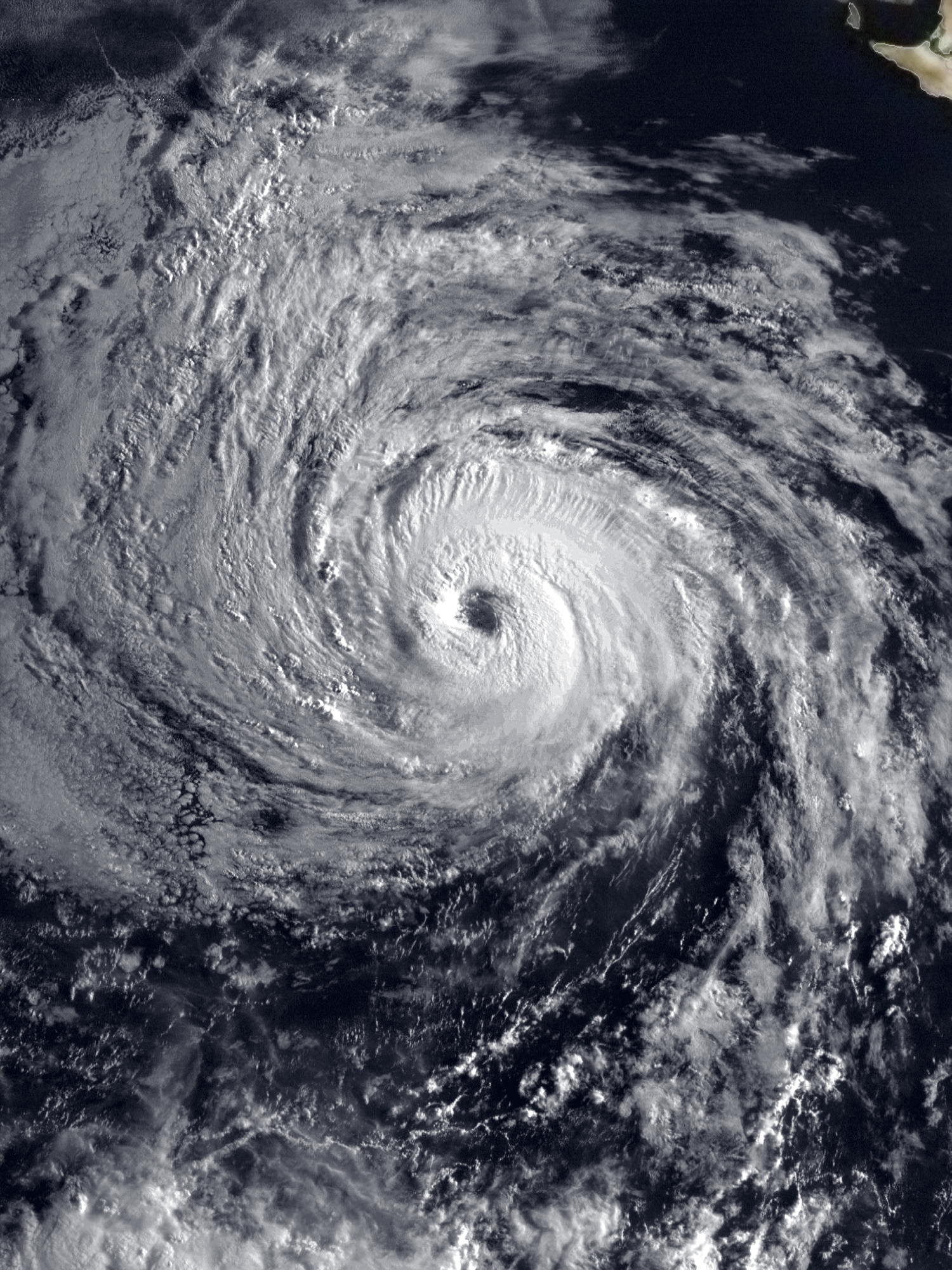
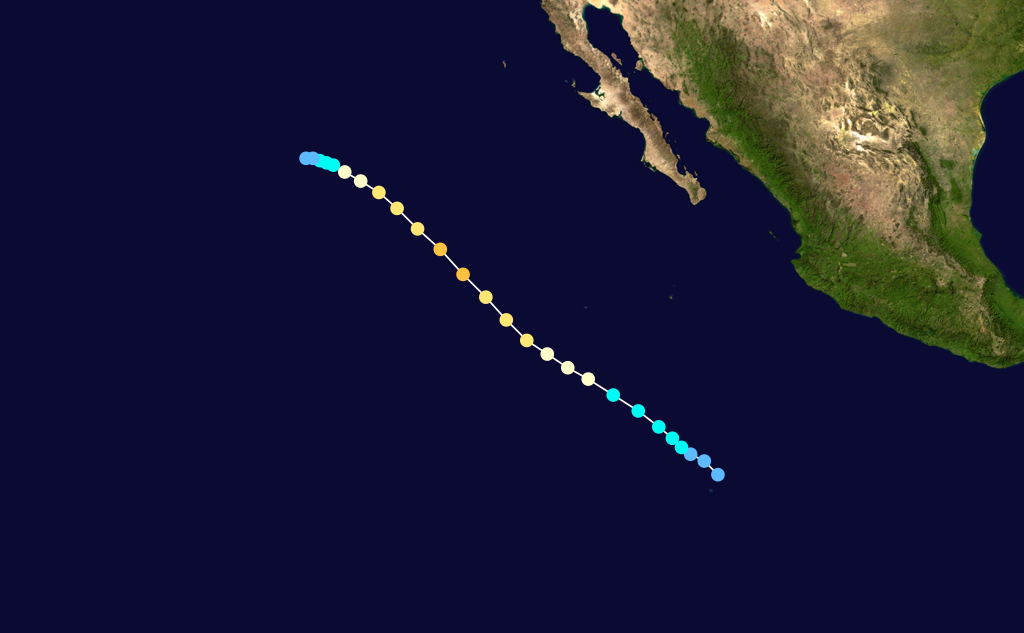
- Duration: August 11 – August 17
- Peak intensity: 115 mph (185 km/h) (1-min); 960 mbar (hPa)

A tropical wave was first observed in the eastern Pacific Ocean on August 4 in association with the Intertropical Convergence Zone. It tracked westward, and by August 9 a low-level circulation formed well to the south of Mexico. Banding features increased as the system detached from the Intertropical Convergence Zone, and on August 11, the system developed into Tropical Depression Eight-E about 730 miles (1,170 km) southwest of Acapulco. On becoming a tropical cyclone, the depression maintained an area of concentrated deep convection near the center. The National Hurricane Center initially predicted that the depression would slowly intensify and reach winds of 70 mph (110 km/h) within 72 hours. For much of the rest of the storm's duration, the National Hurricane Center underestimated the intensity of the cyclone.

The depression tracked steadily northwestward, caused by its location along the western periphery of a subtropical ridge. It would retain that direction for most of its remaining duration. Late on August 11, it intensified into Tropical Storm Georgette, and two days later it attained hurricane status after developing a 40-mile (64 km) eye about 615 miles (990 km) south-southwest of Cabo San Lucas. The eye became increasingly distinct while banding features became very well organized. Georgette attained peak winds of 115 mph (185 km/h) while centered 690 miles (1,110 km) west-southwest of the southern tip of Baja California. The hurricane soon moved over cooler water, and began to weaken as convection warmed and decreased. On August 16, it degenerated into a tropical storm, and Georgette dissipated on August 17 without ever affecting land.

=== Tropical Depression One-C ===
- Tropical depression (SSHWS)
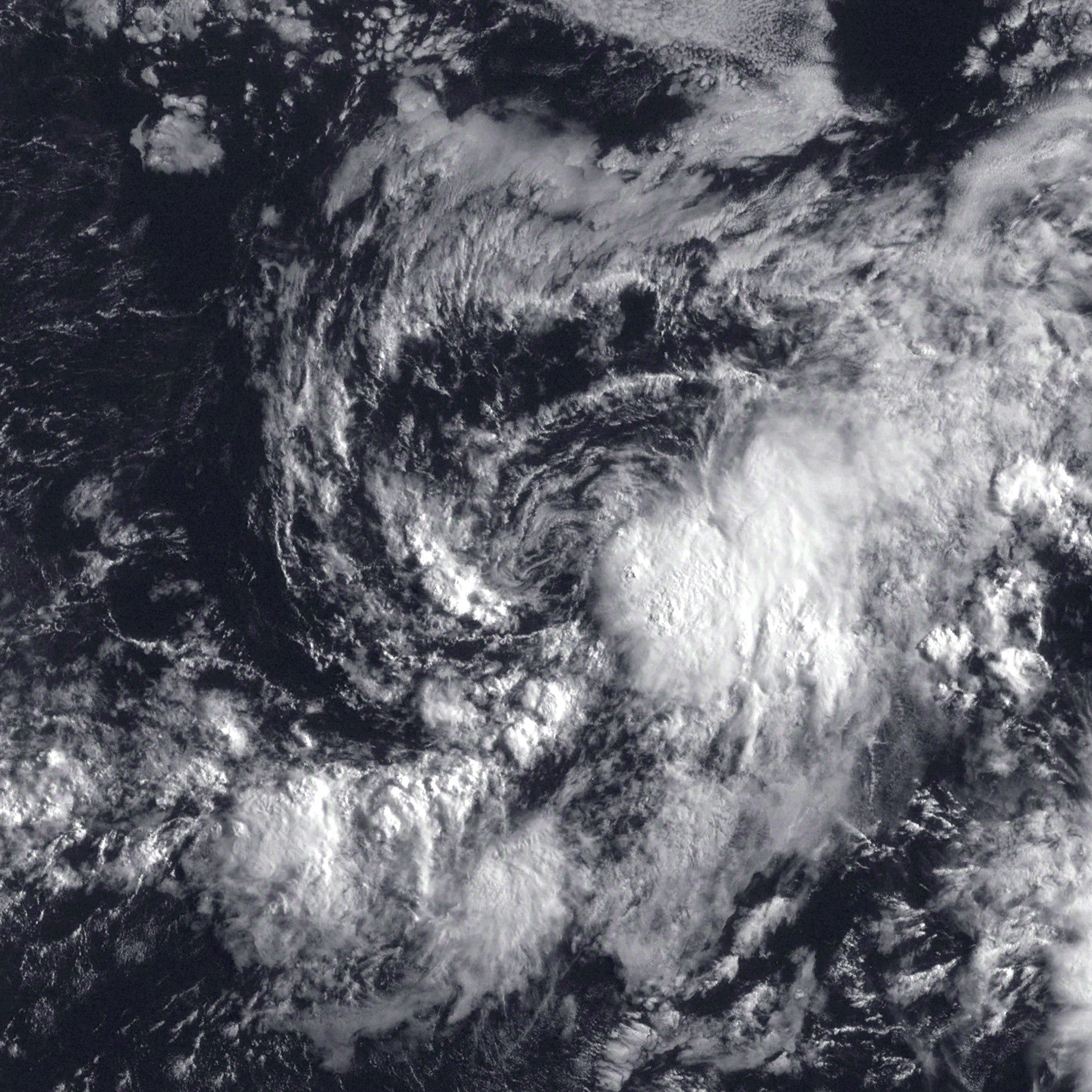
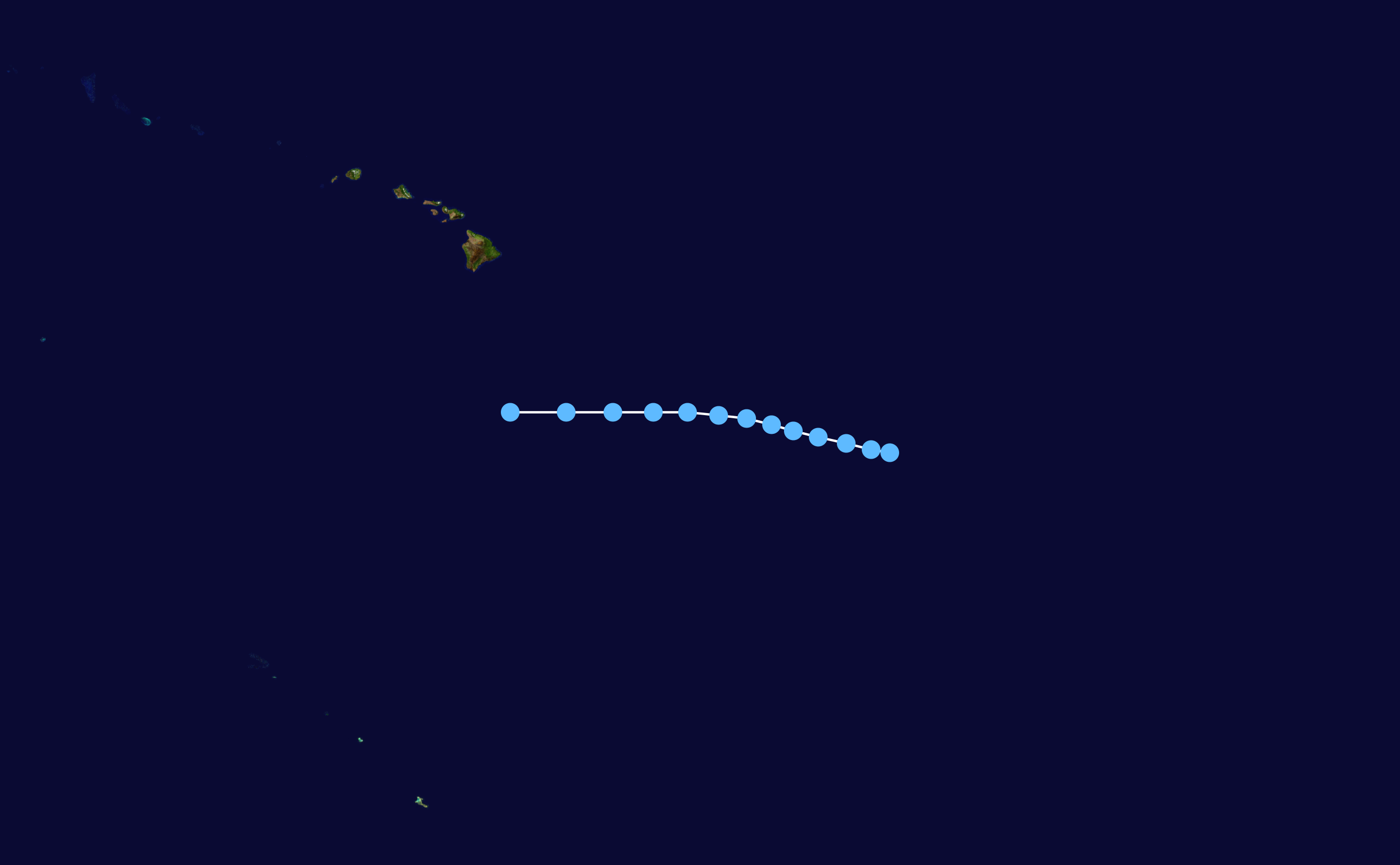
- Duration: August 16 – August 18
- Peak intensity: 35 mph (55 km/h) (1-min); 1010 mbar (hPa)

An area of convection developed in association with a northward bulge of the near-equatorial convergence zone. It tracked west-northwestward under the influence of a ridge to its north, and organized into Tropical Depression One-C on August 16, about 1,000 miles (1,600 km) southeast of the Hawaiian Islands. The depression failed to organize significantly as it turned westward. High wind shear from an upper-level trough continually weakened the system, and on August 18, the Central Pacific Hurricane Center issued the final advisory on the tropical depression about 365 miles (587 km) south of Hilo on the island of Hawaii.

=== Hurricane Howard ===
- Category 4 hurricane (SSHWS)
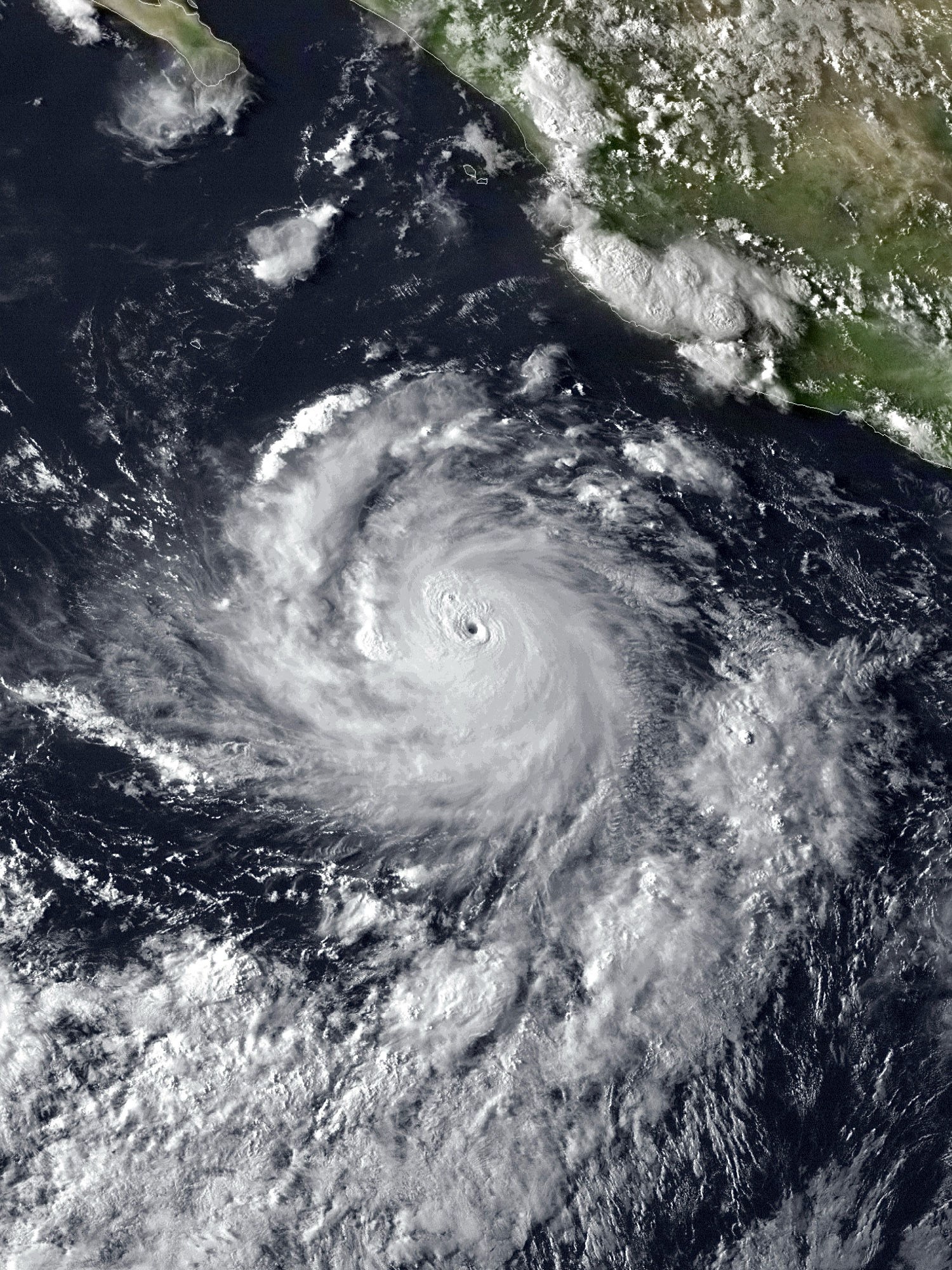
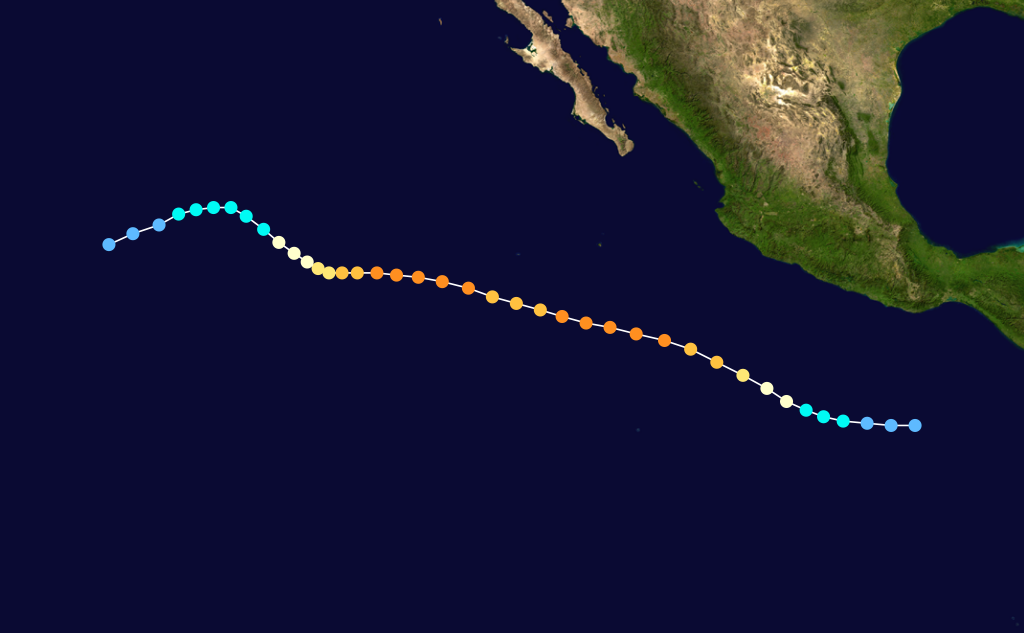
- Duration: August 20 – August 30
- Peak intensity: 150 mph (240 km/h) (1-min); 932 mbar (hPa)

A tropical wave moved off the coast of Africa on August 7. As it moved across the Atlantic Ocean, it failed to organize. On reaching the eastern Pacific Ocean on August 17, however, an area of convection developed along the wave axis. Dvorak classifications began the next day, and a broad center of circulation gradually formed. Convection was intermittent at first, though it gradually organized and persisted near the center, and on August 20, the disturbance developed into Tropical Depression Nine-E about 345 miles (555 km) south of Puerto Angel, Mexico. It tracked generally west-northwestward, developing more pronounced banding features, and on August 21, the depression intensified into Tropical Storm Howard. The center of Howard became embedded within the deep convection, and the storm quickly strengthened to attain hurricane status late on the 21st. An eye developed as outflow organized further, and Howard began to rapidly intensify to reach peak winds of 150 mph (240 km/h) about 600 miles (970 km) south-southeast of the southern tip of Baja California. At the time of its peak intensity, the eye was small and located within a very cold central dense overcast.

Shortly after peaking in intensity, the eye of Hurricane Howard gradually became larger, resulting in a slight weakening trend. After weakening to winds of 125 mph (201 km/h), the eye reached a diameter of about 30 miles (48 km), and the structure of the hurricane transitioned into that of an annular hurricane, similar to that of Darby earlier in the season. Howard strengthened again into a Category 4 hurricane on August 25 before weakening slightly the following day. The hurricane retained annular characteristics for about 48 hours before moving over cooler water. On August 28, it weakened to a tropical storm, and early on August 30, Howard was considered to have dissipated. A small, low-level swirl of clouds devoid of convection persisted for a few days before dissipating.

=== Hurricane Isis ===
- Category 1 hurricane (SSHWS)
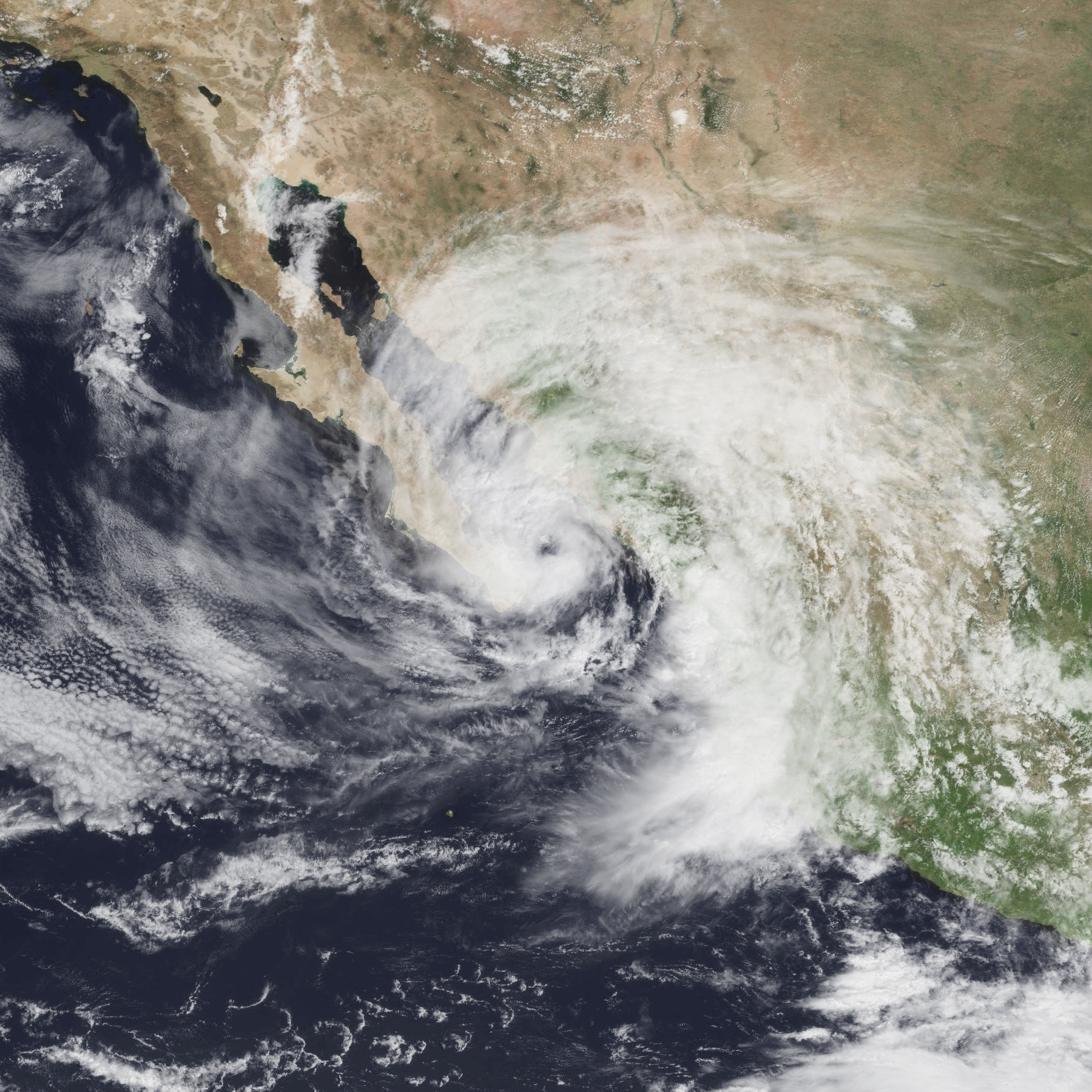
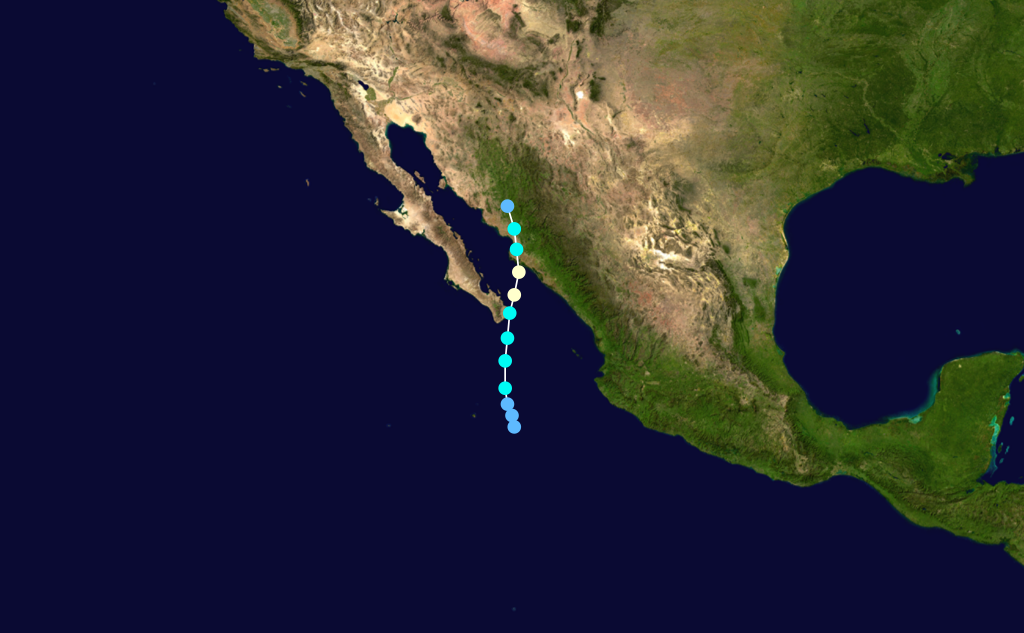
- Duration: September 1 – September 3
- Peak intensity: 75 mph (120 km/h) (1-min); 988 mbar (hPa)

Isis developed on September 1 out of the interaction between a tropical wave and a large, low-level circulation to the southwest of Mexico. It moved northward, striking the extreme southeastern portion of the Baja California Peninsula before attaining hurricane status in the Gulf of California. Isis made landfall at Topolobampo in the state of Sinaloa on September 3 and quickly lost its low-level circulation. The remnants persisted for several days before dissipating in the US state of Idaho.

In Mexico, Isis destroyed more than 700 houses and killed 14 people, primarily due to heavy rainfall of more than 20 inches (510 mm) in southern Baja California Sur. The rainfall caused widespread damage to roads and railways, stranding thousands of people. Moisture from the remnants of Isis extended into the southwestern United States, resulting in light rainfall, dozens of traffic accidents, and power outages for thousands of residents in San Diego County.

=== Tropical Storm Javier ===
- Tropical storm (SSHWS)
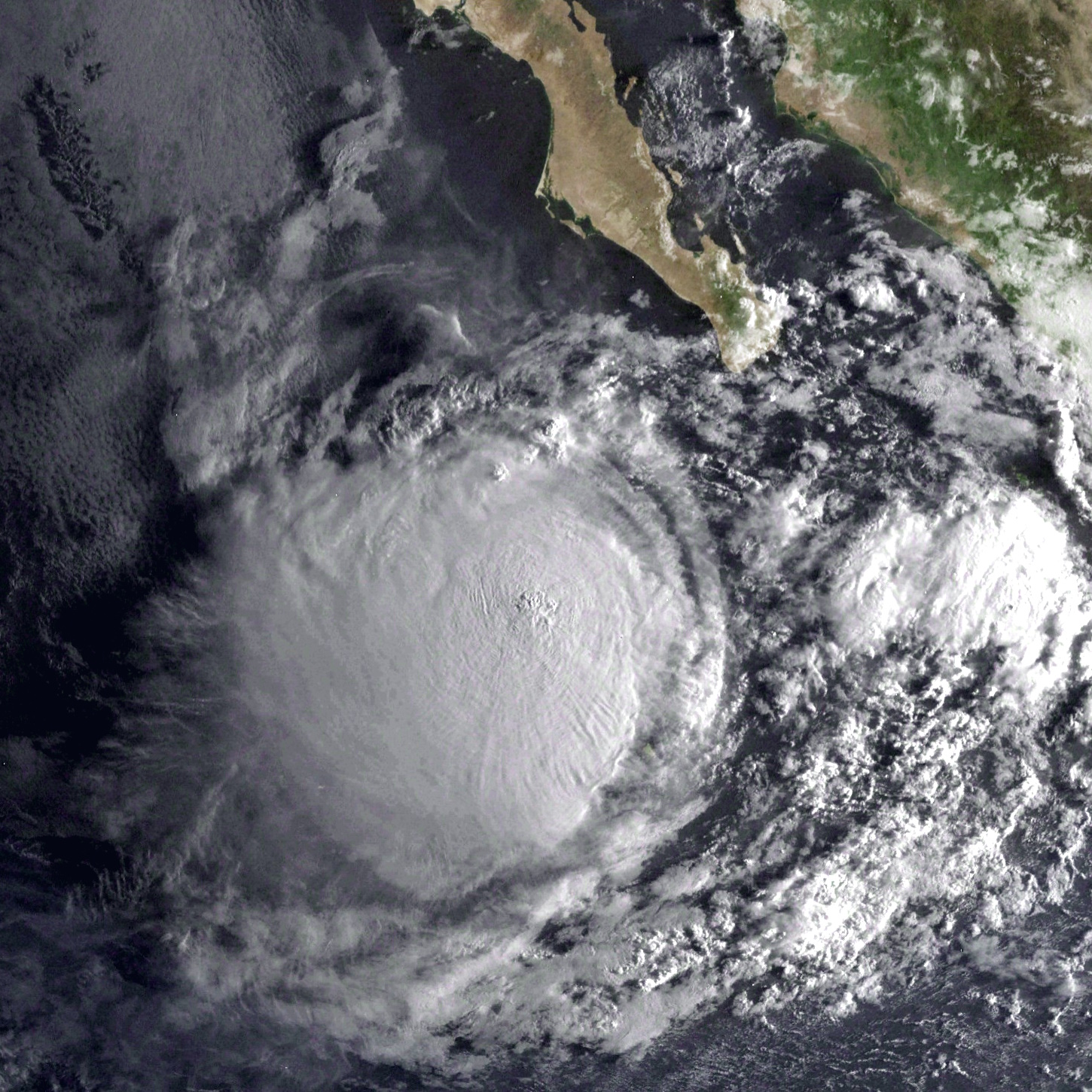
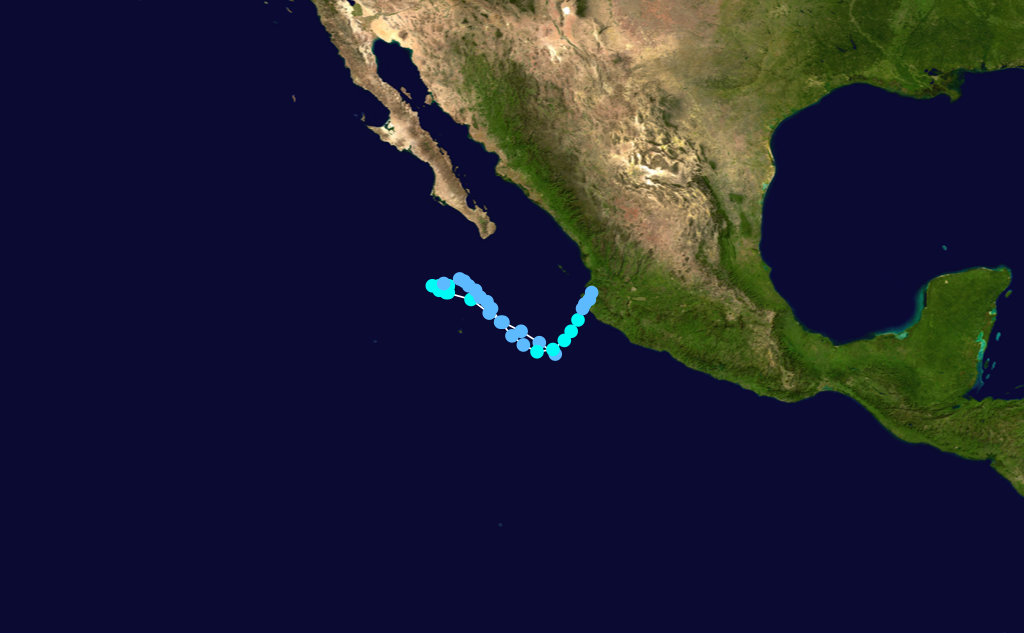
- Duration: September 6 – September 14
- Peak intensity: 60 mph (95 km/h) (1-min); 995 mbar (hPa)

Javier is believed to have originated from a tropical wave that moved off the coast of Africa on August 22. A convective disturbance along the northern portion of the wave developed into Atlantic Hurricane Danielle on August 24, while the southern portion of the wave axis continued westward. The wave remained inactive and difficult to track as it crossed the Atlantic. On September 3, an area of convection began to develop near Acapulco, at the same time and location where the wave would have been based on extrapolation. The disturbance became better defined on September 5 as it tracked west-northwestward, and on September 6 the convection became sufficiently organized and persistent for the National Hurricane Center to classify it as Tropical Depression Eleven-E, while it was located about 200 miles (320 km) southwest of Manzanillo, Mexico.

Easterly wind shear initially dislocated the circulation center to the eastern edge of the convection. The subtropical ridge to its north resulted in a general west-northwest motion, and the depression slowly intensified into Tropical Storm Javier late on September 7. Banding features in the system did not organize significantly, and on September 8, Javier attained a peak intensity of 60 mph (97 km/h), which coincided with a sharp increase in convection over the center. Steering currents soon weakened, and the storm turned to the east while convection quickly decreased. By September 9, the center was exposed from the diminishing deep convection, and that night it degenerated into a tropical depression. On September 11, the National Hurricane Center issued its final advisory on Javier, though later analysis indicates that it remained a tropical cyclone as it turned southeastward. At times, it became difficult to distinguish Javier from the broader area of disturbed weather that persisted over the tropical eastern Pacific, though a brief increase in convection and a ship report of winds exceeding 40 mph (64 km/h) indicate that Javier strengthened again into a tropical storm late on September 12. It turned to the northeast, and reached winds of 50 mph (80 km/h) before weakening due to waning convection. Javier made landfall about 35 miles (56 km) east-southeast of Cabo Corrientes, Jalisco early on September 14, and dissipated within 12 hours of moving ashore.

The National Hurricane Center advised small craft along coastal areas of Mexico to monitor the progress of the storm. Javier produced moderate rainfall along coastal regions of Mexico, including a 24-hour peak of 7.36 inches (187 mm) in Colima, 6.69 inches (170 mm) in Michoacán, and 3.34 inches (85 mm) in Jalisco. Puerto Vallarta reported the highest total rainfall, at 17.33 inches (440 mm).

=== Tropical Depression Twelve-E ===
- Tropical depression (SSHWS)
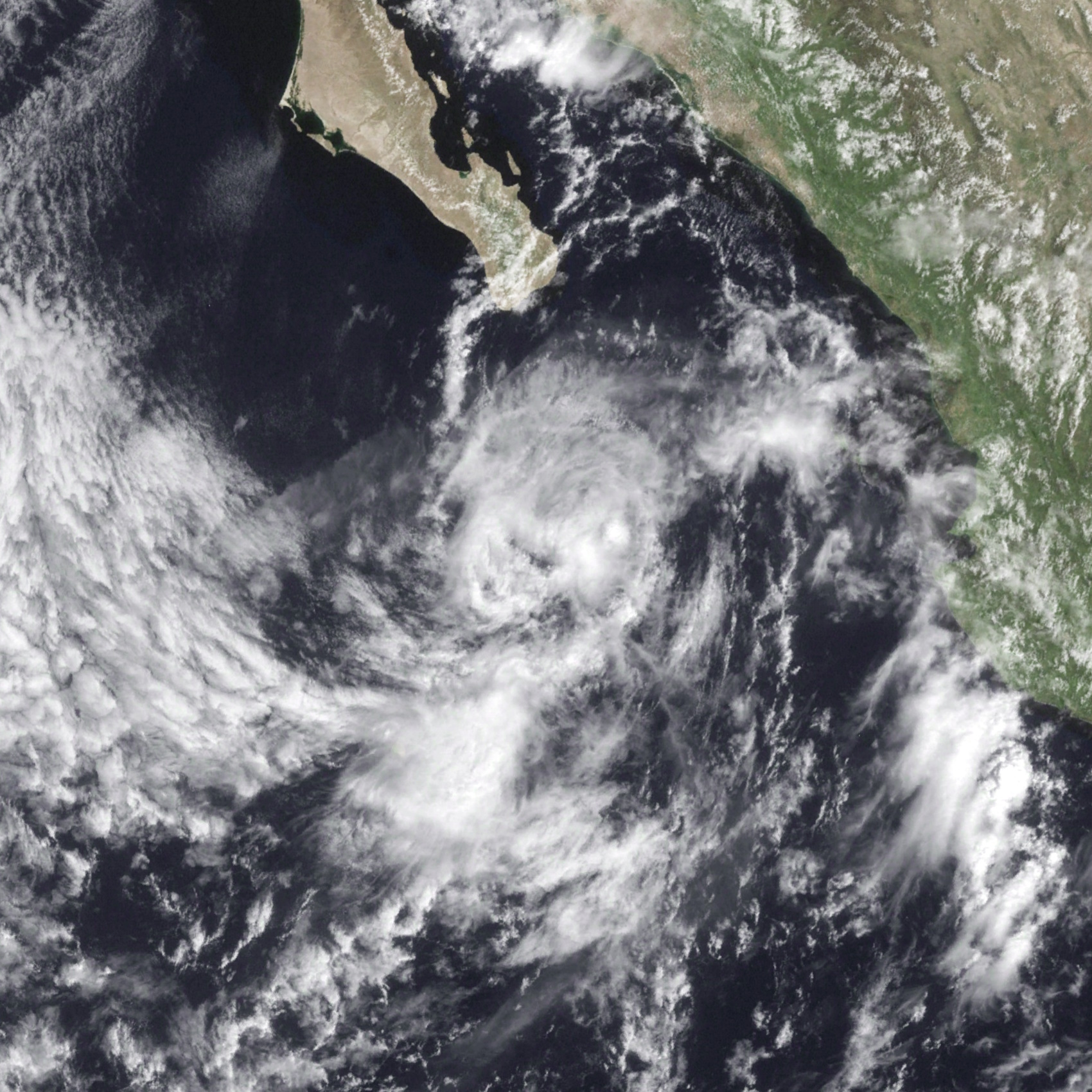
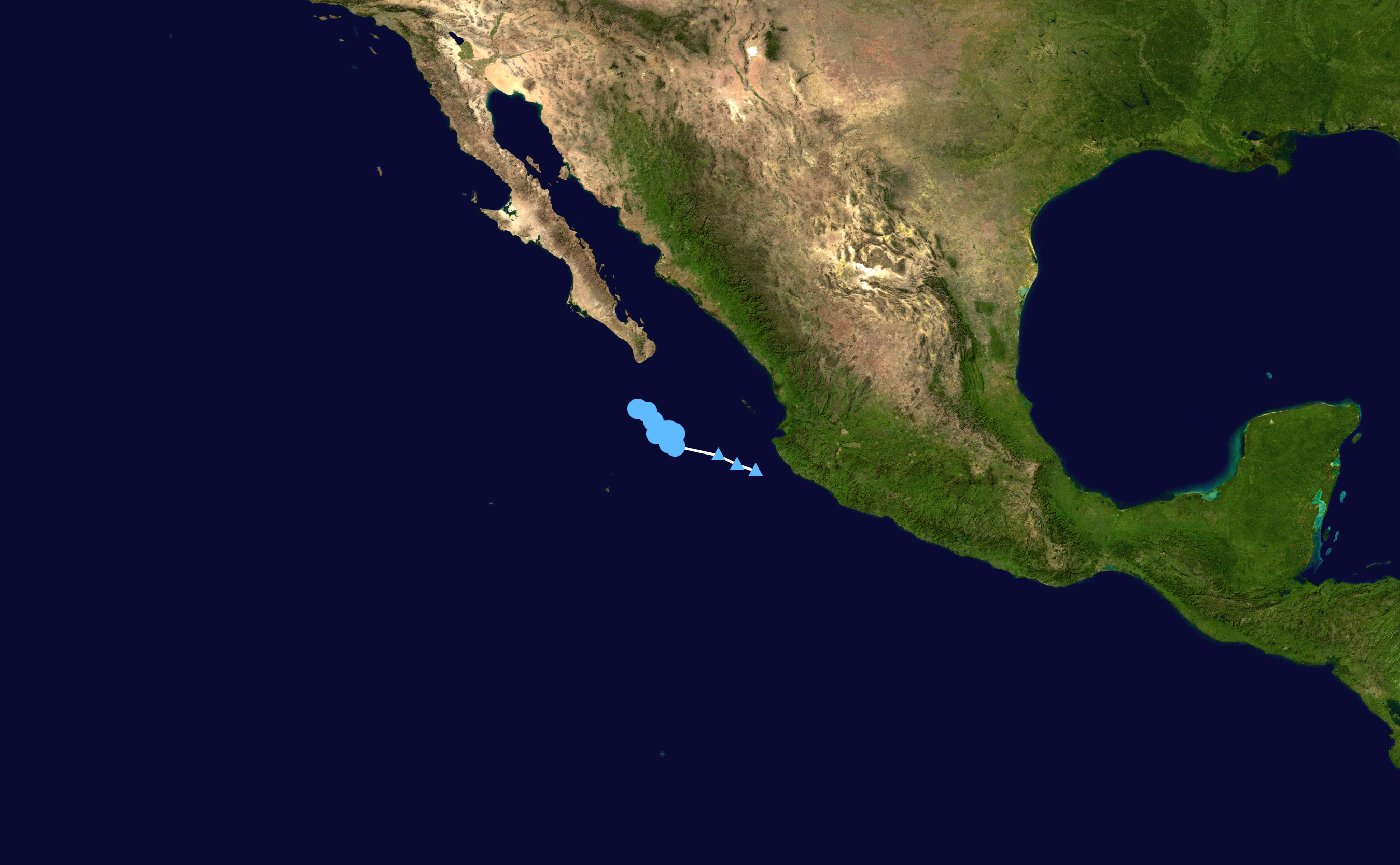
- Duration: October 1 – October 3
- Peak intensity: 35 mph (55 km/h) (1-min); 1003 mbar (hPa)

A tropical disturbance developed persistent convection in association with a low-level circulation, and organized into Tropical Depression Twelve-E late on October 1 about 350 miles (560 km) west-northwest of Manzanillo, Mexico. Within an environment of weak steering currents, the depression was initially forecast to track slowly west-northwestward and reach winds of 60 mph (97 km/h), but instead it drifted eastward before turning slowly to the west. The depression failed to organize and gradually worsened in appearance. Early on October 2, two ships reported southwest winds much further to the north, with the National Hurricane Center indicating that either the center was exceedingly small, that no center existed at the time, or that the center was located far to the north of the thunderstorm activity. Operationally, the center was relocated further to the north, then relocated about 115 miles (185 km) to the south six hours later based on visible satellite images, then again relocated to the north, coinciding with officials issuing the last advisory on the system. By early October 3, the depression possessed only intermittent convection, and later that day it dissipated to the southwest of the Baja California peninsula. Heavy rains from its eastern periphery fell across southwest Mexico, with a maximum total of 6.34 inches (161 mm) at Las Gaviotas/Compostela.

=== Hurricane Kay ===
- Category 1 hurricane (SSHWS)
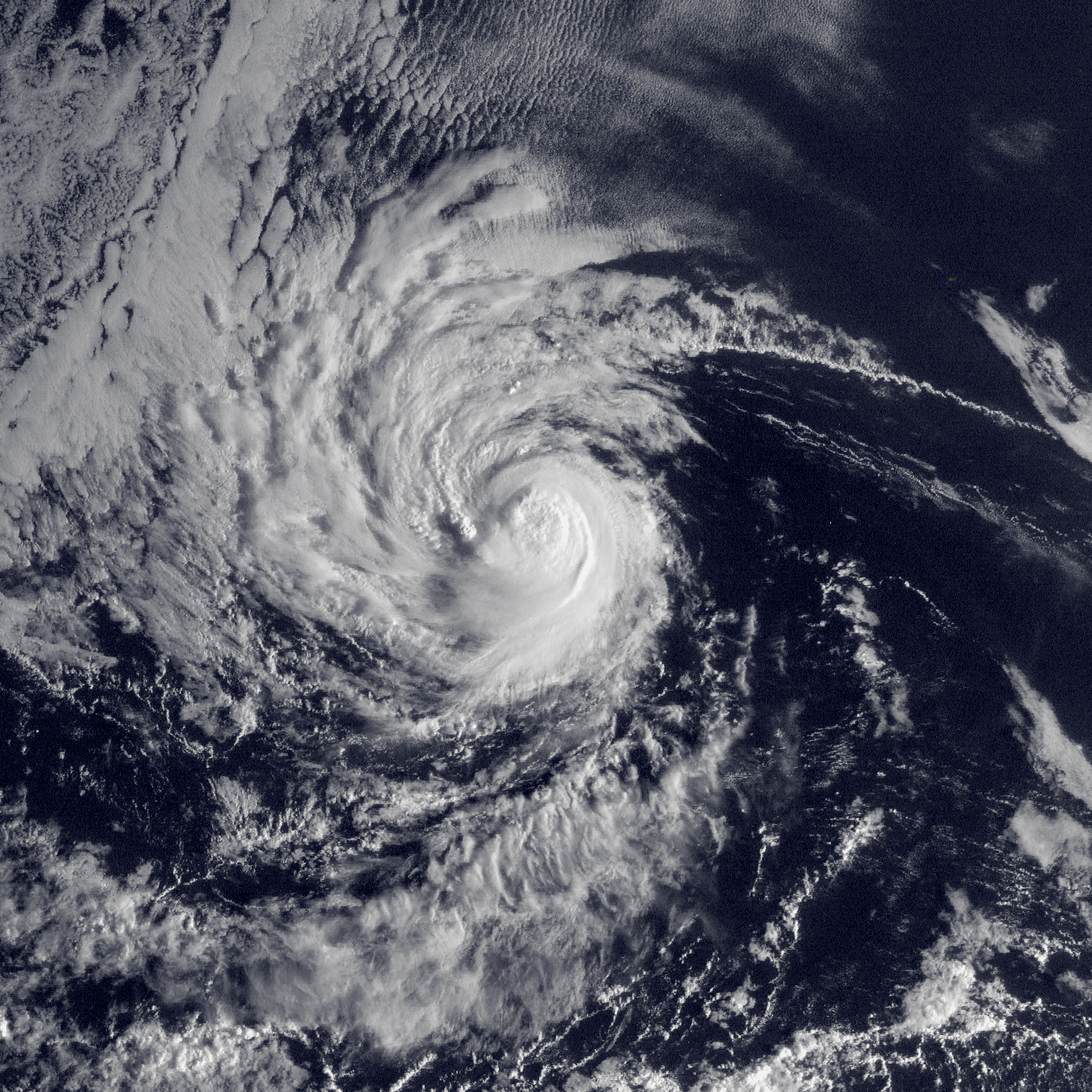
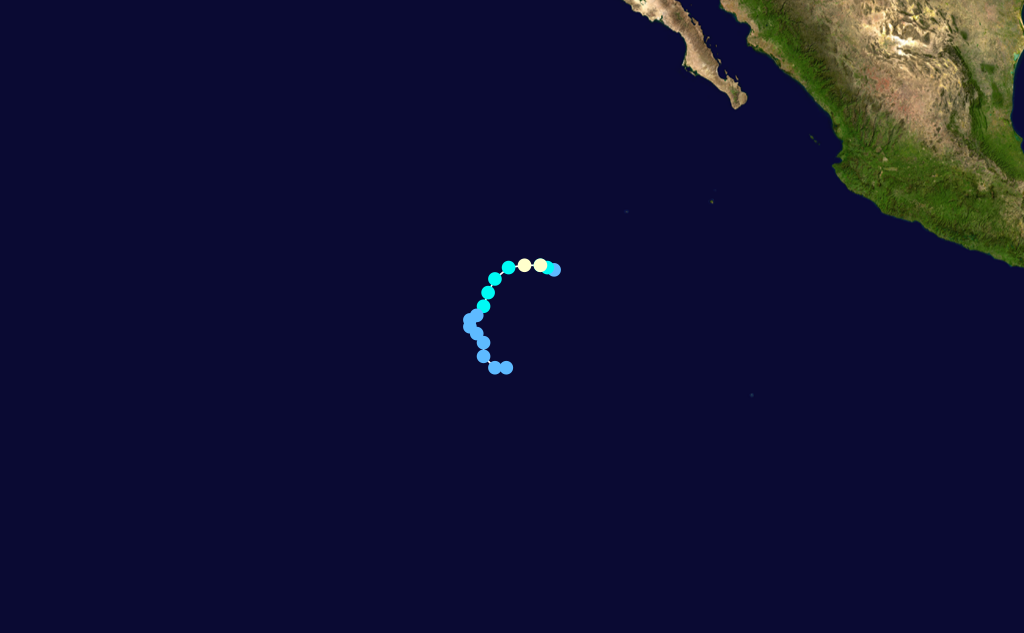
- Duration: October 13 – October 17
- Peak intensity: 75 mph (120 km/h) (1-min); 987 mbar (hPa)

A small, low-level circulation separated itself from the Intertropical Convergence Zone on October 10, several hundred miles southwest of Baja California. The circulation was well defined, though its convection was initially minimal and disorganized. On October 12, the convection increased greatly, and the system was sufficiently organized to be classified Tropical Depression Thirteen-E early on October 13, about 715 miles (1,151 km) southwest of Cabo San Lucas. Dvorak classifications also indicated winds of about 35 mph (56 km/h). Operationally, the depression was forecast to intensify to reach peak winds of 45 mph (72 km/h) while tracking steadily west-northwestward.

The storm center was at first ill-defined, and post-season analysis estimates that it intensified into Tropical Storm Kay about 6 hours after developing. After becoming a tropical storm, Kay rapidly organized as it tracked generally westward. A pinhole eye developed in the center of the convection, and Kay attained hurricane status late on October 13, about 18 hours after developing. After remaining a hurricane for about 12 hours, the eye disappeared and the convection weakened, and early on October 14 Kay degenerated into a tropical storm. Within an environment of weak steering currents, the storm turned to the southwest, then to the south, after weakening to a tropical depression on October 15. Convection sporadically redeveloped, but failed to persist. Kay turned to the southeast and later to the east, and the system dissipated on October 17, about 330 miles (530 km) south-southwest of its origin.

=== Hurricane Lester ===
- Category 3 hurricane (SSHWS)
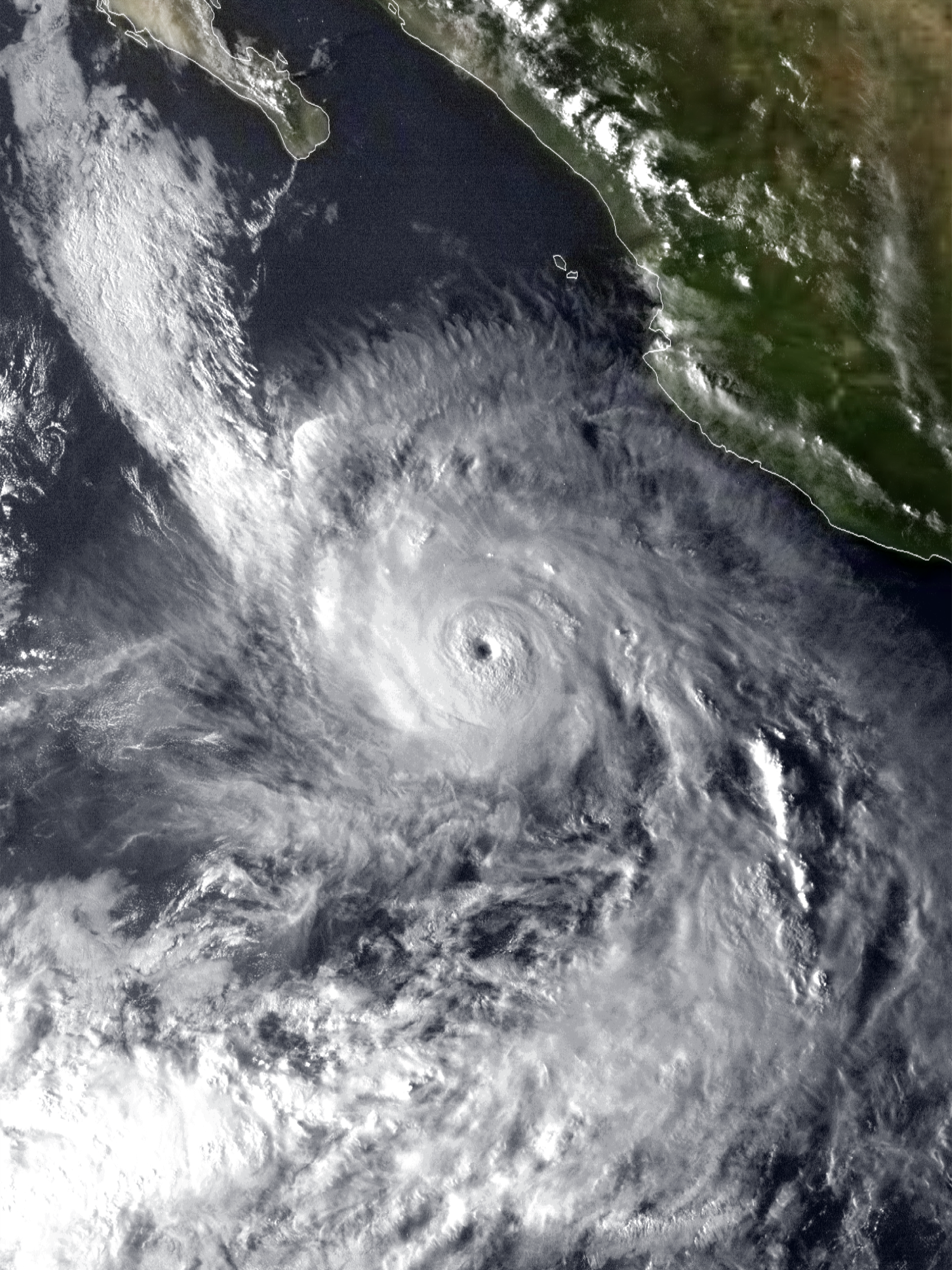
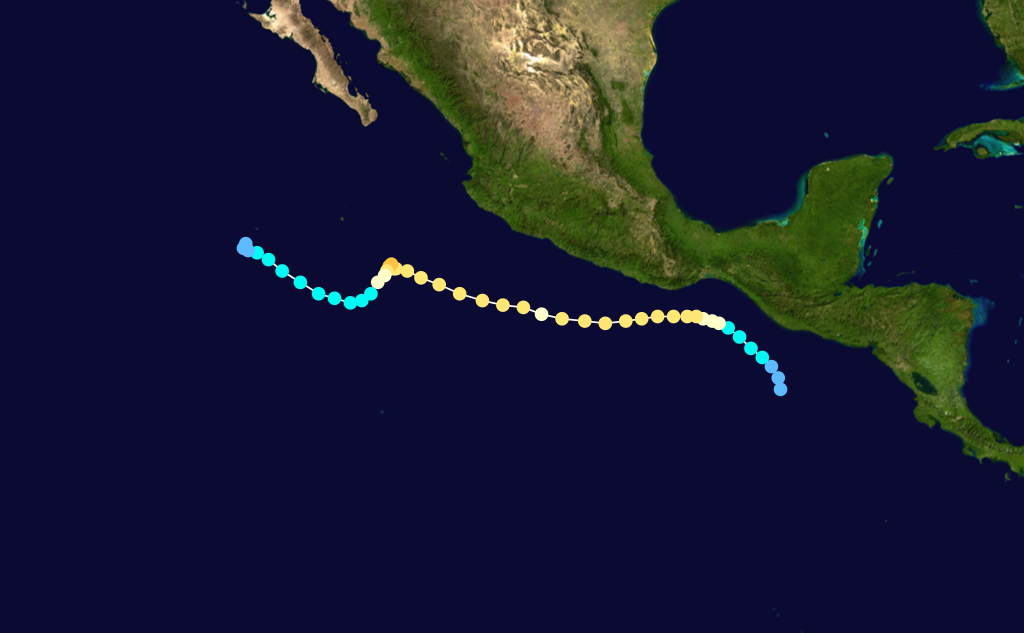
- Duration: October 15 – October 26
- Peak intensity: 115 mph (185 km/h) (1-min); 965 mbar (hPa)

A tropical wave moved off the coast of Africa on September 29, which spawned Atlantic Hurricane Lisa. The wave axis continued westward, crossing Central America into the eastern Pacific. A low-level circulation developed on October 13 about 170 miles (270 km) south of the border between El Salvador and Guatemala. The system drifted northwestward, and as convection increased around the center a banding featured began to develop. At 00:00 UTC on October 15, the National Hurricane Center designated it as Tropical Depression Fourteen-E. A large system with good outflow, the depression was in a favorable area, including warm water and low vertical wind shear. Thunderstorm activity organized close to the center, and by 18:00 UTC on October 15, the depression was upgraded to Tropical Storm Lester. Moving generally westward, Lester attained hurricane intensity on October 16, as confirmed by the Hurricane Hunters. The first signs of an eye began to appear embedded within a ring of deep convection by early on October 17. Lester became nearly stationary due to a shortwave passing north of the system. The hurricane made its closest approach to land on October 18, about 70 miles (110 km) south of Puerto Angel, Oaxaca. Later that day, Lester weakened into a minimal hurricane, and the intensity fluctuated due to wind shear from a nearby upper-level low. On October 20, the hurricane regained organization and again intensified. Lester reached a peak intensity of 115 mph (185 km/h) on October 22, about 355 miles (571 km) southwest of Manzanillo, Colima. Coinciding with its peak intensity, a shortwave trough caused Lester to stall before turning to the southwest and weakening. Early on October 23, Lester rapidly lost deep convection, and it fell to tropical storm status. By October 24, the low-level center of circulation became exposed from the cloud structure, and at 0000 UTC on October 26, Lester had degenerated into a tropical depression, about 500 miles (800 km) southwest of the southern tip of Baja California Peninsula, shortly before dissipating.

In anticipation of the storm, the government of Mexico issued a hurricane warning from Puerto Arista to Punta Maldonaldo and later from Salina Cruz to Acapulco. A tropical storm warning was also issued from Sipacate, Guatemala to Puerto Arista, Mexico. The threat of the hurricane prompted officials to order the evacuation of 3,000 people along the southern coast of Mexico to 500 emergency shelters. The storm dropped heavy rainfall across southwestern Guatemala. Up to 9 inches (230 mm) of rainfall was reported in localized areas along the Pacific coast of the country. Moisture brought around the northeast periphery of the Sierra Madre Occidental led to a narrow band of heavy rainfall along the upslope side of the mountain range, with a local precipitation maximum exceeding 14 inches (360 mm). It is reported that tropical-storm-force winds occurred along coastal areas of southern Mexico. The rainfall destroyed some houses and killed numerous livestock, and triggered a mudslide which killed two children In Honduras, rainfall from Lester destroyed a bridge which affected transportation for about 1,000 people. Heavy rainfall was reported in Chiapas, causing moderate river flooding.

=== Hurricane Madeline ===
- Category 1 hurricane (SSHWS)
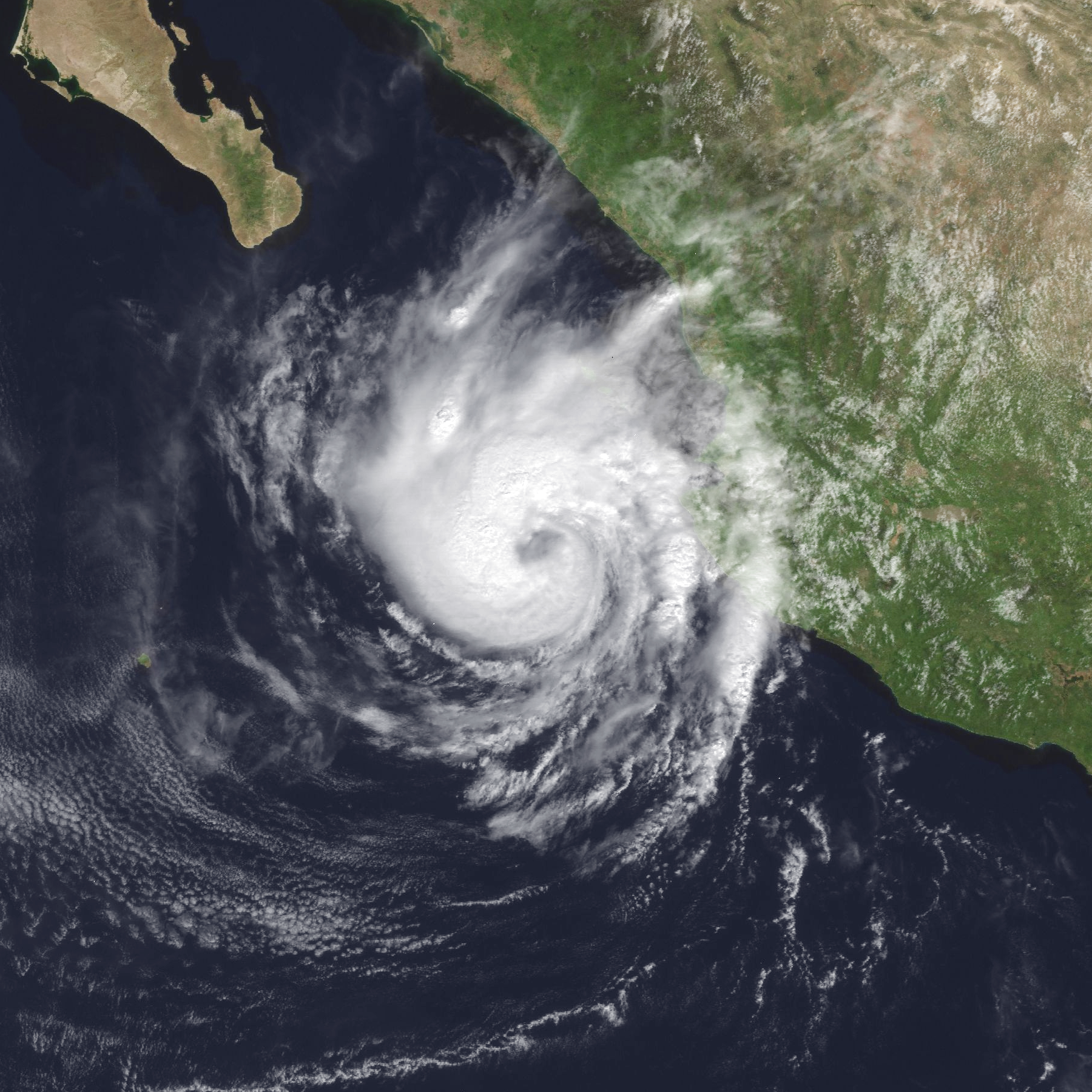
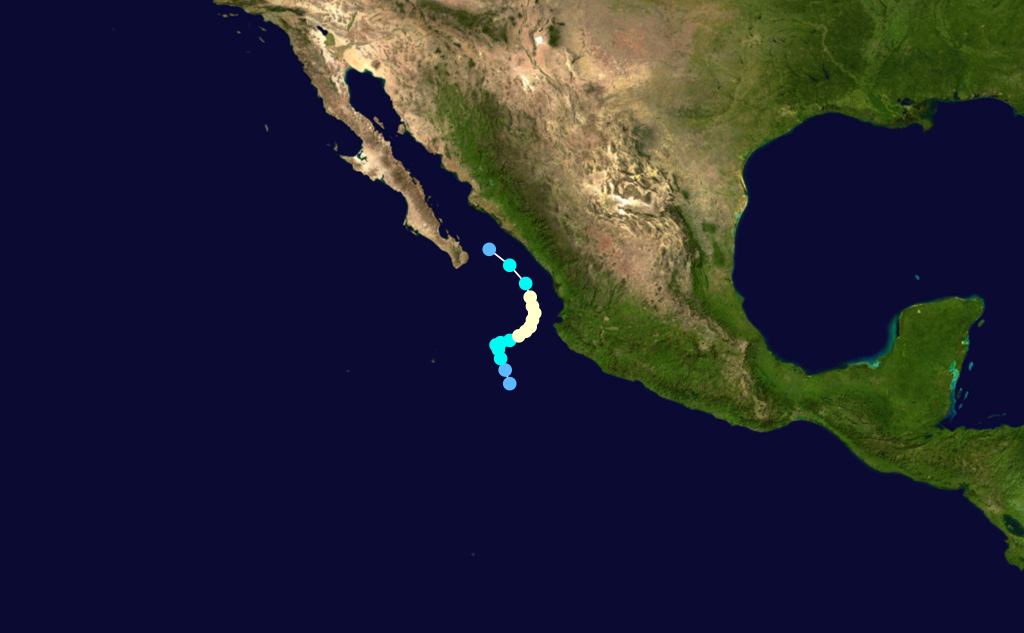
- Duration: October 16 – October 20
- Peak intensity: 85 mph (140 km/h) (1-min); 979 mbar (hPa)

A tropical wave moved off the coast of Africa on September 25, and remained disorganized while crossing the Atlantic Ocean before crossing Central America into the Pacific Ocean. It continued westward, and on October 15 began to steadily organize until developing into Tropical Depression Fifteen-E on October 16, about 230 miles (370 km) west-southwest of Manzanillo, Mexico. At the western end of a mid-level ridge, the depression tracked north-northwestward. 12 hours after first developing, the depression intensified into Tropical Storm Madeline. Banding features gradually improved in organization, and late on October 17, Madeline attained hurricane status. On October 18, Madeline attained peak winds of 85 mph (137 km/h) about 95 miles (153 km) southwest of San Blas, Nayarit. Late on October 19, the hurricane degenerated into a tropical storm, and early on October 20, Madeline dissipated in the southern portion of the Gulf of California.

Some of the rainbands from Madeline moved over portions of southwest Mexico, with close to 9 inches (230 mm) falling at Cabo Corrientes. No damage or casualties were reported as a result of the storm in Mexico. Moisture from Madeline contributed to heavy rainfall across southeastern Texas, reaching over 22 inches (560 mm) in some locations. Thirty-one people died due to the flooding, and damage totaled $750 million (1998 USD).

== Storm names ==
The following list of names was used for named storms that formed in the North Pacific Ocean east of 140°W during 1998. This is the same list used in the 1992 season. No names were retired from the list following the season, and it was used again for the 2004 season.

- Agatha
- Blas
- Celia
- Darby *
- Estelle *
- Frank
- Georgette
- Howard
- Isis
- Javier
- Kay
- Lester
- Madeline
- Newton (unused)
- Orlene (unused)
- Paine (unused)
- Roslyn (unused)
- Seymour (unused)
- Tina (unused)
- Virgil (unused)
- Winifred (unused)
- Xavier (unused)
- Yolanda (unused)
- Zeke (unused)

For storms that form in the North Pacific between 140°W to the International Date Line, the names come from a series of four rotating lists. Names are used one after the other without regard to year, and when the bottom of one list is reached, the next named storm receives the name at the top of the next list. No named storms formed in the central North Pacific in 1998. Named storms in the table above that crossed into the area during the year are noted (*).

== Season effects ==
This is a table of all of the tropical cyclones that formed in the 1998 Pacific hurricane season. It includes their name, duration (within the basin), peak classification and intensities, areas affected, damage, and death totals. Deaths in parentheses are additional and indirect (an example of an indirect death would be a traffic accident), but were still related to that storm. Damage and deaths include totals while the storm was extratropical, a wave, or a low, and all of the damage figures are in 1998 USD.

Saffir–Simpson scale
| TD | TS | C1 | C2 | C3 | C4 | C5 |

1998 Pacific tropical cyclone season statistics
| Storm name | Dates active | Storm category at peak intensity | Max 1-min wind mph (km/h) | Min. press. (mbar) | Areas affected | Damage (US$) | Deaths | Ref(s). |
|---|---|---|---|---|---|---|---|---|
| Agatha | June 11–16 | Tropical storm | 65 (100) | 993 | None | None | None | |
| Two-E | June 19–22 | Tropical depression | 35 (55) | 1003 | None | None | None | |
| Blas | June 22–30 | Category 4 hurricane | 140 (220) | 943 | Southwestern Mexico, Revillagigedo Islands | Minimal | 4 | |
| Celia | July 17–21 | Tropical storm | 60 (95) | 997 | Baja California Peninsula, Revillagigedo Islands, California | Unknown | None | |
| Darby | July 23 – August 1 | Category 3 hurricane | 115 (185) | 958 | Hawaii | None | None | |
| Estelle | July 29 – August 8 | Category 4 hurricane | 130 (215) | 948 | None | None | None | |
| Frank | August 6–10 | Tropical storm | 45 (75) | 1001 | Baja California Peninsula, Southwestern United States, Arizona | None | 3 | |
| Georgette | August 11–17 | Category 3 hurricane | 115 (185) | 960 | None | None | None | |
| One-C | August 16–19 | Tropical depression | 35 (55) | 1010 | None | None | None | |
| Howard | August 20–30 | Category 4 hurricane | 150 (240) | 932 | None | None | None | |
| Isis | September 1–3 | Category 1 hurricane | 75 (120) | 988 | Revillagigedo Islands, Baja California Peninsula, Northwestern Mexico, Southwestern United States, Northwestern United States | $100 million | 14 | |
| Javier | September 6–14 | Tropical storm | 60 (95) | 995 | Revillagigedo Islands, Southwestern Mexico | Unknown | None | |
| Twelve-E | October 1–3 | Tropical depression | 35 (55) | 1003 | None | None | None | |
| Kay | October 13–17 | Category 1 hurricane | 75 (120) | 987 | None | None | None | |
| Lester | October 15–26 | Category 3 hurricane | 115 (185) | 965 | Southwestern Mexico | None | 2 | |
| Madeline | October 16–20 | Category 1 hurricane | 85 (140) | 979 | Southwestern Mexico, Baja California Peninsula, Texas | $750 million | 31 | |
Season aggregates
| 16 systems | June 11 – October 26 | | 150 (240) | 932 | | $850 million | 54 | |

== See also ==
- 1998 Atlantic hurricane season
- 1998 North Indian Ocean cyclone season
- 1998 Pacific typhoon season
- Australian region cyclone seasons: 1997–98, 1998–99
- South Pacific cyclone seasons: 1997–98, 1998–99
- South-West Indian Ocean cyclone seasons: 1997–98, 1998–99
- List of Pacific hurricanes
- Pacific hurricane season
