= Timeline of the 1998 Pacific hurricane season =

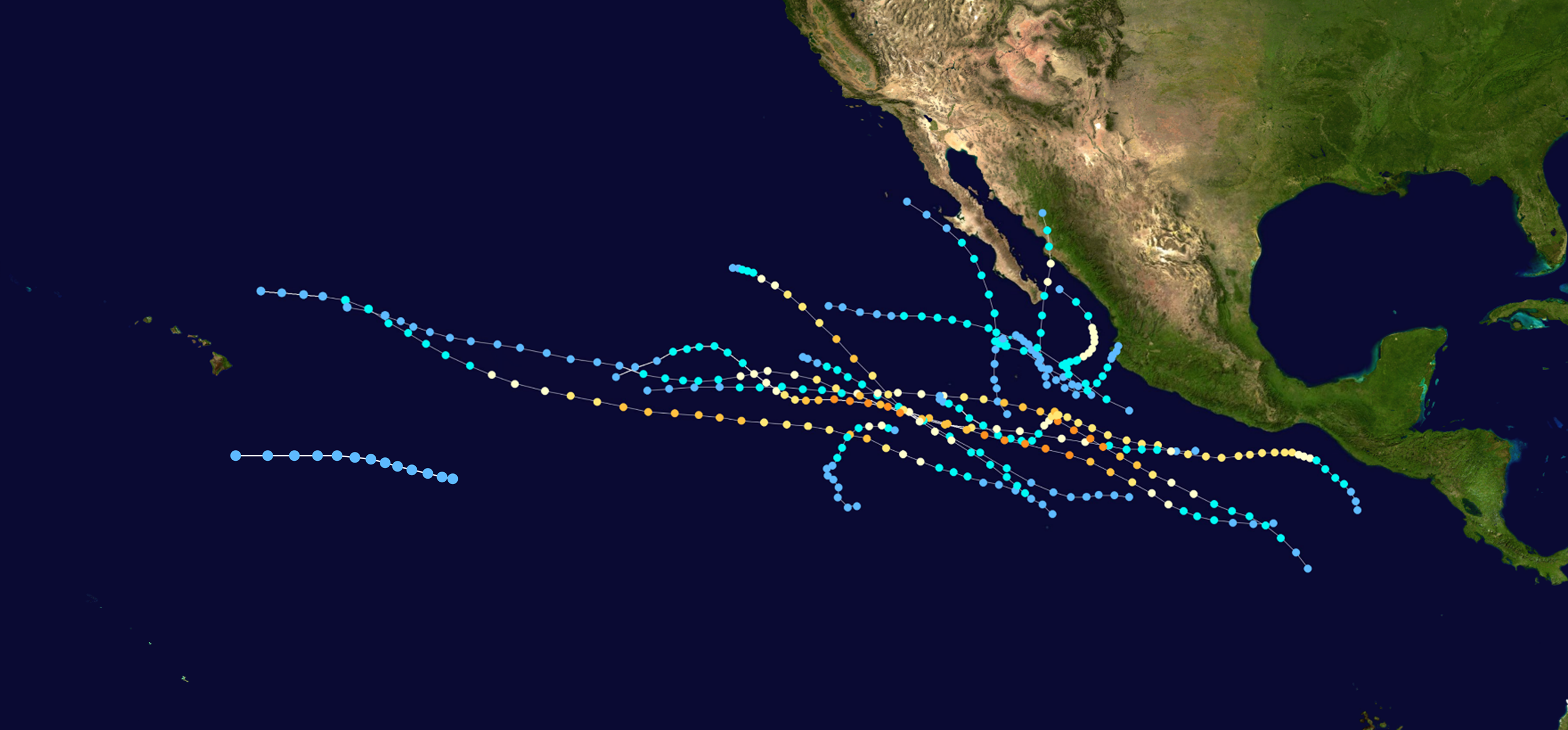
- Season summary map

Season boundaries
- First system formed: June 11, 1998
- Last system dissipated: October 26, 1998

Strongest system
- Name: Howard
- Maximum winds: 150 mph (240 km/h) (1-minute sustained)
- Lowest pressure: 932 mbar (hPa; 27.52 inHg)

Longest lasting system
- Name: Lester
- Duration: 11.75 days
Storm articles
- Hurricane Isis (1998)
- Hurricane Madeline (1998)

The 1998 Pacific hurricane season was the annual cycle of tropical cyclone formation over the Pacific Ocean north of the equator and east of the International Date Line. The season officially began on May 15 in the Eastern Pacific proper (east of 140°W) and June 1 in the Central Pacific (140°W to the International Date Line), and ended on November 30 in both areas. This is historically the period during which most tropical cyclogenesis occurs in these respective areas. The first system, Tropical Storm Agatha, formed on June 11. The final system to dissipate was Hurricane Lester, which did so on October 26. Hurricane Madeline formed shortly after Lester, but dissipated several days earlier.

The season generated a below-average number of thirteen named tropical storms. (Note: During the period from 1991 to 2020, an average Pacific hurricane season generated fifteen tropical storms, eight hurricanes, and four major hurricanes.) However, nine became hurricanes, which was near average. An above-average number of six further intensified into major hurricanes—Category 3 or higher on the five-level Saffir–Simpson scale, with maximum sustained winds of at least 111 mph (179 km/h). Additionally, three tropical depressions developed that did not attain tropical storm strength. Prevailing atmospheric currents steered the vast majority of storms out to sea; only two made landfall, which was below the contemporary average of three or four. Hurricane Isis struck Baja California Sur and Sinaloa as a tropical storm and a minimal hurricane, respectively, while Tropical Storm Javier came ashore in Jalisco as a tropical depression. Tropical Storm Frank and hurricanes Lester and Madeline passed close enough to Mexico to produce peripheral effects on land; the remnants of Madeline contributed to deadly and destructive flooding in Texas.

This timeline documents tropical cyclone formations, strengthening, weakening, landfalls, and dissipations during the season. It includes information that was not released during the season, meaning that data from post-storm reviews by the National Hurricane Center and the Central Pacific Hurricane Center has been included.

The time stamp for each event is first stated using Coordinated Universal Time (UTC), the 24-hour clock where 00:00 = midnight UTC. The NHC uses both UTC and the time zone where the center of the tropical cyclone was then located. Prior to 2015, two time zones were utilized in the Eastern Pacific basin: Pacific for the Eastern Pacific, and Hawaii−Aleutian for the Central Pacific. In this timeline, the respective area time is included in parentheses. Additionally, figures for maximum sustained winds and position estimates are rounded to the nearest 5 units (miles, or kilometers), following NHC practice. Direct wind observations are rounded to the nearest whole number. Atmospheric pressures are listed to the nearest millibar and nearest hundredth of an inch of mercury.

== Timeline of events ==
=== May ===
There was no tropical cyclone activity in May.

May 15

- The 1998 Eastern Pacific hurricane season officially begins.

=== June ===
June 1

- The 1998 Central Pacific hurricane season officially begins.

June 11

- 12:00 UTC (5:00 a.m. PDT) at 12.0°N 104.6°W – Tropical Depression One-E forms from a tropical wave well off the Pacific coast of Mexico.

June 13

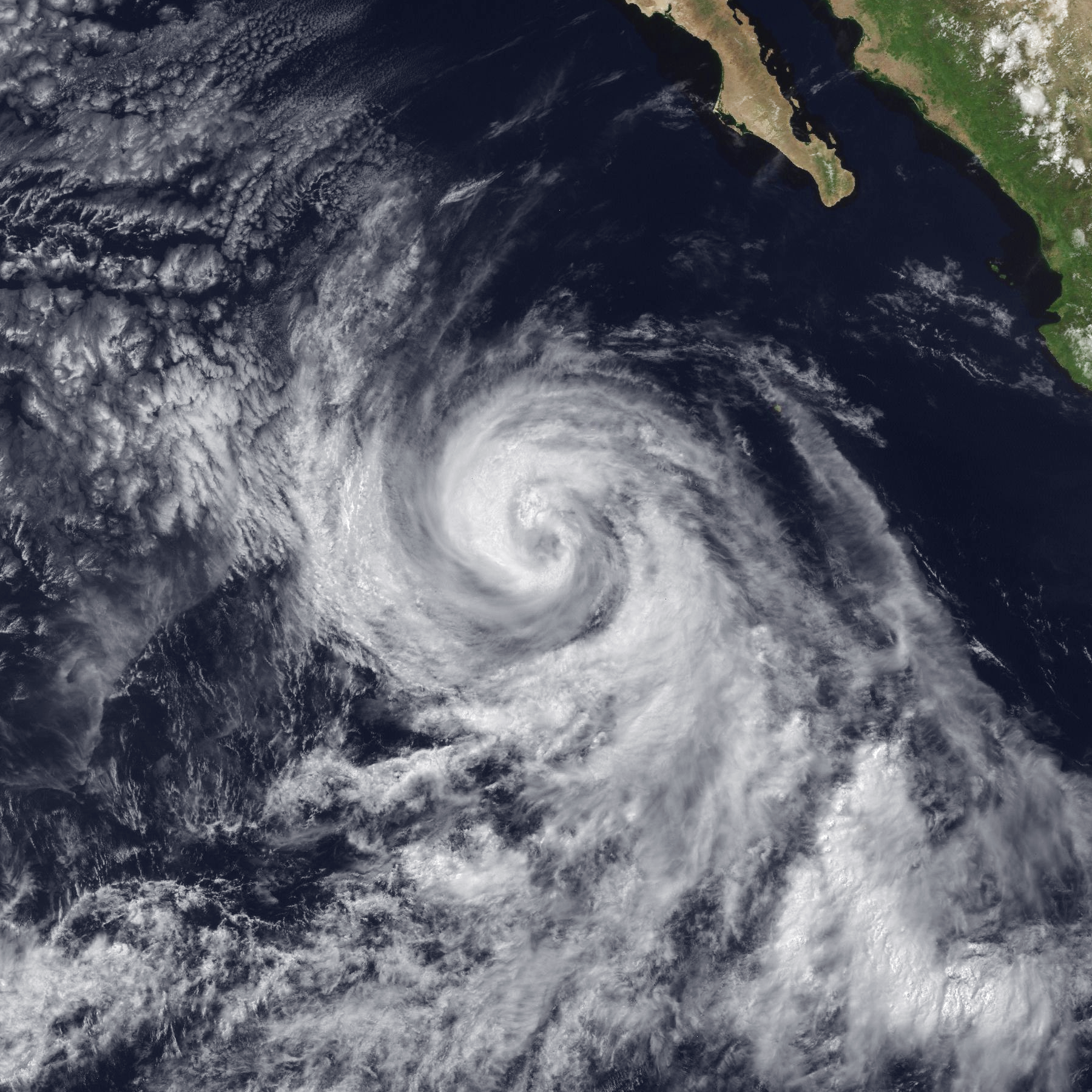
Tropical Storm Agatha near peak intensity late on June 13

- 06:00 UTC (11:00 p.m. PDT, June 12) at 13.6°N 111.5°W – Tropical Depression One-E strengthens into Tropical Storm Agatha about 650 mi (1,045 km) south of the southern tip of the Baja California peninsula.

June 14

- 00:00 UTC (5:00 p.m. PDT, June 13) at 16.3°N 116.2°W – Tropical Storm Agatha attains its peak intensity, with maximum sustained winds of 65 mph (100 km/h) and a minimum central pressure of 993 mbar (29.32 inHg), about 610 mi (980 km) southwest of the southern tip of the Baja California peninsula.

June 15

- 18:00 UTC (11:00 a.m. PDT) at 19.6°N 122.2°W – Tropical Storm Agatha weakens into a tropical depression about 815 mi (1,315 km) west-southwest of the southern tip of the Baja California peninsula.

June 16

- 18:00 UTC (11:00 a.m. PDT) at 19.9°N 123.0°W – Tropical Depression Agatha is last noted as a tropical cyclone about 865 mi (1,390 km) west-southwest of the southern tip of the Baja California peninsula, dissipating shortly thereafter.

June 19

- 18:00 UTC (11:00 a.m. PDT) at 15.2°N 104.5°W – Tropical Depression Two-E forms from an area of unsettled weather off the Pacific coast of Mexico.

June 21

- 00:00 UTC (5:00 p.m. PDT, June 20) at 17.8°N 109.9°W – Tropical Depression Two-E attains its peak intensity, with maximum sustained winds of 35 mph (55 km/h) and a minimum central pressure of 1003 mbar (29.62 inHg), about 100 mi (155 km) southeast of Socorro Island.

June 22

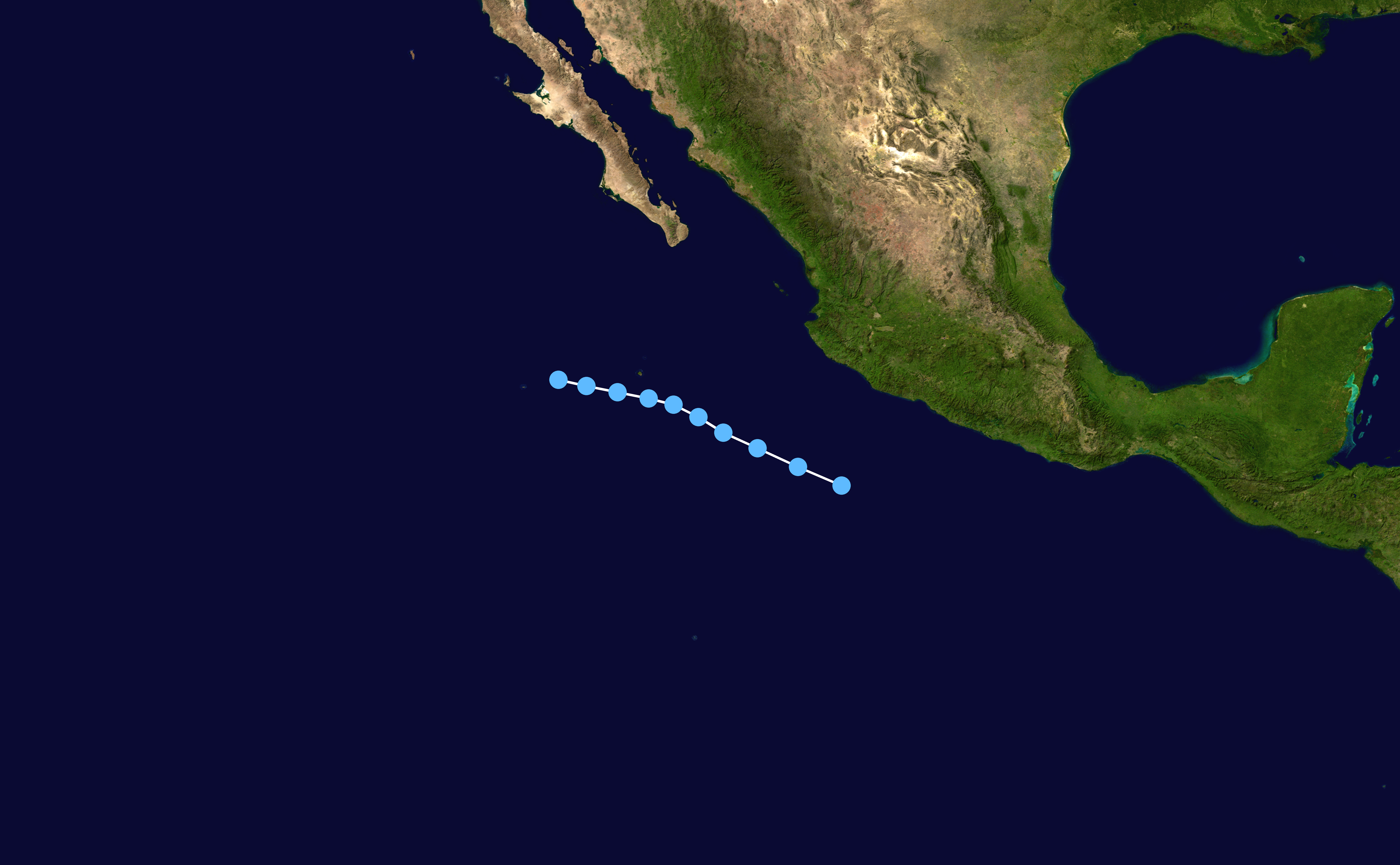
Storm path of Tropical Depression Two-E

- 00:00 UTC (5:00 p.m. PDT, June 21) at 18.6°N 113.6°W – Tropical Depression Two-E is last noted as a tropical cyclone about 175 mi (280 km) west of Socorro Island, dissipating shortly thereafter.
- 00:00 UTC (5:00 p.m. PDT, June 21) at 8.0°N 94.5°W – Tropical Depression Three-E forms from a tropical wave about 575 mi (925 km) south of the Gulf of Tehuantepec.
- 12:00 UTC (5:00 a.m. PDT) at 9.7°N 96.0°W – Tropical Depression Three-E strengthens into Tropical Storm Blas about 415 mi (665 km) south of Puerto Ángel, Oaxaca.

June 23

- 18:00 UTC (11:00 a.m. PDT) at 12.2°N 101.0°W – Tropical Storm Blas strengthens into a Category 1 hurricane on the Saffir–Simpson scale about 330 mi (530 km) south-southwest of Acapulco, Guerrero.

June 24

- 06:00 UTC (11:00 p.m. PDT, June 23) at 13.3°N 103.3°W – Hurricane Blas strengthens to Category 2 intensity about 335 mi (535 km) southwest of Acapulco.
- 12:00 UTC (5:00 a.m. PDT) at 13.8°N 104.2°W – Hurricane Blas strengthens to Category 3 intensity about 355 mi (575 km) southwest of Acapulco.

June 25

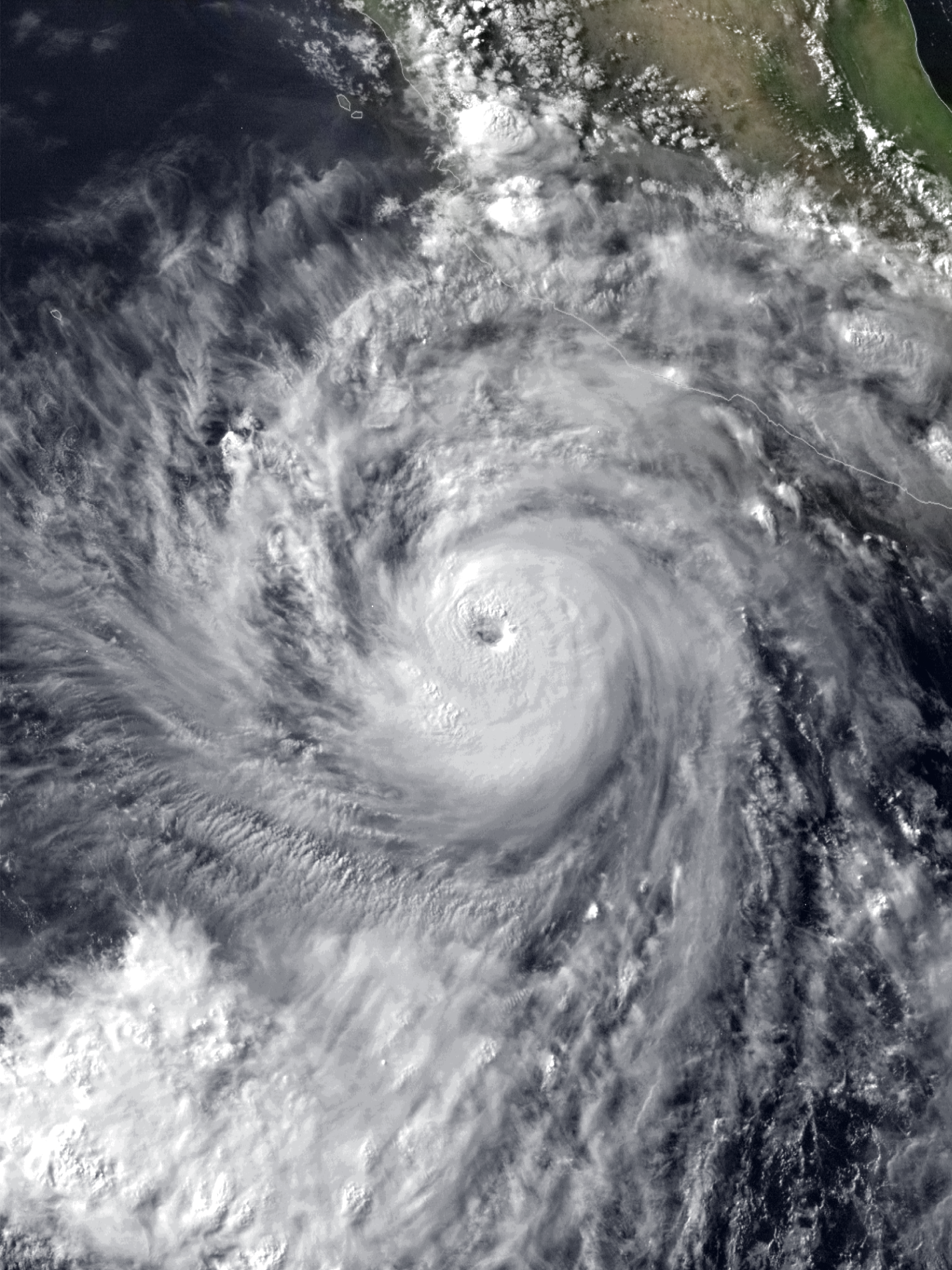
Hurricane Blas just prior to peak intensity early on June 25

- 00:00 UTC (5:00 p.m. PDT, June 24) at 14.8°N 106.0°W – Hurricane Blas strengthens to Category 4 intensity about 430 mi (695 km) west-southwest of Acapulco.
- 06:00 UTC (11:00 p.m. PDT, June 24) at 15.3°N 106.8°W – Hurricane Blas attains its peak intensity, with maximum sustained winds of 140 mph (220 km/h) and a minimum central pressure of 943 mbar (27.85 inHg), about 565 mi (905 km) south-southeast of the southern tip of the Baja California peninsula.

June 26

- 00:00 UTC (5:00 p.m. PDT, June 25) at 16.8°N 109.6°W – Hurricane Blas weakens to Category 3 intensity about 420 mi (675 km) south of the southern tip of the Baja California peninsula.
- 18:00 UTC (11:00 a.m. PDT) at 17.5°N 112.8°W – Hurricane Blas weakens to Category 2 intensity about 415 mi (665 km) south-southwest of the southern tip of the Baja California peninsula.

June 27

- 06:00 UTC (11:00 p.m. PDT, June 26) at 17.7°N 115.1°W – Hurricane Blas weakens to Category 1 intensity about 490 mi (785 km) southwest of the southern tip of the Baja California peninsula.

June 28

- 12:00 UTC (5:00 a.m. PDT) at 17.9°N 120.9°W – Hurricane Blas weakens into a tropical storm about 790 mi (1,270 km) west-southwest of the southern tip of the Baja California peninsula.

June 30

- 00:00 UTC (5:00 p.m. PDT, June 29) at 18.2°N 127.8°W – Tropical Storm Blas weakens into a tropical depression about 1,195 mi (1,925 km) west-southwest of the southern tip of the Baja California peninsula.
- 18:00 UTC (11:00 a.m. PDT) at 18.0°N 131.8°W – Tropical Depression Blas is last noted as a tropical cyclone about 1,450 mi (2,335 km) west-southwest of the southern tip of the Baja California peninsula, dissipating shortly thereafter.

=== July ===
July 17

- 06:00 UTC (11:00 p.m. PDT, July 16) at 16.9°N 104.6°W – A tropical depression forms from a tropical wave about 150 mi (240 km) south of Manzanillo, Colima.
- 12:00 UTC (5:00 a.m. PDT) at 17.5°N 105.9°W – The recently formed tropical depression strengthens into Tropical Storm Celia about 150 mi (240 km) southwest of Manzanillo.

July 19

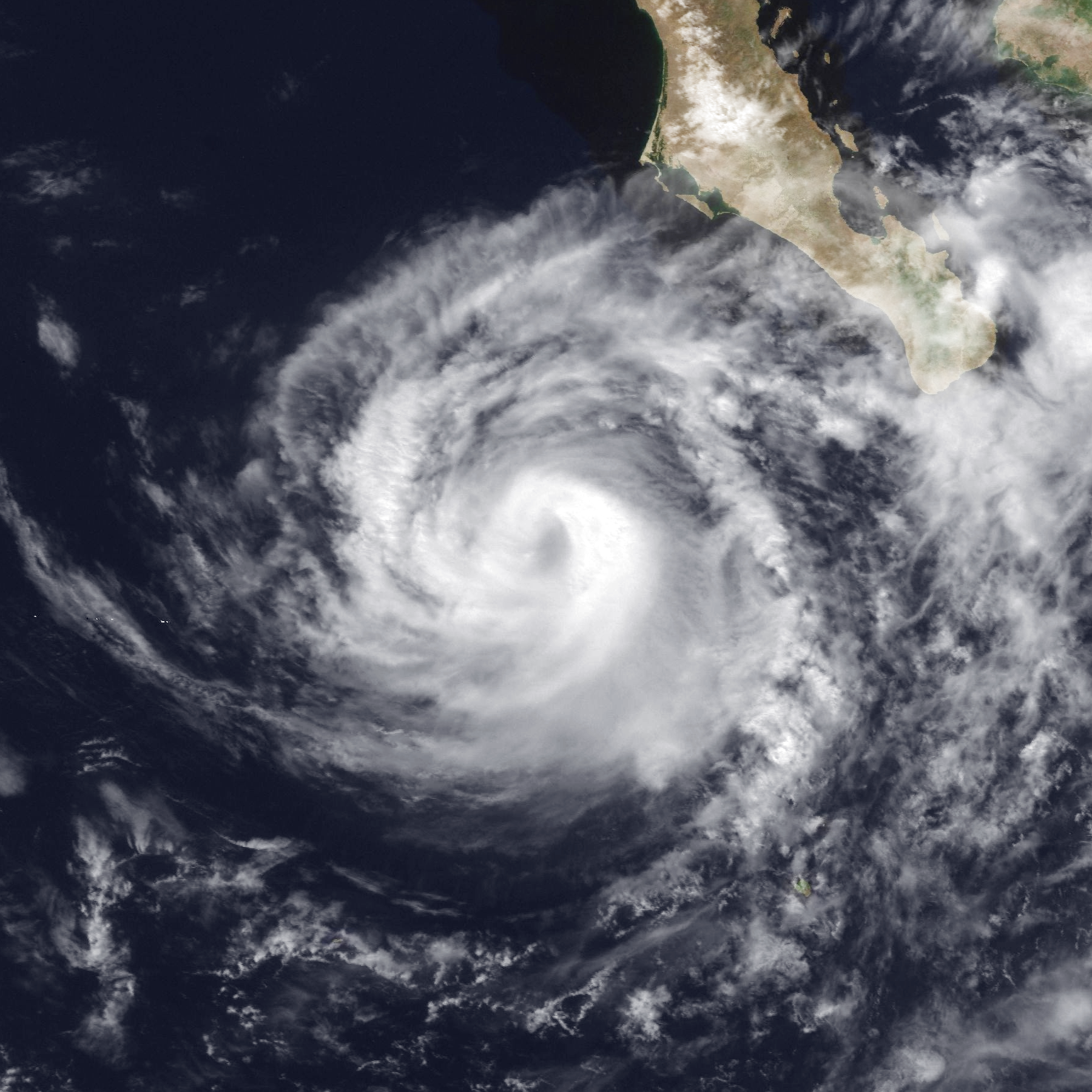
Tropical Storm Celia near peak intensity late on July 18

- 00:00 UTC (5:00 p.m. PDT, July 18) at 21.8°N 113.7°W – Tropical Storm Celia attains its peak intensity, with maximum sustained winds of 60 mph (95 km/h) and a minimum central pressure of 997 mbar (29.44 inHg), about 245 mi (400 km) west-southwest of the southern tip of the Baja California peninsula.

July 20

- 06:00 UTC (11:00 p.m. PDT, July 19) at 22.2°N 118.0°W – Tropical Storm Celia weakens into a tropical depression about 510 mi (825 km) west of the southern tip of the Baja California peninsula.

July 21

- 06:00 UTC (11:00 p.m. PDT, July 20) at 22.8°N 121.6°W – Tropical Depression Celia is last noted as a tropical cyclone about 740 mi (1,195 km) west of the southern tip of the Baja California peninsula, dissipating shortly thereafter.

July 23

- 00:00 UTC (5:00 p.m. PDT, July 22) at 12.4°N 111.0°W – Tropical Depression Five-E forms from a tropical wave about 720 mi (1,160 km) south of the southern tip of the Baja California peninsula.
- 18:00 UTC (11:00 a.m. PDT) at 13.1°N 113.7°W – Tropical Depression Five-E strengthens into Tropical Storm Darby about 720 mi (1,160 km) south-southwest of the southern tip of the Baja California peninsula.

July 24

- 12:00 UTC (5:00 a.m. PDT) at 14.0°N 116.3°W – Tropical Storm Darby strengthens into a Category 1 hurricane about 740 mi (1,195 km) southwest of the southern tip of the Baja California peninsula.

July 25

- 00:00 UTC (5:00 p.m. PDT, July 24) at 14.8°N 118.3°W – Hurricane Darby strengthens to Category 2 intensity about 775 mi (1,250 km) southwest of the southern tip of the Baja California peninsula.
- 06:00 UTC (11:00 p.m. PDT, July 24) at 15.3°N 119.3°W – Hurricane Darby strengthens to Category 3 intensity about 800 mi (1,285 km) southwest of the southern tip of the Baja California peninsula.
- 18:00 UTC (11:00 a.m. PDT) at 15.8°N 121.5°W – Hurricane Darby weakens to Category 2 intensity about 900 mi (1,445 km) southwest of the southern tip of the Baja California peninsula.

July 26

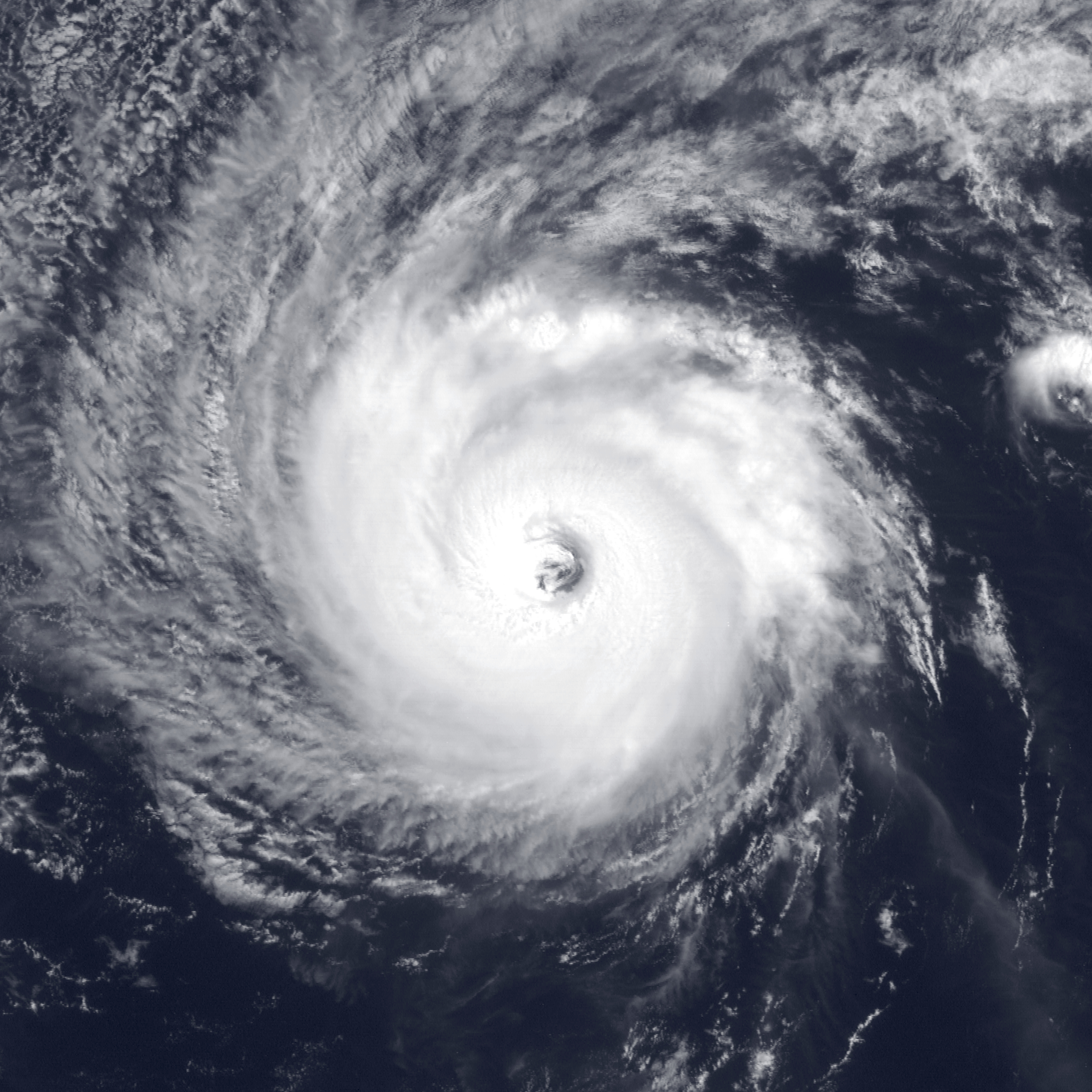
Hurricane Darby at peak intensity on July 26

- 18:00 UTC (11:00 a.m. PDT) at 16.3°N 126.5°W – Hurricane Darby restrengthens to Category 3 intensity about 1,170 mi (1,880 km) west-southwest of the southern tip of the Baja California peninsula. It simultaneously attains its peak intensity, with maximum sustained winds of 115 mph (185 km/h) and a minimum central pressure of 958 mbar (28.29 inHg).

July 28

- 06:00 UTC (11:00 p.m. PDT, July 27) at 17.4°N 134.6°W – Hurricane Darby weakens back to Category 2 intensity about 1,640 mi (2,640 km) west-southwest of the southern tip of the Baja California peninsula.
- 18:00 UTC (11:00 a.m. PDT) at 18.0°N 137.6°W – Hurricane Darby weakens to Category 1 intensity about 1,820 mi (2,925 km) west of the southern tip of the Baja California peninsula, and later crosses into the Central Pacific basin.

July 29

- 12:00 UTC (2:00 a.m. HST) at 19.4°N 141.8°W – Hurricane Darby weakens into a tropical storm about 865 mi (1,390 km) east of Hilo, Hawaii.
- 18:00 UTC (11:00 a.m. PDT) at 14.6°N 100.9°W – Tropical Depression Six-E forms from a tropical wave about 175 mi (280 km) south-southwest of Acapulco.

July 30

- 06:00 UTC (11:00 p.m. PDT, July 29) at 14.7°N 103.0°W – Tropical Depression Six-E strengthens into Tropical Storm Estelle about 255 mi (405 km) southwest of Acapulco.

July 31

- 06:00 UTC (8:00 p.m. HST, July 30) at 23.3°N 150.1°W – Tropical Storm Darby weakens into a tropical depression about 405 mi (650 km) northeast of Hilo.
- 06:00 UTC (11:00 p.m. PDT, July 30) at 15.1°N 107.1°W – Tropical Storm Estelle strengthens into a Category 1 hurricane about 330 mi (530 km) southwest of Manzanillo.

=== August ===
August 1

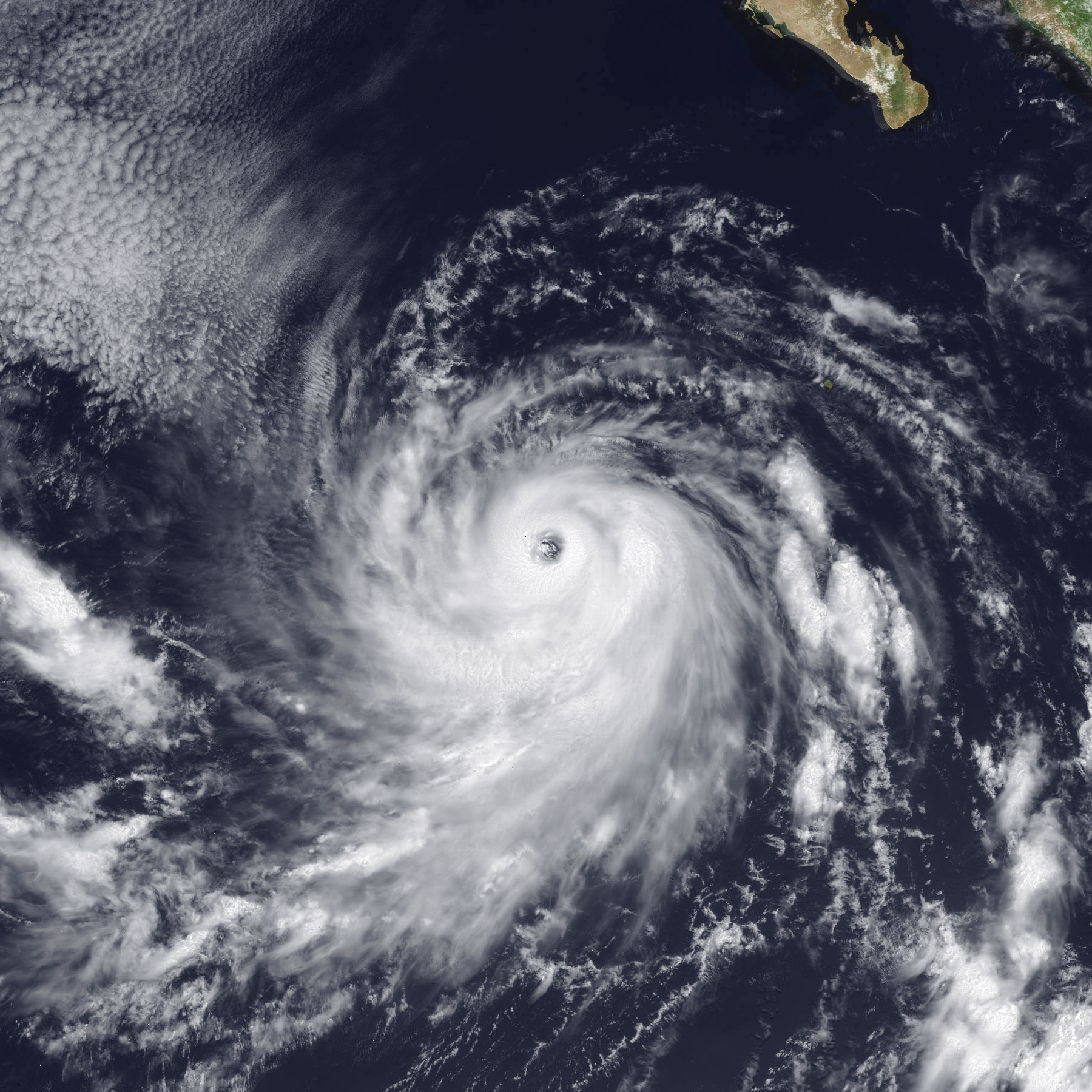
Hurricane Estelle after becoming a major hurricane late on August 1

- 00:00 UTC (2:00 p.m. HST, July 31) at 23.6°N 153.6°W – Tropical Depression Darby is last noted as a tropical cyclone about 290 mi (465 km) north-northeast of Hilo, and dissipates shortly thereafter.
- 12:00 UTC (5:00 a.m. PDT) at 15.9°N 113.5°W – Hurricane Estelle strengthens to Category 2 intensity about 535 mi (860 km) south-southwest of the southern tip of the Baja California peninsula.
- 18:00 UTC (11:00 a.m. PDT) at 16.1°N 115.0°W – Hurricane Estelle strengthens to Category 3 intensity about 570 mi (915 km) southwest of the southern tip of the Baja California peninsula.

August 2

- 06:00 UTC (11:00 p.m. PDT, August 1) at 16.8°N 117.5°W – Hurricane Estelle strengthens to Category 4 intensity about 645 mi (1,035 km) southwest of the southern tip of the Baja California peninsula. It simultaneously attains its peak intensity, with maximum sustained winds of 130 mph (215 km/h) and a minimum central pressure of 948 mbar (27.99 inHg).
- 12:00 UTC (5:00 a.m. PDT) at 17.2°N 118.6°W – Hurricane Estelle weakens to Category 3 strength about 685 mi (1,100 km) southwest of the southern tip of the Baja California peninsula.

August 3

- 00:00 UTC (5:00 p.m. PDT, August 2) at 18.1°N 121.1°W – Hurricane Estelle weakens to Category 2 intensity about 795 mi (1,280 km) west-southwest of the southern tip of the Baja California peninsula.
- 12:00 UTC (5:00 a.m. PDT) at 18.9°N 123.5°W – Hurricane Estelle weakens to Category 1 intensity about 915 mi (1,470 km) west-southwest of the southern tip of the Baja California peninsula.

August 4

- 06:00 UTC (11:00 p.m. PDT, August 3) at 18.6°N 127.8°W – Hurricane Estelle weakens into a tropical storm about 1,190 mi (1,915 km) west-southwest of the southern tip of the Baja California peninsula.

August 5

- 12:00 UTC (5:00 a.m. PDT) at 19.4°N 133.3°W – Tropical Storm Estelle weakens into a tropical depression about 1,520 mi (2,445 km) west of the southern tip of the Baja California peninsula, and later crosses into the Central Pacific basin.

August 6

- 12:00 UTC (5:00 a.m. PDT) at 16.7°N 111.5°W – Tropical Depression Seven-E forms from a tropical wave about 435 mi (705 km) south-southwest of the southern tip of the Baja California peninsula.

August 8

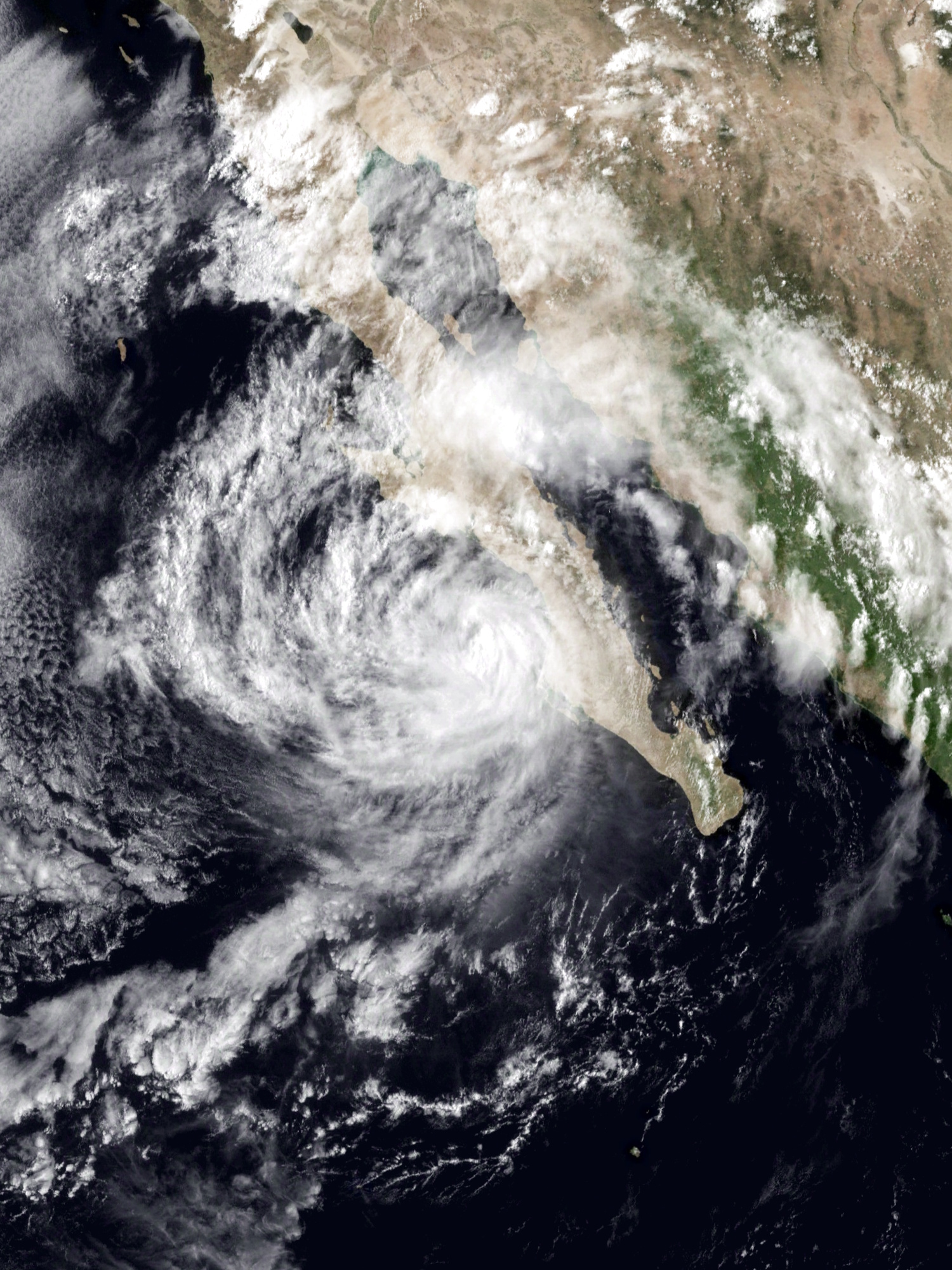
Tropical Storm Frank near peak intensity late on August 8

- 00:00 UTC (5:00 p.m. PDT, August 7) at 21.3°N 112.1°W – Tropical Depression Seven-E strengthens into Tropical Storm Frank about 175 mi (280 km) southwest of the southern tip of the Baja California peninsula.
- 18:00 UTC (8:00 a.m. HST) at 22.7°N 148.7°W – Tropical Depression Estelle is last noted as a tropical cyclone about 460 mi (740 km) east-northeast of Hilo, dissipating shortly thereafter.

August 9

- 00:00 UTC (5:00 p.m. PDT, August 8) at 25.4°N 113.3°W – Tropical Storm Frank attains its peak intensity, with maximum sustained winds of 45 mph (75 km/h) and a minimum central pressure of 1001 mbar (29.56 inHg), about 75 mi (120 km) northwest of Cabo San Lázaro.
- 12:00 UTC (5:00 a.m. PDT) at 27.1°N 114.9°W – Tropical Storm Frank weakens into a tropical depression about 85 mi (140 km) west-northwest of Punta Abreojos.

August 10

- 00:00 UTC (5:00 p.m. PDT, August 9) at 28.6°N 117.1°W – Tropical Depression Frank is last noted as a tropical cyclone about 130 mi (215 km) west-northwest of Punta Eugenia, dissipating shortly thereafter.

August 11

- 00:00 UTC (5:00 p.m. PDT, August 10) at 11.0°N 108.9°W – Tropical Depression Eight-E forms from an area of low pressure about 635 mi (1,020 km) south-southwest of Manzanillo.
- 18:00 UTC (11:00 a.m. PDT) at 12.2°N 110.5°W – Tropical Depression Eight-E strengthens into Tropical Storm Georgette about 625 mi (1,010 km) southwest of Manzanillo.

August 13

- 00:00 UTC (5:00 p.m. PDT, August 12) at 15.2°N 114.6°W – Tropical Storm Georgette strengthens into a Category 1 hurricane about 610 mi (980 km) south-southwest of the southern tip of the Baja California peninsula.
- 18:00 UTC (11:00 a.m. PDT) at 16.9°N 117.3°W – Hurricane Georgette strengthens to Category 2 intensity about 635 mi (1,020 km) southwest of the southern tip of the Baja California peninsula.

August 14

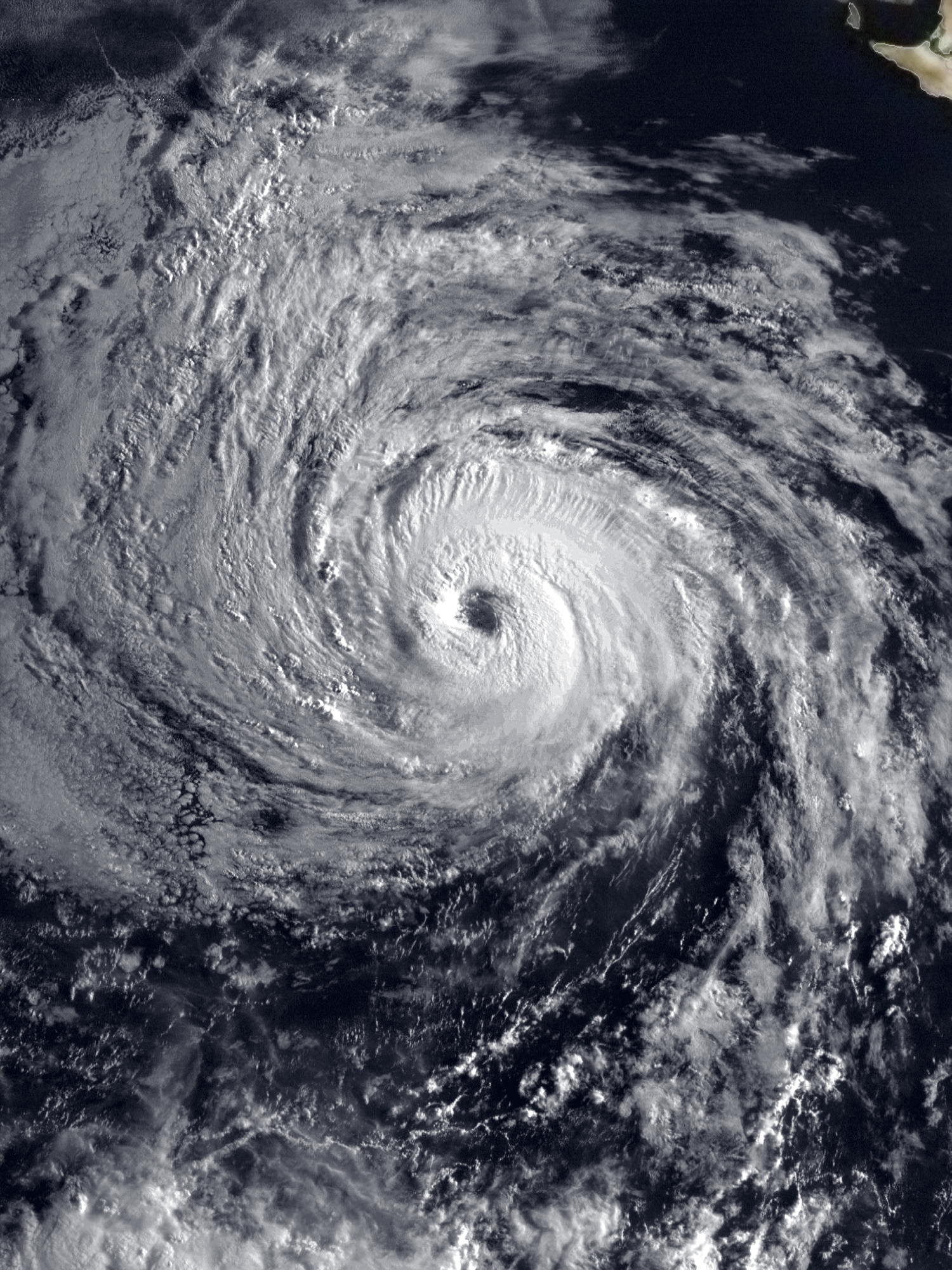
Hurricane Georgette near peak intensity on August 14

- 12:00 UTC (5:00 a.m. PDT) at 19.8°N 120.1°W – Hurricane Georgette strengthens to Category 3 intensity about 685 mi (1,100 km) west-southwest of the southern tip of the Baja California peninsula. It simultaneously attains its peak intensity, with maximum sustained winds of 115 mph (185 km/h) and a minimum central pressure of 960 mbar (28.35 inHg).

August 15

- 00:00 UTC (5:00 p.m. PDT, August 14) at 21.8°N 122.1°W – Hurricane Georgette weakens to Category 2 intensity about 775 mi (1,250 km) west of the southern tip of the Baja California peninsula.
- 18:00 UTC (11:00 a.m. PDT) at 23.9°N 124.6°W – Hurricane Georgette weakens to Category 1 intensity about 930 mi (1,500 km) west of the southern tip of the Baja California peninsula.

August 16

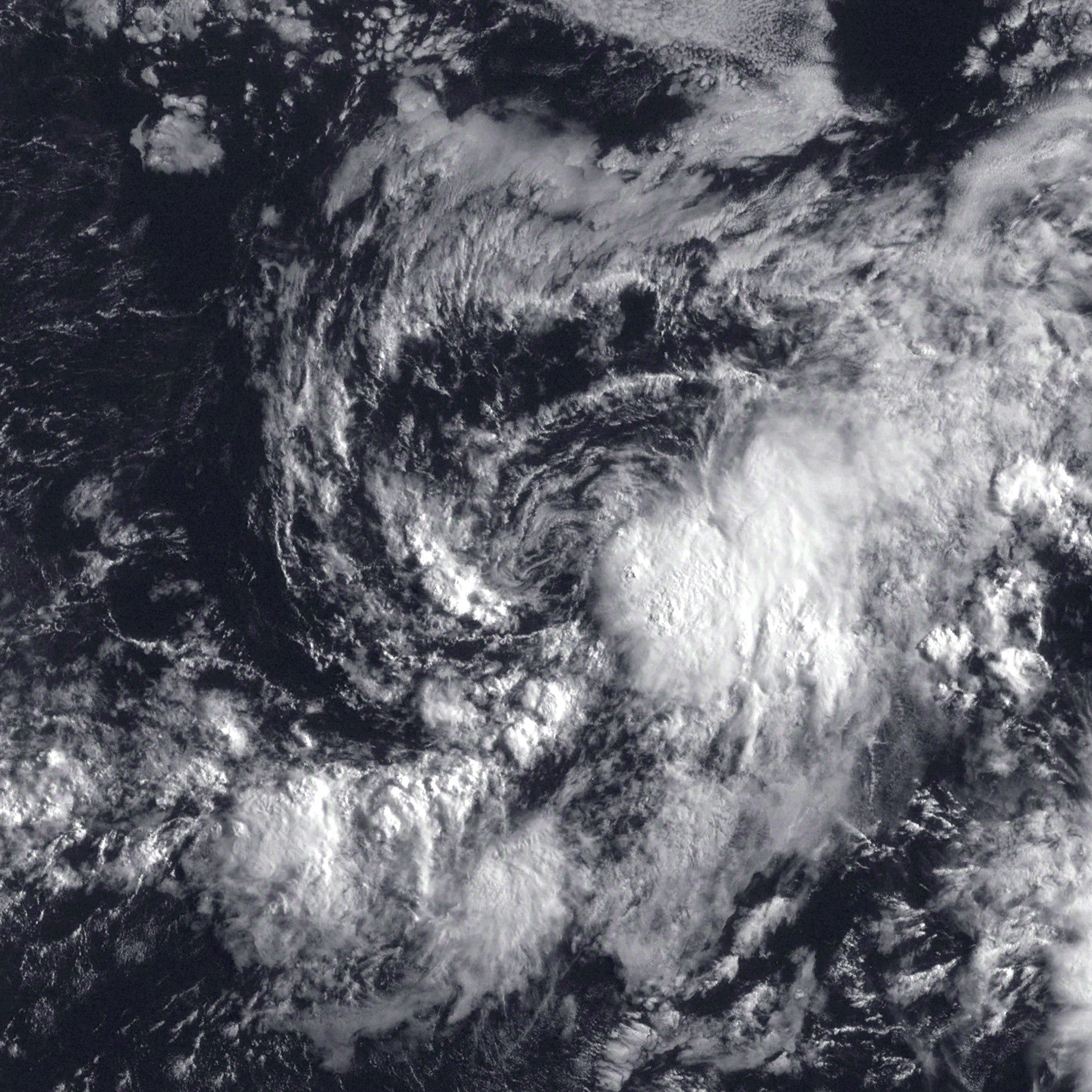
Tropical Depression One-C at peak intensity on August 16

- 00:00 UTC (2:00 p.m. HST, August 15) at 13.1°N 142.3°W – Tropical Depression One-C forms from an area of unsettled weather about 960 mi (1,545 km) east-southeast of Hilo. (Note: While the Central Pacific Hurricane Center's (CPHC) year-end report stated that Tropical Depression One-C formed at 12:00 UTC on August 16, the Eastern and Central Pacific Hurricane Database (HURDAT) lists the depression as having formed 12 hours earlier.)
- 06:00 UTC (11:00 p.m. PDT, August 15) at 24.6°N 125.8°W – Hurricane Georgette weakens into a tropical storm about 1,005 mi (1,620 km) west of the southern tip of the Baja California peninsula.
- 12:00 UTC (2:00 a.m. HST) at 13.4°N 143.7°W – Tropical Depression One-C attains its peak intensity, with maximum sustained winds of 35 mph (55 km/h) and an unknown minimum central pressure, about 870 mi (1,400 km) east-southeast of Hilo.

August 17

- 00:00 UTC (5:00 p.m. PDT, August 16) at 24.9°N 126.7°W – Tropical Storm Georgette weakens into a tropical depression about 1,065 mi (1,715 km) west of the southern tip of the Baja California peninsula, and later dissipates.

August 19

- 00:00 UTC (2:00 p.m. HST, August 18) at 14.4°N 154.5°W – Tropical Depression One-C is last noted as a tropical cyclone about 370 mi (595 km) south of Hilo, dissipating shortly thereafter.

August 20

- 06:00 UTC (11:00 p.m. PDT, August 19) at 10.5°N 96.5°W – A tropical depression forms from an area of low pressure about 355 mi (575 km) south of Puerto Ángel, Oaxaca.

August 21

- 00:00 UTC (5:00 p.m. PDT, August 20) at 10.7°N 99.8°W – The recently formed tropical depression strengthens into Tropical Storm Howard about 425 mi (685 km) south of Acapulco.
- 18:00 UTC (11:00 a.m. PDT) at 11.6°N 102.4°W – Tropical Storm Howard strengthens into a Category 1 hurricane about 530 mi (850 km) south-southeast of Manzanillo.

August 22

- 06:00 UTC (11:00 p.m. PDT, August 21) at 12.8°N 104.4°W – Hurricane Howard strengthens to Category 2 intensity about 430 mi (695 km) south of Manzanillo.
- 12:00 UTC (5:00 a.m. PDT) at 13.4°N 105.6°W – Hurricane Howard strengthens to Category 3 intensity about 395 mi (640 km) south of Manzanillo.

August 23

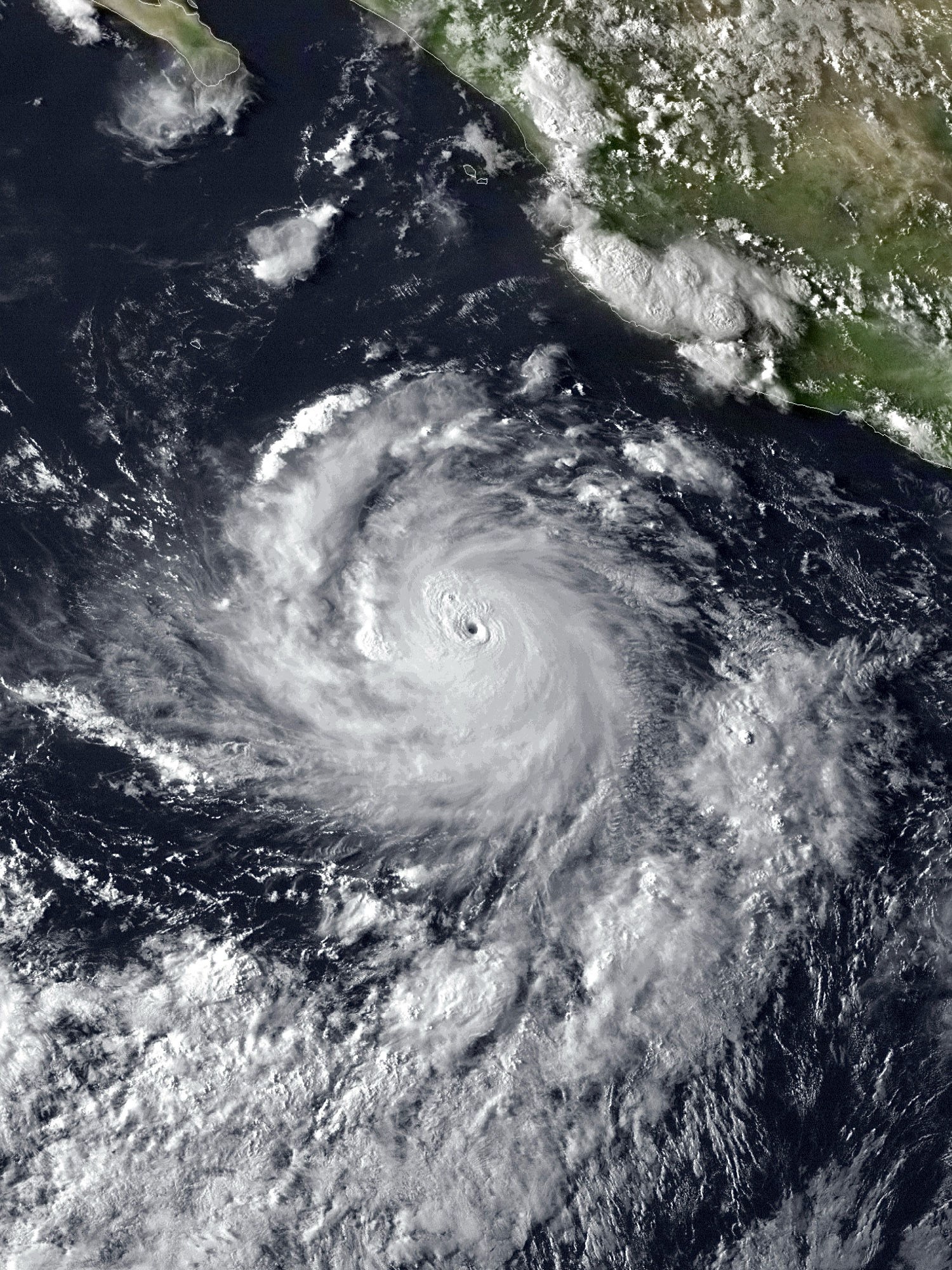
Hurricane Howard at peak intensity early on August 23

- 00:00 UTC (5:00 p.m. PDT, August 22) at 14.4°N 108.0°W – Hurricane Howard strengthens to Category 4 intensity about 600 mi (965 km) south of the southern tip of the Baja California peninsula. It simultaneously attains its peak intensity, with maximum sustained winds of 150 mph (240 km/h) and a minimum central pressure of 932 mbar (27.52 inHg), making it the strongest storm of the season.

August 24

- 06:00 UTC (11:00 p.m. PDT, August 23) at 15.8°N 113.7°W – Hurricane Howard weakens to Category 3 intensity about 545 mi (880 km) south-southwest of the southern tip of the Baja California peninsula.

August 25

- 00:00 UTC (5:00 p.m. PDT, August 24) at 16.8°N 117.0°W – Hurricane Howard restrengthens to Category 4 intensity about 620 mi (1,000 km) southwest of the southern tip of the Baja California peninsula.

August 26

- 06:00 UTC (11:00 p.m. PDT, August 25) at 17.5°N 122.1°W – Hurricane Howard weakens back to Category 3 intensity about 870 mi (1,400 km) west-southwest of the southern tip of the Baja California peninsula.
- 18:00 UTC (11:00 a.m. PDT) at 17.5°N 123.4°W – Hurricane Howard weakens to Category 2 intensity about 945 mi (1,520 km) west-southwest of the southern tip of the Baja California peninsula.

August 27

- 06:00 UTC (11:00 p.m. PDT, August 26) at 18.0°N 124.4°W – Hurricane Howard weakens to Category 1 intensity about 990 mi (1,595 km) west-southwest of the southern tip of the Baja California peninsula.

August 28

- 00:00 UTC (5:00 p.m. PDT, August 27) at 19.5°N 126.4°W – Hurricane Howard weakens into a tropical storm about 1,080 mi (1,740 km) west-southwest of the southern tip of the Baja California peninsula.

August 29

- 12:00 UTC (5:00 a.m. PDT) at 19.7°N 131.2°W – Tropical Storm Howard weakens into a tropical depression about 1,380 mi (2,220 km) west-southwest of the southern tip of the Baja California peninsula.

August 30

- 00:00 UTC (5:00 p.m. PDT) at 18.8°N 133.5°W – Tropical Depression Howard is last noted as a tropical depression about 1,540 mi (2,480 km) west-southwest of the southern tip of the Baja California peninsula, and dissipates shortly thereafter.

=== September ===
September 1

- 00:00 UTC (5:00 p.m. PDT, August 31) at 18.3°N 109.2°W – A tropical depression forms from a tropical wave about 320 mi (520 km) south of the southern tip of the Baja California peninsula.
- 18:00 UTC (11:00 a.m. PDT) at 20.0°N 109.6°W – The recently formed tropical depression strengthens into Tropical Storm Isis about 200 mi (325 km) south of the southern tip of the Baja California peninsula.

September 2

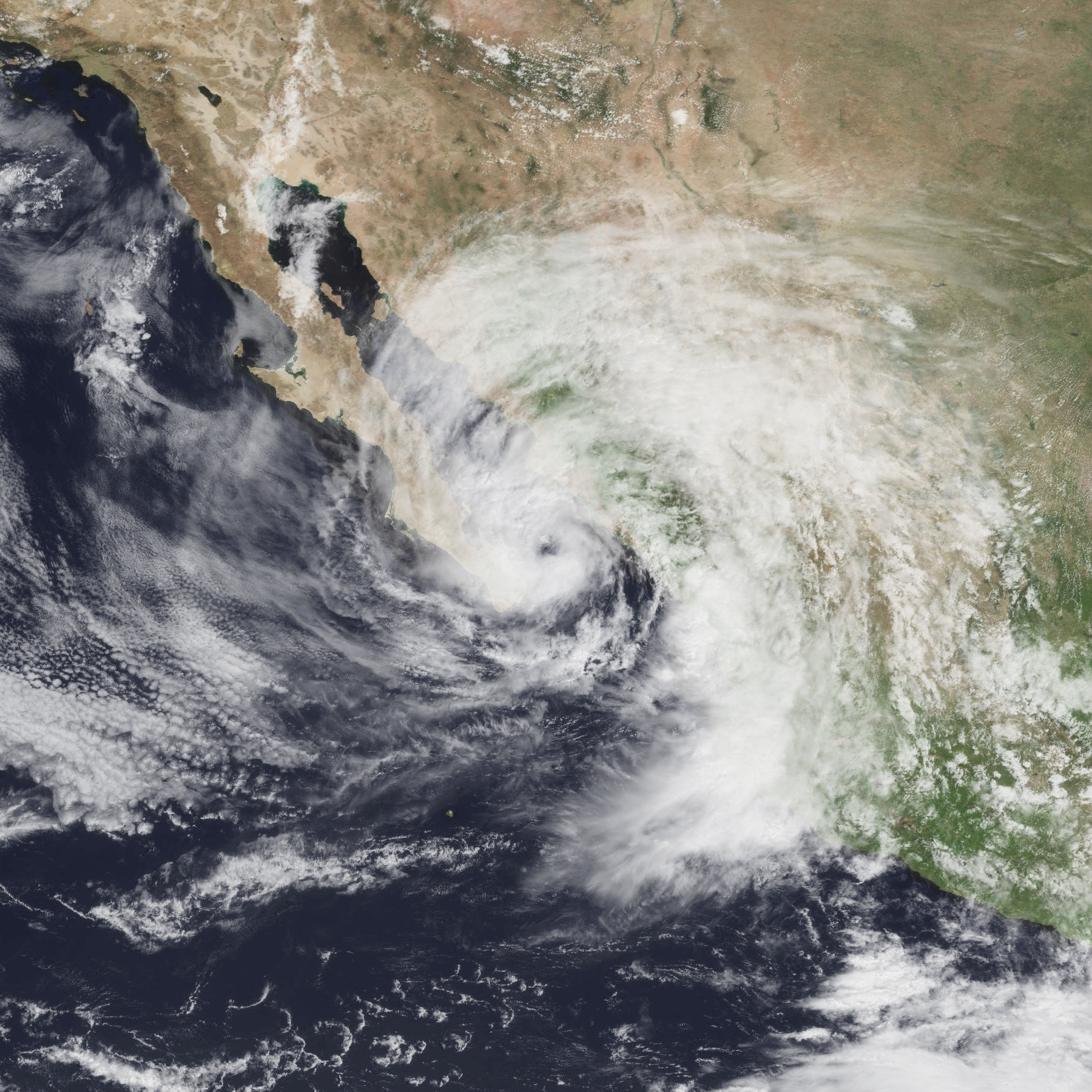
Hurricane Isis at peak intensity over the Gulf of California late on September 2

- 12:00 UTC (5:00 a.m. PDT) at 23.3°N 109.4°W – Tropical Storm Isis makes its first landfall about 25 mi (35 km) east-northeast of San José del Cabo, Baja California Sur, with maximum sustained winds of 70 mph (110 km/h) and a minimum central pressure of 990 mbar (29.23 inHg), and later emerges over the Gulf of California.
- 18:00 UTC (11:00 a.m. PDT) at 24.1°N 109.2°W – Tropical Storm Isis strengthens into a Category 1 hurricane about 80 mi (130 km) north-northeast of San José del Cabo. It simultaneously attains its peak intensity, with maximum sustained winds of 75 mph (120 km/h) and a minimum central pressure of 988 mbar (29.18 inHg).

September 3

- 03:00 UTC (8:00 p.m. PDT, September 2) at 25.5°N 109.0°W – Hurricane Isis makes its second and final landfall at Topolobampo, Sinaloa, with maximum sustained winds of 75 mph (120 km/h) and a minimum central pressure of 990 mbar (29.23 inHg).
- 06:00 UTC (11:00 p.m. PDT, September 2) at 26.1°N 109.1°W – Hurricane Isis weakens into a tropical storm inland, about 35 mi (55 km) north of Topolobampo.
- 18:00 UTC (11:00 a.m. PDT) at 28.0°N 109.5°W – Tropical Storm Isis weakens into a tropical depression inland, about 165 mi (270 km) north of Topolobampo, and later dissipates.

September 6

- 12:00 UTC (5:00 a.m. PDT) at 17.8°N 106.8°W – Tropical Depression Eleven-E forms from an interaction between a tropical wave and a broad area of low pressure about 205 mi (335 km) west-southwest of Manzanillo.

September 7

- 18:00 UTC (11:00 a.m. PDT) at 20.2°N 110.5°W – The recently formed tropical depression strengthens into Tropical Storm Javier about 105 mi (165 km) north-northeast of Socorro Island.

September 8

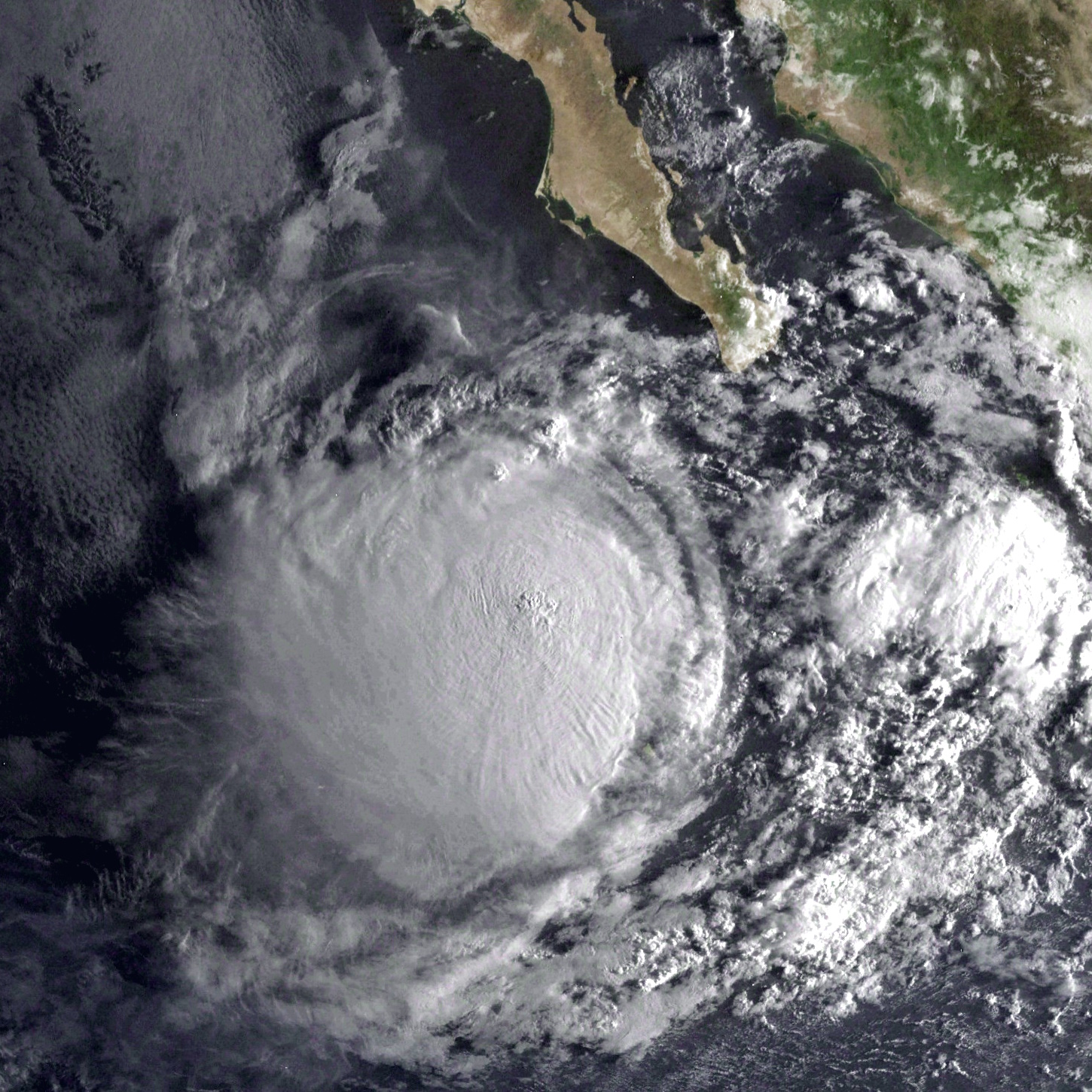
Tropical Storm Javier near peak intensity on September 8

- 12:00 UTC (5:00 a.m. PDT) at 20.8°N 112.2°W – Tropical Storm Javier attains its peak intensity, with maximum sustained winds of 60 mph (95 km/h) and a minimum central pressure of 995 mbar (29.38 inHg), about 160 mi (260 km) north-northwest of Socorro Island.

September 9

- 18:00 UTC (11:00 a.m. PDT) at 20.9°N 111.7°W – Tropical Storm Javier weakens into a tropical depression about 155 mi (250 km) north-northwest of Socorro Island.

September 12

- 12:00 UTC (5:00 a.m. PDT) at 17.9°N 107.6°W – Tropical Depression Javier restrengthens into a tropical storm about 230 mi (370 km) west-southwest of Manzanillo.

September 13

- 18:00 UTC (11:00 a.m. PDT) at 19.8°N 105.6°W – Tropical Storm Javier weakens back into a tropical depression about 40 mi (65 km) south of Cabo Corrientes, Jalisco.

September 14

- 00:00 UTC (5:00 p.m. PDT) at 20.0°N 105.5°W – Tropical Depression Javier makes landfall about 35 mi (55 km) south-southeast of Cabo Corrientes with maximum sustained winds of 35 mph (55 km/h) and a minimum central pressure of 1001 mbar (29.56 inHg), and later dissipates just inland from the coast.

=== October ===
October 1

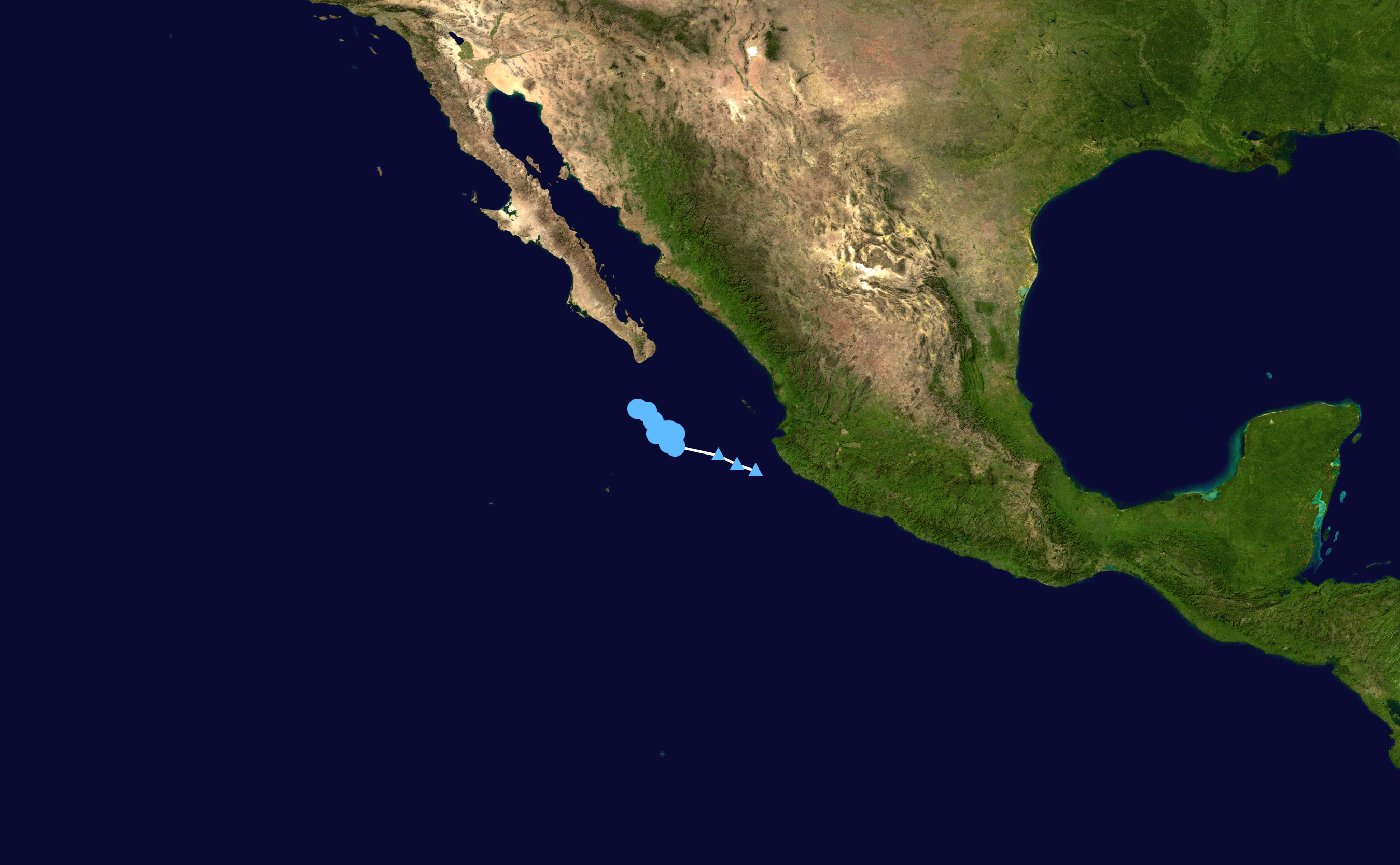
Storm path of Tropical Depression Twelve-E

- 18:00 UTC (11:00 a.m. PDT) at 20.5°N 109.0°W – Tropical Depression Twelve-E forms from an area of unsettled weather about 175 mi (280 km) south-southeast of the southern tip of the Baja California peninsula.

October 3

- 00:00 UTC (5:00 p.m. PDT, October 2) at 21.0°N 109.5°W – Tropical Depression Twelve-E attains its peak intensity, with maximum sustained winds of 35 mph (55 km/h) and a minimum central pressure of 1003 mbar (29.62 inHg), about 130 mi (215 km) south of the southern tip of the Baja California peninsula.
- 12:00 UTC (5:00 a.m. PDT) at 21.4°N 110.0°W – Tropical Depression Twelve-E is last noted as a tropical cyclone about 105 mi (165 km) south of the southern tip of the Baja California peninsula, dissipating shortly thereafter.

October 13

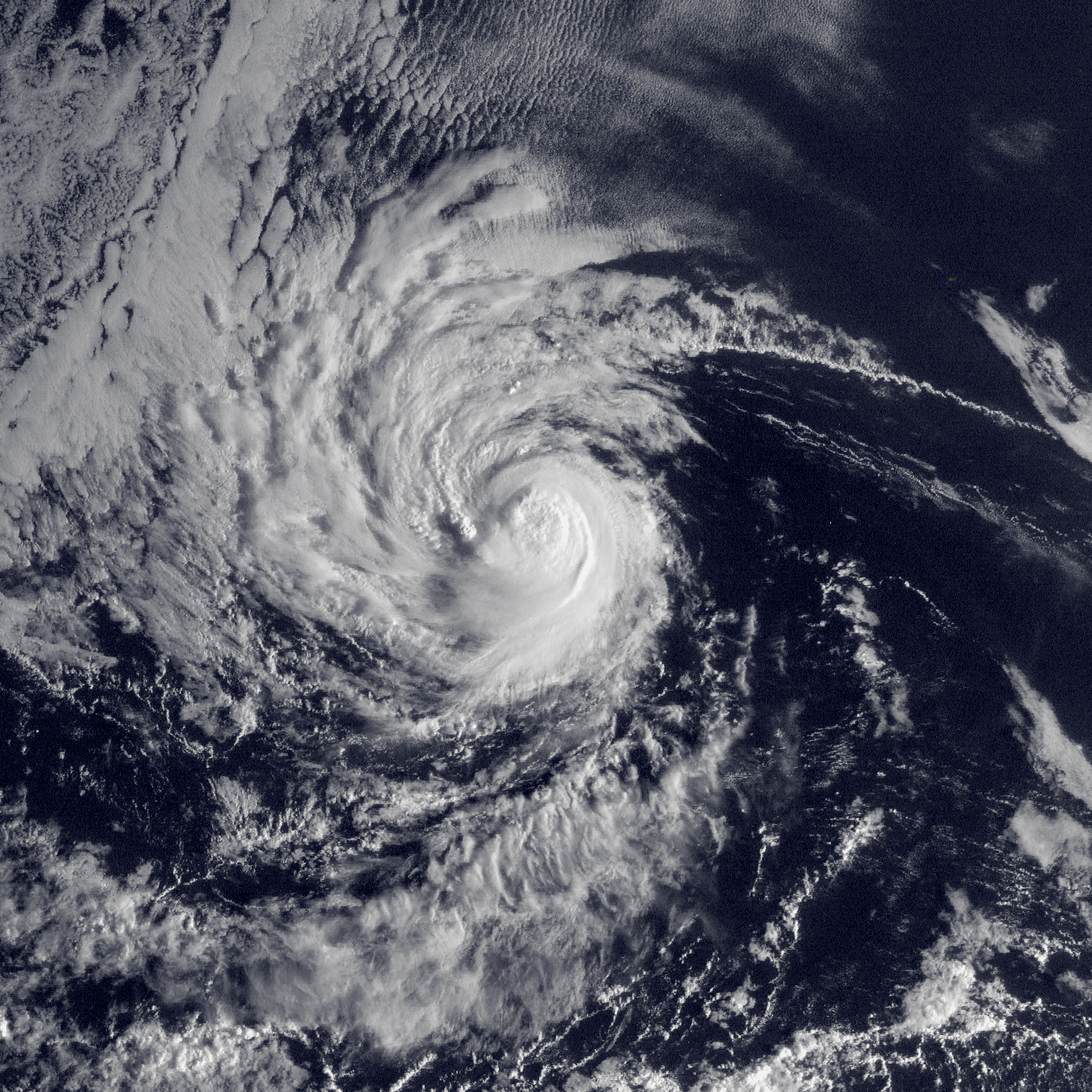
A strengthening Tropical Storm Kay on October 13

- 00:00 UTC (5:00 p.m. PDT, October 12) at 15.8°N 117.9°W – Tropical Depression Thirteen-E forms from an Intertropical Convergence Zone disturbance about 715 mi (1,150 km) southwest of the southern tip of the Baja California peninsula.
- 06:00 UTC (11:00 p.m. PDT, October 12) at 15.9°N 118.2°W – Tropical Depression Thirteen-E strengthens into Tropical Storm Kay about 720 mi (1,160 km) southwest of the southern tip of the Baja California peninsula.
- 18:00 UTC (11:00 a.m. PDT) at 16.0°N 118.5°W – Tropical Storm Kay strengthens into a Category 1 hurricane about 730 mi (1,175 km) southwest of the southern tip of the Baja California peninsula. It simultaneously attains its peak intensity, with maximum sustained winds of 75 mph (120 km/h) and a minimum central pressure of 987 mbar (29.15 inHg).

October 14

- 06:00 UTC (11:00 p.m. PDT, October 13) at 15.9°N 119.9°W – Hurricane Kay weakens into a tropical storm about 805 mi (1,295 km) southwest of the southern tip of the Baja California peninsula.

October 15

- 00:00 UTC (5:00 p.m. PDT, October 14) at 11.3°N 91.7°W – Tropical Depression Fourteen-E forms from an area of low pressure about 185 mi (295 km) south of Sipacate, Guatemala.
- 06:00 UTC (11:00 p.m. PDT, October 14) at 13.8°N 121.3°W – Tropical Storm Kay weakens into a tropical depression about 970 mi (1,565 km) southwest of the southern tip of the Baja California peninsula.
- 18:00 UTC (11:00 a.m. PDT) at 12.7°N 92.5°W – Tropical Depression Fourteen-E strengthens into Tropical Storm Lester about 125 mi (205 km) southwest of Sipacate.

October 16

- 00:00 UTC (5:00 p.m. PDT, October 15) at 17.8°N 107.6°W – Tropical Depression Fifteen-E forms from a tropical wave about 230 mi (370 km) west-southwest of Manzanillo.
- 12:00 UTC (5:00 a.m. PDT) at 18.9°N 108.0°W – Tropical Depression Fifteen-E strengthens into Tropical Storm Madeline about 185 mi (295 km) southwest of Cabo Corrientes.
- 18:00 UTC (11:00 a.m. PDT) at 14.2°N 94.4°W – Tropical Storm Lester strengthens into a Category 1 hurricane about 125 mi (205 km) south-southwest of Puerto Arista, Chiapas.

October 17

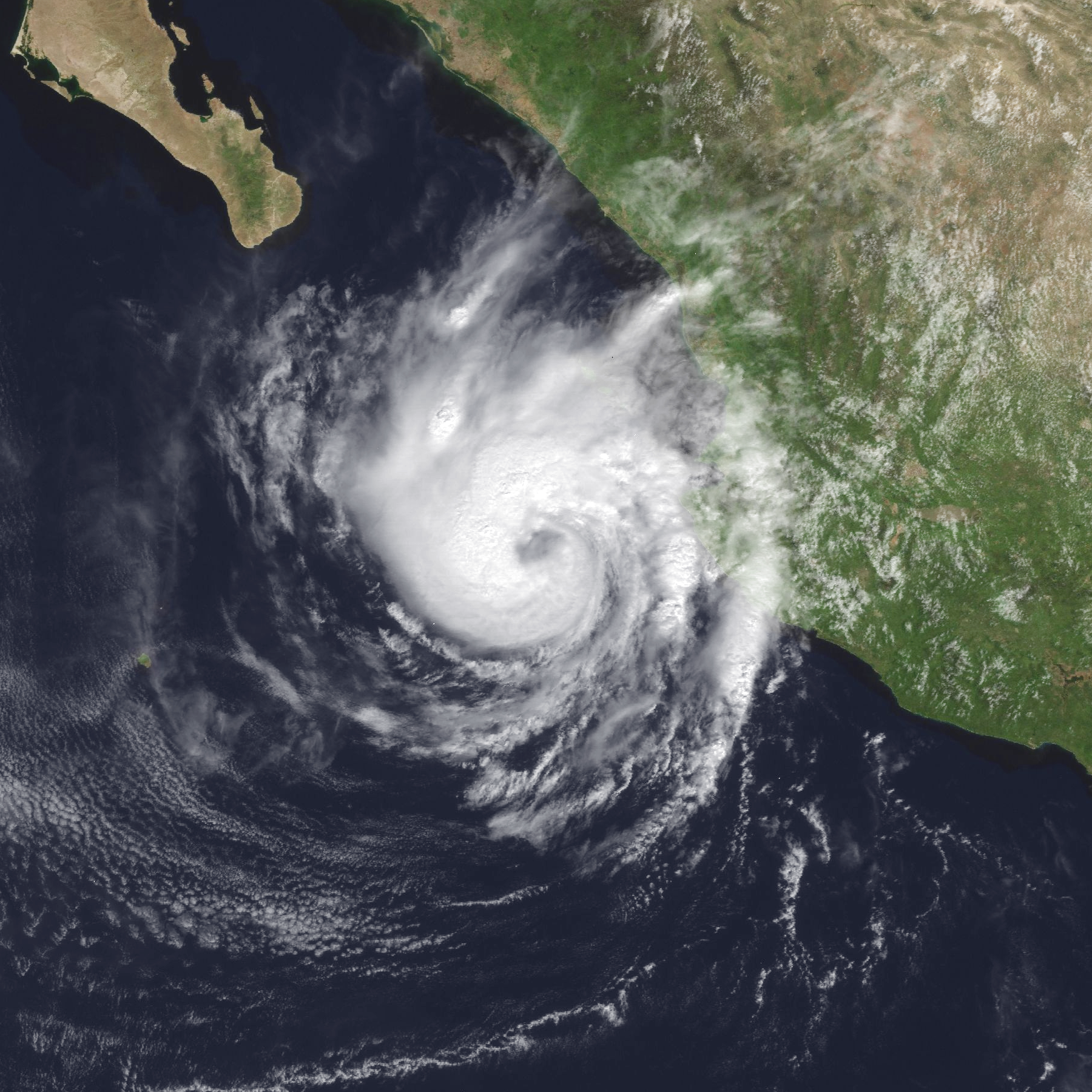
Hurricane Madeline upon being upgraded late on October 17

- 00:00 UTC (5:00 p.m. PDT, October 16) at 11.5°N 120.0°W – Tropical Depression Kay is last noted as a tropical cyclone about 1,025 mi (1,650 km) southwest of the southern tip of the Baja California peninsula, dissipating shortly thereafter.
- 12:00 UTC (5:00 a.m. PDT) at 14.5°N 95.4°W – Hurricane Lester strengthens to Category 2 intensity about 110 mi (175 km) southeast of Puerto Ángel.
- 18:00 UTC (11:00 a.m. PDT) at 19.9°N 107.2°W – Tropical Storm Madeline strengthens into a Category 1 hurricane about 105 mi (165 km) west-southwest of Cabo Corrientes.

October 19

- 00:00 UTC (5:00 p.m. PDT, October 18) at 21.2°N 106.6°W – Hurricane Madeline attains its peak intensity, with maximum sustained winds of 85 mph (140 km/h) and a minimum central pressure of 979 mbar (28.91 inHg), about 80 mi (130 km) northwest of Cabo Corrientes.
- 12:00 UTC (5:00 a.m. PDT) at 22.2°N 106.9°W – Hurricane Madeline weakens into a tropical storm about 145 mi (230 km) northwest of Cabo Corrientes.
- 18:00 UTC (11:00 a.m. PDT) at 14.6°N 102.2°W – Hurricane Lester weakens to Category 1 intensity about 215 mi (345 km) south of Zihuatanejo, Guerrero.

October 20

- 00:00 UTC (5:00 p.m. PDT, October 19) at 14.9°N 103.0°W – Hurricane Lester restrengthens to Category 2 intensity about 215 mi (345 km) south-southwest of Zihuatanejo.
- 00:00 UTC (5:00 p.m. PDT, October 19) at 23.7°N 108.5°W – Tropical Storm Madeline weakens into a tropical depression about 110 mi (175 km) east-northeast of the southern tip of the Baja California peninsula, and later dissipates.

October 22

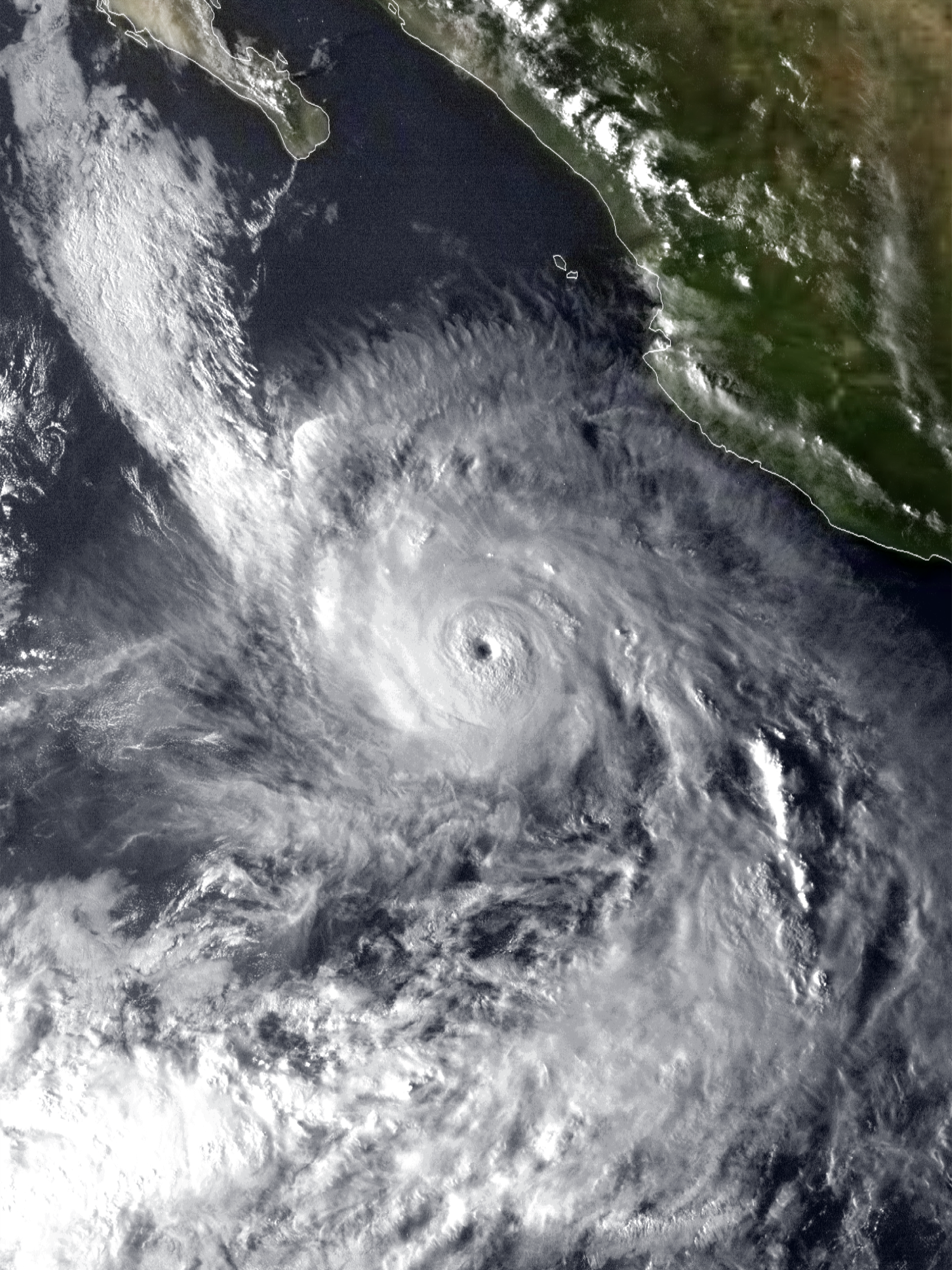
Hurricane Lester prior to peak intensity early on October 22

- 12:00 UTC (5:00 a.m. PDT) at 16.8°N 108.8°W – Hurricane Lester strengthens to Category 3 intensity about 425 mi (685 km) south of the southern tip of the Baja California peninsula. It simultaneously attains its peak intensity, with maximum sustained winds of 115 mph (185 km/h) and a minimum central pressure of 965 mbar (28.50 inHg).

October 23

- 00:00 UTC (5:00 p.m. PDT, October 22) at 16.5°N 109.0°W – Hurricane Lester weakens to Category 2 intensity about 445 mi (715 km) south of the southern tip of the Baja California peninsula.
- 06:00 UTC (11:00 p.m. PDT, October 22) at 16.3°N 109.1°W – Hurricane Lester weakens to Category 1 intensity about 455 mi (730 km) south of the southern tip of the Baja California peninsula.
- 18:00 UTC (11:00 a.m. PDT) at 15.5°N 109.7°W – Hurricane Lester weakens into a tropical storm about 510 mi (825 km) south of the southern tip of the Baja California peninsula.

October 26

- 00:00 UTC (4:00 p.m. PST, October 25) (Note: Daylight saving time ended on October 25, 1998. At 2:00 a.m. PDT, clocks were moved back to 1:00 a.m. PST.) at 17.4°N 115.1°W – Tropical Storm Lester weakens into a tropical depression about 505 mi (815 km) southwest of the southern tip of the Baja California peninsula, and later dissipates.

=== November ===
There was no tropical cyclone activity in November.

November 30

- The 1998 Pacific hurricane season officially ends.

== See also ==
- Timeline of the 1998 Atlantic hurricane season
- List of Pacific hurricanes
- Pacific hurricane season
- Tropical cyclones in 1998
