= Name changes due to the Islamic State =

Some organisations and people are or were named after an Ancient Egyptian goddess Isis

The Islamic State of Iraq and the Levant, often abbreviated as "ISIL", is a militant Islamist terrorist group. It is also known as the Islamic State of Iraq and Syria or the Islamic State of Iraq and ash-Sham, abbreviated as "ISIS" (Note: Pronounced as well as after an Ancient Egyptian goddess Isis.) or sometimes simplified as Islamic State (IS) only — which has caused name changes to distinguish other entities from the group.

== Software ==
- Version 0.3 of Linux distribution elementary OS was originally to be named as Isis but was instead renamed after a Norse goddess Freya.
- A mobile banking app previously known as ISIS changed its name to Softcard in 2014, stating "We have no desire to share a name with the Islamic State of Iraq and the Levant and our hearts go out to those affected by this violence".
- In 2015, the University of Arkansas decided to rename its course registration system from "Integrated Student Information System" to "UAConnect". National University of Singapore and Dunman High School in Singapore made similar changes to their similarly-named systems.
- Tufts University and University of Massachusetts Lowell renamed its online information system from the "Intercampus Student Information System" (ISIS) to the "Student Information System" (SIS) with only the initial letter "I" being omitted.
- In 2016, the University of Economics, Prague decided to rename its online information system from ISIS to InSIS (Integrovaný Studijní Informační Systém).
- Also in 2016, Cornell University's Isis2 Distributed Computing Library was renamed "Vsync" to eliminate any suggestion of connections to the Islamic terrorist group.
- Other universities that have renamed their software include Kansas State University, the University of Iowa, and Johns Hopkins University.

== Business ==
- In 2013, a Belgian chocolate manufacturer previously known as Italo Suisse changed its name to ISIS. But in 2014 — it changed the name again to Libeert after a decline in sales, mainly in the Anglophone world. The company was founded in 1923 and had only been called ISIS for a year.
- A British private equity firm changed its name from ISIS Equity Partners to Livingbridge to distance itself from the group.
- In 2014, a Chicago business owner renamed her store from ISIS to My Sister's Circus after people began taking pictures of her store's sign and harassing her sales staff.
- In Queens, New York, the owner of ISIS Nails renamed the salon Bess Nails and Spa because of harassment. The salon's revenue had declined by approximately 30 percent.
- In 2015, Isis Pharmaceuticals Inc. — a pharmaceutical company based in California, originally named after an Ancient Egyptian goddess. After observing relevant drop in stock and to avoid confusion, the company finally decided to change its name to Ionis Pharmaceuticals.
- Automobile performance part manufacturer ISIS Performance changed its name to ISR Performance after using it for six years to remove the negative connotation with its name. The change took place on November 17, 2015.
- The Danish dessert company ISIS changed their name to EASIS, citing the "political connotations" of their name would have on primarily export markets.
- An Australian fit-out and refurbishment company changed its name to SHAPE, to coincide with the "best interests" of those involved with their business.
- In June 2016, Finnish translation agency Isis Translations changed its name to Pauhu Ltd. to avoid denial of service attacks and problems with bank and PayPal payments.

== Organisations ==
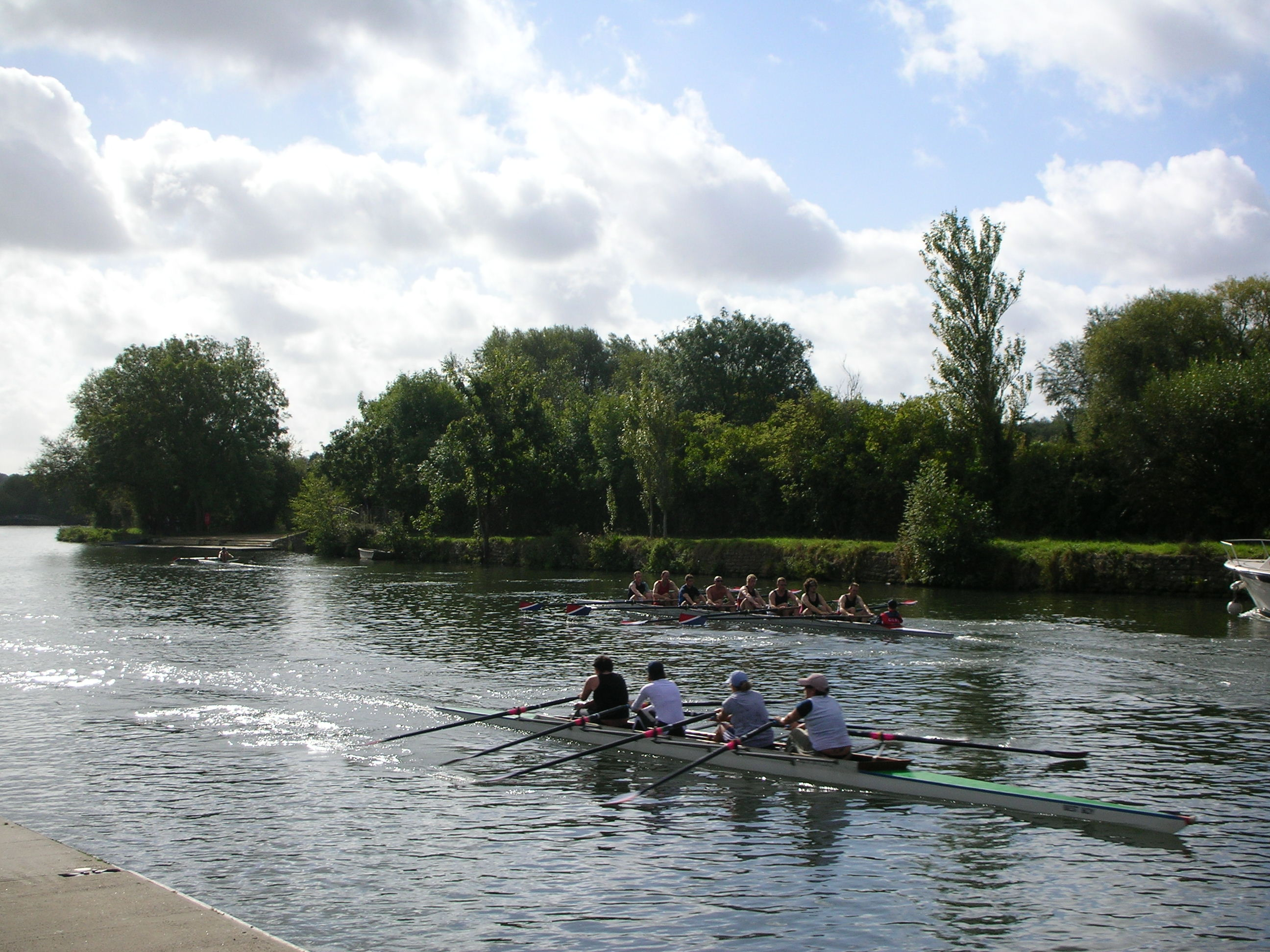
A language school in Oxford was named Isis after the stretch of the River Thames which runs through the city

- In 2014, an organisation in Nova Scotia that aimed on assimilating immigrants — previously known as Immigrant Settlement and Integration Services (ISIS), changed its name to Immigrant Services Association of Nova Scotia (ISANS). Its main concern about the former name was its appropriateness towards clients from Iraq and Syria, where ISIL/ISIS particularly operative in Iraq and Syria.
- The Daughters of Isis, a black women's Masonic auxiliary, changed their name to the Imperial Court in 2014. The Egyptian goddess continues to be their symbol.
- A language school in Oxford — named Isis after the city's stretch of the River Thames, became the Oxford International Education Group (OIEG) in April 2015. Staff said that recruiting from the Middle East was made difficult by the name, and that people searching for their website may be put at risk.
- In 2016, the Association for Information Systems (AIS) changed the pronunciation of its abbreviation of the International Conference on Information Systems (ICIS) premier conference to "I-see-IS".
- In 2016, an international non-profit organisation that responsible for online database of wild animals under human care — previously known as International Species Information System (ISIS), changed its name to Species360.

== Transportation ==
- The former ISIS InterCity train of the Hungarian national railway company MÁV-START — originally named after an Ancient Egyptian goddess — was renamed to Ízisz on 31 August 2015, reflecting the Hungarian spelling of the same word. The train was further renamed to Borostyánkő (lit. "amber" in Hungarian) on 13 December 2015, distancing it completely from its original name.

== Entertainment ==
- The FX animated series Archer, which first aired in 2009, revolves around the fictional International Secret Intelligence Service (ISIS). In 2014, the sixth season of the show began with the characters being told that they now work for the CIA. Merchandise based on the fictional ISIS was withdrawn.
- A French rock band changed their name from Isis Child to Angel's Whisper as the attention on ISIL had overshadowed them on search engines. An American band named Isis, which was disbanded in 2010, changed their Facebook name to "Isis the band" to avoid confusion. Some fans suggested that the band should change their name completely.
- In December 2015, the name of the spaceship browser in the online multiplayer video game EVE Online was changed from "Interbus Ship Identification System" (ISIS) to "Ship Tree".
- Japanese light novel, manga, anime series Infinite Stratos also sometimes sparked controversy because its abbreviated name was "IS" — which sometimes was confused with the Islamic State.
- In the multiplayer online battle arena video game Smite, developer Hi-Rez Studios renamed the playable goddess Isis to her original Ancient Egyptian name, Eset, citing concerns of demonetization on video platforms.
- The character of Zari in the CW series Legends of Tomorrow is based on the DC Comics character Isis, but never takes on the Isis mantle. In an interview with Entertainment Weekly, executive producer Marc Guggenheim cited concerns over association with the Islamic State as the reason for the change.

== Given names ==
- An Australian woman who named her daughter Isis after the ancient Egyptian goddess stated it caused a rift in her family because the name is "now synonymous with terrorism and evil". An American woman named Isis initiated an online petition for the media to stop referring to ISIL as ISIS.
- In April 2015, the World Meteorological Organization removed Isis from its list for the 2016 Pacific hurricane season, replacing it with "Ivette".

== Contested attribution ==
- The British television series Downton Abbey featured a dog named Isis after the ancient Egyptian goddess, (named in commemoration of the shooting location of Highclere Castle, which happened to be the country seat of the Earls of Carnarvon, given the 5th Earl's seminal role in financing the excavation of Tutankhamun's tomb) who became ill with cancer in the show around the same time as other entities sought to distance themselves from ISIL/ISIS. The dog was ultimately replaced with a new one, this time named Tiye, after the eponymous queen of Egypt. While the show's primary director Julian Fellowes acknowledged the connection, lead actor Hugh Bonneville (who plays the role of the dog's owner) repudiated claims that the dog was being killed off due to its name, saying "Anyone who genuinely believes the series five storyline (1924) involving the animal was a reaction to recent world news is a complete berk." ITV called the name an "unfortunate coincidence".

== See also ==
- List of politically motivated renamings
- Names of the Islamic State
- The Isis, an alternative name for the River Thames
- The Isis Magazine
