= List of storms named Isis =

The name Isis was used for six tropical cyclones worldwide: five in the Eastern Pacific Ocean and one in the South-West Indian Ocean.

In the Eastern Pacific Ocean:

- Hurricane Isis (1980) — a Category 2 hurricane that paralleled the coast of Mexico but did not affect any land areas.
- Tropical Storm Isis (1986) — a short-lived tropical storm which stayed at sea.
- Tropical Storm Isis (1992) — a strong tropical storm that remained in the open ocean.
- Hurricane Isis (1998) — a short-lived Category 1 hurricane which became the only landfalling hurricane during the 1998 season, killing 14 in Mexico.
- Hurricane Isis (2004) — a Category 1 hurricane that affected no land areas.

The name Isis was removed from the Eastern Pacific's naming list in 2015 due to its association with the Islamic State of Iraq and the Levant, which was abbreviated as ISIS by global mass media in the mid-2010s. It was replaced by Ivette for the 2016 season.

In the South-West Indian Ocean:

- Severe Tropical Storm Isis (1973) – a relatively strong tropical storm which affected northeastern Madagascar.
