= Hurricane Isis (1998) =

Category 1 Pacific hurricane in 1998

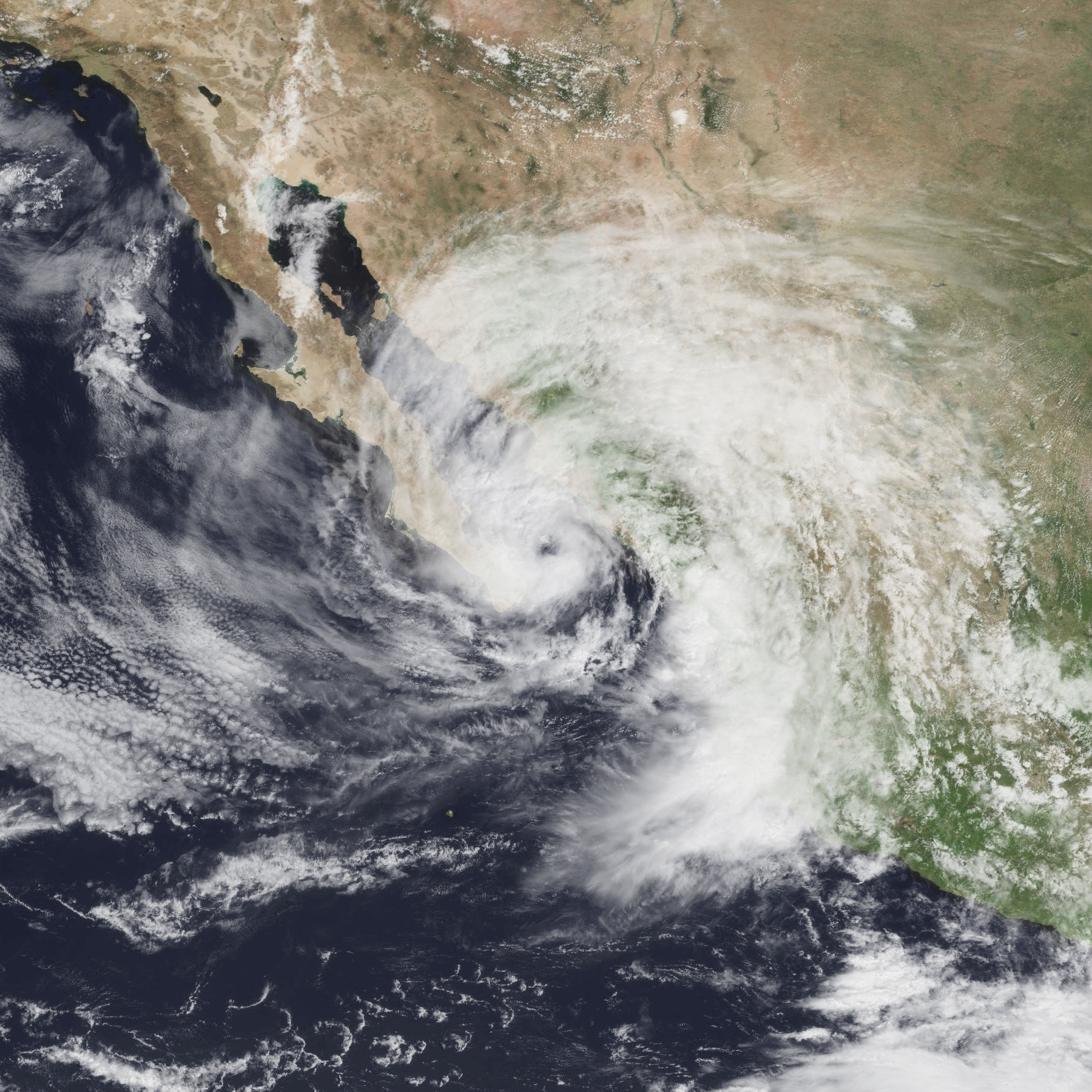
- Hurricane Isis at peak intensity just east of the Baja Peninsula on September 2

Meteorological history
- Formed: September 1, 1998
- Remnant low: September 3, 1998
- Dissipated: September 8, 1998

Category 1 hurricane
- 1-minute sustained (SSHWS/NWS)
- Highest winds: 75 mph (120 km/h)
- Lowest pressure: 988 mbar (hPa); 29.18 inHg

Overall effects
- Fatalities: 14
- Damage: $100 million
- Areas affected: Baja California Peninsula, Northern Pacific coast of Mexico, Southwestern United States, Northwestern United States
- IBTrACS
- Part of the 1998 Pacific hurricane season

Hurricane Isis was the only hurricane to make landfall during the 1998 Pacific hurricane season. The ninth tropical storm and sixth hurricane of the season, Isis developed on September 1 from an interaction between a tropical wave and a large surface circulation to the southwest of Mexico. It moved northward, striking the extreme southeastern portion of the Baja California peninsula before attaining hurricane status in the Gulf of California. Isis made landfall at Topolobampo in the Mexican state of Sinaloa on September 3, and quickly lost its low-level circulation. The remnants persisted for several days before dissipating over the U.S. state of Idaho on September 8.

In Mexico, Isis destroyed over 700 houses and killed 14 people; this is primarily due to its heavy rainfall which peaked at over 20 inches (510 mm) in southern Baja California Sur. The rainfall caused widespread damage to roads and railways, stranding thousands of people. Moisture from the remnants of Isis extended into the southwestern United States, resulting in light rainfall, dozens of traffic accidents, and power outages to thousands of residents in San Diego County, California.

== Meteorological history ==
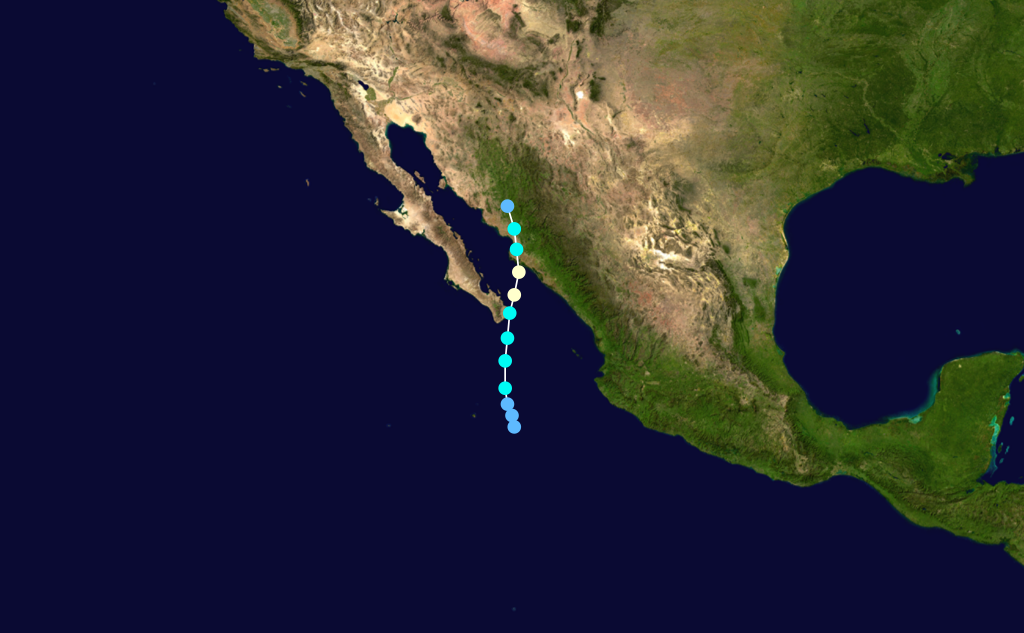
Map plotting the storm's track and intensity, according to the Saffir–Simpson scale Map key Saffir–Simpson scale Tropical depression (≤38 mph, ≤62 km/h) Tropical storm (39–73 mph, 63–118 km/h) Category 1 (74–95 mph, 119–153 km/h) Category 2 (96–110 mph, 154–177 km/h) Category 3 (111–129 mph, 178–208 km/h) Category 4 (130–156 mph, 209–251 km/h) Category 5 (≥157 mph, ≥252 km/h) Unknown Storm type Tropical cyclone Subtropical cyclone Extratropical cyclone, remnant low, tropical disturbance, or monsoon depression

A tropical wave moved off the coast of Africa on August 14, 1998. It traveled westward, and on August 19 spawned the tropical depression that eventually became Hurricane Bonnie. The wave continued westward across the Atlantic Ocean and Caribbean Sea, and crossed Central America into the eastern Pacific Ocean on August 25. The wave decreased its forward speed while approaching a large low-level circulation over southern Mexico. A broad area of disturbed weather formed in association with the wave and the low-level circulation, and after persisting for several days developed a smaller low-level circulation on August 29 about 575 miles (925 km) south-southeast of Cabo San Lucas. On August 31, the two primary areas of convection were well-removed from the center. By early on September 1, despite a lack of convective organization, the low-cloud circulation was sufficiently well-defined that the National Hurricane Center designated it as Tropical Depression Ten-E, or the tenth tropical depression of the season, about 350 miles (560 km) south of Cabo San Lucas. In real time, the National Hurricane Center first upgraded the system 21 hours later.

The depression initially tracked slowly north-northwestward and gradually strengthened. Late on September 1 it intensified into Tropical Storm Isis while located about 200 miles (320 km) south of Cabo San Lucas. Upon becoming a tropical storm, the deep convection was not organized, causing one forecaster to describe Isis as a large monsoon-like system. A mid-level trough extending southward from the Arizona/California border caused the storm to accelerate northward. The storm quickly strengthened; six hours after Isis became a tropical storm it reached winds of 70 mph (110 km/h). Very deep, symmetrical convection developed over the poorly defined center of circulation while banding features began to form, although ill-defined outflow and land interaction with the Baja California Peninsula initially prevented further strengthening. At 1200 UTC on September 2, Isis made landfall on extreme southeastern Baja California Sur as a strong tropical storm, and subsequently turned to the north-northeast.

After entering the Gulf of California, an eye began to become apparent on visible satellite imagery, and it is estimated Isis attained hurricane status late on September 2. Continuing northward, it struck Topolobampo in the state of Sinaloa early on September 3 as a minimal hurricane. Isis weakened to a tropical storm a few hours after landfall, and subsequent to turning to the north-northwest the low-level circulation dissipated over Sierra Madre Occidental. The remnants entered southern Arizona on September 4 and tracked around an upper-level low. After entering Nevada on September 5, the remnants of Isis passed into Oregon, before dissipating over Idaho on September 8.

== Preparations ==
Coinciding with the National Hurricane Center's first advisory on Isis, the government of Mexico issued a tropical storm warning from Dolores to Puerto Cortés along the Baja California Peninsula. This helped some of the residents get an early start. Early on September 2, the warning was extended from Santa Rosalía to Punta Abreojos, while an additional tropical storm warning was issued from El Dorado to Guaymas. After Isis became a hurricane, officials issued a hurricane warning from Dolores to Punta San Gabriel on the Baja California Peninsula and from El Dorado to Bahía Kino on the mainland.

In Baja California Sur, 2,500 residents were evacuated to emergency shelters. Officials closed the port at Mazatlán and recommended fisherman along the coast of the Gulf of California to remain at port. Officials set up 49 shelters on the mainland to provide evacuees with food, clothing and medical attention. The Mexican Army assisted residents in evacuation, and the Navy provided medical aid and assistance to boat owners. More than 24,000 people were sheltered during the storm.

== Impact ==
=== Mexico ===
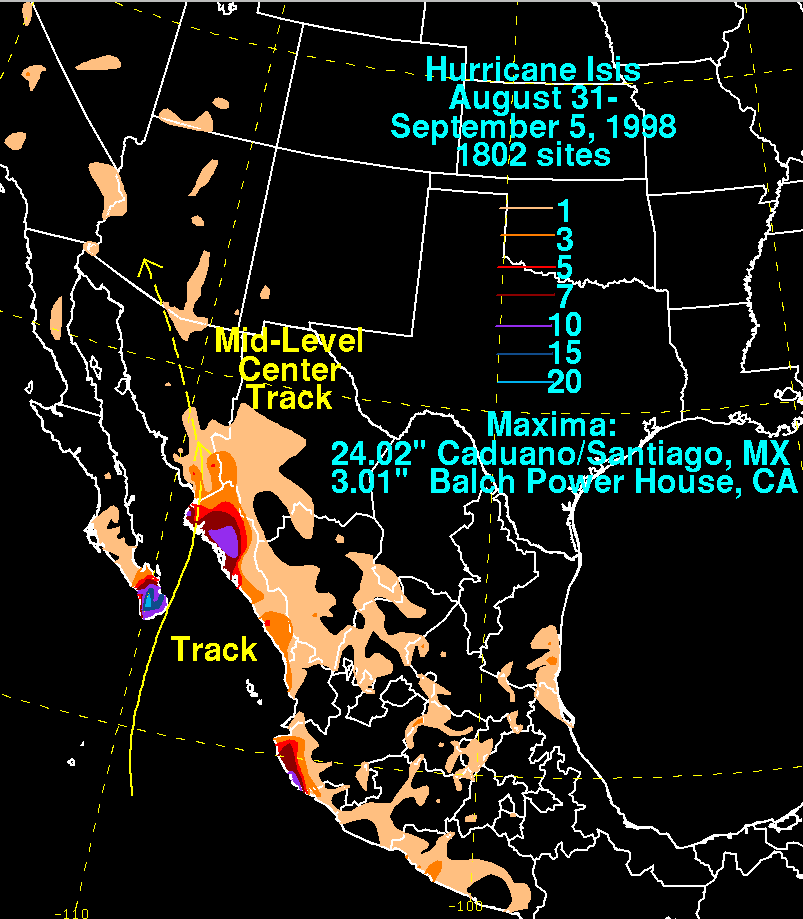
Rainfall Summary for Hurricane Isis

Isis first affected Baja California Sur on September 2 as a tropical storm. Shortly after making landfall, a weather reporting station at San José del Cabo recorded sustained winds of 26 mph (42 km/h), and gusts reaching up to 46 mph (74 km/h). A station on the Islas Marías also reported sustained winds of 54 mph (87 km/h). The winds left widespread areas without power or telephone. The storm produced heavy rainfall in the southern portion of the peninsula, including a 24‑hour total of 12.99 inches (330 mm) at Los Cabos and a peak rainfall total of 24.02 inches (610 mm) at Santiago. A married couple was killed after attempting to cross a flooded stream in Los Cabos. Initially, reports indicated a family was missing in La Paz, though they were later proven false. Flooding from the storm closed all roads to the north of Los Cabos and caused damage to the roads in the area. Mudslides from the rain buried at least 120 cars in the area.

Rainfall reached over 10 inches (250 mm) in the coastal region of Jalisco, and lighter amounts of precipitation extended further to the southeast and northeast. One person was reported missing in Jalisco. The heaviest 24‑hour rainfall total in the state of Sinaloa was 8.66 inches (220 mm), whereas in Sonora a maximum of 4.72 inches (120 mm) of rain were recorded. Strong waves from the hurricane struck the Mexican mainland, with four people injured at Mazatlán when their boat washed onto rocks and was destroyed. Rainfall from the storm flooded 15 communities in and around Mazatlán, and the Army assisted residents in emergency evacuations. At Los Mochis, near the point where Isis made landfall, the hurricane resulted in the destruction of 300 homes, as well as in seven fatalities. Throughout the city, strong winds from the hurricane downed street posts, tree limbs, and power lines, with one person seriously injured from a downed power line. Additionally, the roof of a gas station collapsed from the winds. More than 1,200 bus passengers in Sinaloa were stranded due to road closures from the hurricane, including the closure of the coastal highway in the southern portion of Sinaloa as it had been washed out due to floodwaters. Rainfall from the storm caused severe river flooding in some locations, and authorities advised those living along the Fuerte River to be prepared for a possible evacuation. The winds from Isis left about 120,000 people in the municipality of Ahome without power.

Throughout Mexico, the passage of Hurricane Isis resulted in 14 deaths and the loss of 769 homes, with property damage estimates totaling over $5 million (1998 USD, 50 million 1998 MXN, $6.3 million 2007 USD). According to a speech by President Ernesto Zedillo, Isis damaged the water systems in 173 localities; it also damaged 154 primary schools and nine high schools, minor in most cases, causing most schools to be closed for around a week. A total of 730 miles (1,170 km) of railroad track was damaged by mudslides or flooding, with one bridge entirely destroyed and another four damaged.

=== United States ===
Thunderstorms from the remnants of Isis dropped more than two inches (51 mm) of rainfall across southern Arizona, resulting in some flash flood warnings and flooding on roadways. The heaviest precipitation fell across the Santa Catalina and Rincon Mountains near Tucson, which saw precipitation amounts of up to three inches (76 mm). Otherwise, no flooding was reported in the Tucson area, and the Tucson International Airport reported only 1.1 inches (28 mm) as a result of the storm.

The moisture extended into southern California and produced moderate precipitation across the region. Bakersfield reported a one-day rainfall record on September 4 with 0.23 inches (5.8 mm) of precipitation, breaking the previous record of 0.17 inches (4.3 mm) set in 1963. Rainfall amounts at Frazier Park peaked at 1.53 inches (39 mm). Agricultural losses, primarily from vintners and raisin growers, rose up to $5 million in damage (1998 USD, $6.33 million 2007 USD), either directly due to rain or indirectly due to the additional steps to treat the increase in fungus activity on produce. Slick roads from the rain resulted in nearly 80 traffic accidents in San Diego County, ranging from fender benders to moderate injuries. Thunderstorms from the remnants of Isis damaged a San Diego Gas & Electric substation at Kearny Mesa, leaving 10,000 customers without power; the outage was short lived and completely restored within two hours. About 1,000 homes and businesses were temporarily without power in Escondido, and another 2,700 customers lost electricity in Rancho Bernardo. Rainfall in and around San Diego reached a maximum of 0.5 inches (13 mm) at La Mesa. Heavy clouds from Isis produced scattered rainfall and temporary relief to severe heat conditions in the Los Angeles area.

Moisture from the remnants of Isis spread across the southwestern United States, and rainfall reached over 0.75 inches (19 mm) in Nevada and Utah. Low-level moisture dissipated as it continued inland, due to dry air, although upper-level moisture produced light rain across the Northwestern United States; Pocatello, Idaho recorded 0.59 inches (15 mm), while Missoula, Montana recorded 0.39 inches (9.9 mm).

== Aftermath ==
Aid programs began immediately after Isis moved ashore and dissipated to provide support to the affected population. The Comisión Nacional del Agua distributed 1.6 million U.S. gallons (1.3 million imp gal/6 million L) of water and provided repair equipment to the 173 localities whose water systems were damaged. More than 650 health workers worked to combat the spread of diseases, including monitoring sanitary conditions of water and foods, and sprayed nearly 9,900 acres (40 km^{2}) of land to prevent the breeding of mosquitoes. The force also disinfected more than 6,600 latrines and removed more than 850 short tons (770 t) of sewage to prevent the spread of epidemic. No medical-related deaths occurred as a result of this attention.

Twenty-four hours after the passage of the hurricane, workers had restored power to 70% of the affected residents in Sinaloa, and by six days after the storm, electrical service was completely restored. The damage to the federal highway between Culiacán and Los Mochis along the coastal region of Sinaloa was restored about 48 hours after the passage of the hurricane. The rehabilitation of the agricultural infrastructure began immediately, and most of the drainage networks were repaired by about two weeks after the hurricane. About half of the damaged railways were repaired by about a month after the storm. The total cost for reconstruction and aid amounted to about $18.5 million (1998 USD, 175 million 1998 MXN$, 36.5 million in 2026 USD), about 94% from federal funds and the rest from state funding. A portion of the funding was allocated to assist the reconstruction of destroyed houses.

== See also ==
- List of Baja California Peninsula hurricanes
- Other tropical cyclones named Isis
- Tropical cyclone rainfall climatology
