= Libeert =

Belgian chocolate company

- Formerly: Italo Suisse (1923–2013); ISIS Chocolates (2013–2014)
- Company type: Private
- Industry: Food processing
- Founded: 1923, Izegem
- Founder: Joseph Dequeker
- Headquarters: Av. des Châteaux 107A, 7780 Comines-Warneton, Belgium
- Number of locations: 1
- Area served: Worldwide
- Products: Woolie, Mr Nibbles, Deli Dino, Rudolf, Sinterklaas, Sinaas, Speculoos, Caffe Latte
- Number of employees: ~200
- Website: www.libeert.com

Libeert (previously known as Italo Suisse and ISIS) is a Belgian chocolate producer that was founded by Joseph Dequeker in 1923. The company produces more than 5,000 tons of chocolate annually, with a revenue of roughly €35 million.

== History ==
=== Early years ===
After visiting Italy and Switzerland and learning about chocolate artisanship, Joseph Dequeker founded Italo Suisse in 1923 in Izegem, Belgium. Supposedly, many locals knew of it as the "Het Chocoladefabriekske" ("The Little Chocolate Factory" in Dutch). In the 1930s, the operation was moved slightly westward from Izegem to Roeselare.

=== Location move ===
At one point, Libeert moved its headquarters southward into the border municipality of Comines-Warneton.

=== Name changes ===
In 2013, as Italo Suisse, the company changed its name to ISIS, an acronym of the previous name repeated twice and after the Egyptian goddess Isis, as people mistook them as an Italian or Swiss company due to their ambiguous name. However, when the Islamic State gained international attention, the company suffered a drop in sales in the Anglophone World, causing them to lose roughly between €50,000 and €100,000. In 2014, they issued the new name of Libeert, after the family that owns the company.
