= 1996 Pacific typhoon season =

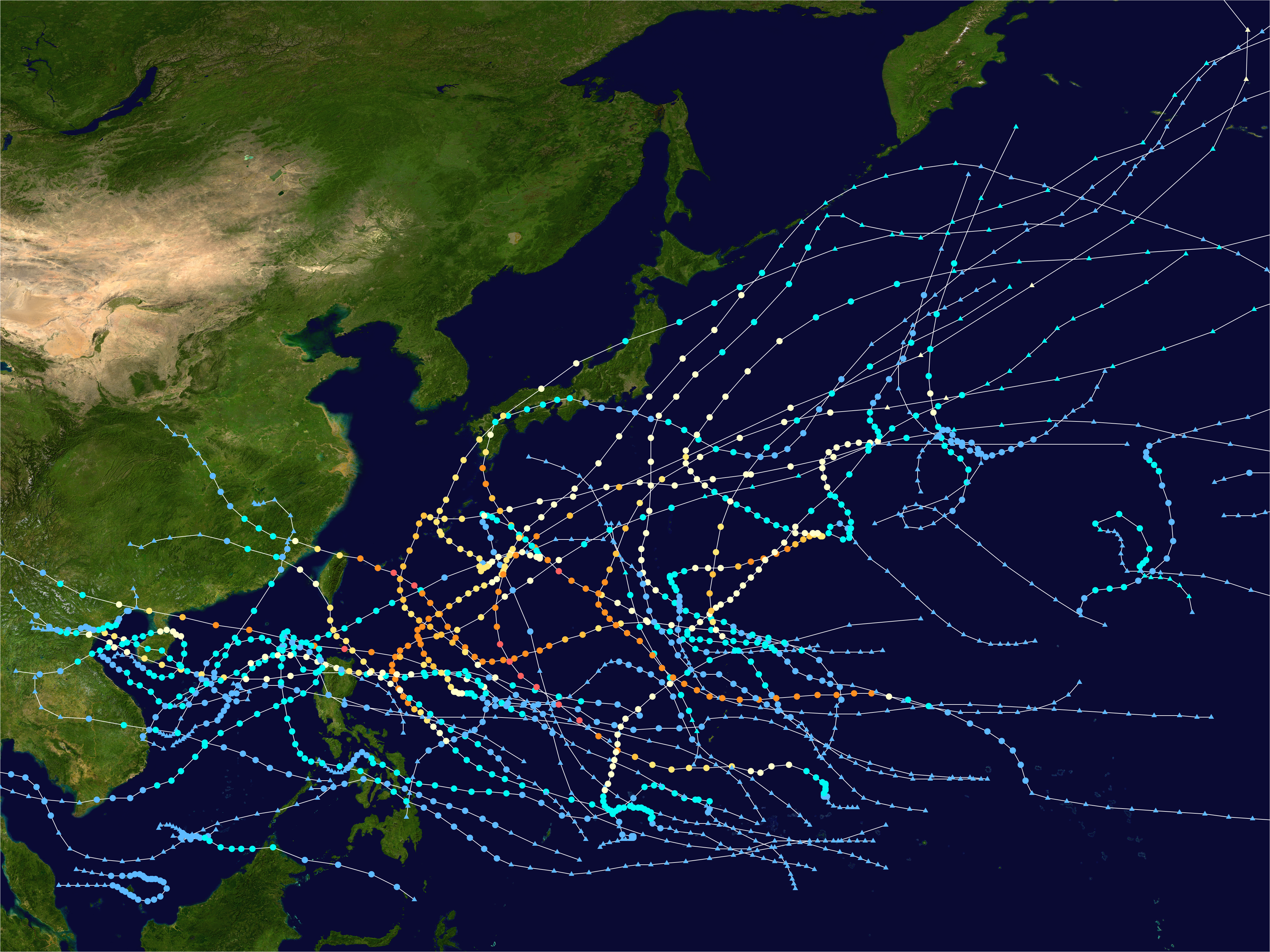
- Season summary map

Seasonal boundaries
- First system formed: January 12, 1996
- Last system dissipated: December 29, 1996

Strongest storm
- Name: Herb
  - Maximum winds: 175 km/h (110 mph) (10-minute sustained)
  - Lowest pressure: 925 hPa (mbar)

Seasonal statistics
- Total depressions: 51, 1 unofficial
- Total storms: 29, 1 unofficial
- Typhoons: 16
- Very strong typhoons: 7
- Violent typhoons: 0
- ACE: 416.5 units
- Total fatalities: 1,829 total
- Total damage: $8.5 billion (1996 USD)

Related articles
- 1996 Atlantic hurricane season; 1996 Pacific hurricane season; 1996 North Indian Ocean cyclone season

The 1996 Pacific typhoon season was a very active typhoon season which featured 30 tropical storms, 16 typhoons and six super typhoons, despite the presence of a La Niña. Although the season ran year-round, most tropical cyclones in the northwestern Pacific Ocean form between May and December. The first storm, named Ann, developed on April 3. The final storm, named Greg, dissipated on December 27.

The scope of this article is limited to the Pacific Ocean north of the equator and west of the International Date Line. Storms forming east of the date line are called hurricanes (see 1996 Pacific hurricane season). Tropical Storms in the western pacific basin were assigned names by the Joint Typhoon Warning Center, and tropical depressions were given a "W" suffix after their numerical designation. Additionally, tropical depressions that formed within or entered the Philippine area of responsibility were assigned local names by PAGASA.

== Systems ==
=== Tropical Storm 01W (Asiang) ===
- Tropical storm (JMA)
- Tropical depression (SSHWS)
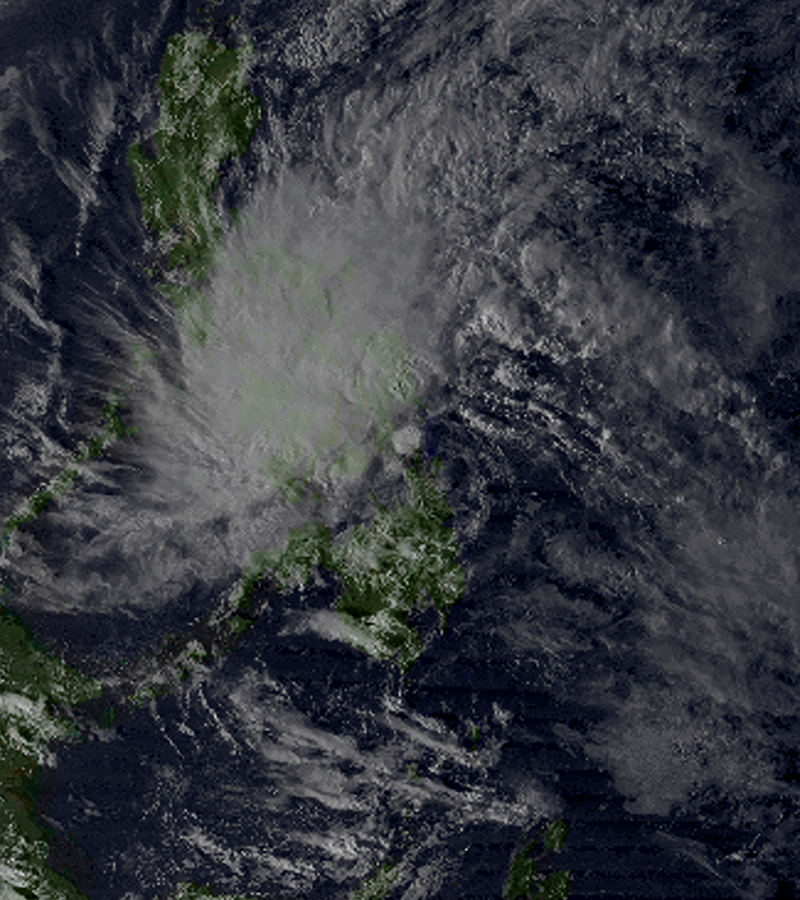
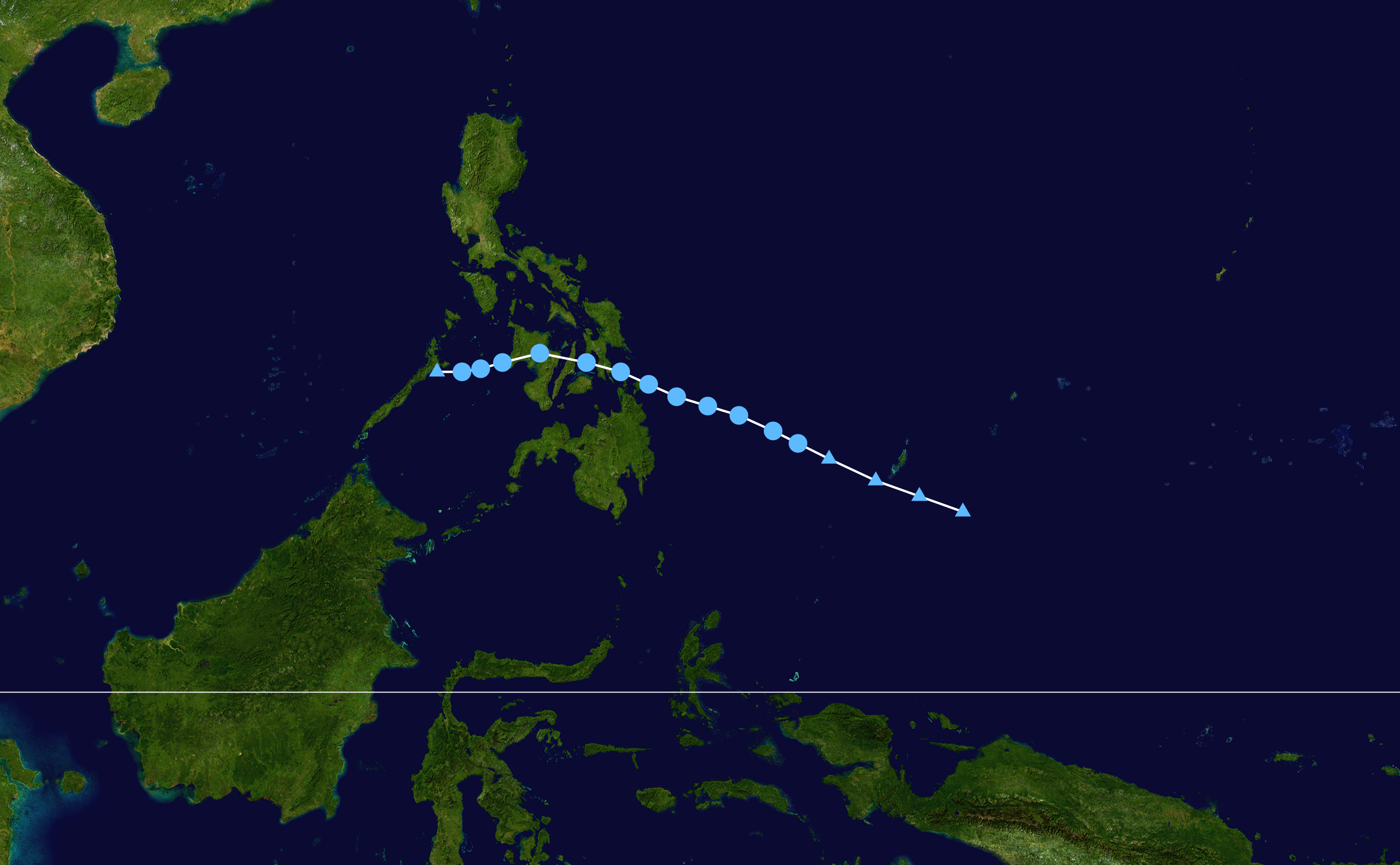
- Duration: February 28 – March 1
- Peak intensity: 65 km/h (40 mph) (10-min); 998 hPa (mbar)

On February 23, a large area of convection developed south of the Philippine Sea. The convection developed into a low pressure area and was at first bombarded by wind shear, but conditions soon turned favorable which allowed it to strengthen rapidly on February 27 before becoming a Tropical depression later that day. The JMA upgraded 01W into a Tropical Storm before it drifted over the Philippines on February 29, and weakened slightly due to land interaction. On March 1, a cold front brought cold, dry air and vertical wind shear which pushed the system south caused the system's low level circulation center to become exposed. The exposed remnants of 01W continued to drift south, before being completely absorbed by the Intertropical Convergence Zone.

=== Tropical Storm Ann (Biring) ===
- Tropical storm (JMA)
- Tropical storm (SSHWS)
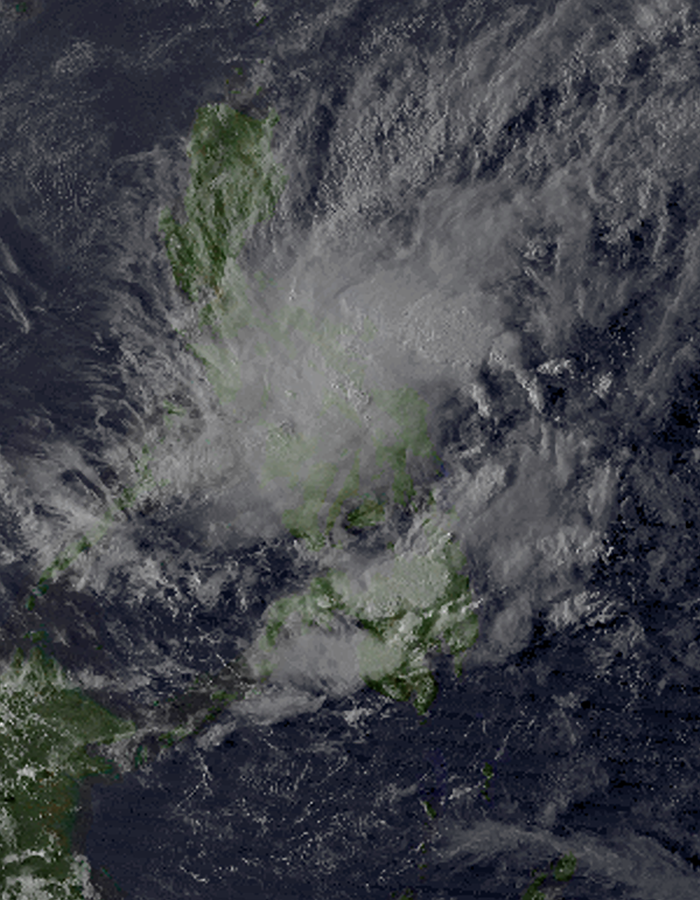
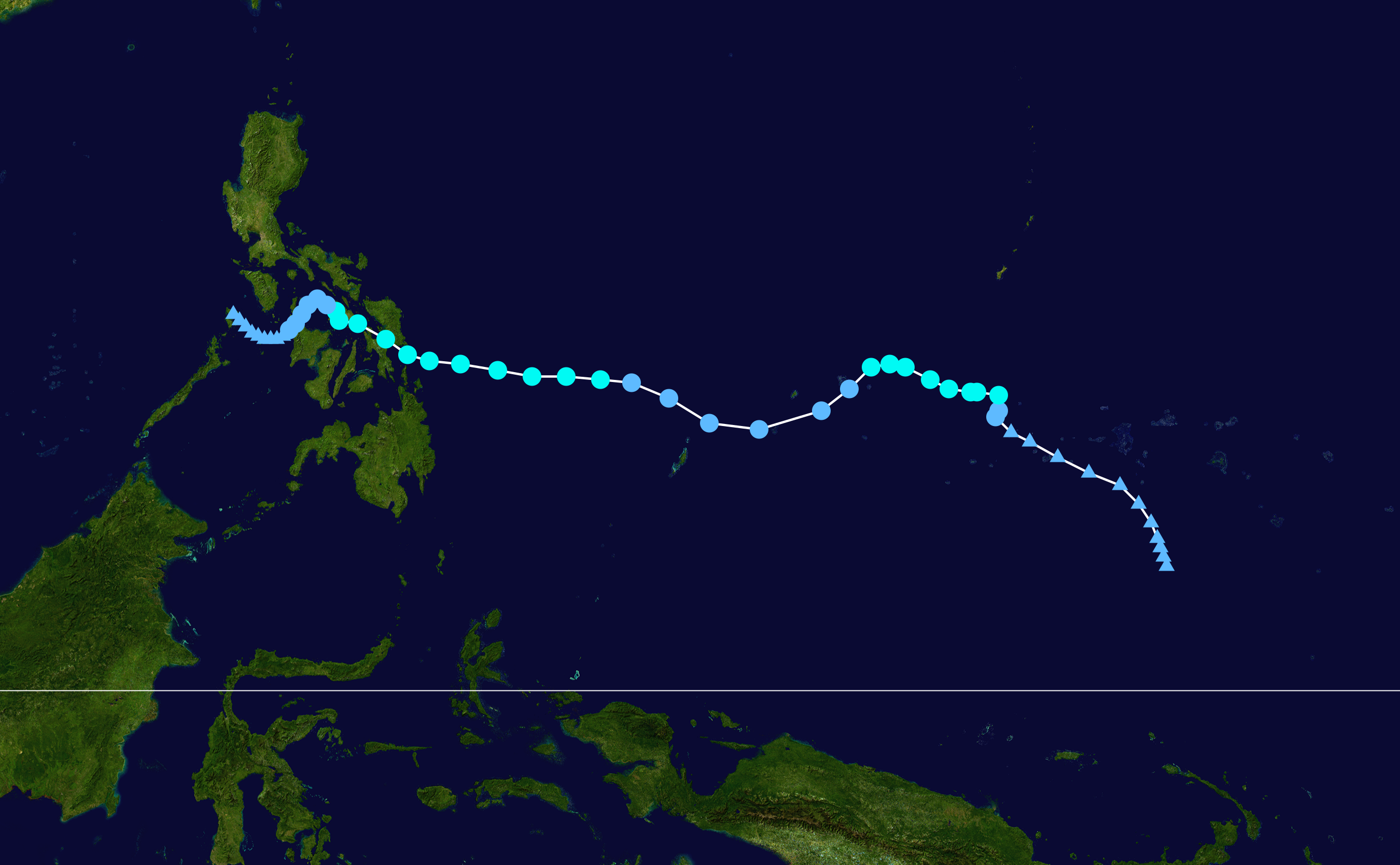
- Duration: April 1 – April 10
- Peak intensity: 65 km/h (40 mph) (10-min); 1000 hPa (mbar)

A low pressure area formed in the Western Pacific by March 27th. Days later, it became a tropical depression, then a tropical storm. A day later, it was named Ana by the Japan Meteorological Agency. By April 4-5 it entered the Philippine Area of Responsibility, and PAGASA named the storm Biring. It made a landfall in the Visayas region of Tacloban. One report stated it caused damages to homes, but could not estimate the damages. Another report by authorities estimated 2 deaths, and some reports of missing people who were not later found.

=== Tropical Depression 03W ===
- Tropical depression (JMA)
- Tropical depression (SSHWS)
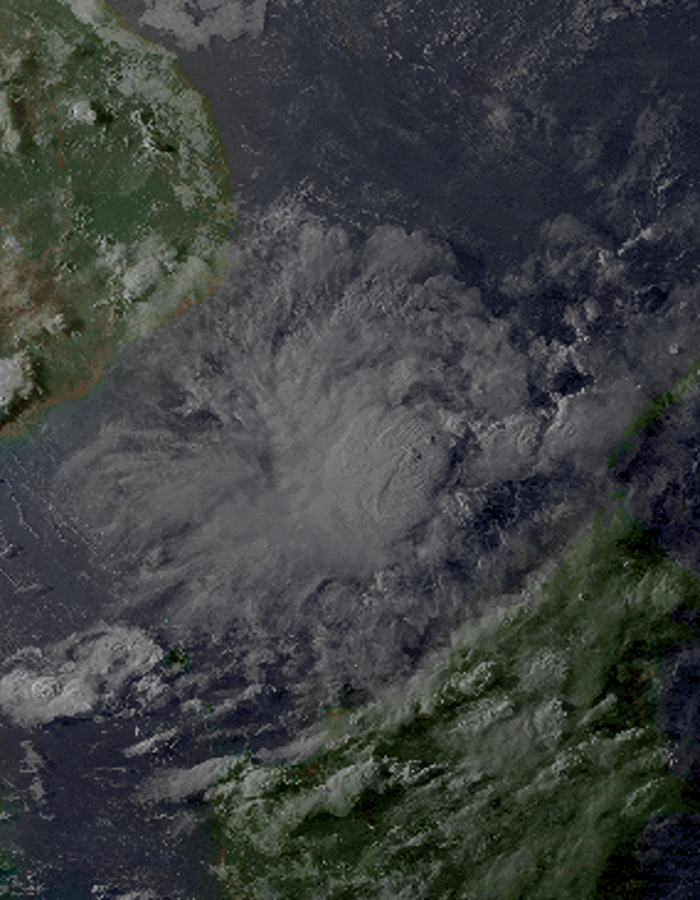
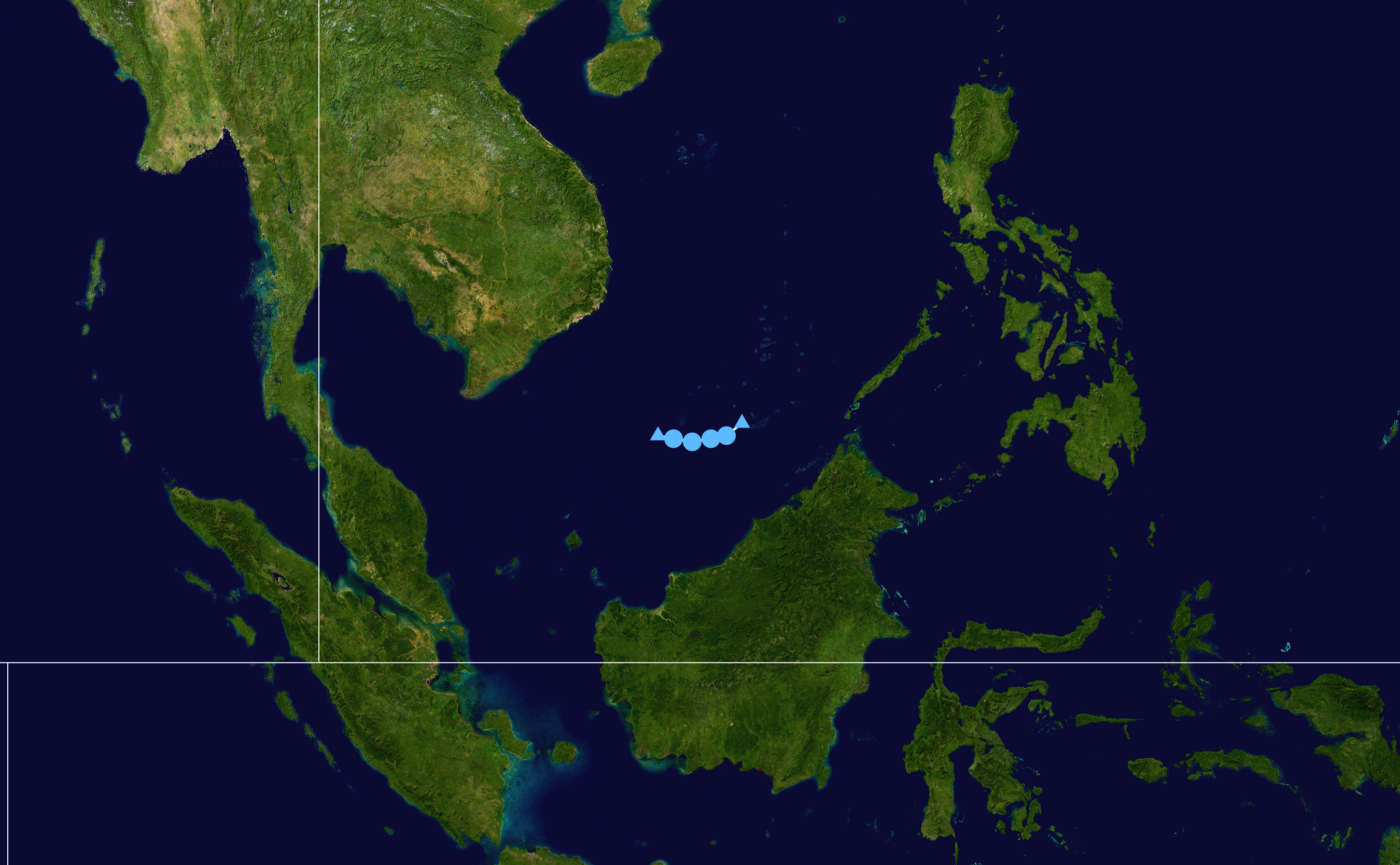
- Duration: April 25 – April 26
- Peak intensity: 45 km/h (30 mph) (1-min); 1004 hPa (mbar)

Tropical Depression 03W was a short-lived tropical cyclone that formed in the South China Sea during April 1996. It existed for only a brief period, from April 25th to 26th. While its lifespan was short, it was a part of an active typhoon season in the region. Despite its limited duration, it contributed to the overall weather patterns and maritime conditions in the area during that time.

=== Typhoon Bart (Konsing) ===
- Very strong typhoon (JMA)
- Category 4 typhoon (SSHWS)
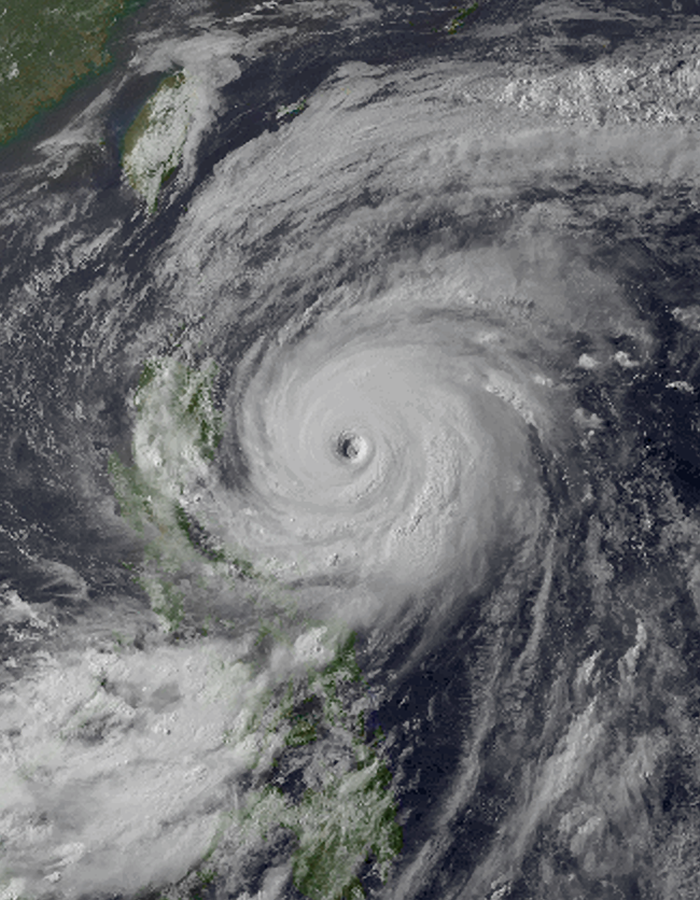
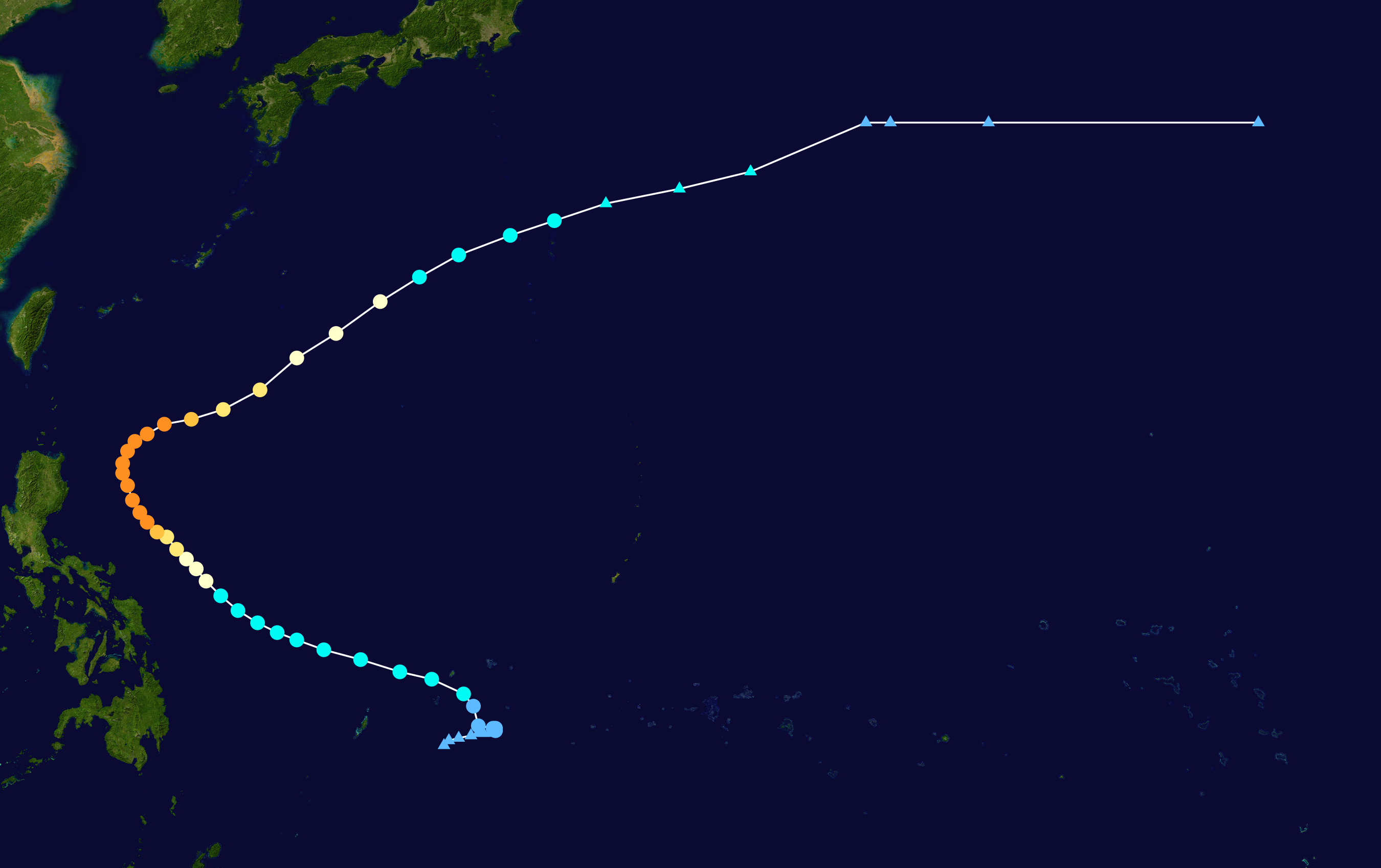
- Duration: May 8 – May 18
- Peak intensity: 175 km/h (110 mph) (10-min); 930 hPa (mbar)

Typhoon Bart, also known as Konsing, was a tropical cyclone that formed in the Western Pacific Ocean in 1996. It developed on May 8 and intensified into a typhoon on May 12. While it didn't make landfall, it was a significant storm that tracked northwestward across the open ocean. Bart eventually weakened into an extratropical cyclone on May 18.

=== Tropical Storm Cam (Ditang) ===
- Tropical storm (JMA)
- Tropical storm (SSHWS)
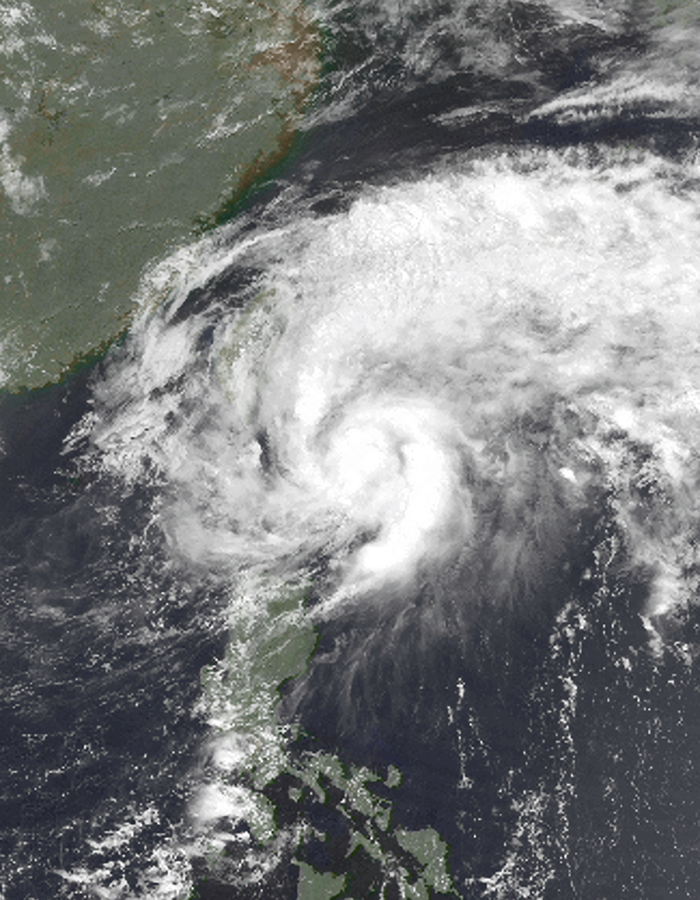
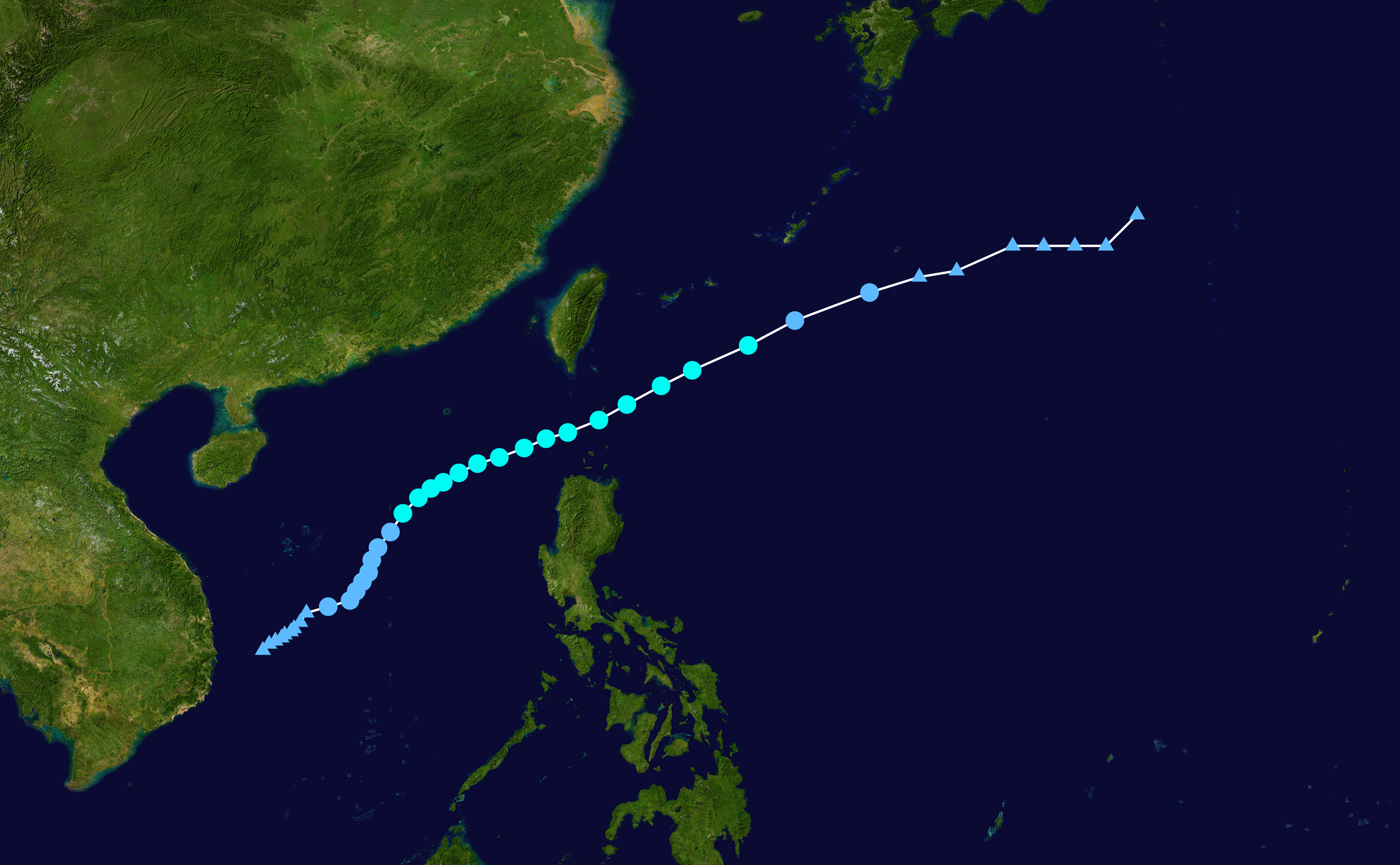
- Duration: May 18 – May 24
- Peak intensity: 75 km/h (45 mph) (10-min); 994 hPa (mbar)

Cam developed over the South China Sea on May 18. The cyclone headed northeastward to east-northeastward and dissipated over the Pacific Ocean on May 23.

=== Typhoon Dan ===
- Typhoon (JMA)
- Category 1 typhoon (SSHWS)
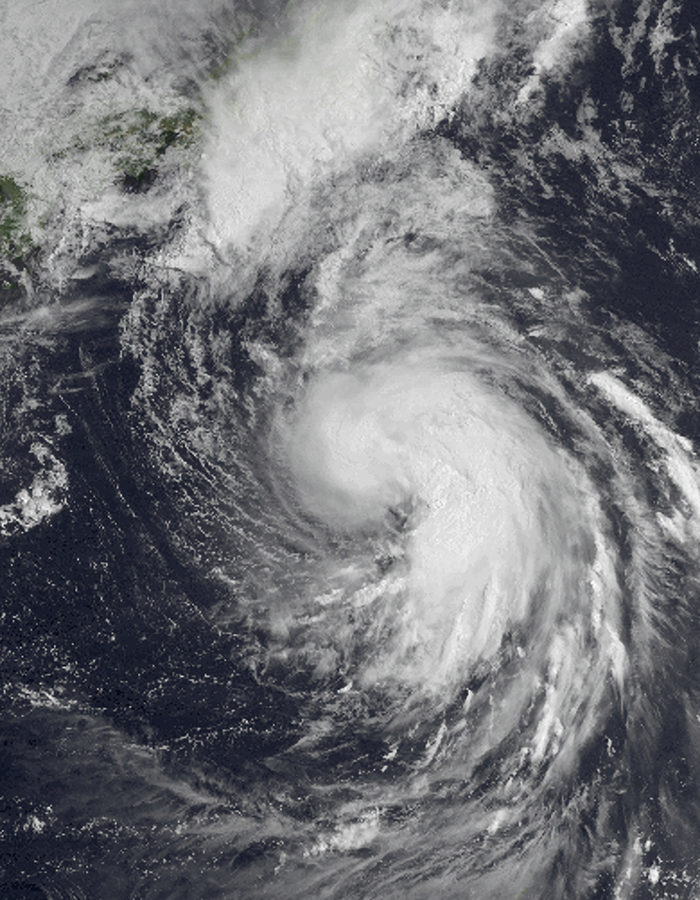
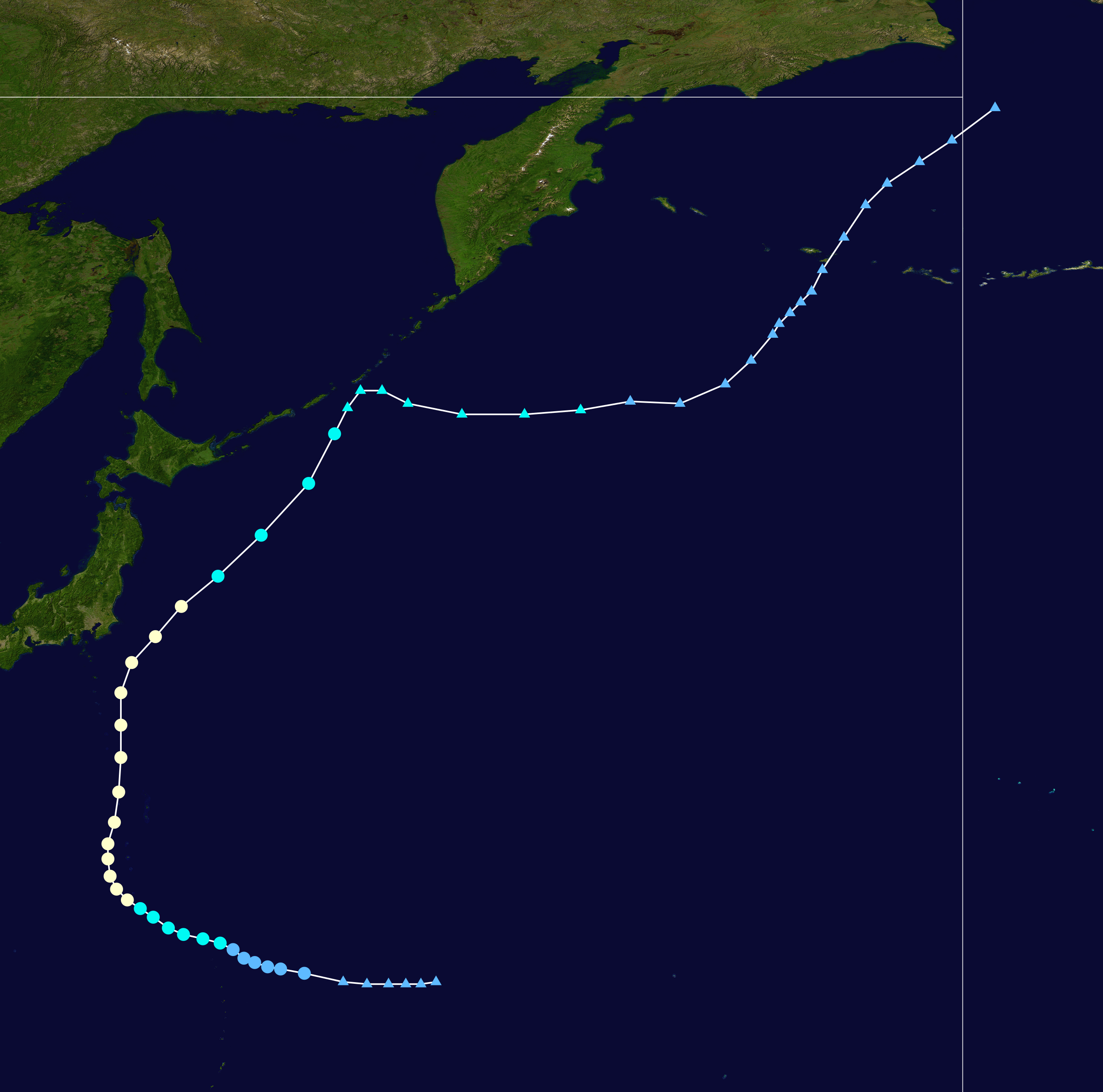
- Duration: July 5 – July 12
- Peak intensity: 120 km/h (75 mph) (10-min); 970 hPa (mbar)

Typhoon Dan, designated as the sixth tropical storm of the 1996 Pacific typhoon season, originated from a disturbance over the open Western Pacific Ocean on July 5, 1996. Classified as a tropical depression by the Joint Typhoon Warning Center (JTWC), it tracked west-northwestward under the influence of subtropical steering currents. Within 48 hours, the system intensified into a tropical storm and further organized into a typhoon by July 7.

Dan reached its peak intensity on July 8–9, with 10-minute sustained winds of 120 km/h (75 mph) and a central pressure of 970 hPa 1. During this period, the typhoon followed a characteristic parabolic path common to mid-summer Pacific systems. It maintained typhoon status for approximately 36 hours while moving northwestward across the Philippine Sea, though its core remained entirely over water, avoiding major landmasses 814.

By July 10, increasing vertical wind shear and cooler ocean temperatures initiated weakening. Dan decelerated to a tropical storm by July 11 near the Ryukyu Islands, Japan. The system subsequently turned northeastward, transitioning into an extratropical cyclone by July 12 before dissipating over the open North Pacific.

Dan caused no documented land impacts or casualties, as its path remained oceanic throughout its lifecycle.

=== Typhoon Eve ===
- Very strong typhoon (JMA)
- Category 5 super typhoon (SSHWS)
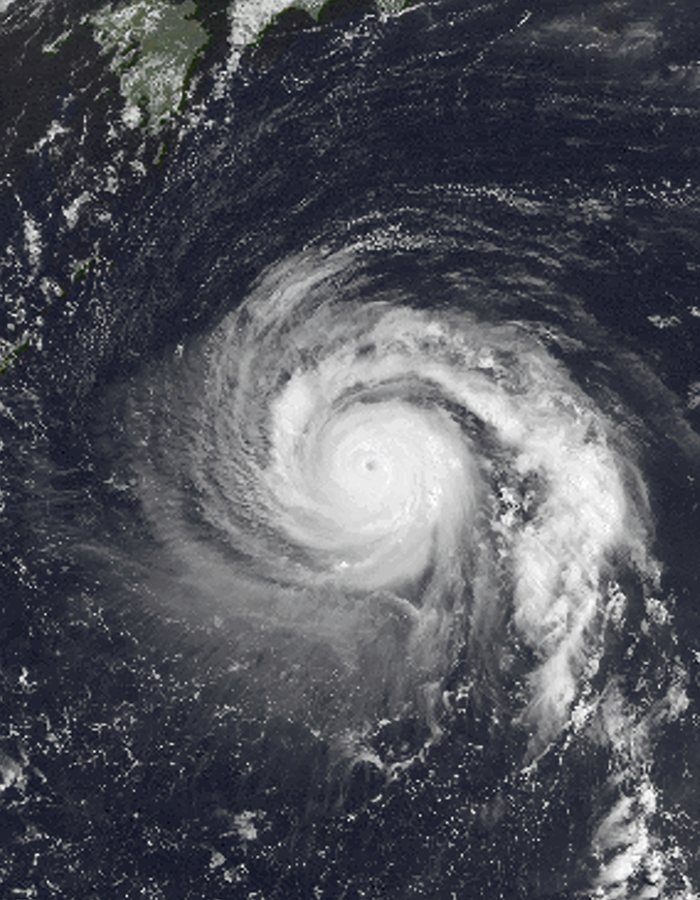
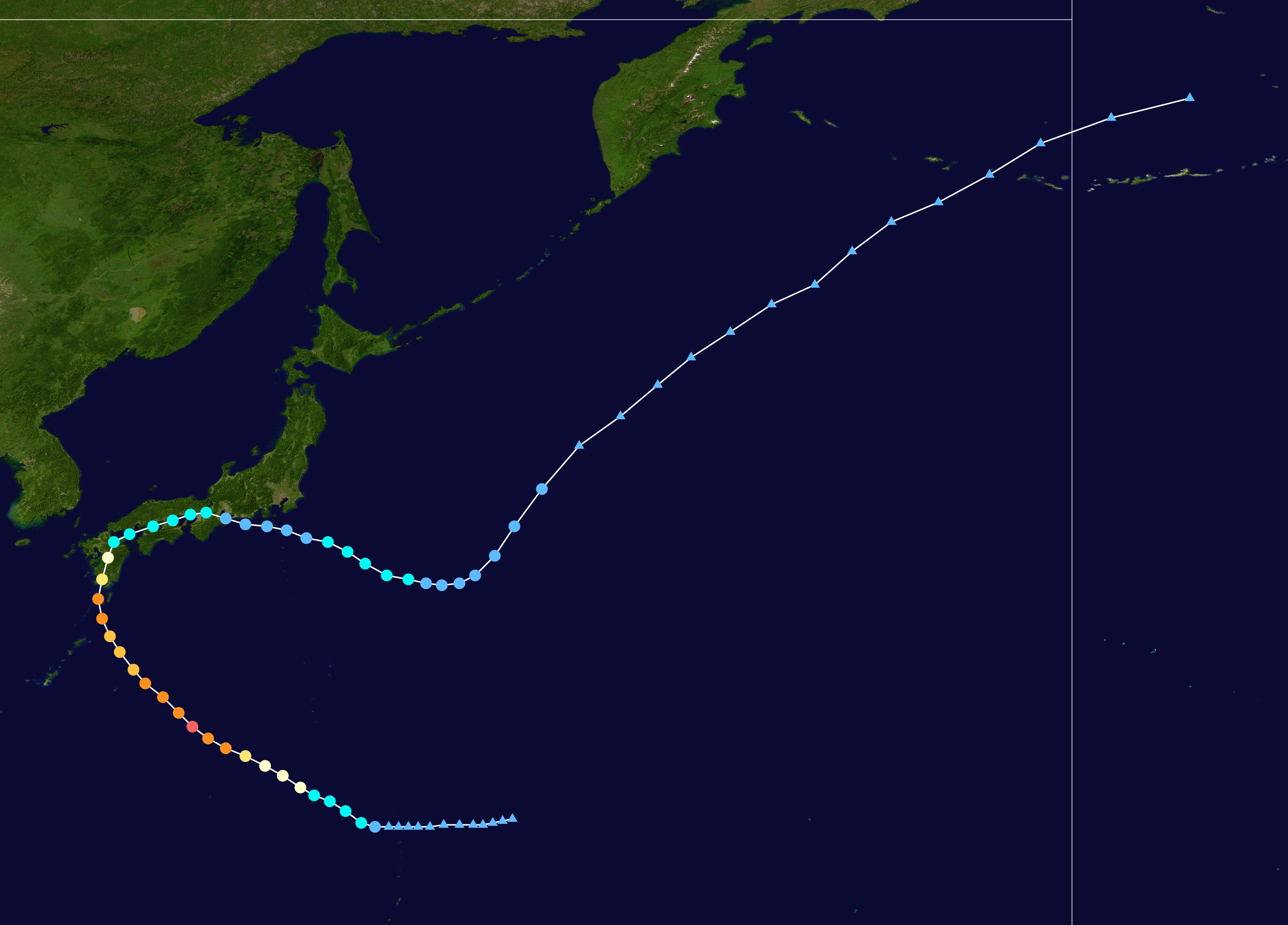
- Duration: July 13 – July 24
- Peak intensity: 155 km/h (100 mph) (10-min); 930 hPa (mbar)

A Tropical Upper Tropospheric Trough spawned Tropical Depression 7W on July 10 over the open Western Pacific. It tracked generally west-northwestward, strengthening to a tropical storm on the 14th. On the 15th Eve became a typhoon, which was followed by a period of explosive deepening to a 100 mph Typhoon, with a pressure drop of 40 mb from early on the 15th to early on the 16th. An eyewall replacement cycle weakened Eve to a 95 mph typhoon, but as the outer eyewall contracted, the storm again reached wind speeds of 97 mph before hitting southern Japan on the 18th. Rapidly weakening over the mountains, Eve turned eastward over the islands and the last warning was issued on the 20th. It restrengthened to a tropical storm east of Japan, and continued northeastward until dissipation on the 27th. Eve, despite being a Category 4 at landfall, caused no reported deaths and only 9 injuries. However, it destroyed 2,361 homes and damaged another 933 homes. Total damage in Japan is estimated at ¥78.8 billion (US$724 million).

=== Severe Tropical Storm Frankie (Edeng) ===
- Severe tropical storm (JMA)
- Category 2 typhoon (SSHWS)
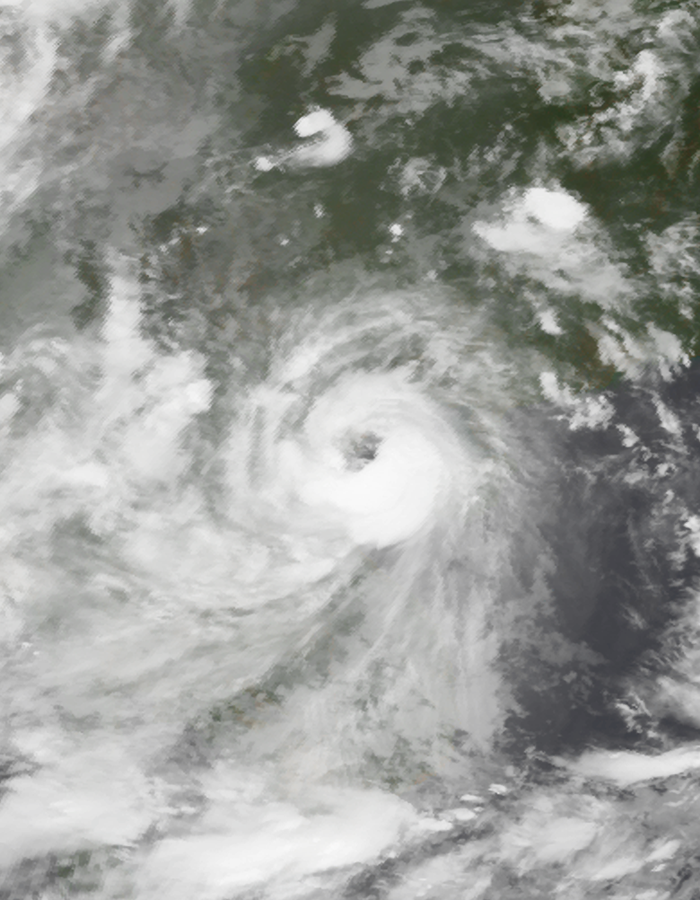
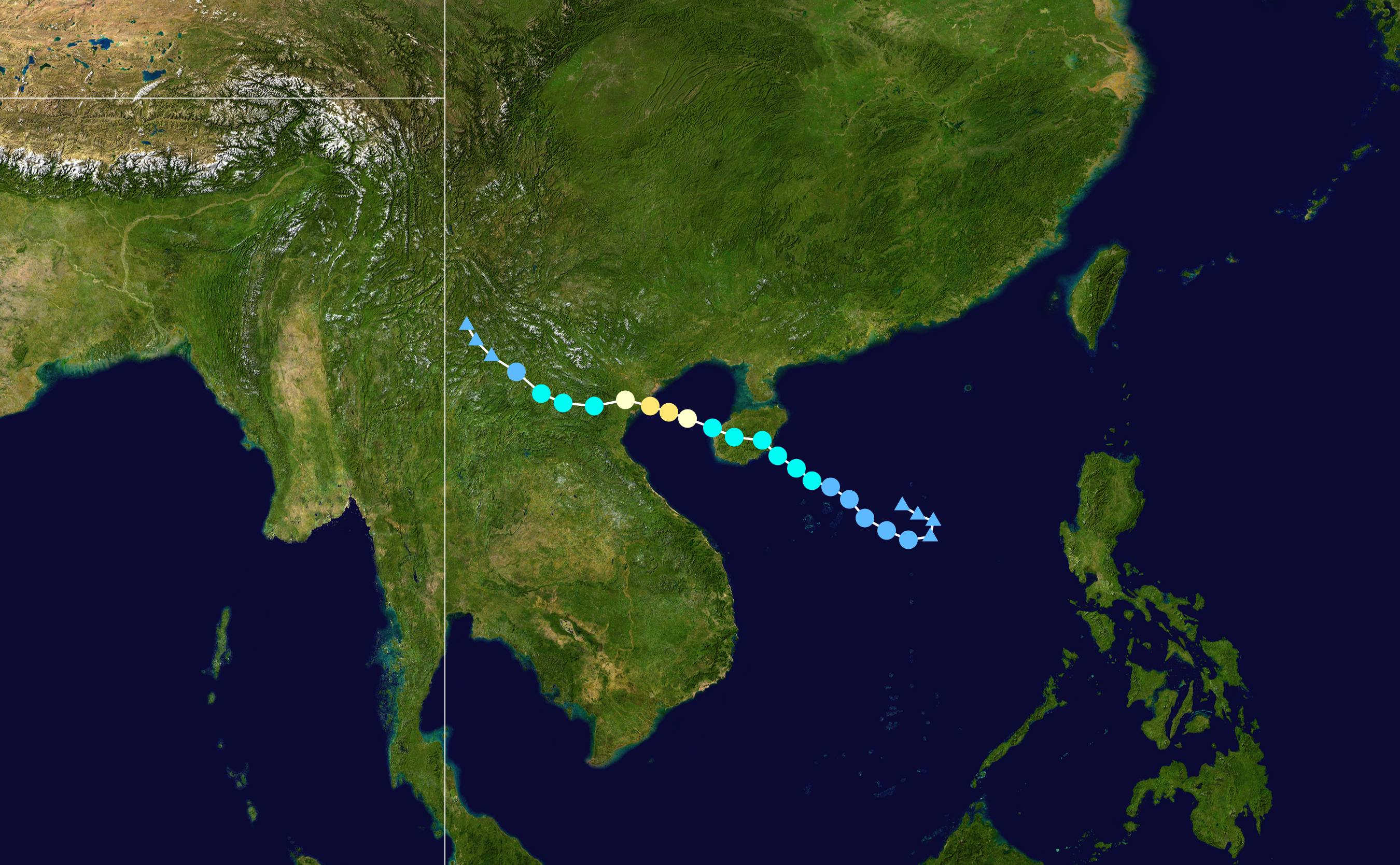
- Duration: July 20 – July 25
- Peak intensity: 95 km/h (60 mph) (10-min); 975 hPa (mbar)

An active monsoon trough over the Western Pacific Ocean developed 3 typhoons; Frankie, Gloria, and Herb. The first, Frankie, developed in the South China Sea on July 19. It tracked west-northwestward and became a tropical storm on the 21st. After crossing the island of Hainan Frankie rapidly intensified to a 100 mph typhoon, 975 millibar over the Gulf of Tonkin. It made landfall over northern Vietnam on the 23rd, and dissipated 2 days later over China. The lowest atmospheric pressure during the storm was recorded at Văn Lý weather station (Nam Hà province; 20°07'17.0"N, 106°18'10.8"E), reaching 969.0 hPa (28.61 inHg). Due to the storm, strong winds were recorded on land: sustained winds of approximately 28–30 m/s (101–108 km/h) in Thái Bình, and 28 m/s (101 km/h) at Cat Bi International Airport. The total rainfall caused by the storm reached 458 mm, measured at Km46 in Sơn La province.

According to the JTWC, the storm resulted in a total of 104 people dead and missing, 466 people injured, and approximately $200 million in economic damage. Vietnamese documents show that specifically in Vietnam, there were 67 people dead, 54 missing, and 279 injured. The economic damage in Vietnam alone was 1,654 billion Vietnamese dong ($140 million).

=== Typhoon Gloria (Gloring) ===
- Typhoon (JMA)
- Category 2 typhoon (SSHWS)
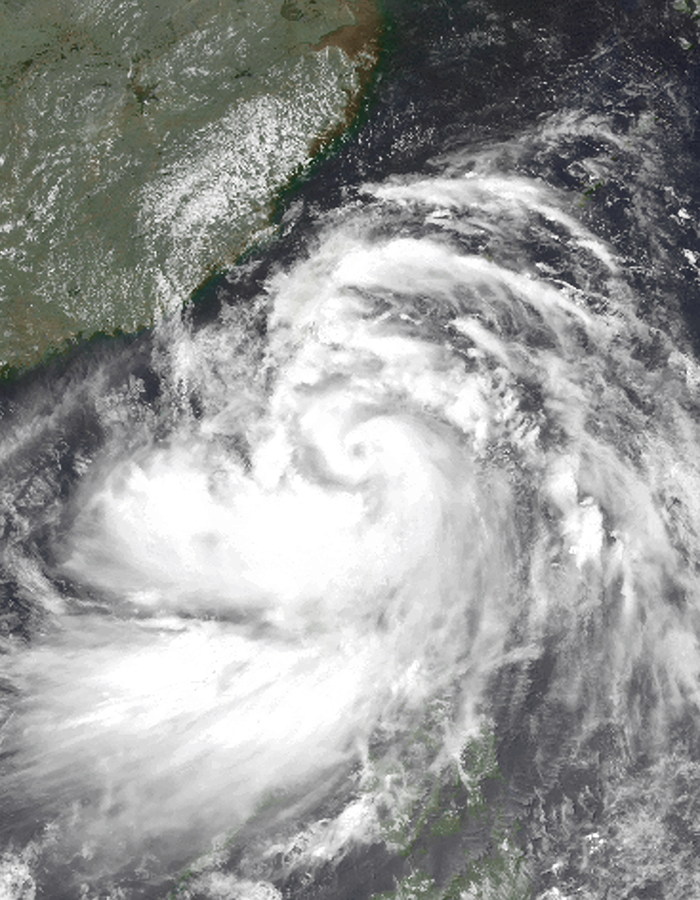
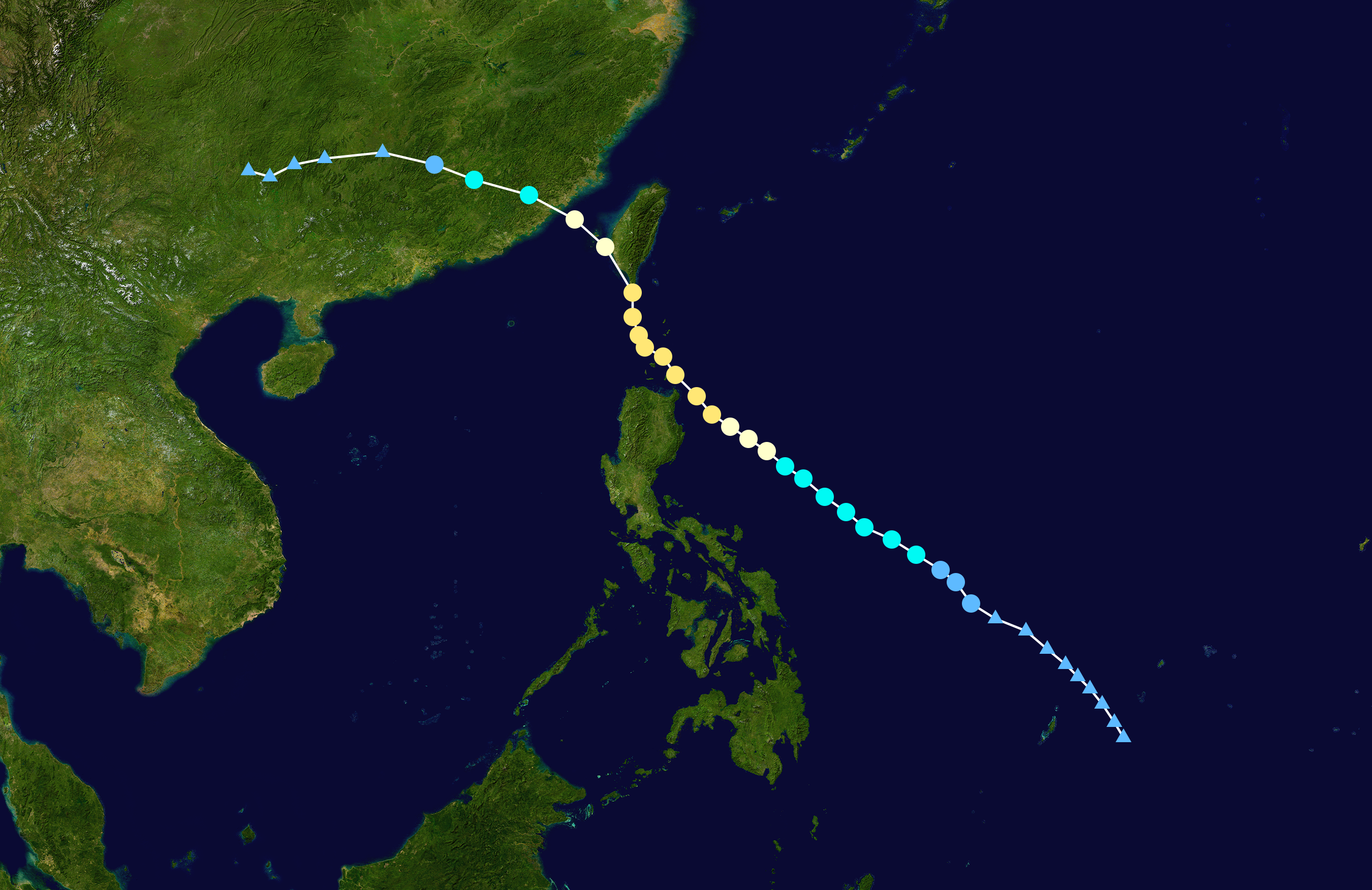
- Duration: July 21 – July 28
- Peak intensity: 120 km/h (75 mph) (10-min); 965 hPa (mbar)

The same monsoon trough that spawned Frankie also spawned a tropical depression on July 19 east of the Philippines. It headed northwestward, slowly organizing into a tropical storm on the 22nd. The next day Gloria reached typhoon strength, and a day later it reached its peak of 100 mph winds. Gloria brushed the northern coast of the Philippines and turned northward to hit Taiwan on the 26th. After crossing the island and the Taiwan Strait, Gloria hit China where she dissipated on the 27th. Gloria caused 23 casualties, 20 of which were in the northern Philippines. In addition, damage was estimated at $20 million (1996 USD).

=== Typhoon Herb (Huaning) ===
- Very strong typhoon (JMA)
- Category 5 super typhoon (SSHWS)
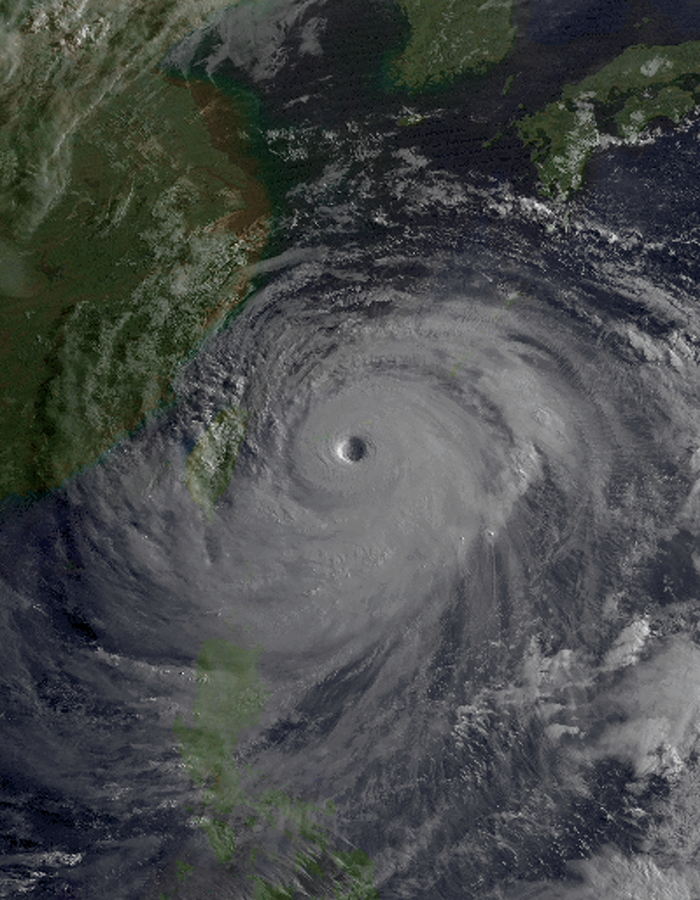
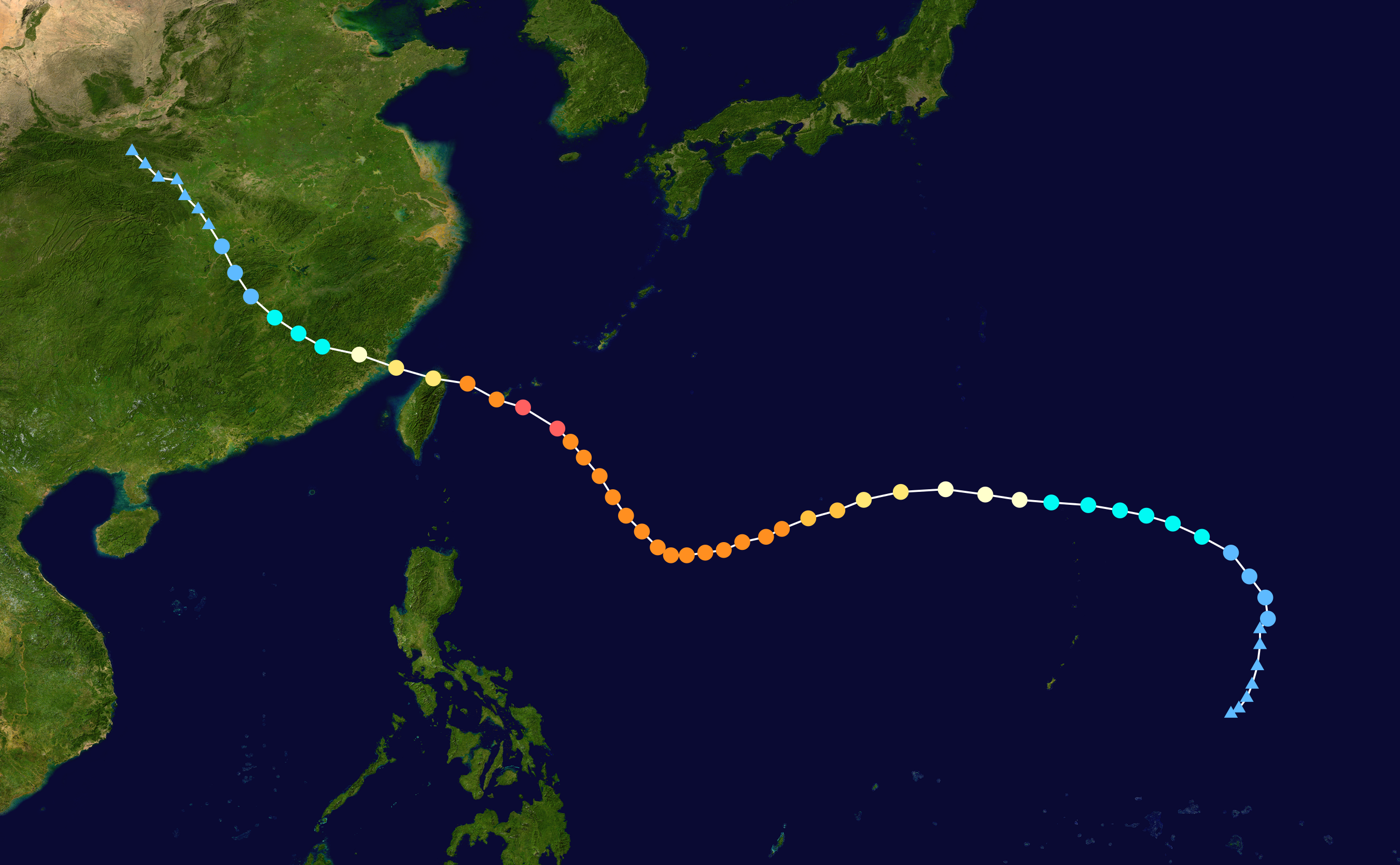
- Duration: July 23 – August 4
- Peak intensity: 175 km/h (110 mph) (10-min); 925 hPa (mbar)

Super Typhoon Herb was the strongest and the largest storm of 1996. Herb struck Ryūkyū Islands, Taiwan and China. Maximum sustained winds of the cyclone reached 160 miles per hour (260 km/h) over the open ocean. The system led to 590 casualties and US$5 billion in damage (1996 dollars).

=== Tropical Depression Ian ===
- Tropical depression (JMA)
- Tropical storm (SSHWS)
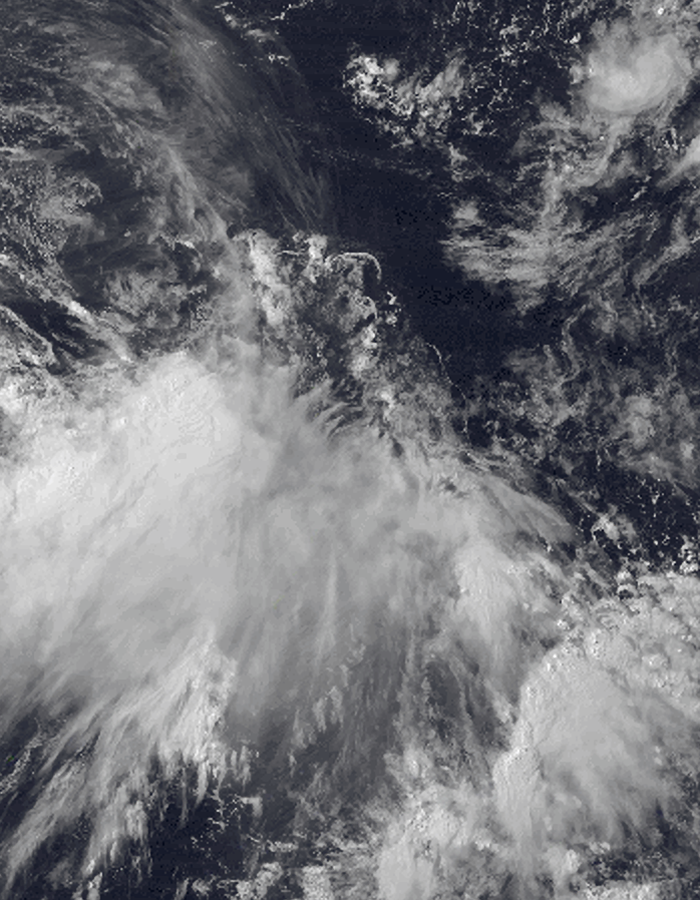
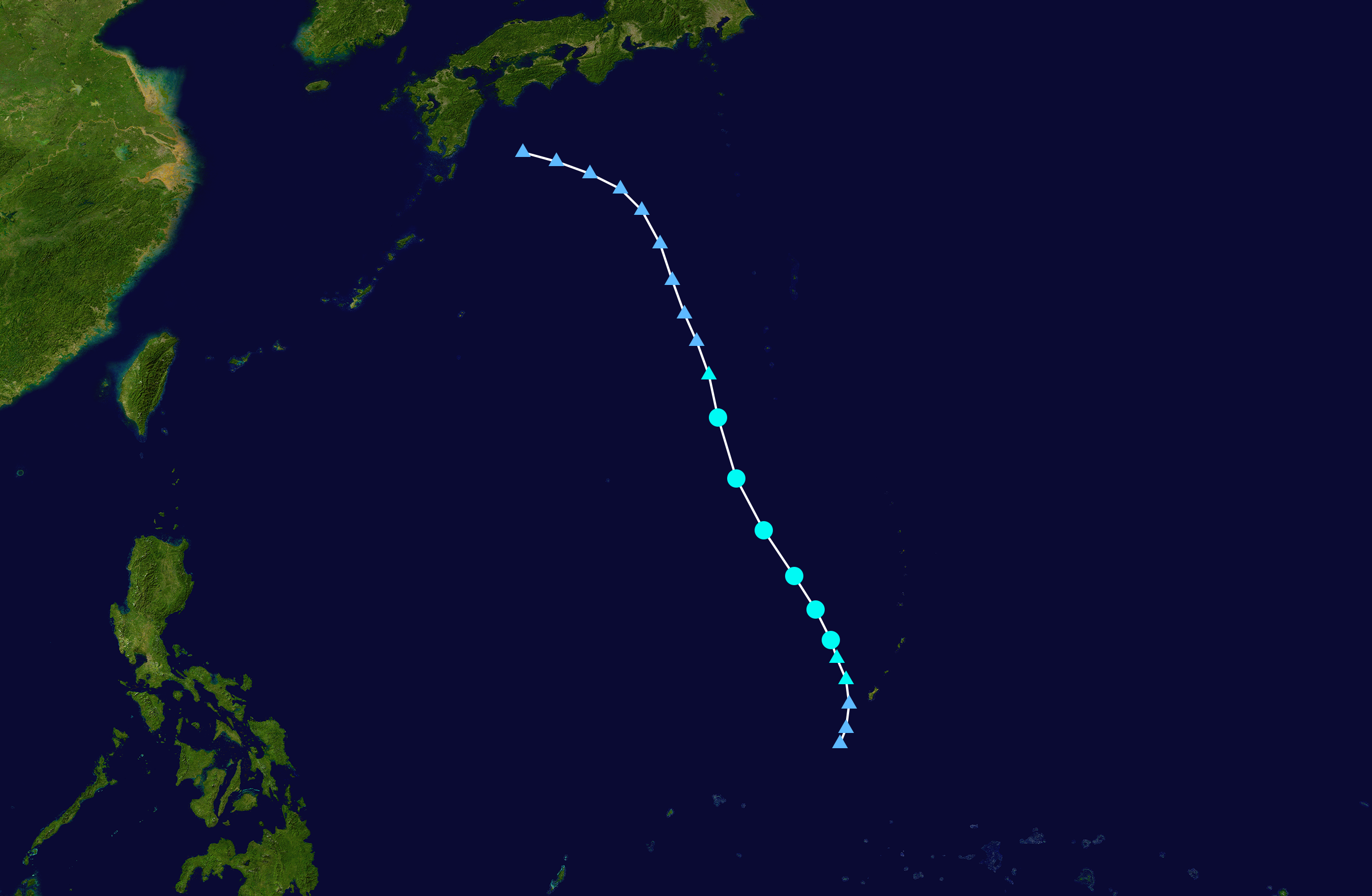
- Duration: July 28 – July 29
- Peak intensity: 75 km/h (45 mph) (1-min); 1002 hPa (mbar)

Ian was a weak tropical storm that existed from July 27 to July 31.

=== Severe Tropical Storm Joy ===
- Severe tropical storm (JMA)
- Category 1 typhoon (SSHWS)
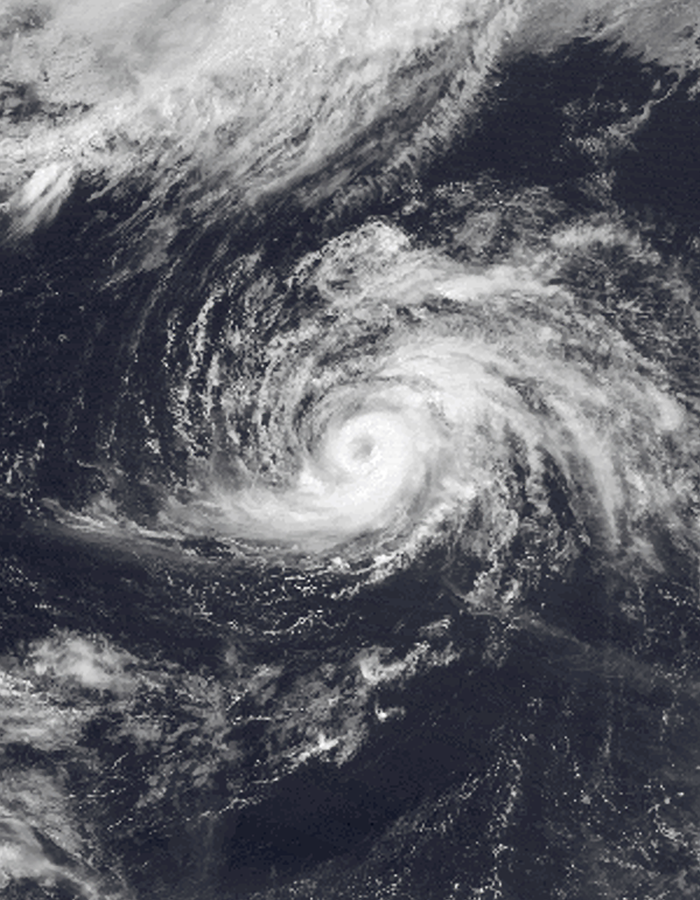
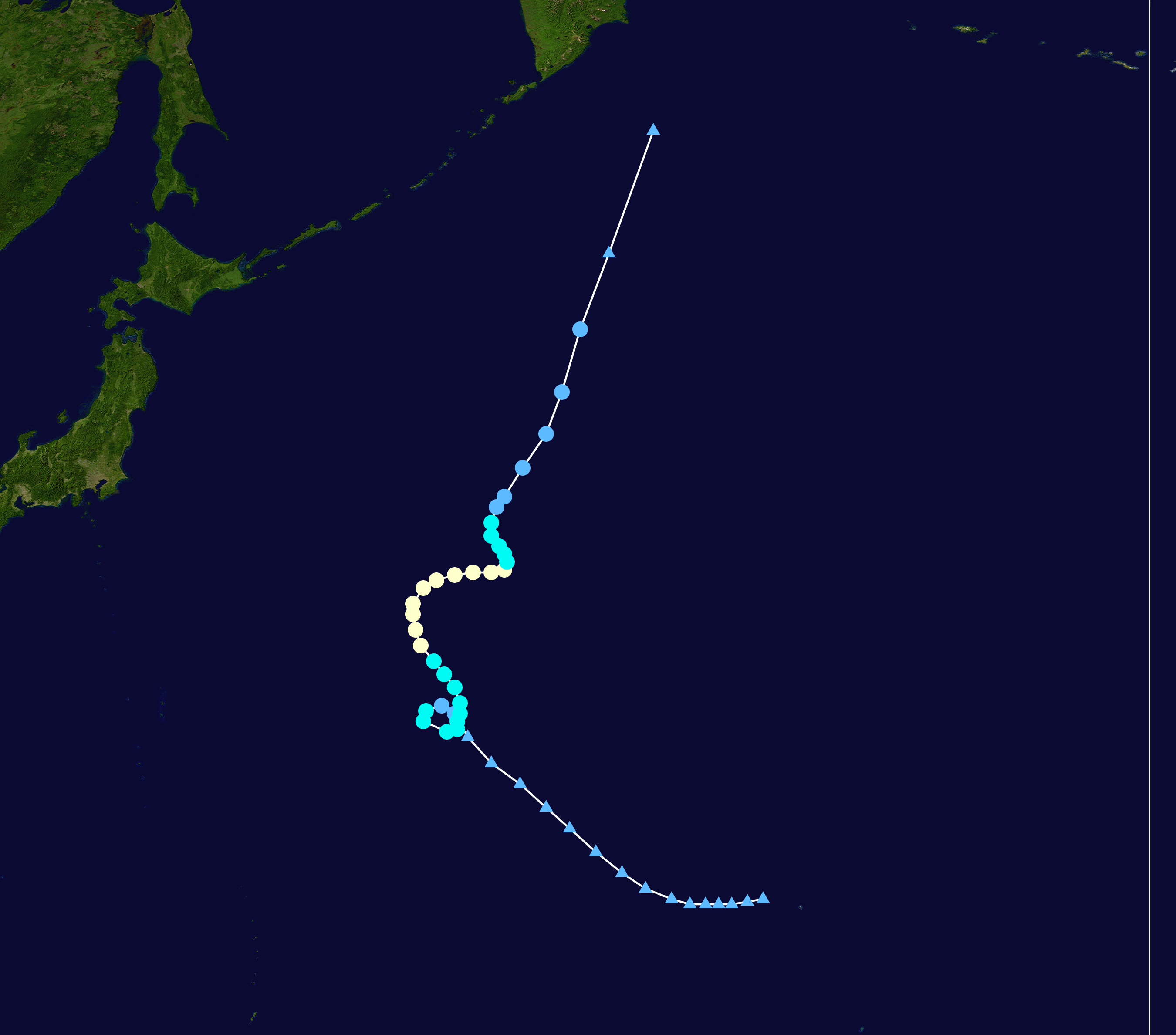
- Duration: July 29 – August 6
- Peak intensity: 100 km/h (65 mph) (10-min); 980 hPa (mbar)

=== Typhoon Kirk (Isang) ===
- Typhoon (JMA)
- Category 2 typhoon (SSHWS)
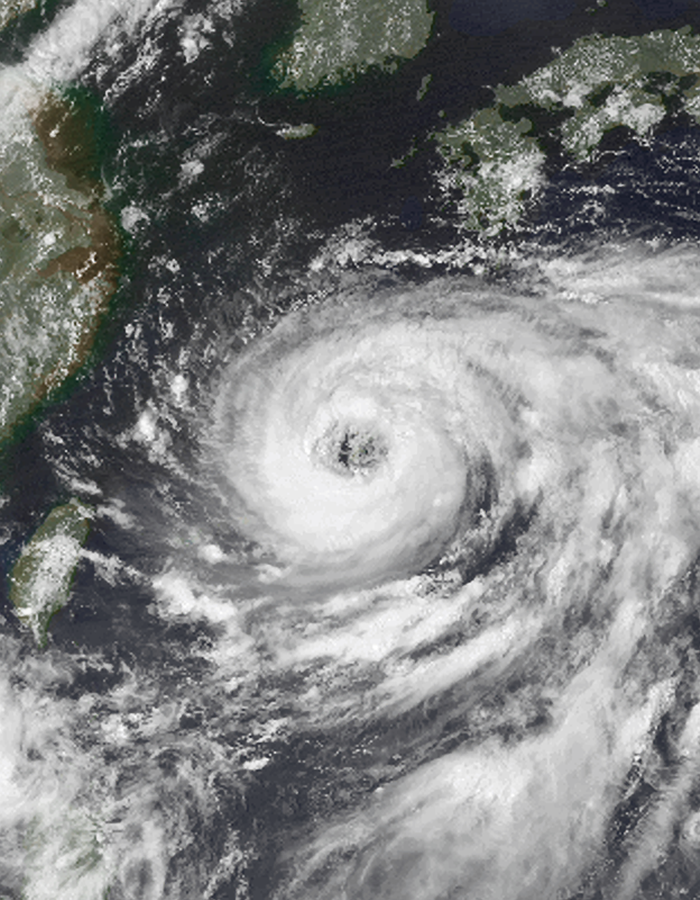
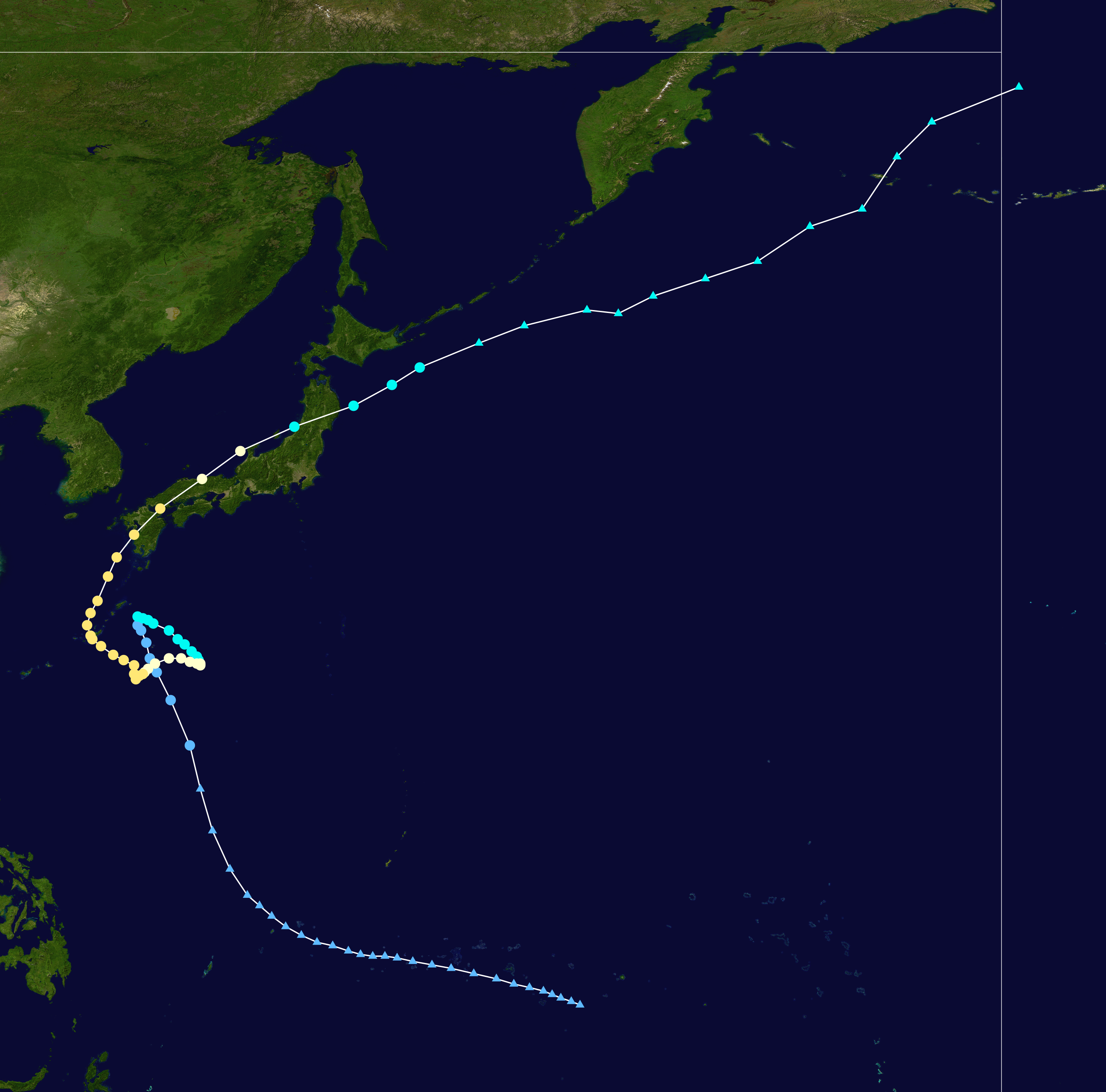
- Duration: August 3 – August 15
- Peak intensity: 140 km/h (85 mph) (10-min); 955 hPa (mbar)

A monsoon depression developed on July 28 over the open Pacific Ocean. It headed northwestward, slowly consolidating to become a tropical storm on the 5th. While south of Japan, Kirk drifted to the southeast and looped back to the west, strengthening to a typhoon on the 8th while looping. It continued slowly northwestward, and while curving to the northeast Kirk reached a peak of 110 mph winds. The typhoon struck southwestern Japan at that intensity on the 14th. It weakened over the country, and dissipated on the 16th over the northern Pacific. Kirk caused heavy flooding, resulting in at least 2 deaths and ¥20.6 billion (US$189 million) in damage.

=== Tropical Storm Lisa ===
- Tropical storm (JMA)
- Tropical storm (SSHWS)
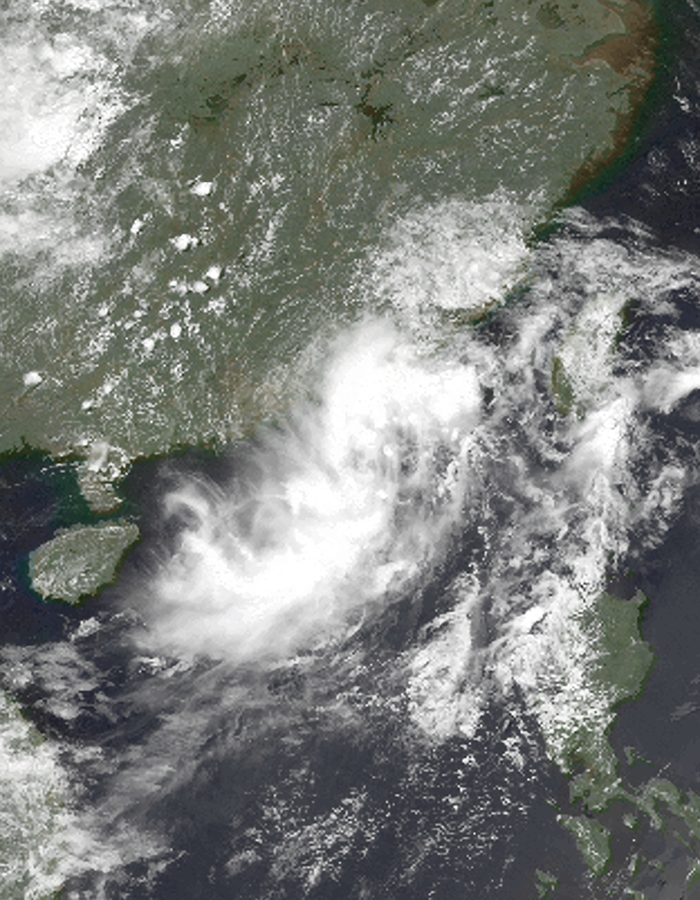
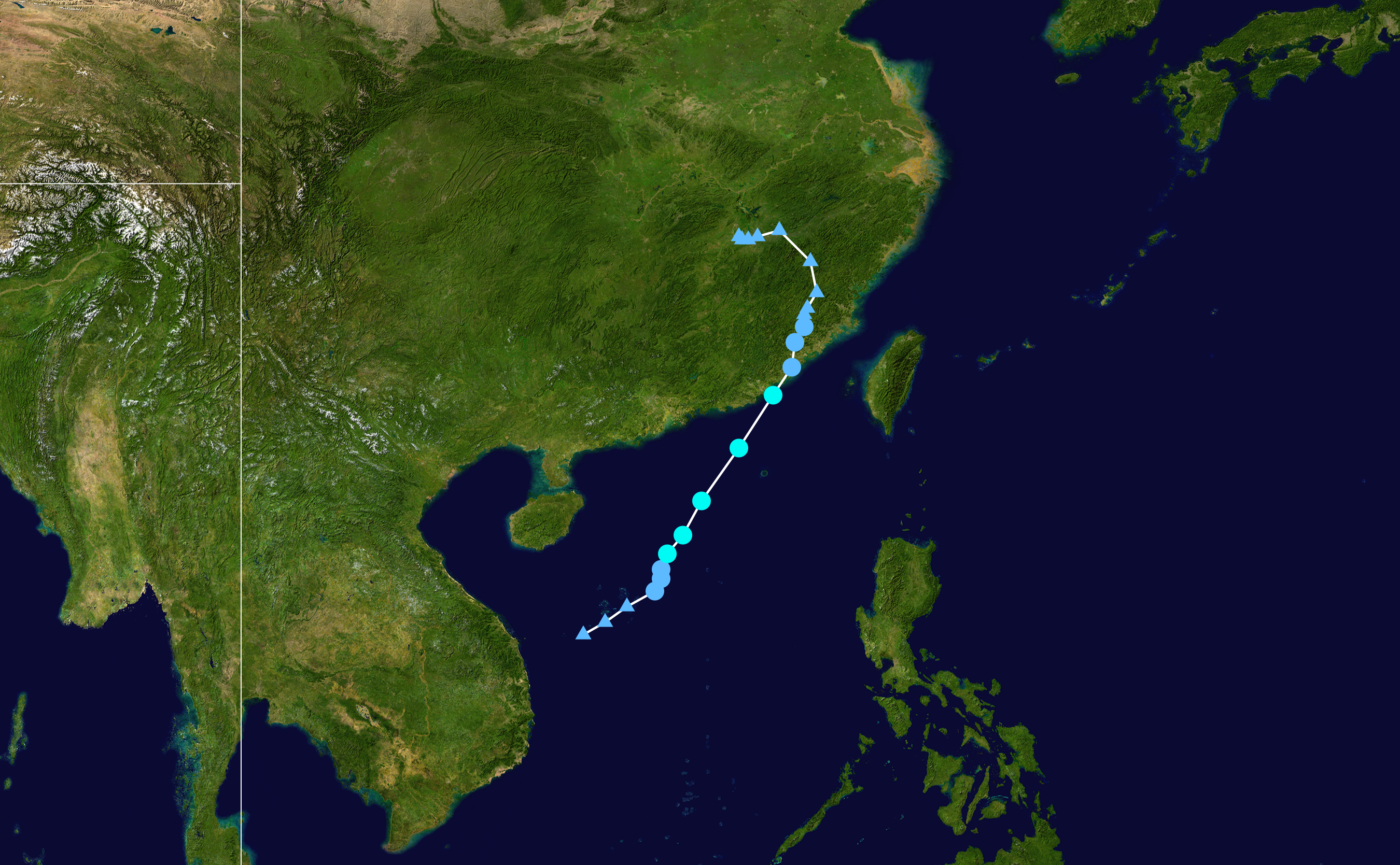
- Duration: August 5 – August 9
- Peak intensity: 75 km/h (45 mph) (10-min); 996 hPa (mbar)

The JTWC began monitoring an area of low pressure in the South China Sea on August 5 with a high chance of becoming a tropical depression. It became a tropical depression designated 14W as it began tracking towards southern China. On August 6, the JTWC upgraded the storm to a tropical storm named Lisa. On August 7, Lisa made landfall near Shantou, killing over 90 people. The storm dissipated inland the following few days.

=== Tropical Depression 15W ===
- Tropical depression (JMA)
- Tropical depression (SSHWS)
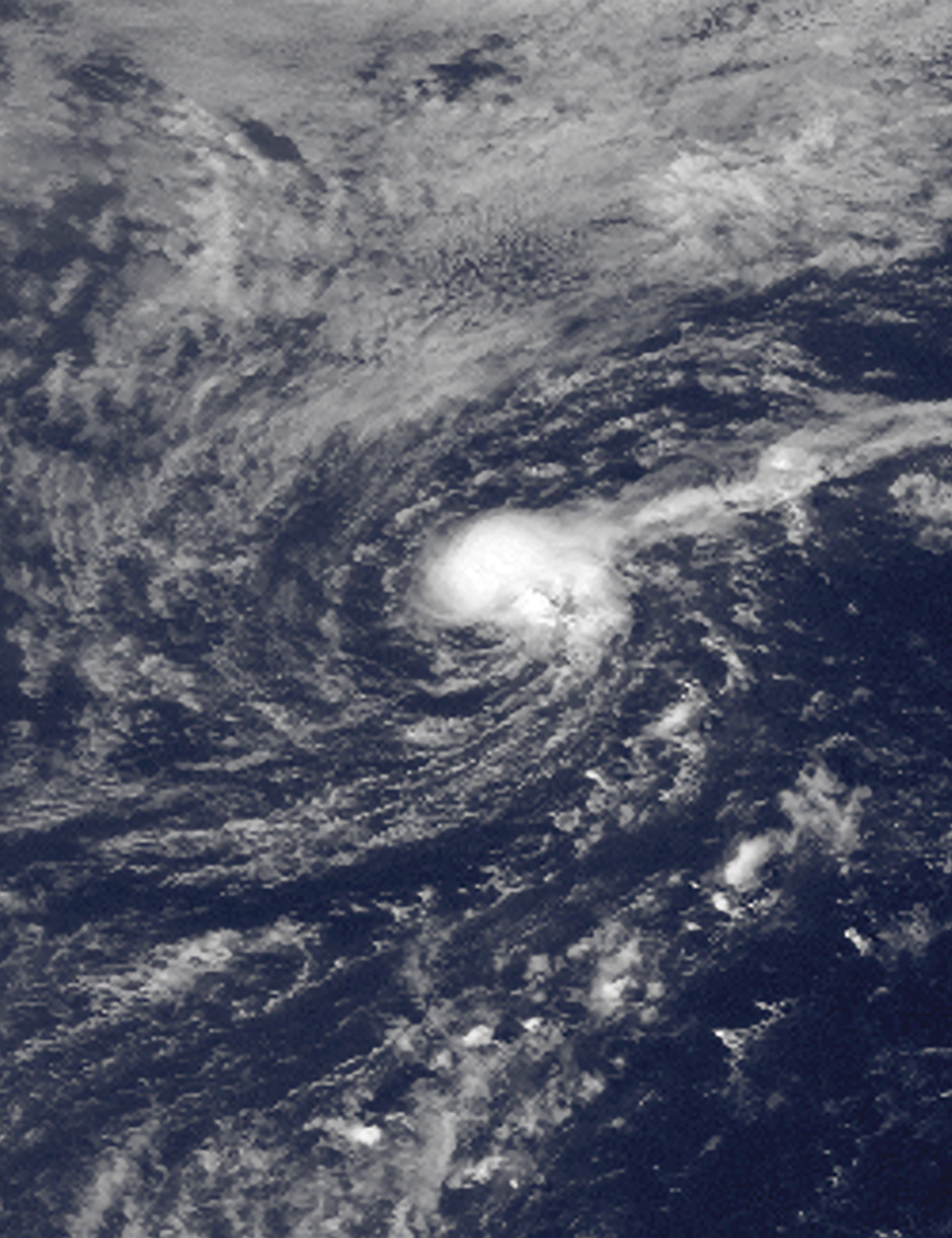
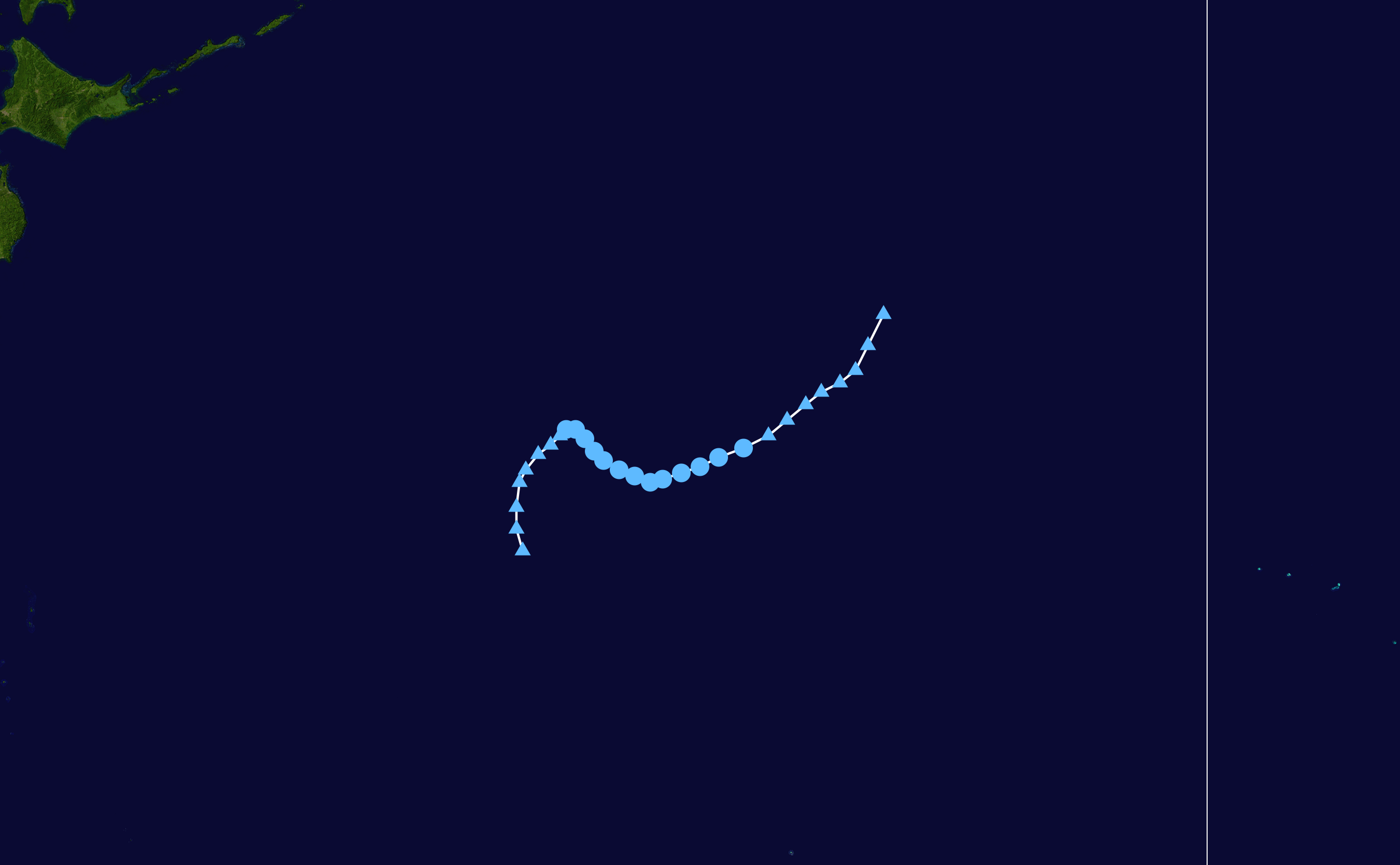
- Duration: August 12 – August 16
- Peak intensity: 55 km/h (35 mph) (1-min); 998 hPa (mbar)

JTWC(Joint Typhoon Warning Center) Monitors Low Pressure System At The Western Pacific Near Miles Of Basin On August 10th Later 2 Days Later JMA(Japan Meteorological Agency) Upgrade It Into Tropical Depression Began Monitor It's Tracks Since No Warning Issued In Nearby Islands JMA Later Disintegrated System Into Low Pressure Later By August 16th Midnight It Dissipated

=== Tropical Storm Marty ===
- Tropical storm (SSHWS)
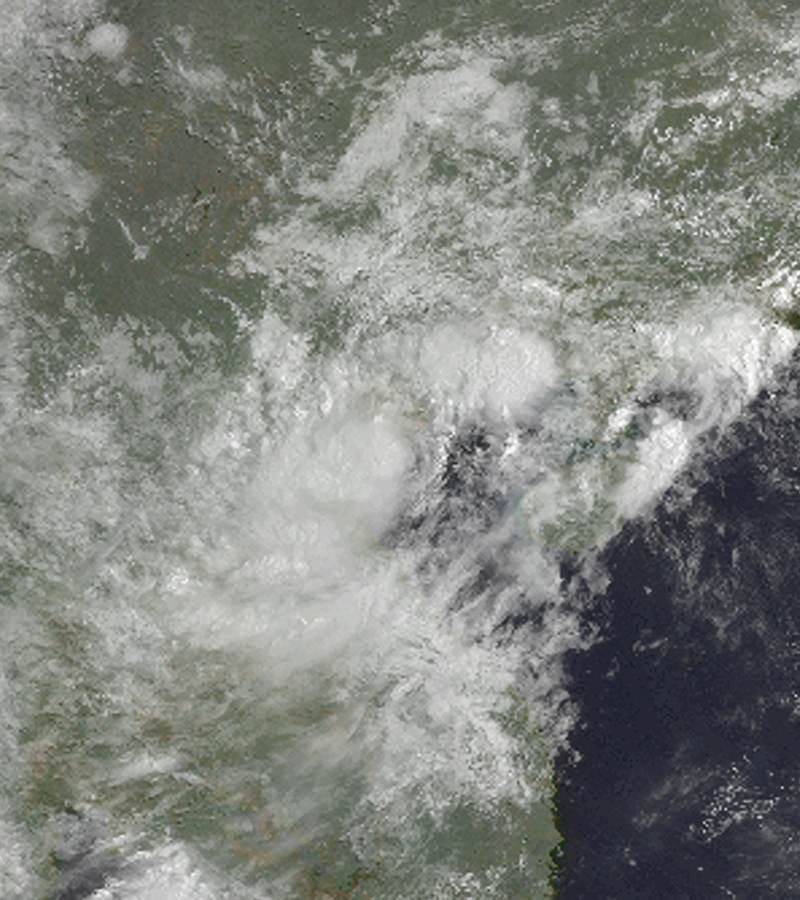
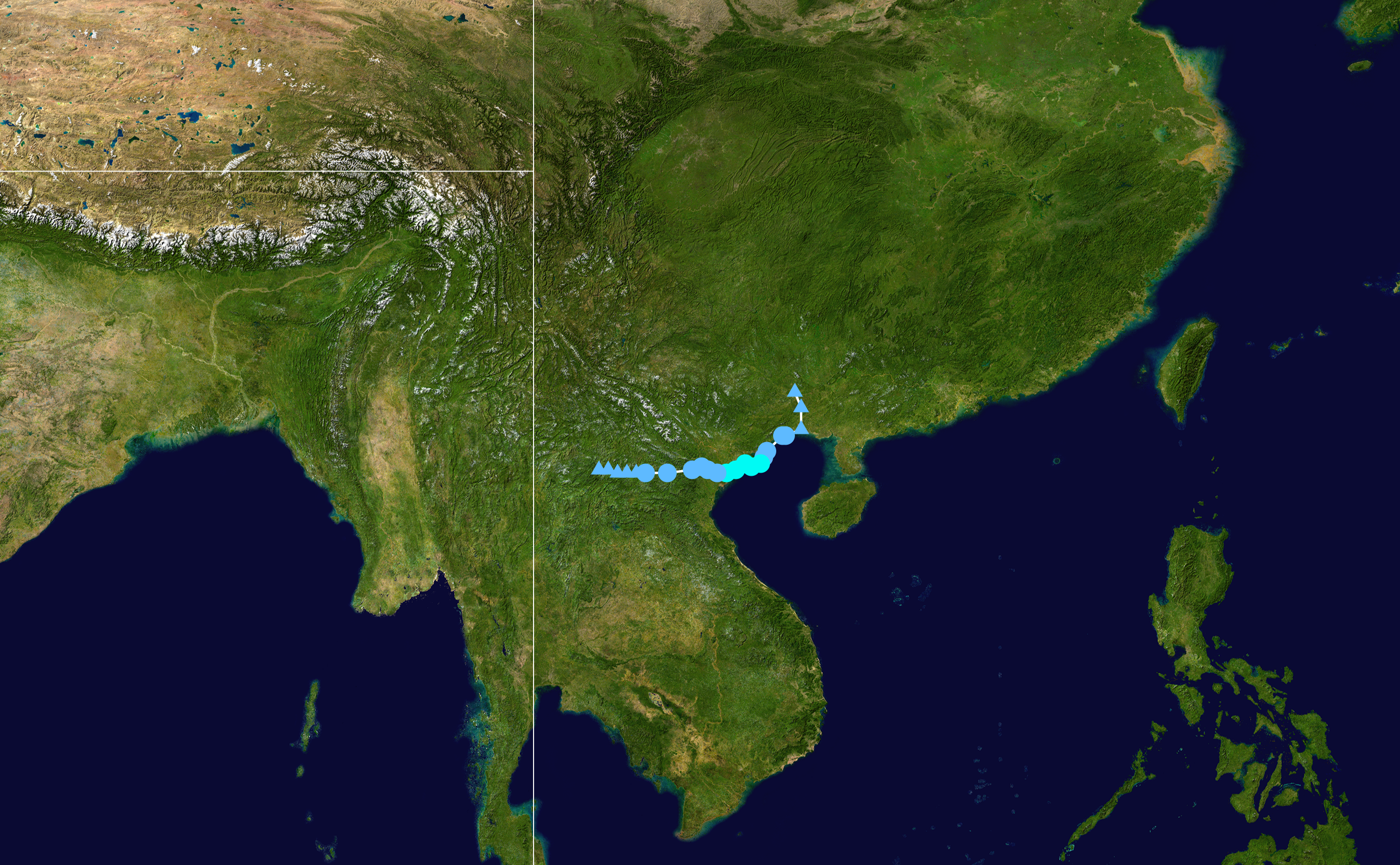
- Duration: August 12 – August 16
- Peak intensity: 95 km/h (60 mph) (1-min); 998 hPa (mbar)

The monsoon trough spawned a tropical depression over southern China on August 11. It drifted southwestward, entering the Gulf of Tonkin on the 12th. Marty made landfall on the 14th on northern Vietnam, where it dissipated 3 days later.

According to the Joint Typhoon Warning Center (JTWC), Marty has reached tropical storm intensity with winds of 50 knots (95 km/h). However, both the Japan Meteorological Agency (JMA) and the National Center for Hydro-Meteorological Forecasting of Vietnam (NCHMF) classify Marty as a tropical depression. Based on surface weather observations, no weather station recorded sustained winds of Force 7 or higher on the Beaufort scale (50 km/h or more). The strongest gust measured on land was 72 km/h (20 m/s) at the Văn Lý weather station (Nam Hà province), where the lowest sea-level pressure of 989.4 hPa was also recorded at 10:00 ICT on August 14.

Though small and somewhat weak, Marty managed to cause severe damage and flooding, amounting to the deaths of 125 with 107 people missing.

=== Tropical Depression 17W ===
- Tropical depression (JMA)
- Tropical depression (SSHWS)
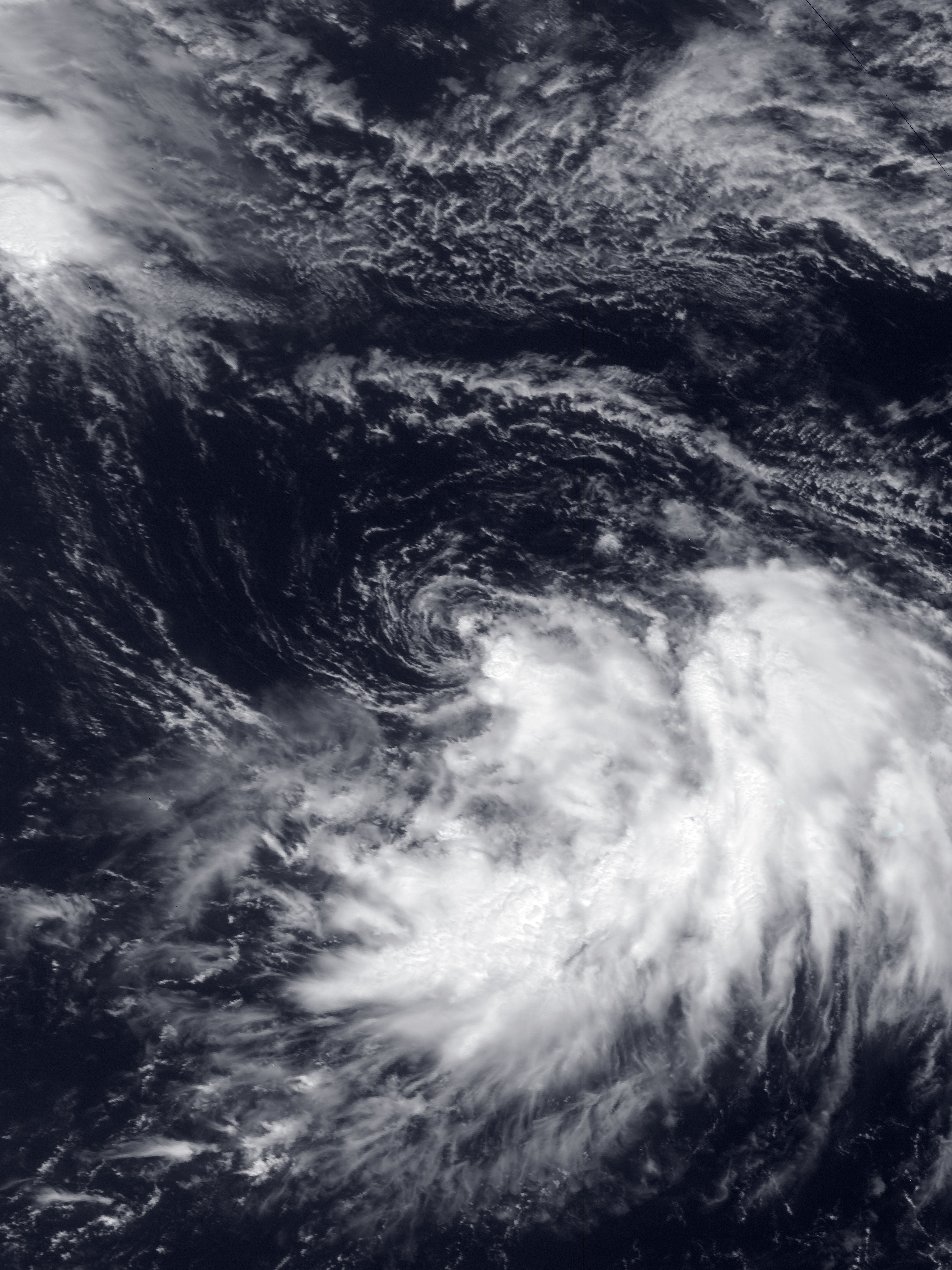
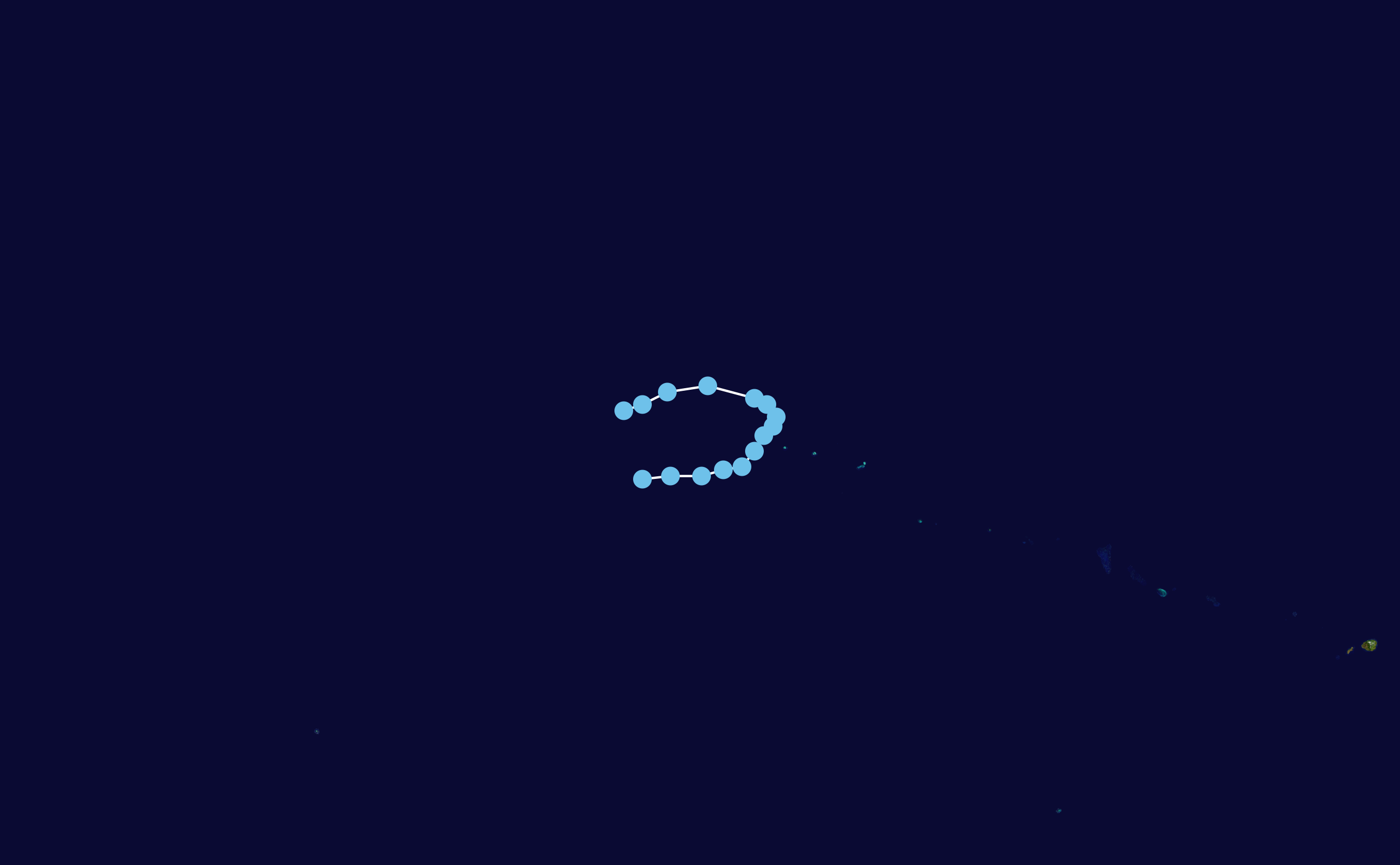
- Duration: August 13 – August 16 (Out of basin from August 14 to August 15)
- Peak intensity: 55 km/h (35 mph) (1-min); 1008 hPa (mbar)

Tropical Depression 17W existed from August 13 to August 16.

=== Typhoon Niki (Lusing) ===
- Typhoon (JMA)
- Category 2 typhoon (SSHWS)
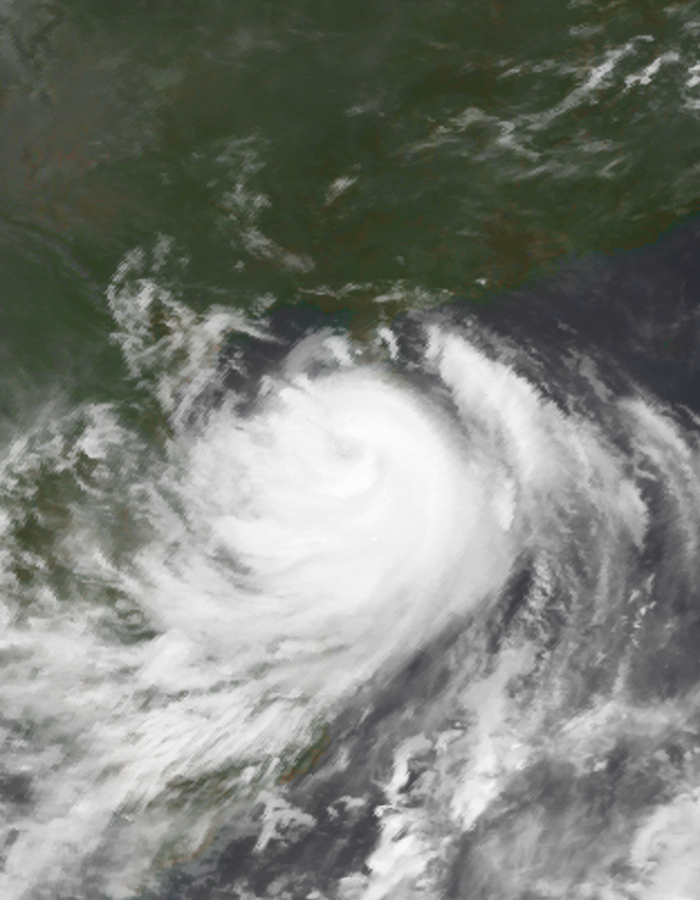
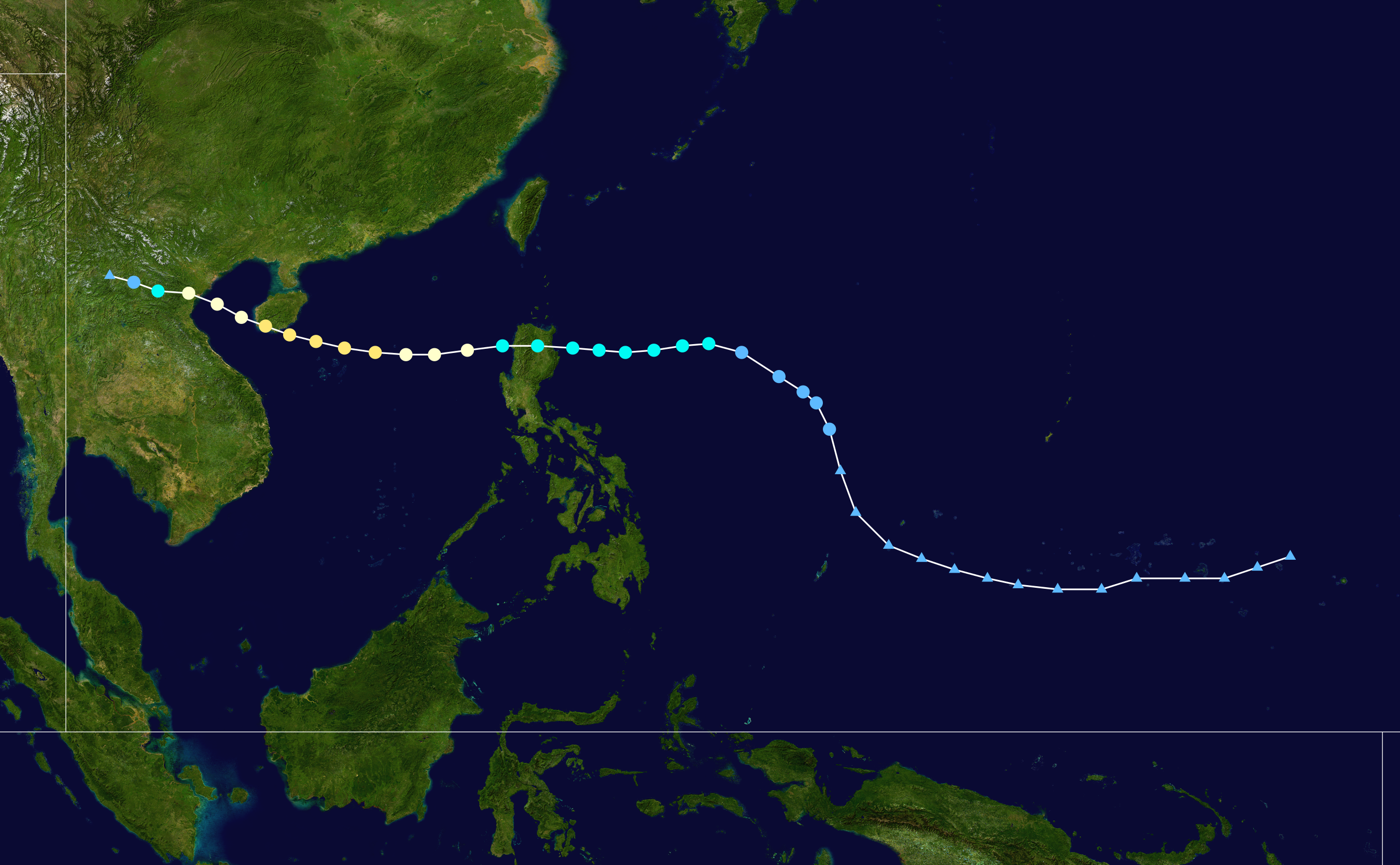
- Duration: August 17 – August 23
- Peak intensity: 120 km/h (75 mph) (10-min); 970 hPa (mbar)

Niki developed on August 16. It struck Luzon on August 19 and then crossed the South China Sea. The typhoon later made landfall in Hainan on August 20 and northern Vietnam on August 21. Niki dissipated by August 23.

During the Typhoon Niki, the Văn Lý weather station recorded sustained winds of 31 m/s (112 km/h) and a minimum sea-level pressure of 983.8 hPa. The storm resulted in 60 deaths, 161 injuries, and 1 person missing. The total economic damage was estimated at 670 billion VND.

=== Typhoon Orson ===
- Typhoon (JMA)
- Category 4 typhoon (SSHWS)
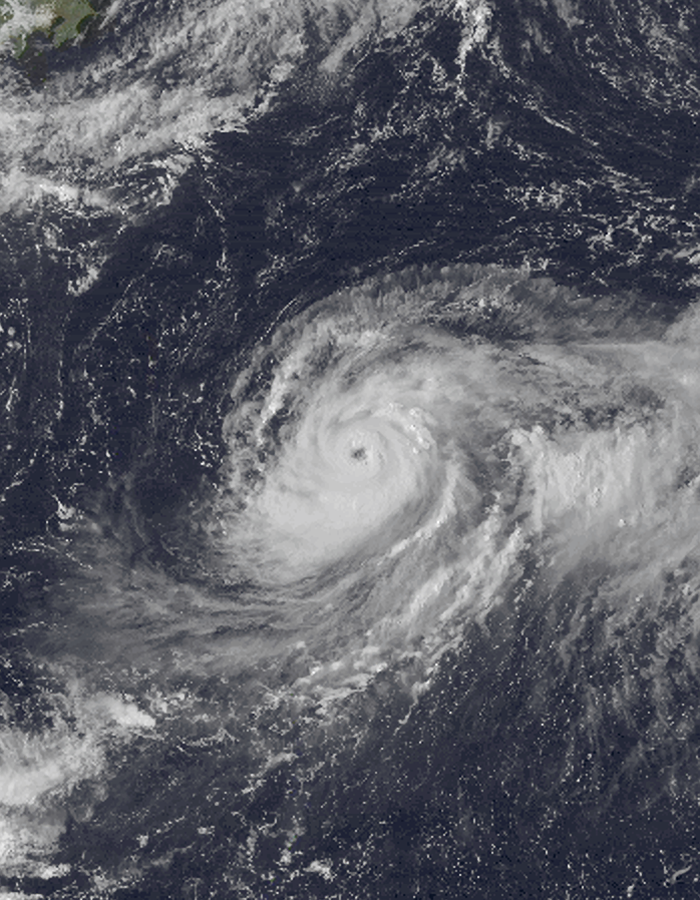
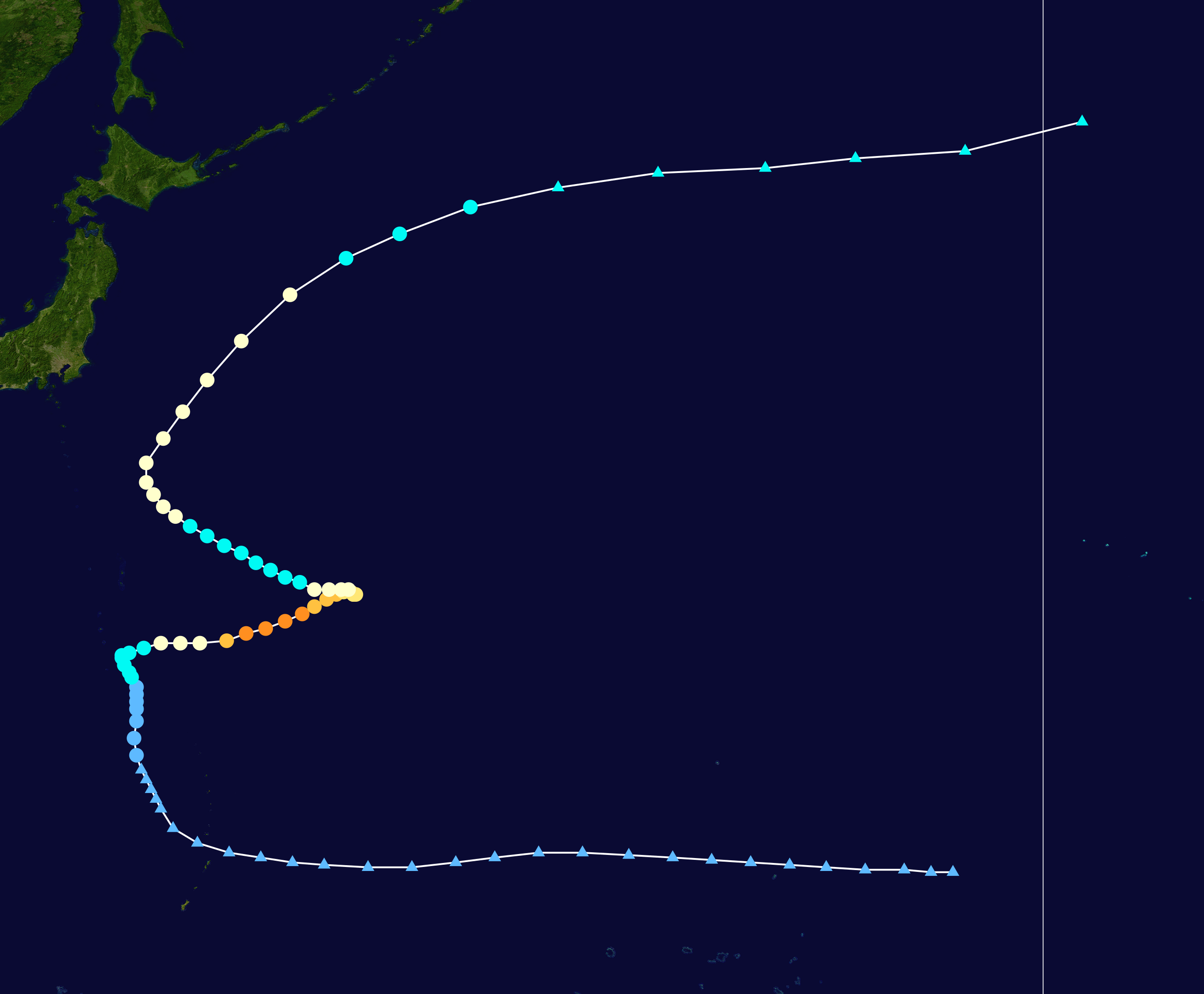
- Duration: August 20 – September 3
- Peak intensity: 140 km/h (85 mph) (10-min); 955 hPa (mbar)

Orson existed from August 20 to September 3.

=== Tropical Storm Piper ===
- Tropical storm (JMA)
- Category 1 typhoon (SSHWS)
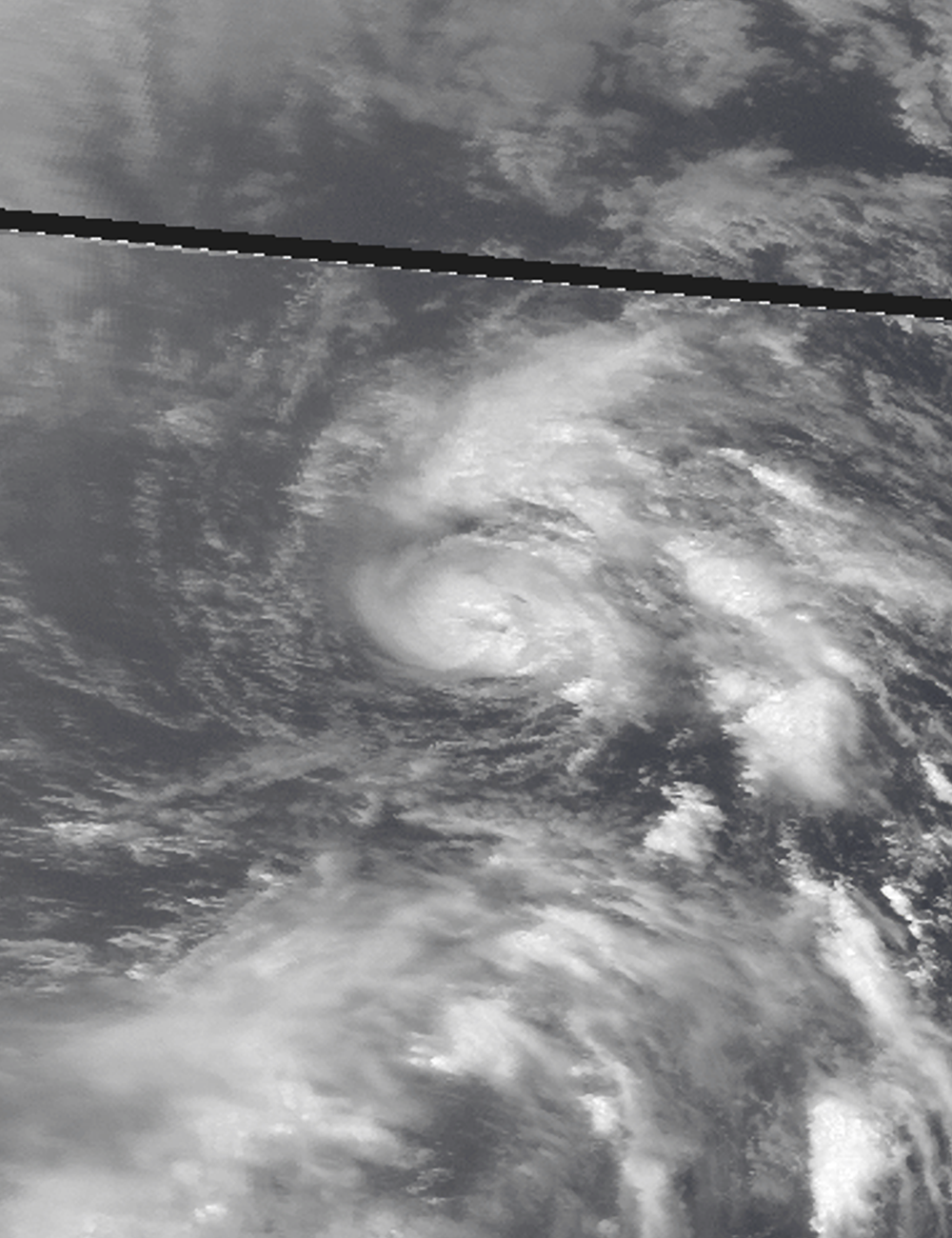
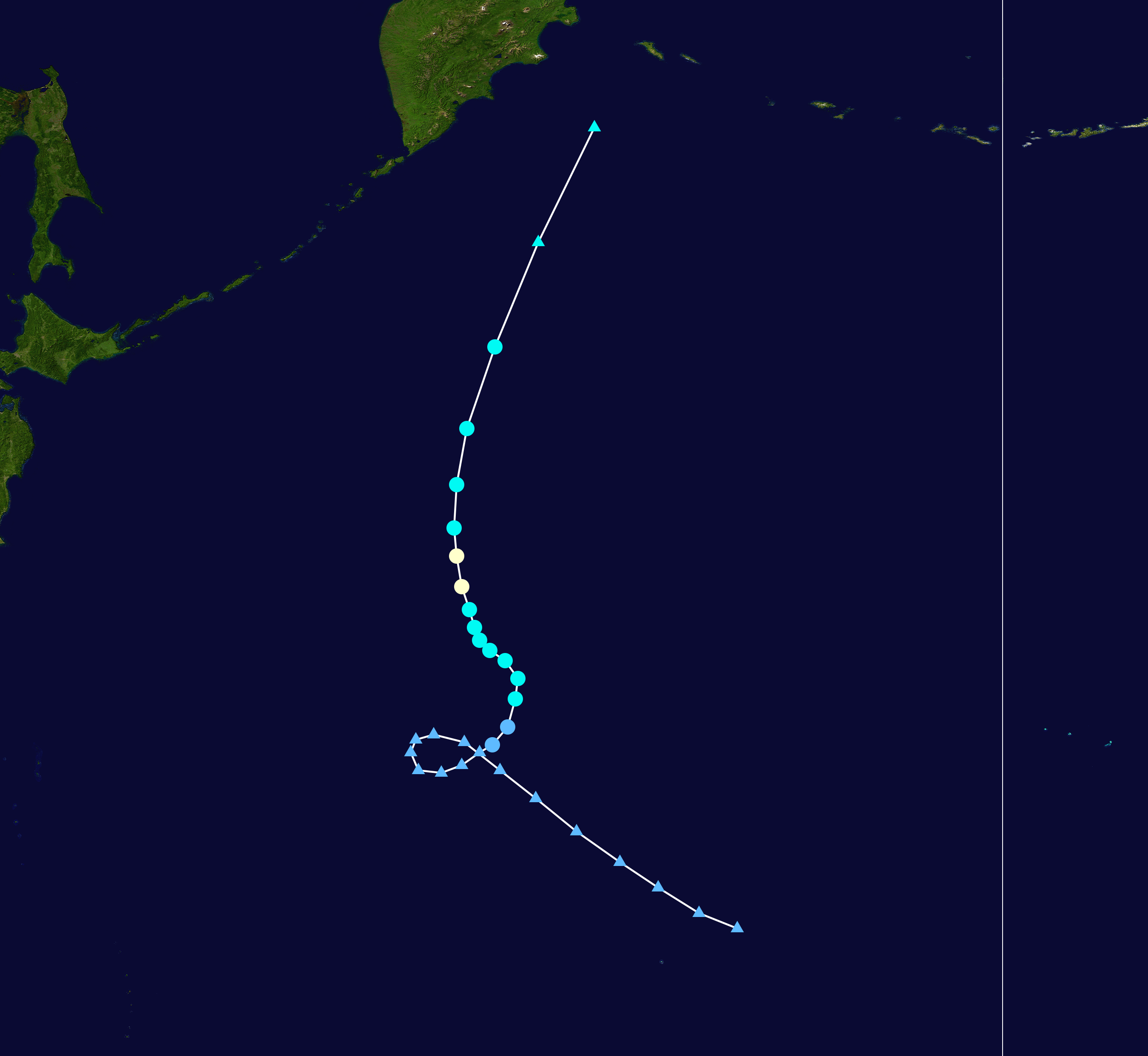
- Duration: August 22 – August 26
- Peak intensity: 75 km/h (45 mph) (10-min); 996 hPa (mbar)

Piper existed from August 22 to August 26.

=== Tropical Depression 21W ===
- Tropical depression (JMA)
- Tropical depression (SSHWS)
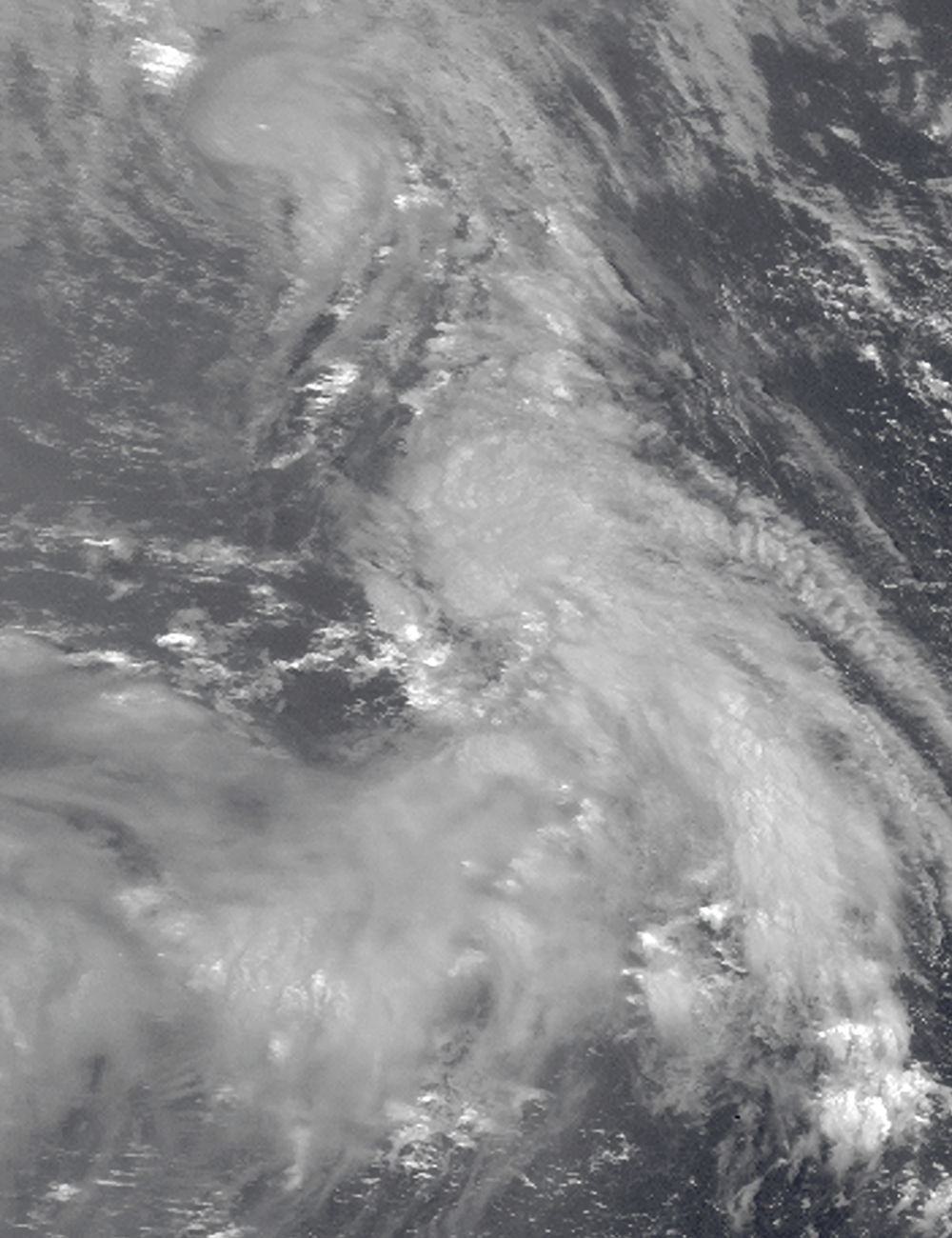
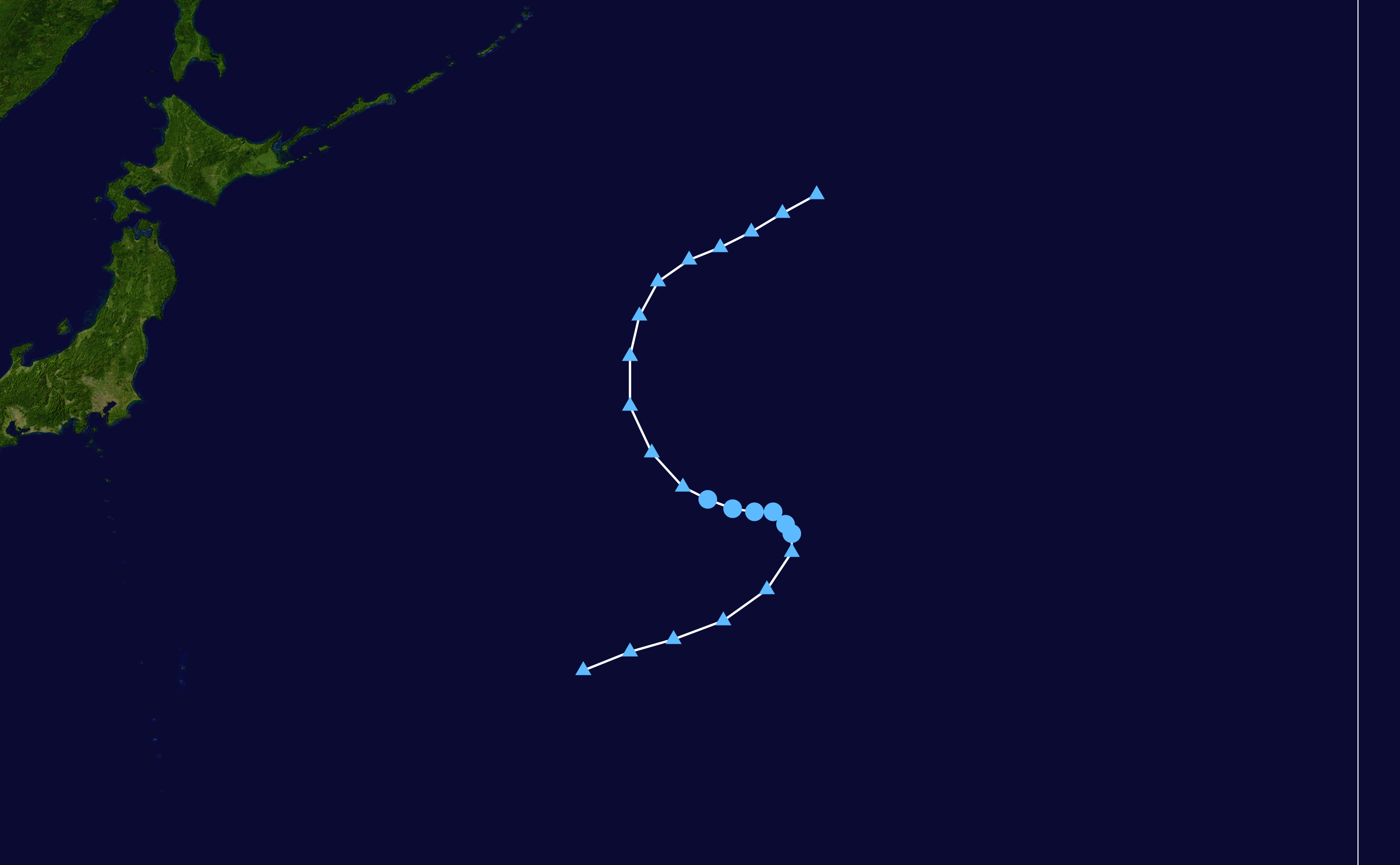
- Duration: August 26 – August 27
- Peak intensity: 45 km/h (30 mph) (1-min); 1008 hPa (mbar)

Tropical Depression 21W existed from August 25 to August 29.

=== Tropical Storm Rick ===
- Tropical depression (JMA)
- Tropical storm (SSHWS)
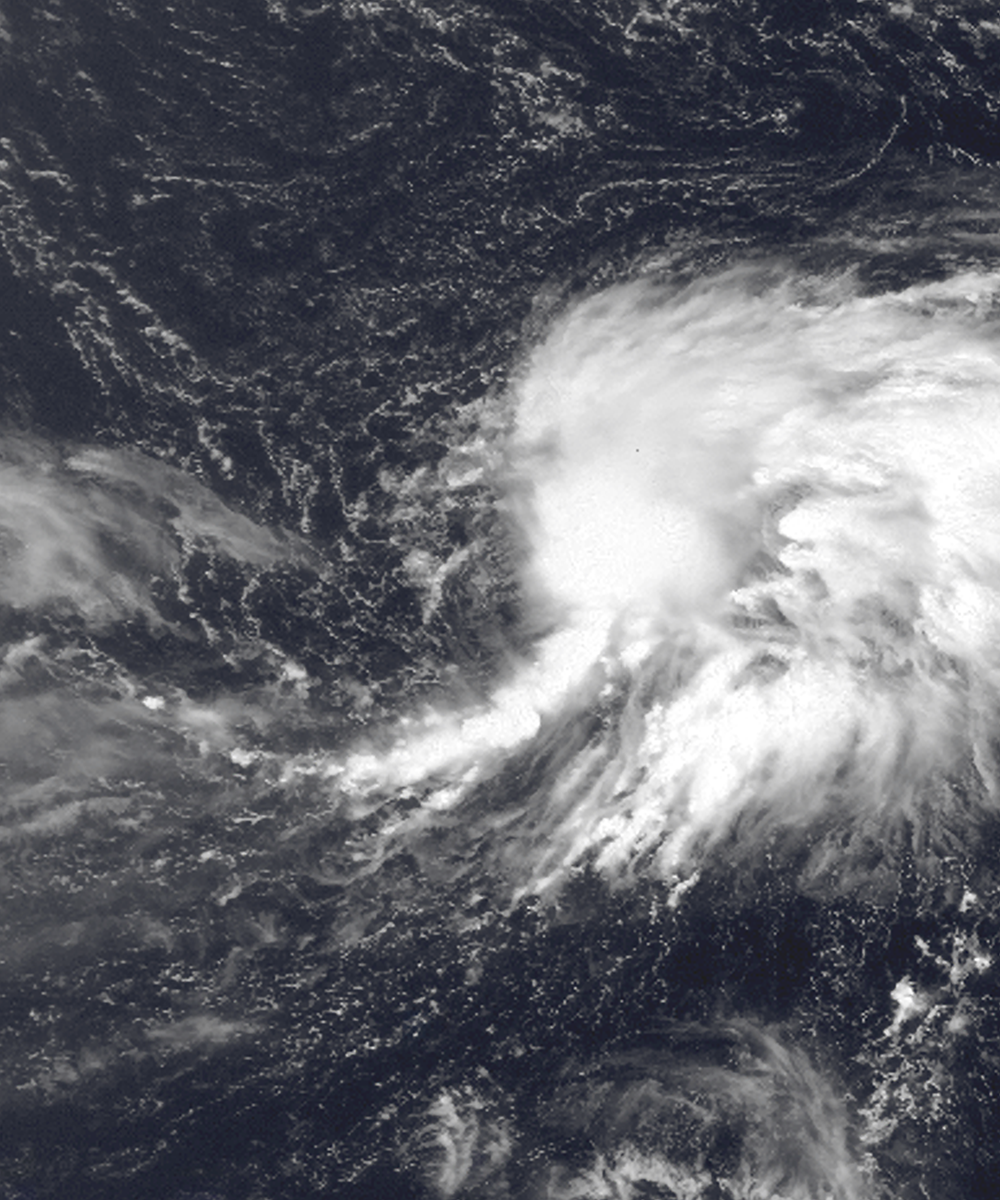
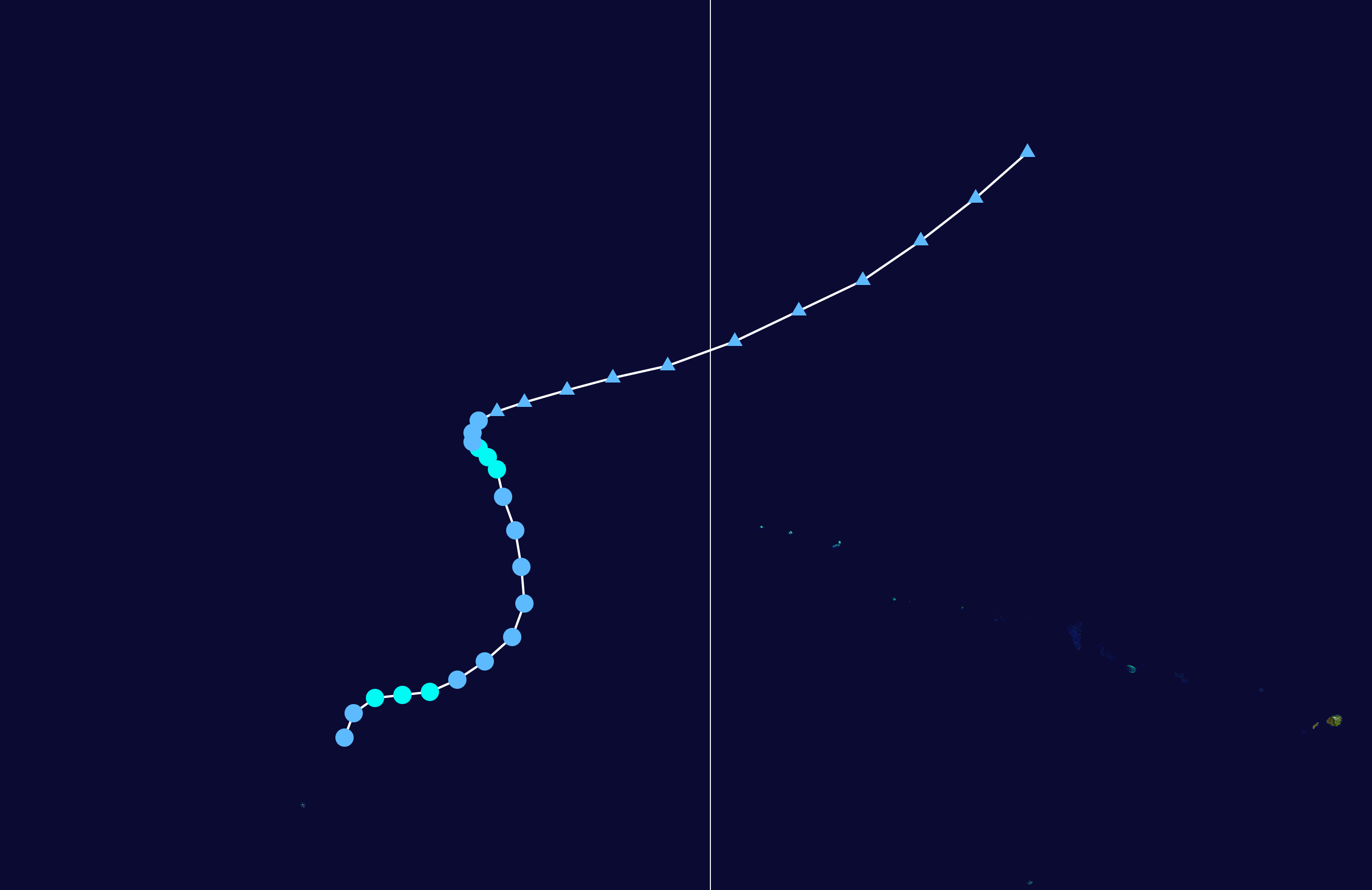
- Duration: August 28 – September 2
- Peak intensity: 65 km/h (40 mph) (1-min); 1004 hPa (mbar)

Rick existed from August 27 to September 3.

=== Typhoon Sally (Maring) ===
- Very strong typhoon (JMA)
- Category 5 super typhoon (SSHWS)
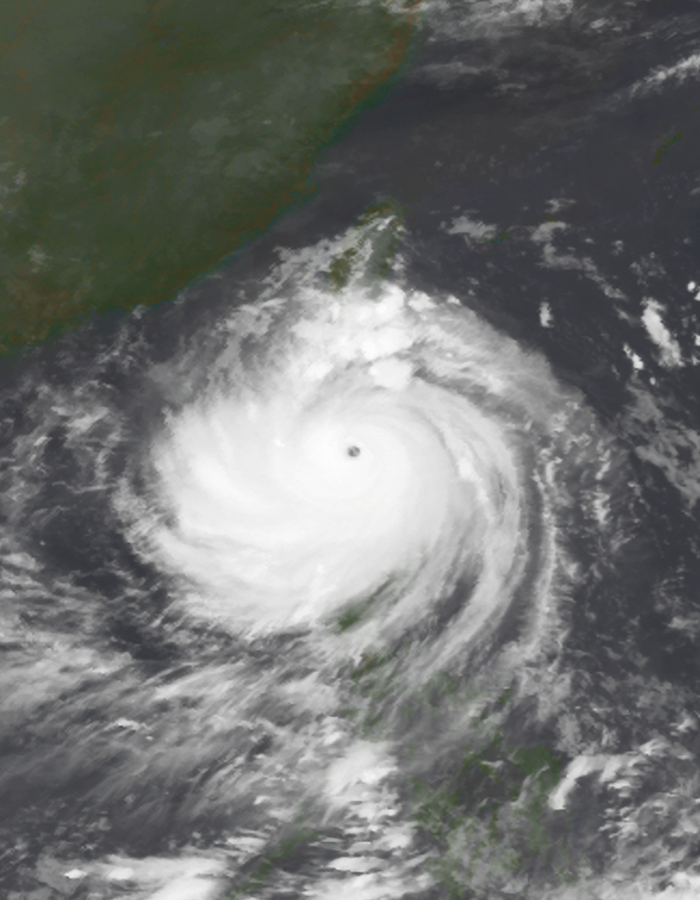
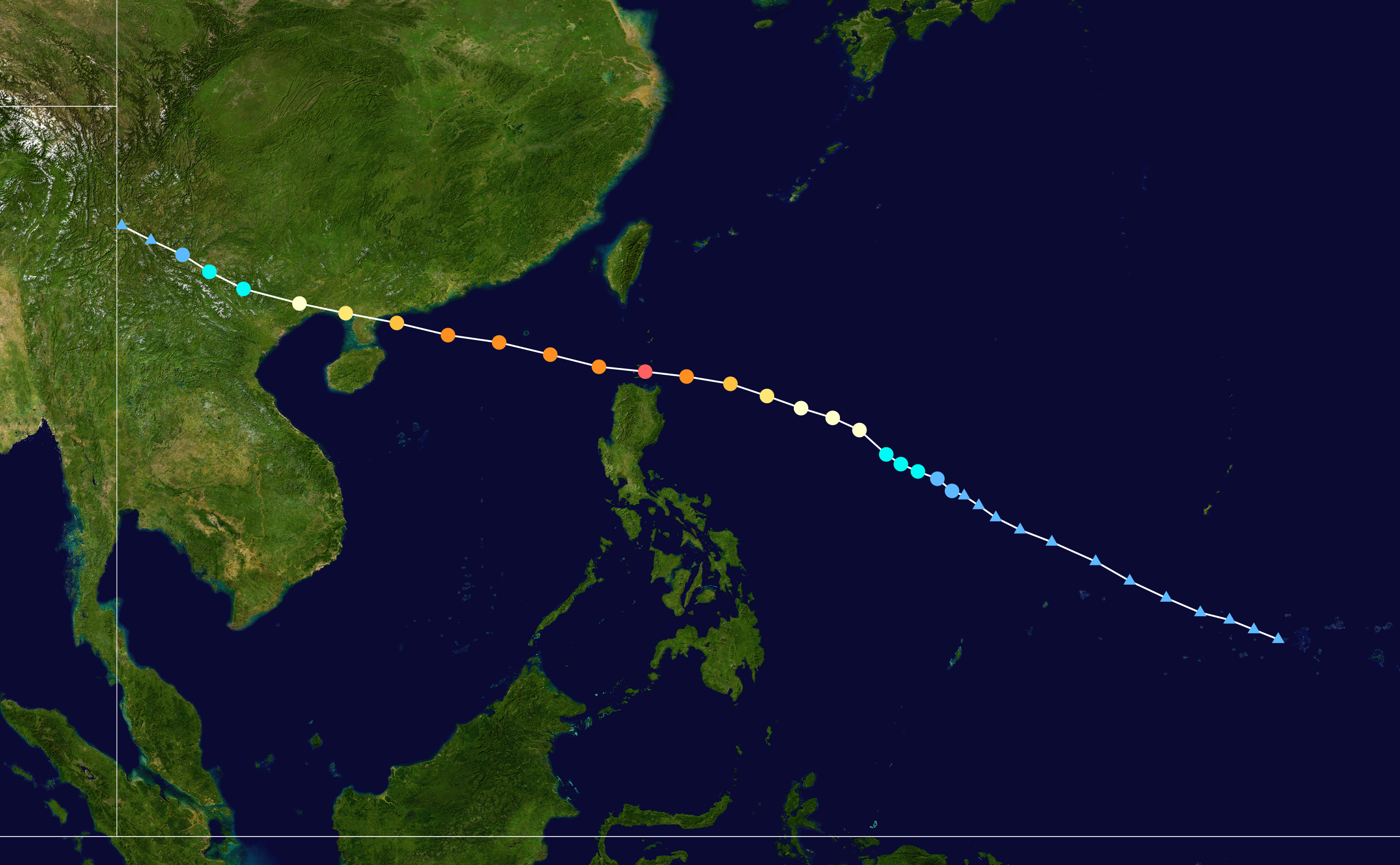
- Duration: September 2 – September 10
- Peak intensity: 155 km/h (100 mph) (10-min); 935 hPa (mbar)

On September 2, a tropical depression developed well east of the Philippines. It headed west-northwestward, reaching tropical storm strength on the 5th and typhoon strength on the 6th. On the 7th Sally rapidly intensified to a 160 mph Super Typhoon while passing just north of the Philippines. It weakened slightly yet steadily to a 115 mph typhoon over the South China Sea, hitting the Luichow Peninsula of China on the 9th, and dissipated the next day over the country. Sally brought heavy rain and damage to China, causing 114 casualties, 110 people missing, and economic losses estimated at $1.5 billion (1996 USD).

=== Tropical Storm 24W (Ningning) ===
- Tropical depression (JMA)
- Tropical storm (SSHWS)
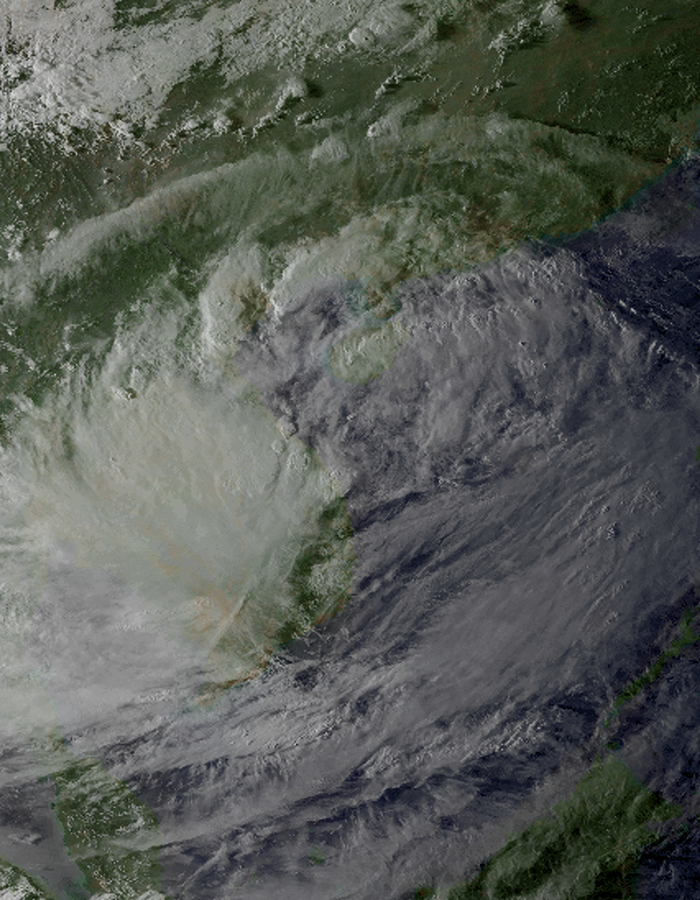
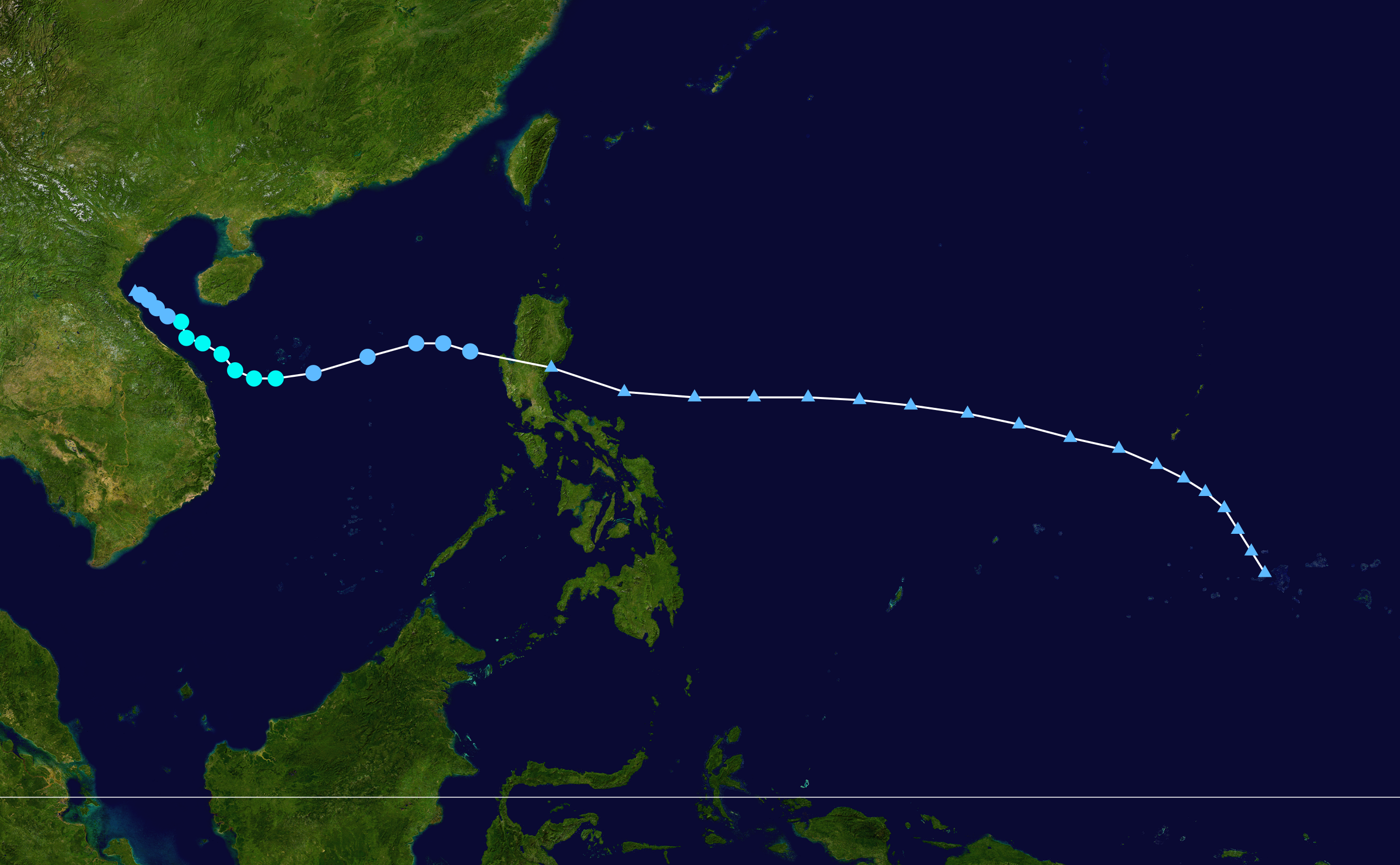
- Duration: September 10 – September 14
- Peak intensity: 85 km/h (50 mph) (1-min); 996 hPa (mbar)

Ningning developed on September 6. It struck Luzon on September 9 and then entered the South China Sea. Ningning dissipated offshore Vietnam on September 14.

=== Typhoon Violet (Osang) ===
- Very strong typhoon (JMA)
- Category 4 super typhoon (SSHWS)
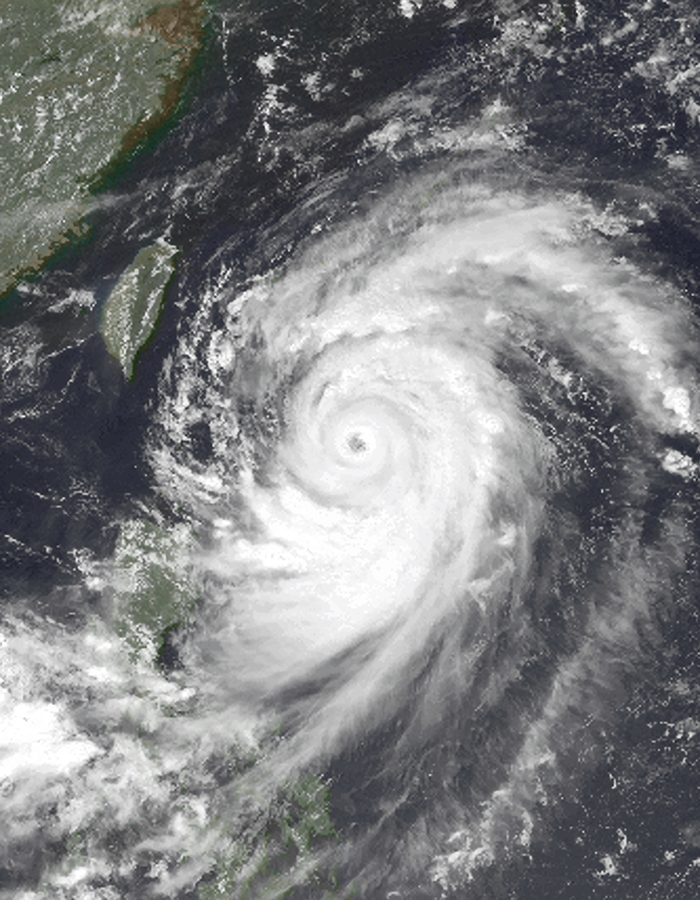
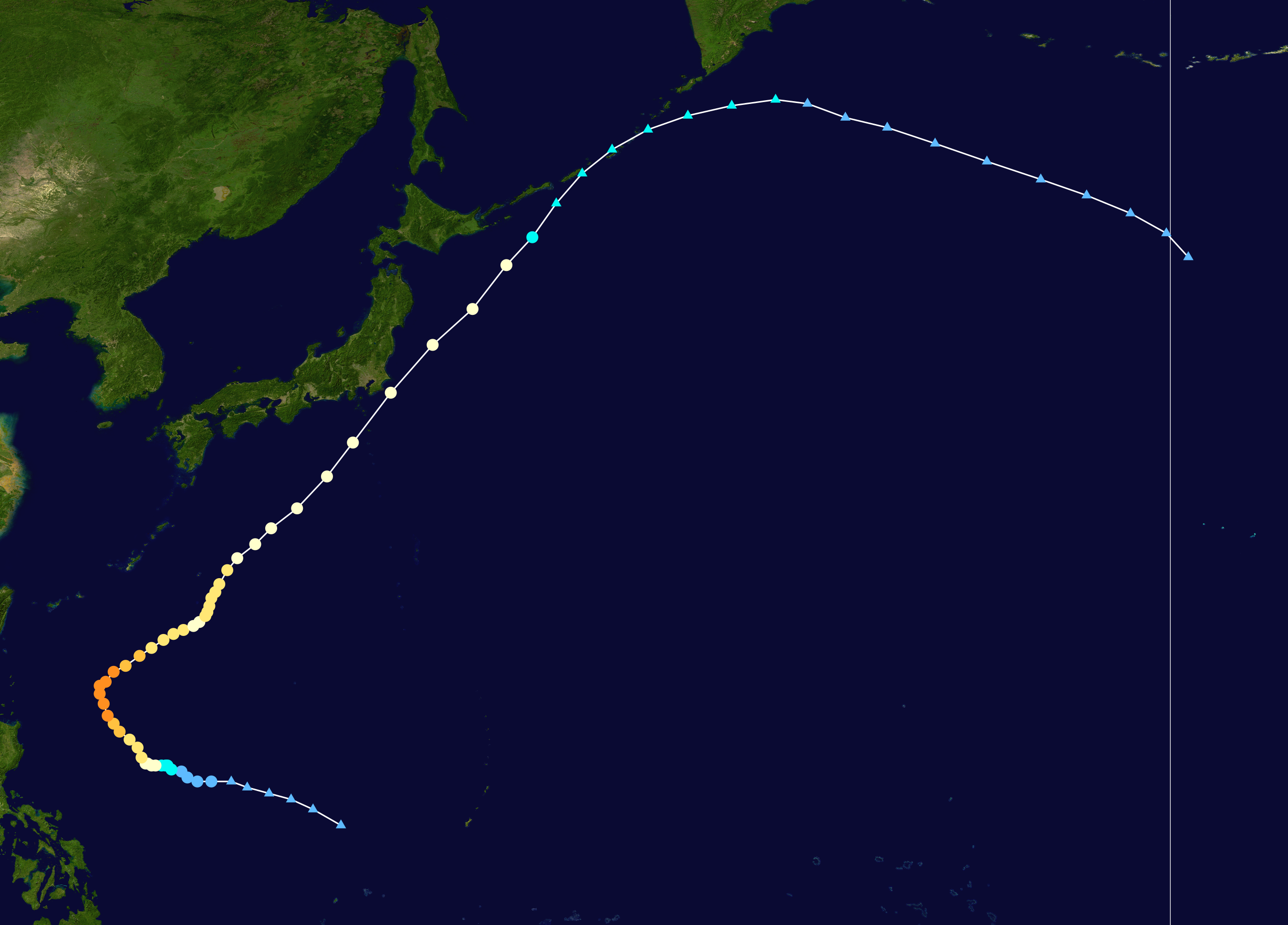
- Duration: September 11 – September 23
- Peak intensity: 165 km/h (105 mph) (10-min); 935 hPa (mbar)

Violet existed from September 11 to September 23. It destroyed 897 homes and damaged 12,226 homes. It caused ¥16.7 billion (US$154 million). Seven people were killed.

=== Typhoon Tom ===
- Typhoon (JMA)
- Category 1 typhoon (SSHWS)
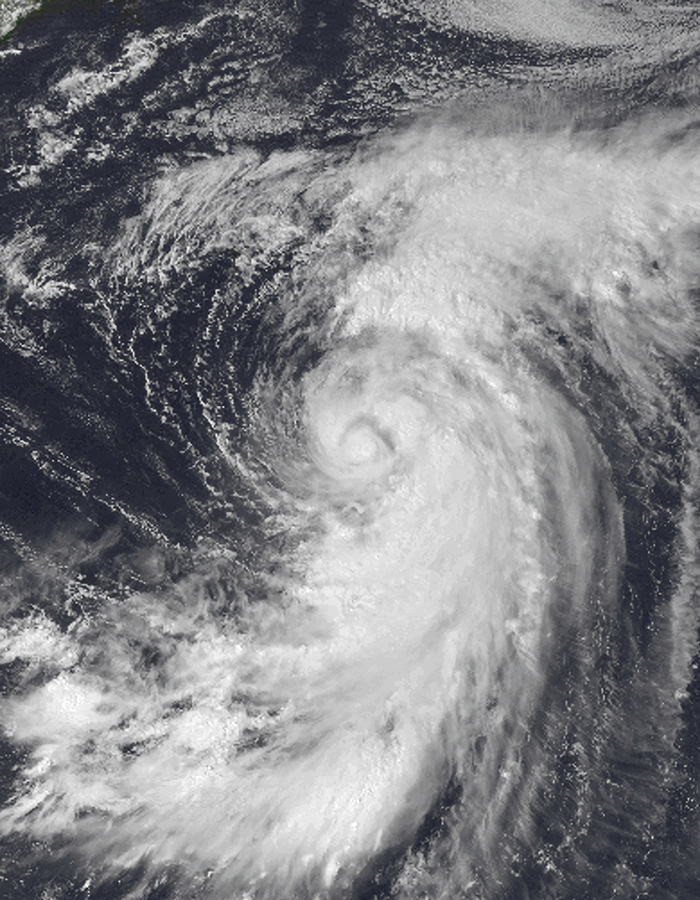
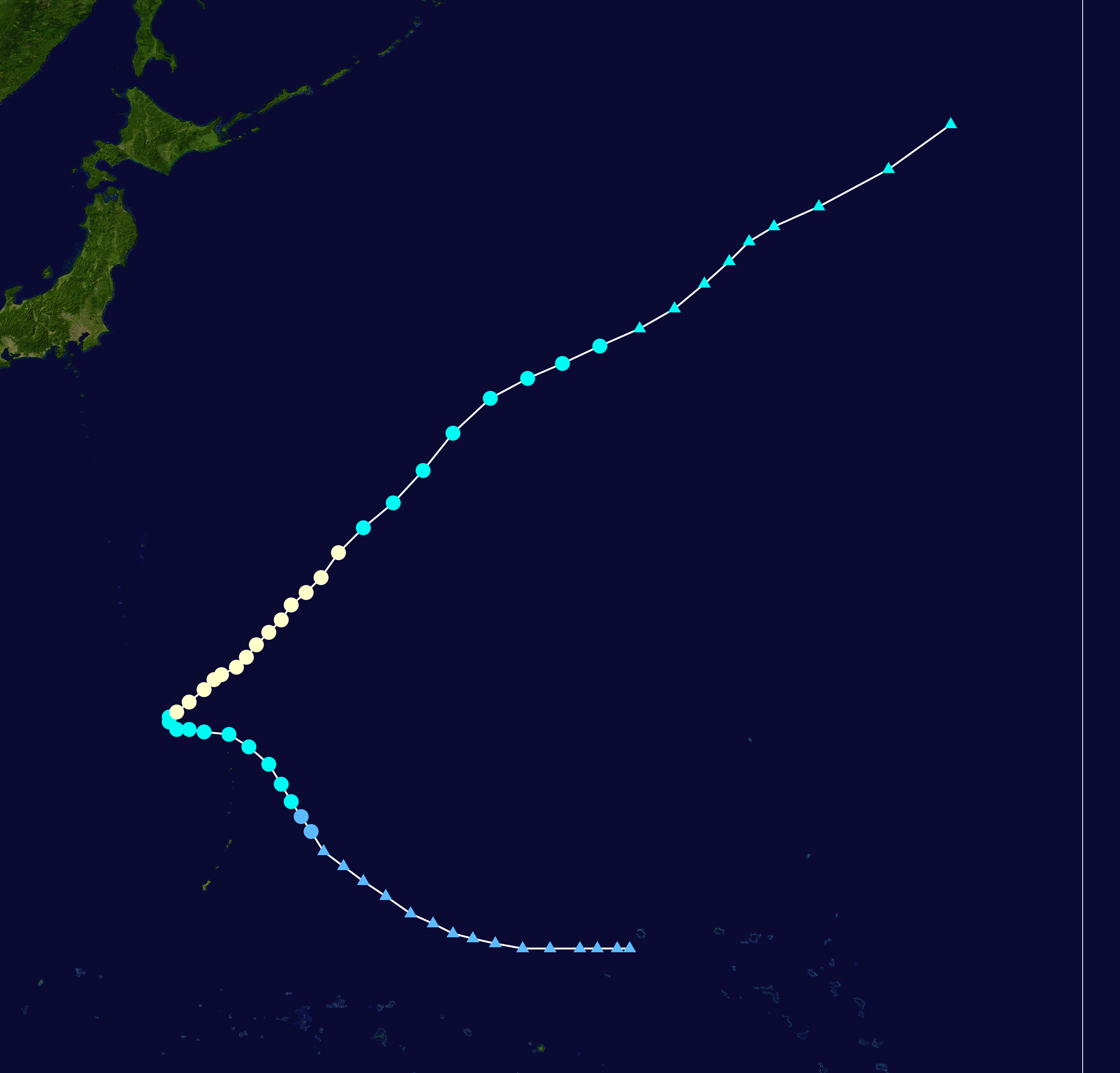
- Duration: September 12 – September 20
- Peak intensity: 130 km/h (80 mph) (10-min); 965 hPa (mbar)

Tom existed from September 11 to September 21.

=== Severe Tropical Storm Willie ===
- Severe tropical storm (JMA)
- Category 1 typhoon (SSHWS)
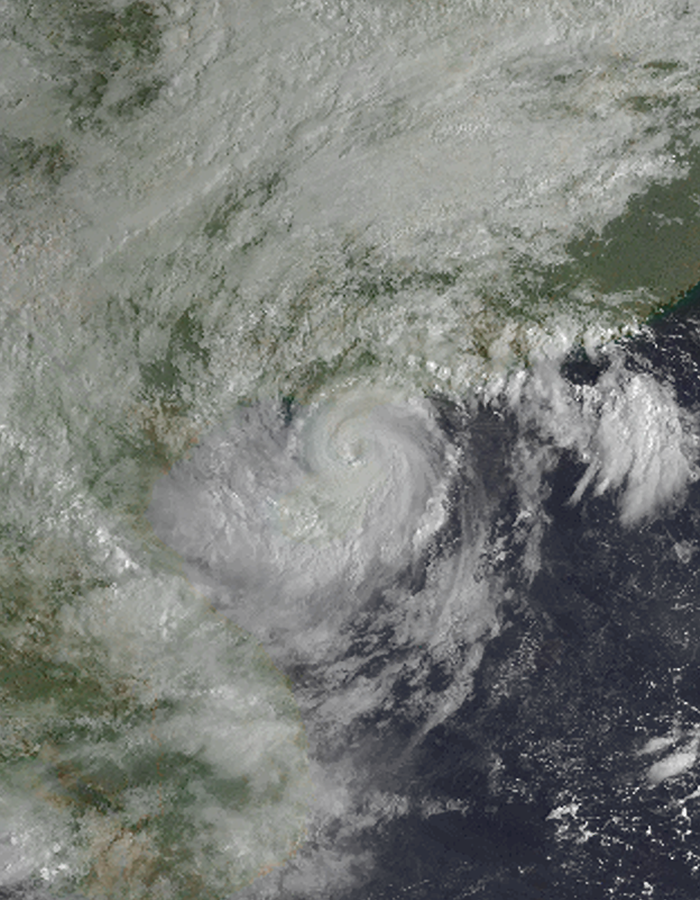
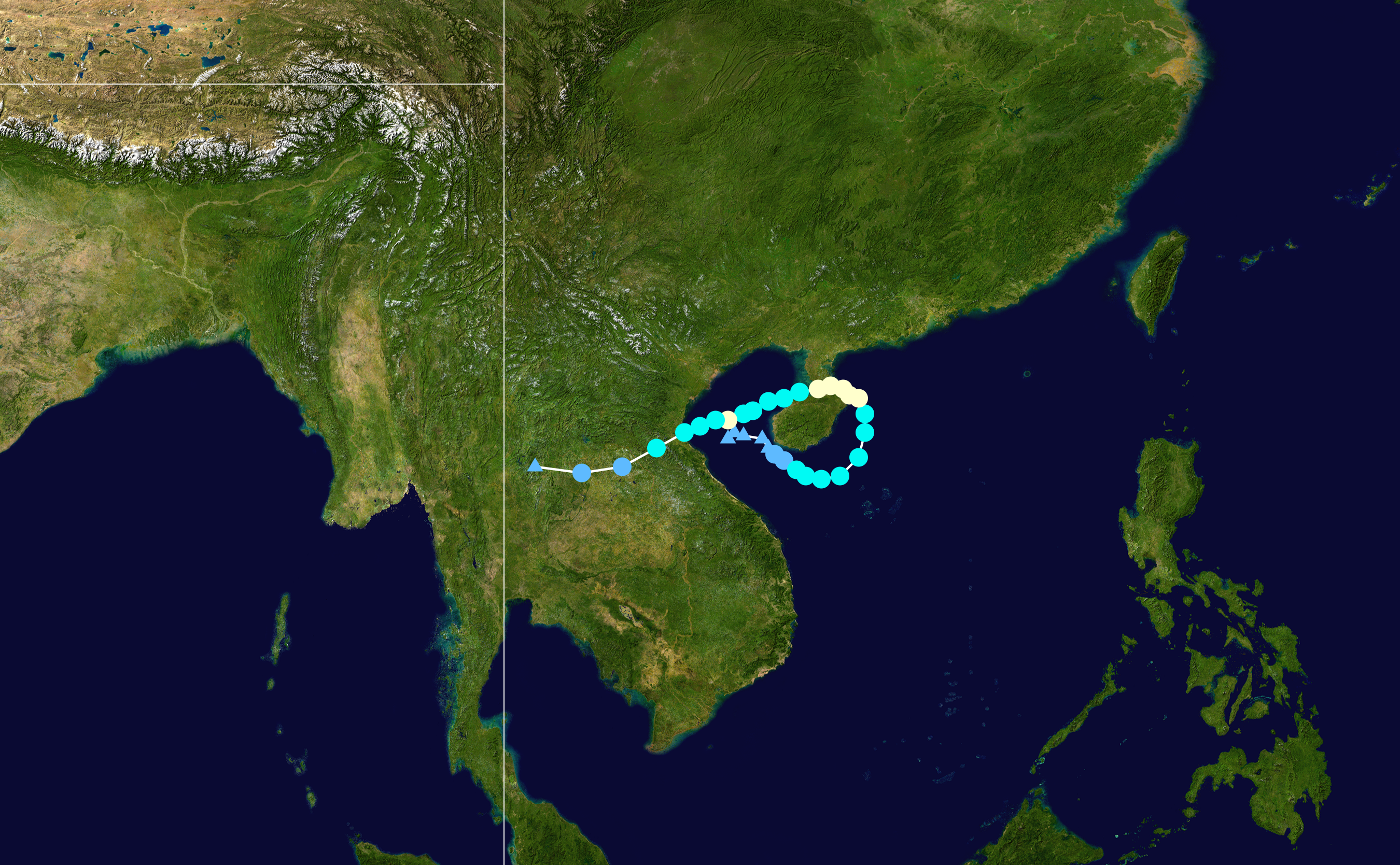
- Duration: September 15 – September 23
- Peak intensity: 100 km/h (65 mph) (10-min); 985 hPa (mbar)

An active monsoon trough that also developed Typhoons Tom (25W) and Violet (26W) spawned a tropical depression in the Gulf of Tonkin on September 16. It moved counter-clockwise around Hainan Island, becoming a tropical storm on the 17th and a typhoon on the 19th. It crossed the narrow Hainan Strait between Hainan and China, and continued west-southwestward across the Gulf of Tonkin. Willie made landfall on Vietnam on the 22nd, and dissipated the next day.

In Hainan province, the storm caused 100 deaths, affected more than 3 million people, collapsed or damaged 76,600 houses and destroyed 211,600 hectares of flowers and crops.

In Vietnam, the storm left 90 people dead and 106 injured. Total damages across the country amounted to 500 billion Vietnamese dong (US$40 million in 1996 dollars).

=== Typhoon Yates ===
- Very strong typhoon (JMA)
- Category 4 super typhoon (SSHWS)
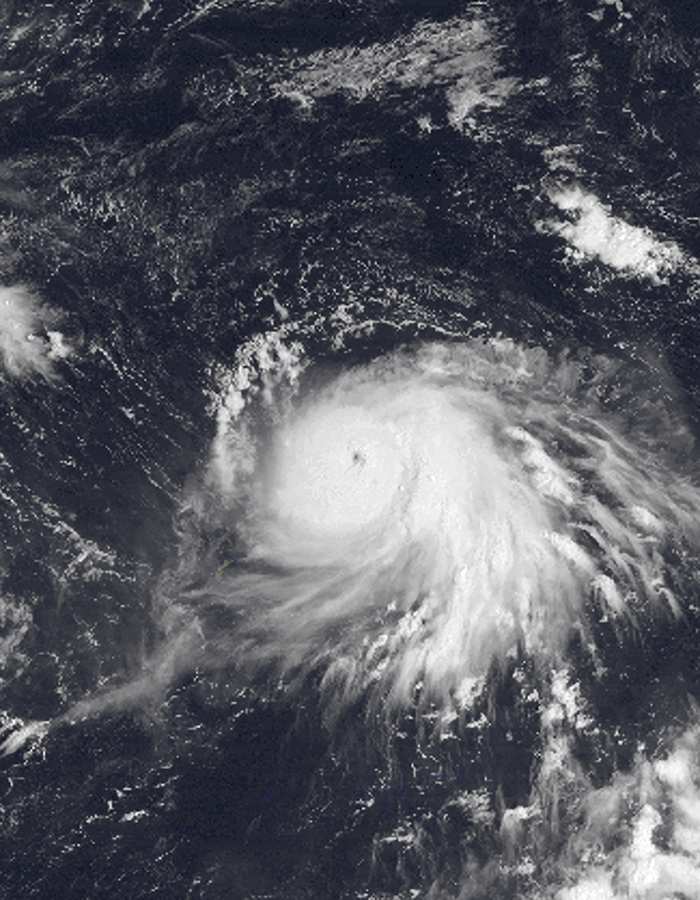
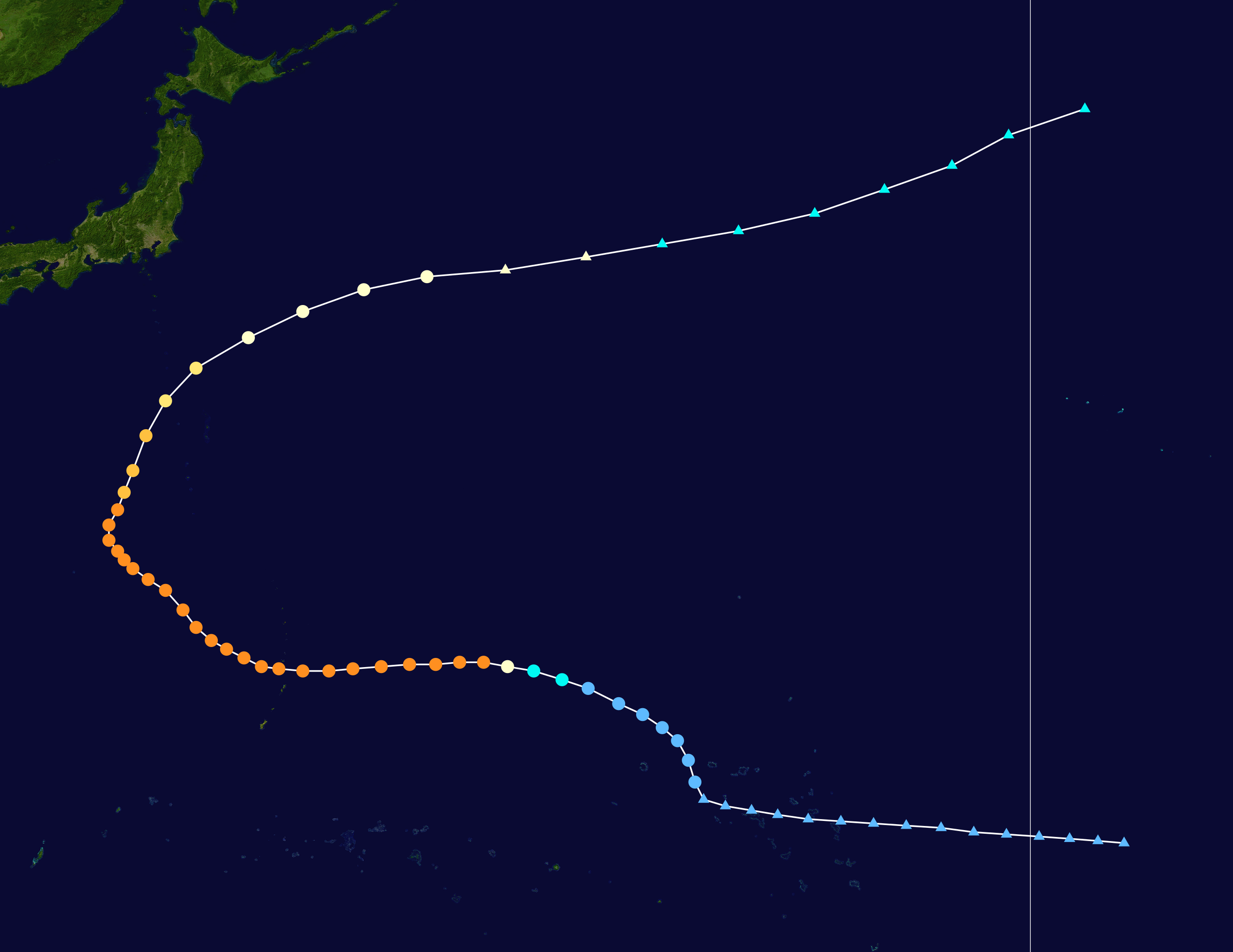
- Duration: September 21 – October 1
- Peak intensity: 165 km/h (105 mph) (10-min); 935 hPa (mbar)

Yates lasted from September 19 to October 1.

=== Typhoon Zane (Paring) ===
- Typhoon (JMA)
- Category 3 typhoon (SSHWS)
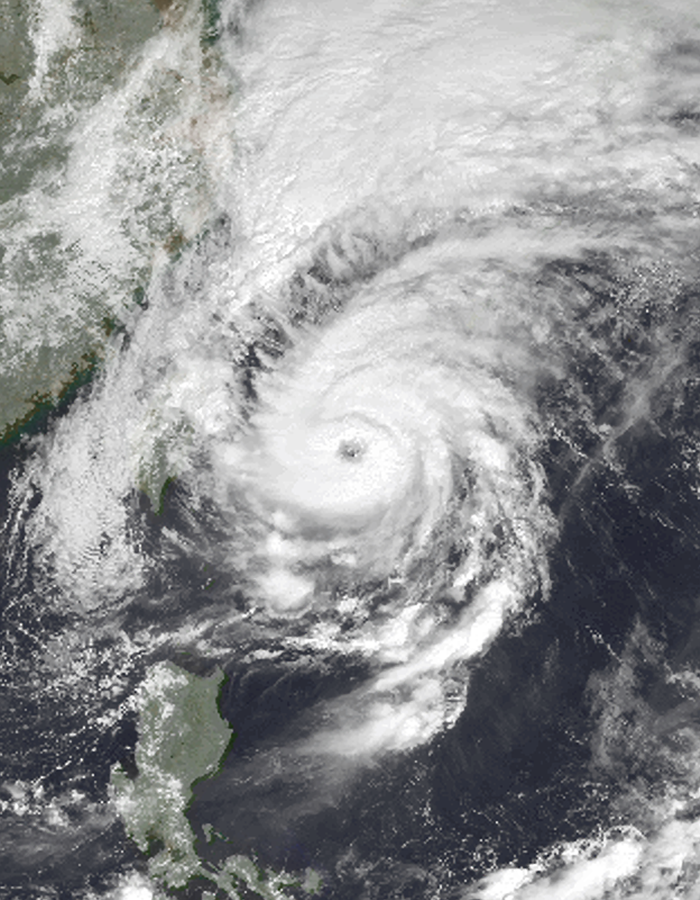
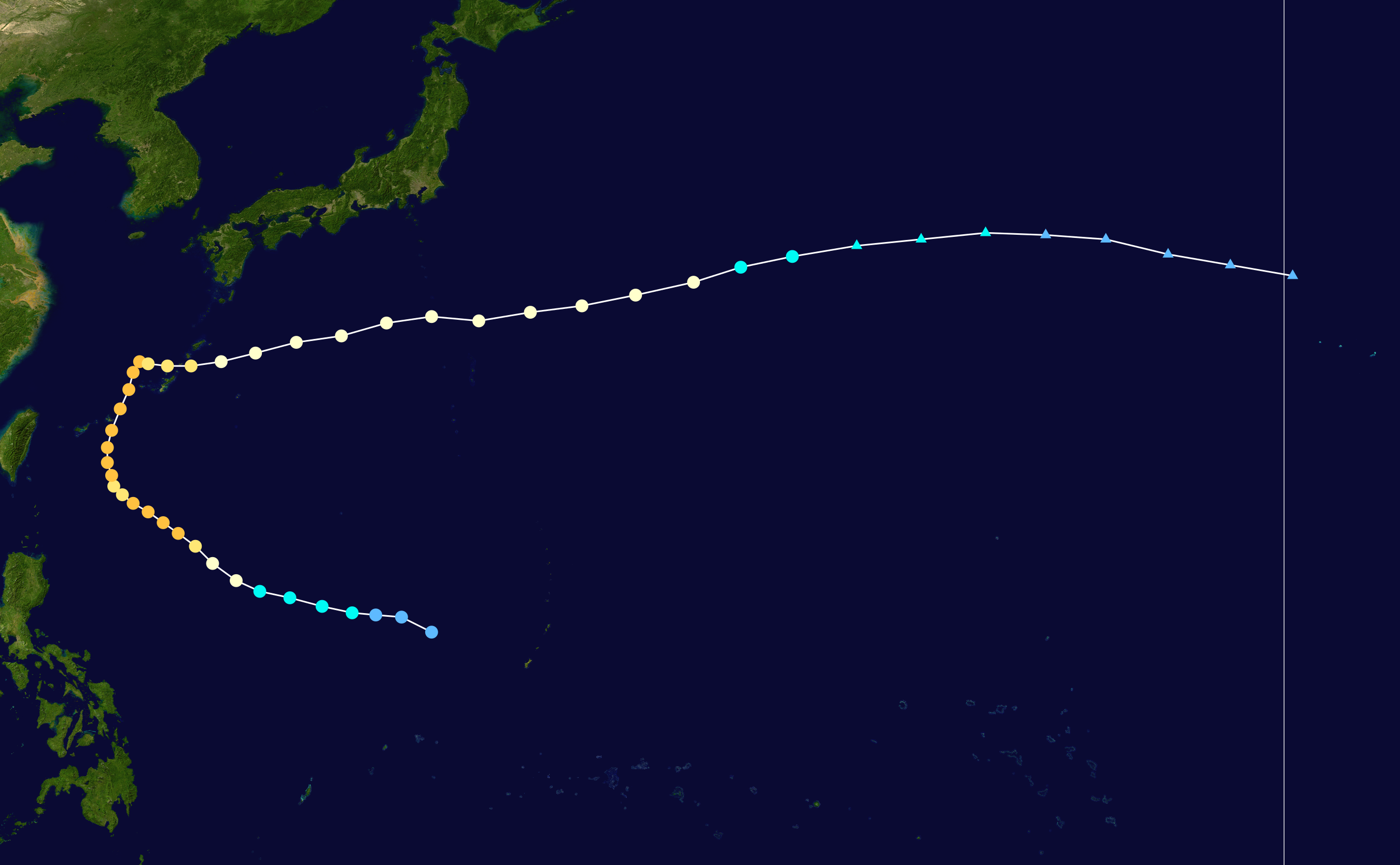
- Duration: September 23 – October 3
- Peak intensity: 150 km/h (90 mph) (10-min); 950 hPa (mbar)

Zane originated from the same monsoon trough as Yates. The larger area of the monsoon trough to the west began exhibiting deep convection, thus becoming Tropical Depression 29W on September 24. Later that day, the depression was upgraded into Tropical Storm Zane. Moving northwestward, Zane intensified into a typhoon as it approached the Ryukyu Islands. Zane reached its peak on September 29 as it abruptly moved eastwardly. Westerly shear began exposing Zane as it transitioned into an extratropical cyclone on October 3. Over Miyako Island, damage totaled to JP¥153.4 million (US$1.4 million). Over Kagoshima Prefecture, damage totaled to JP¥1.018 billion (US$9.1 million).

=== Tropical Depression Abel (Reming) ===
- Tropical depression (JMA)
- Tropical storm (SSHWS)
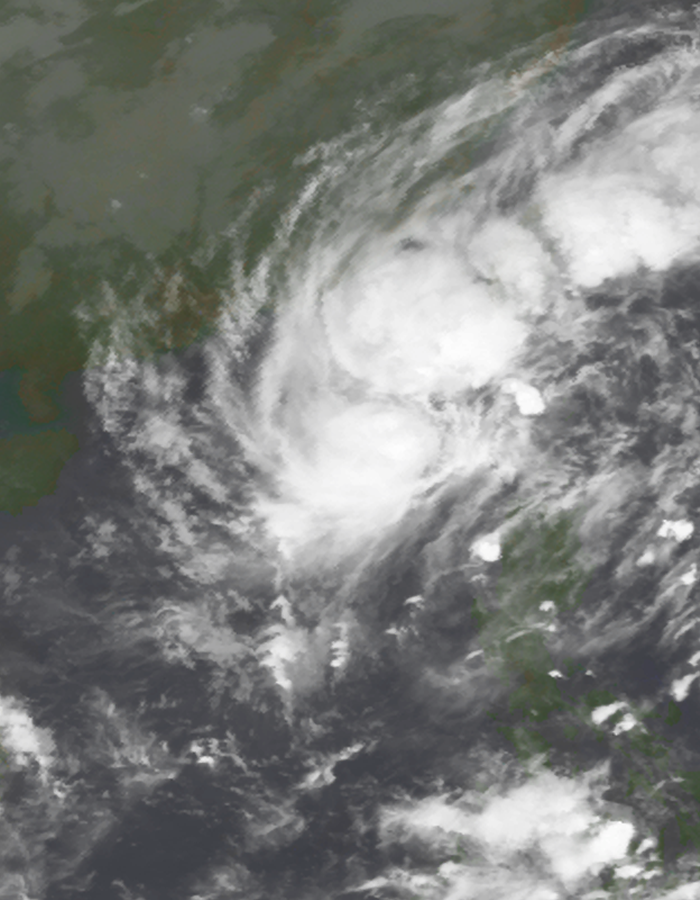
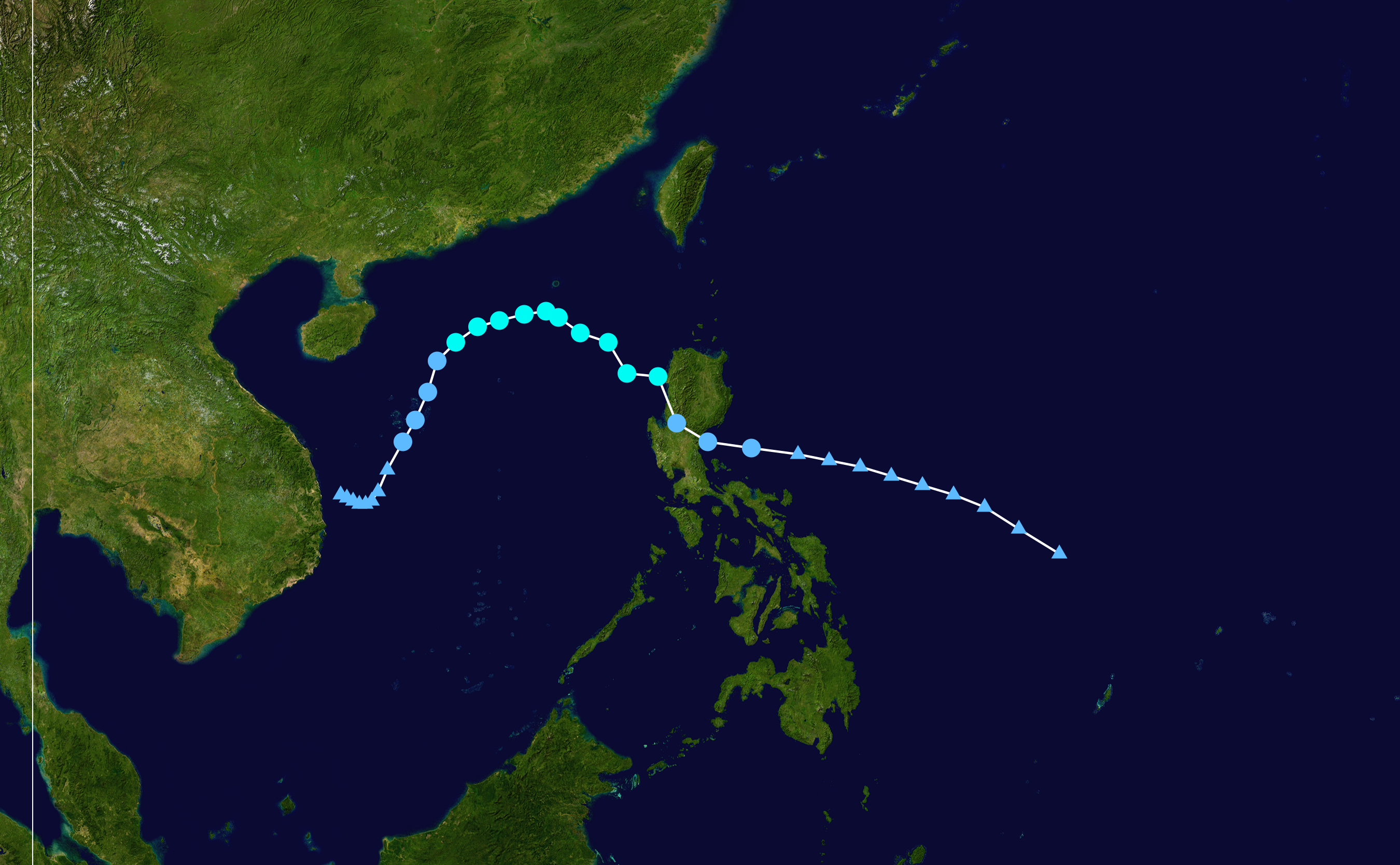
- Duration: October 10 – October 17
- Peak intensity: 95 km/h (60 mph) (1-min); 1002 hPa (mbar)

In the Philippines, Abel killed eight people, left seven others missing and caused $4.3 million (1996 USD, $6.4 million 2013 USD) in damages.

=== Tropical Depression 31W ===
- Tropical depression (JMA)
- Tropical depression (SSHWS)
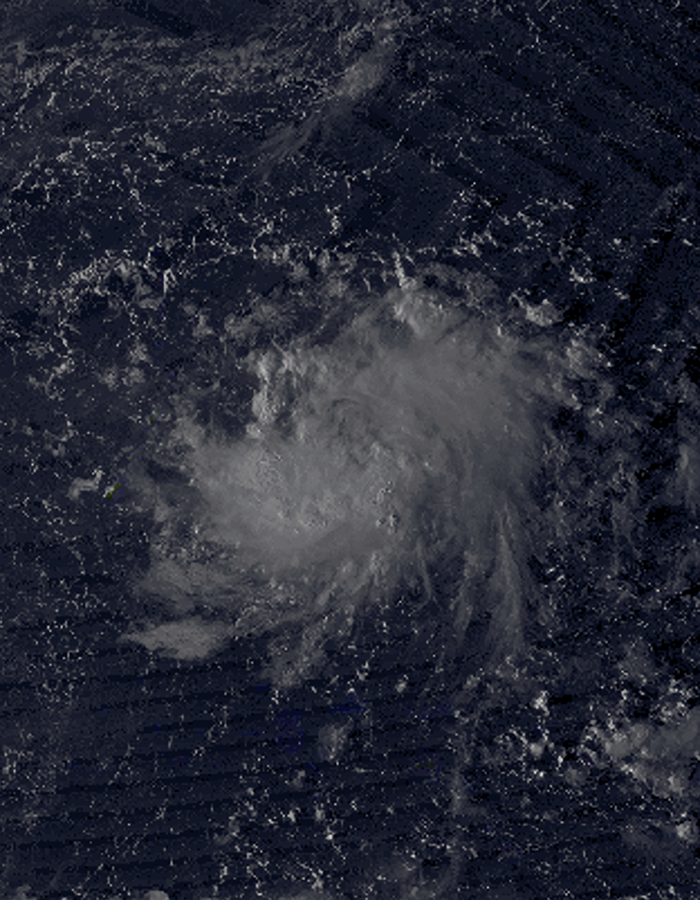
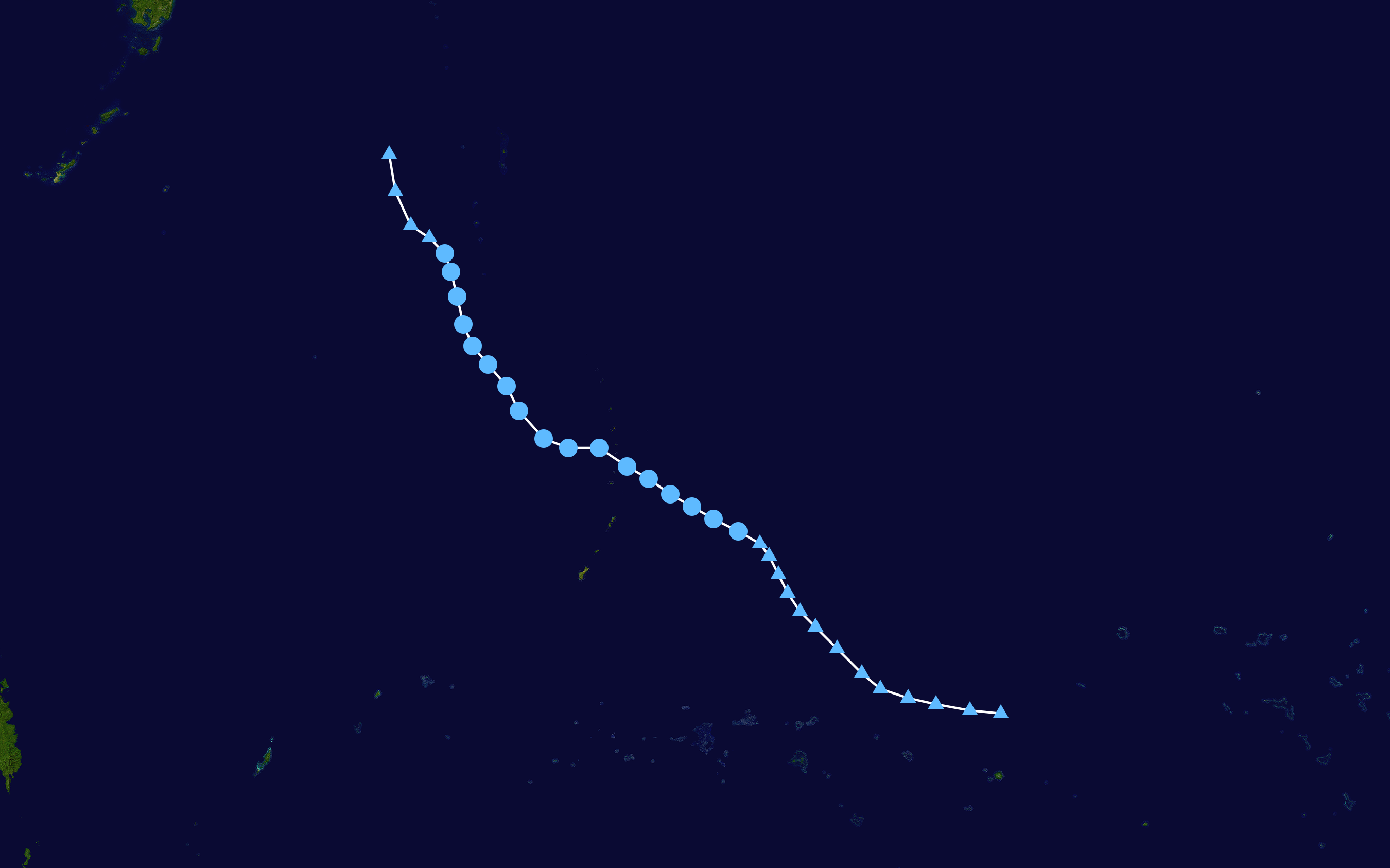
- Duration: October 15 – October 16
- Peak intensity: 45 km/h (30 mph) (1-min); 1006 hPa (mbar)

Tropical Depression 31W existed from October 13 to October 17.

=== Severe Tropical Storm Beth (Seniang) ===
- Severe tropical storm (JMA)
- Category 2 typhoon (SSHWS)
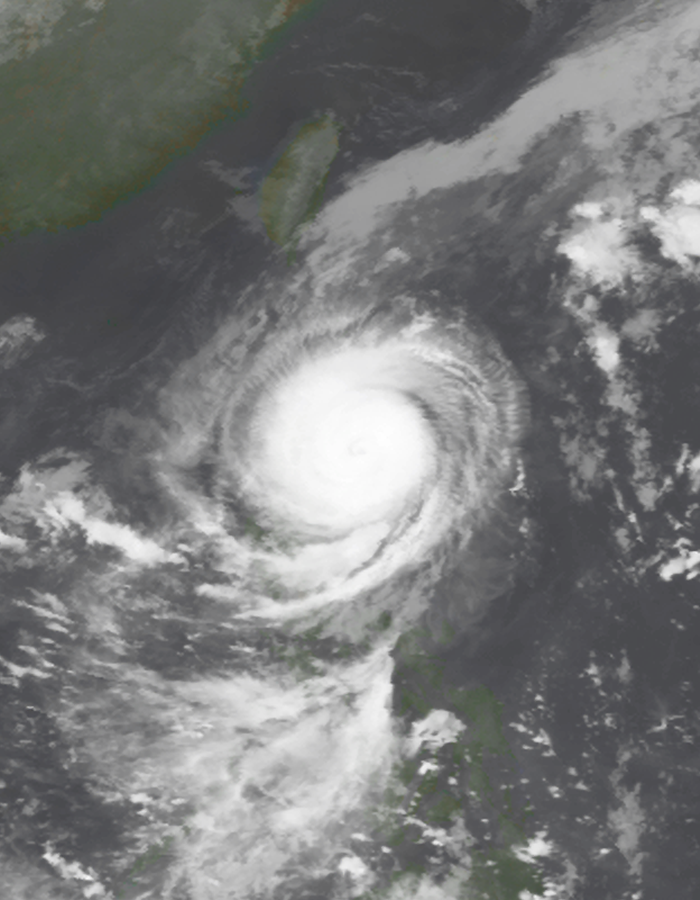
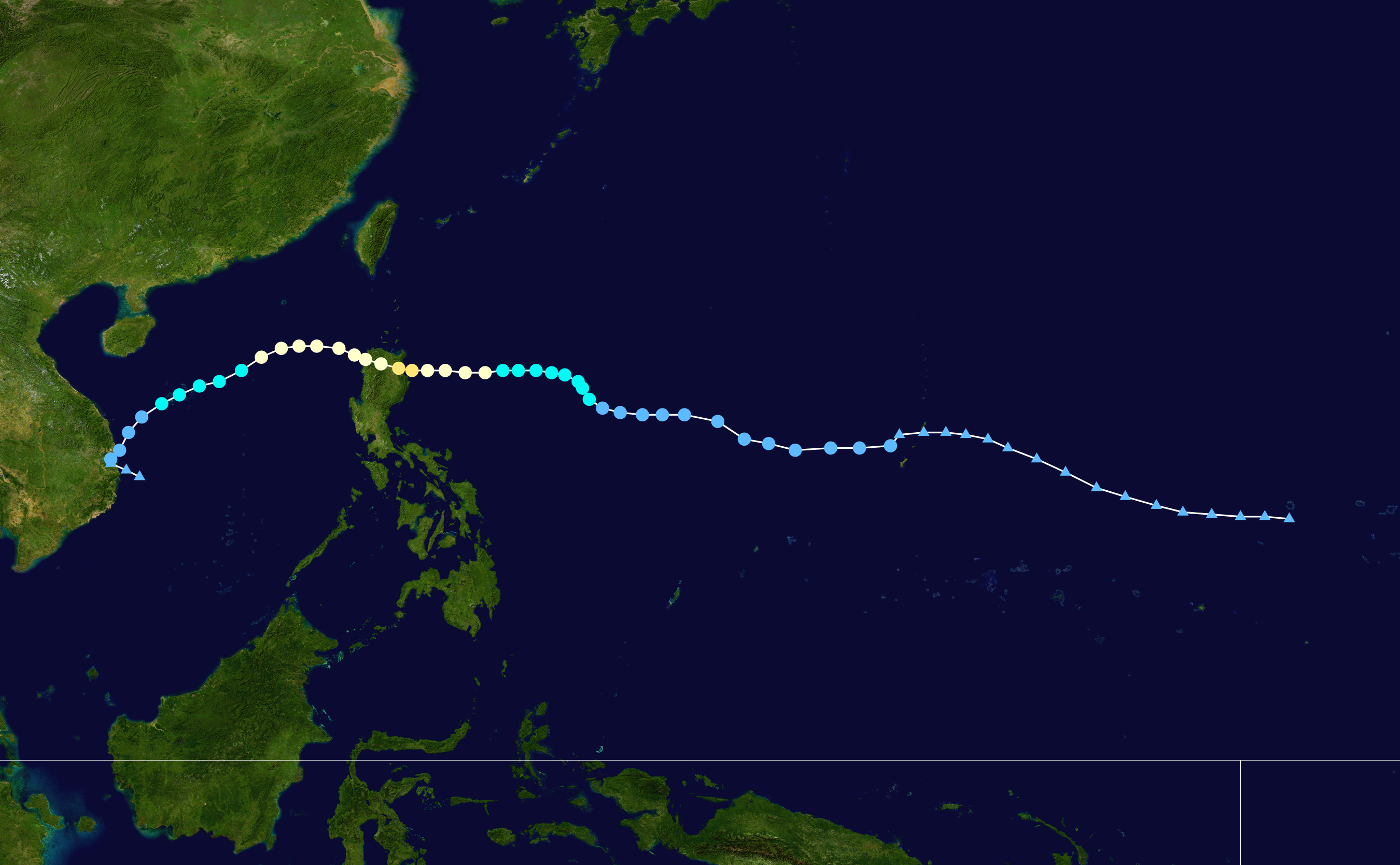
- Duration: October 11 – October 22
- Peak intensity: 110 km/h (70 mph) (10-min); 975 hPa (mbar)

Beth developed on October 13. It struck Luzon on October 17 and then reached the South China Sea. On October 21, Beth moved ashore in Vietnam and dissipated the next day. One person had drowned in northern Philippines, in the province of Ifugao, while another four remained missing in another province. The PAGASA recorded sustained winds of 120 km/h (75 mph) as the storm impacted the northeastern portion of Cagayan. Three people were killed.

=== Typhoon Carlo ===
- Typhoon (JMA)
- Category 3 typhoon (SSHWS)
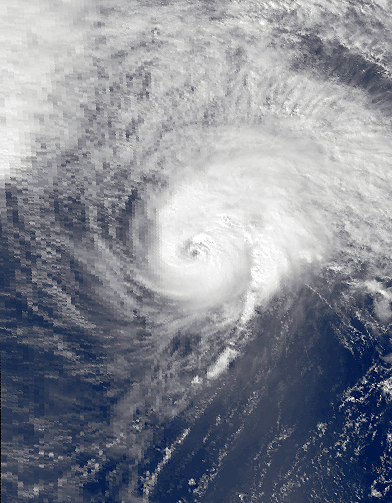
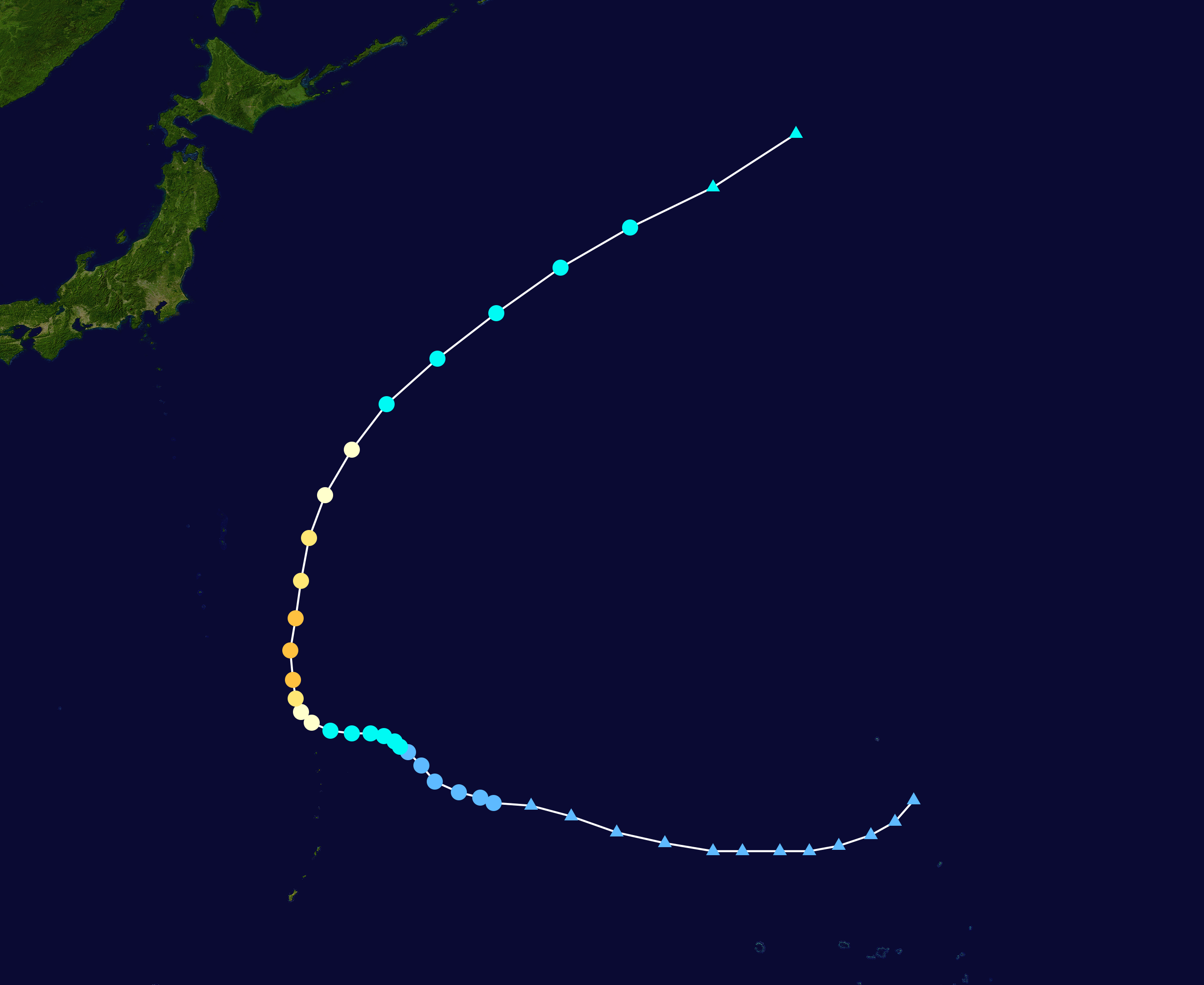
- Duration: October 20 – October 26
- Peak intensity: 130 km/h (80 mph) (10-min); 965 hPa (mbar)

Carlo existed from October 20 to October 26.

=== Tropical Depression 34W ===
- Tropical depression (SSHWS)
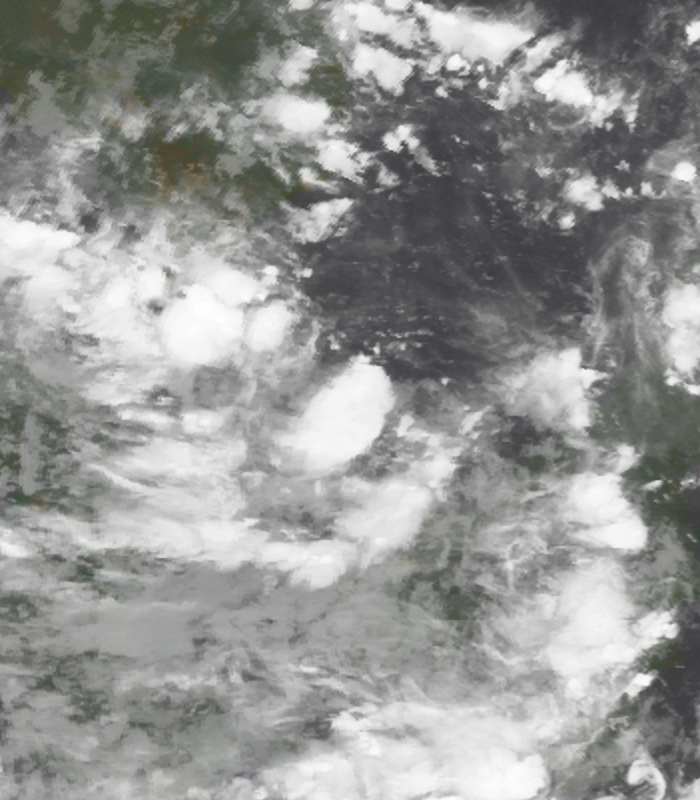
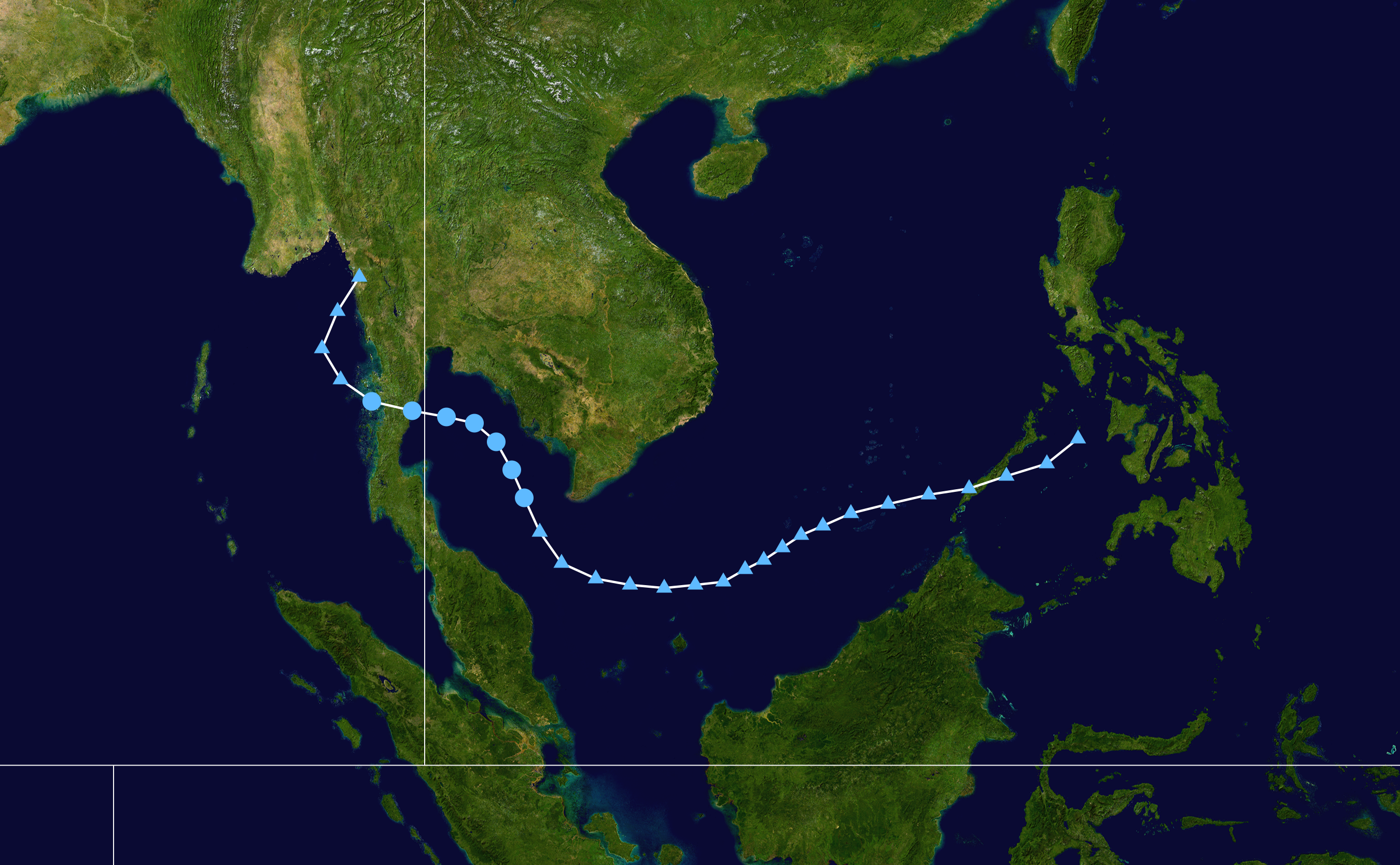
- Duration: October 24 – October 30 (Exited basin)
- Peak intensity: 55 km/h (35 mph) (1-min); 1000 hPa (mbar)

Tropical Depression 34W formed over the Sulu Sea on October 24. It struck Palawan on the next day. After tracking across the South China Sea, 34W made landfall in Thailand on October 30. It crossed the Malay Peninsula and entered the North Indian Ocean basin later that day. The storm dissipated shortly thereafter, but later re-developing into the Andhra Pradesh cyclone.

=== Tropical Depression 35W ===
- Tropical depression (JMA)
- Tropical storm (SSHWS)
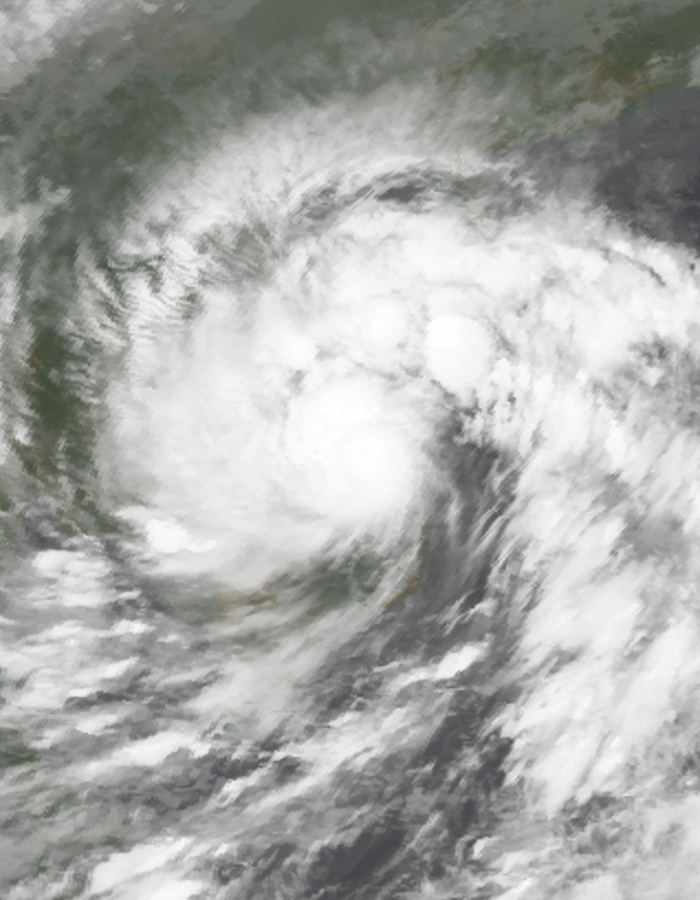
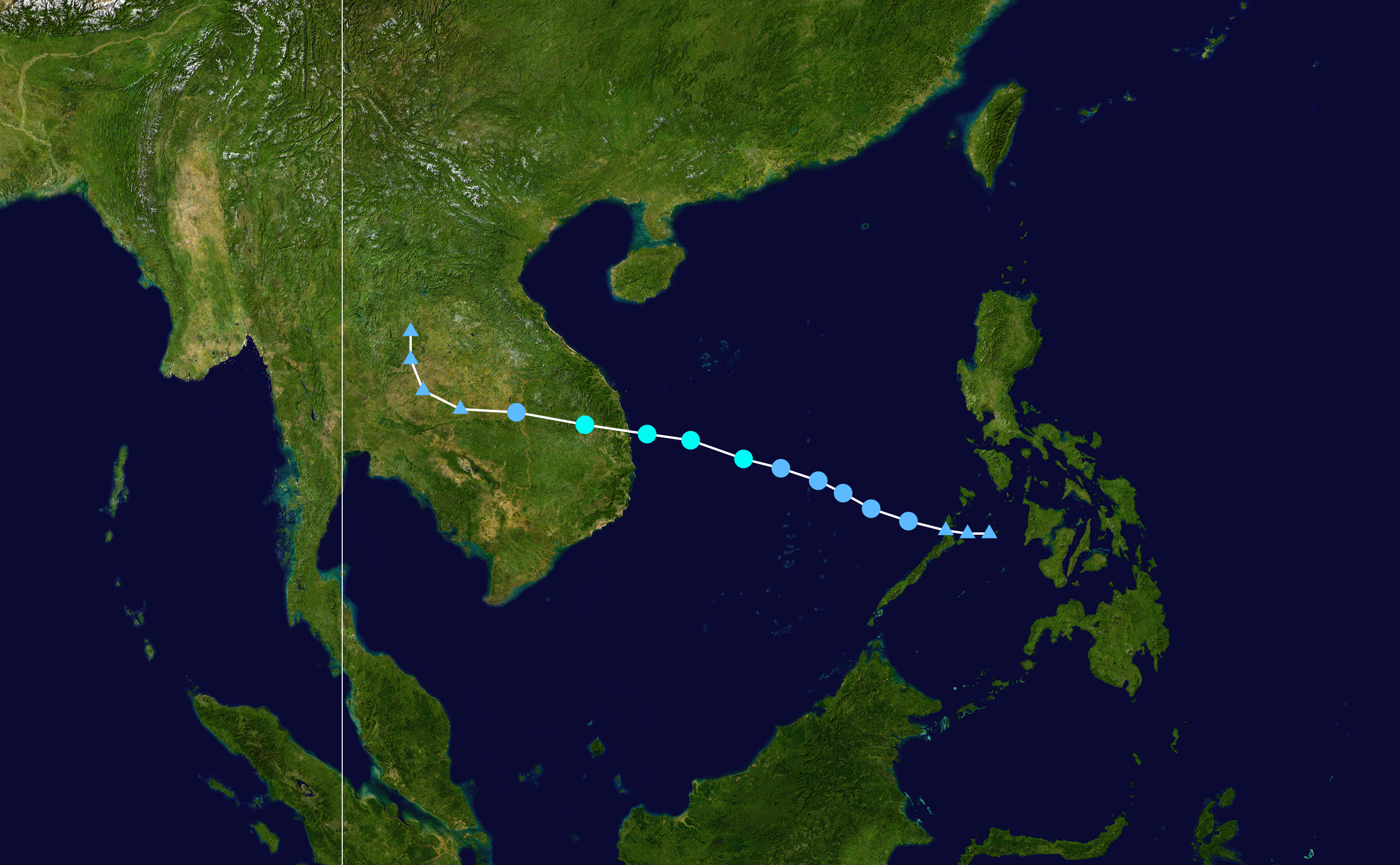
- Duration: November 1 – November 3
- Peak intensity: 75 km/h (45 mph) (1-min); 998 hPa (mbar)

35W killed 60 people and caused $138 million in damages.

=== Typhoon Dale (Ulpiang) ===
- Very strong typhoon (JMA)
- Category 5 super typhoon (SSHWS)
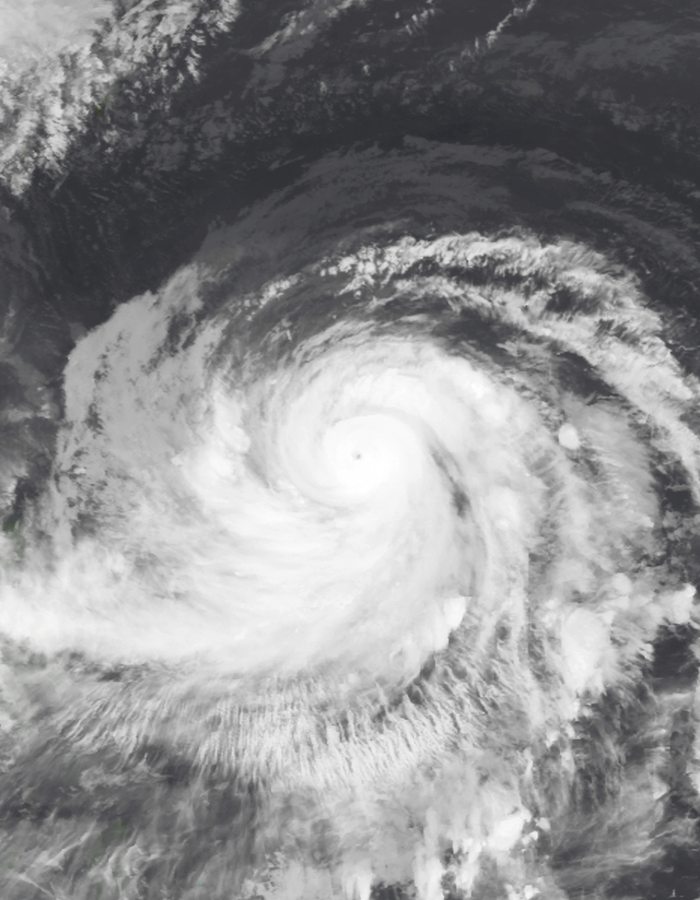
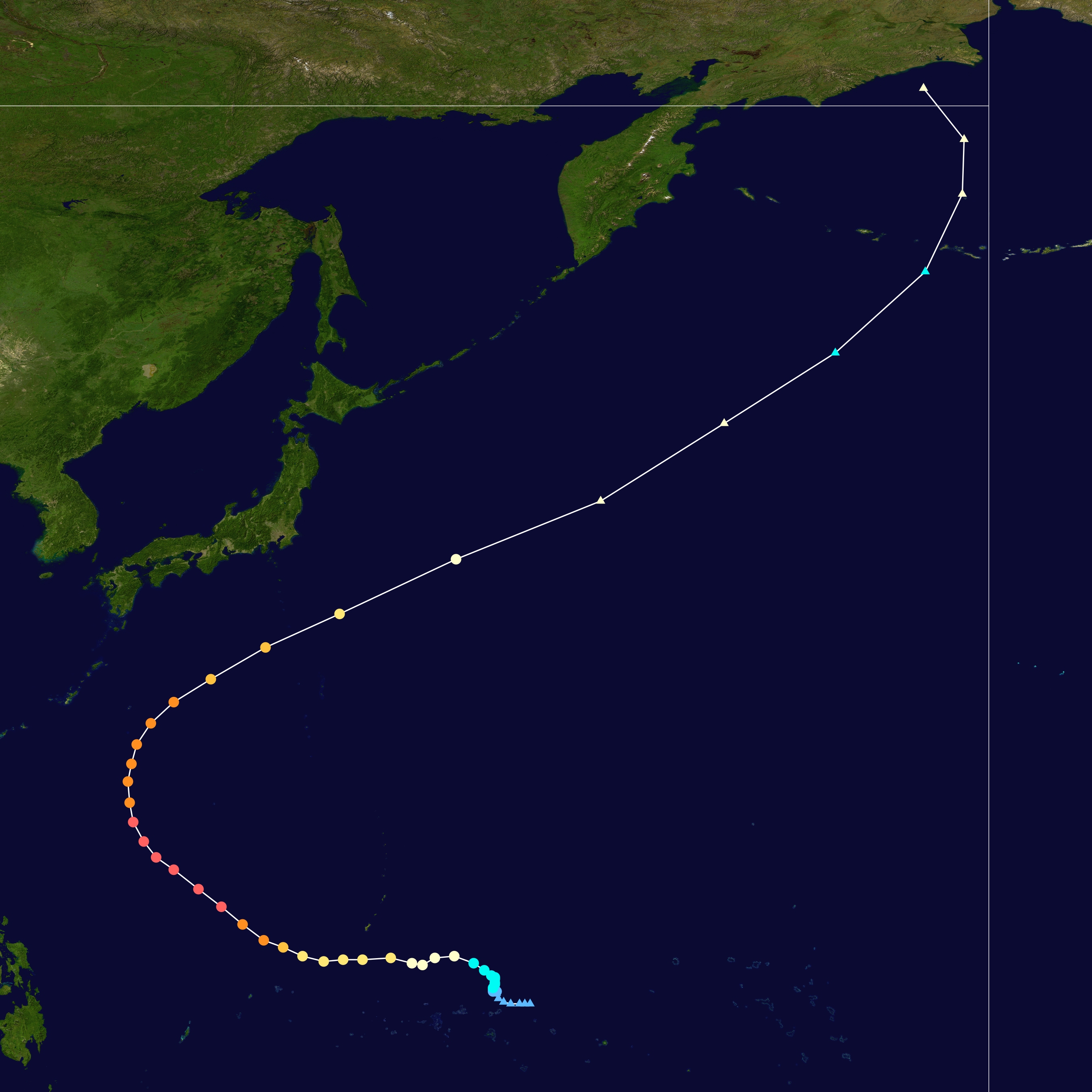
- Duration: November 3 – November 13
- Peak intensity: 165 km/h (105 mph) (10-min); 930 hPa (mbar)

A cluster of thunderstorm activity formed southeast of Guam on November 2. The system slowly organized, becoming a tropical depression on November 4. Remaining nearly stationary, the depression intensified into a tropical storm late in the day. The cyclone then turned westward, becoming a typhoon by November 7. Late in the day, Dale passed south of Guam bringing winds as high as 74 knots (137 km/h) and high seas which overtopped cliffs 30 metres (98 ft) high. Damage on the island totaled US$3.5 million (1996 dollars.) Continuing to intensify, Dale became a supertyphoon in the Philippine Sea on November 9. On November 10, Dale turned north, recurving east of the Philippines. On November 14, Dale accelerated east-northeast at more than 60 knots (110 km/h) as it became an extratropical cyclone.

=== Tropical Storm Ernie (Toyang) ===
- Tropical storm (JMA)
- Tropical storm (SSHWS)
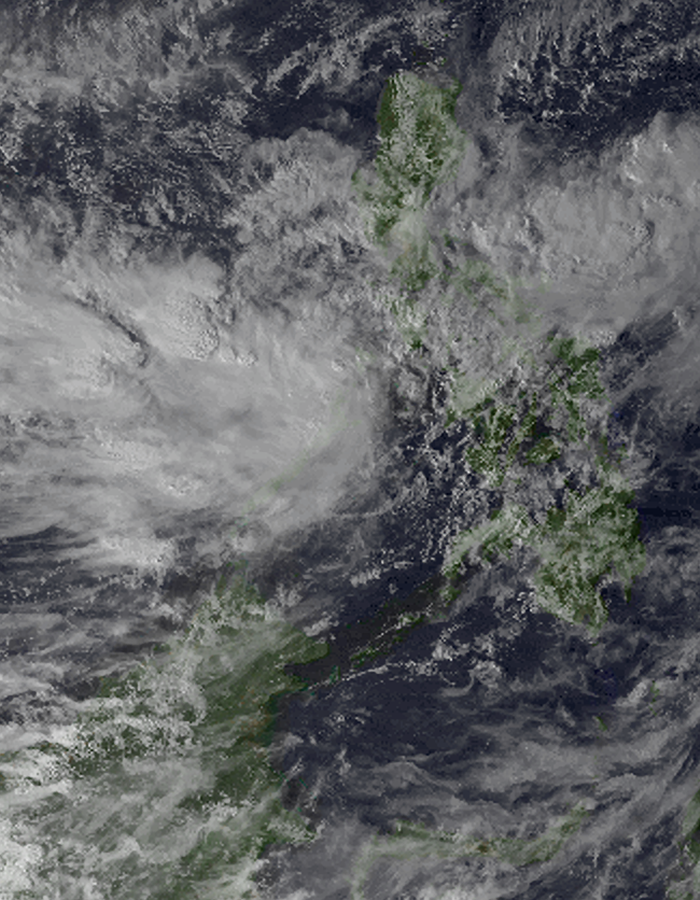
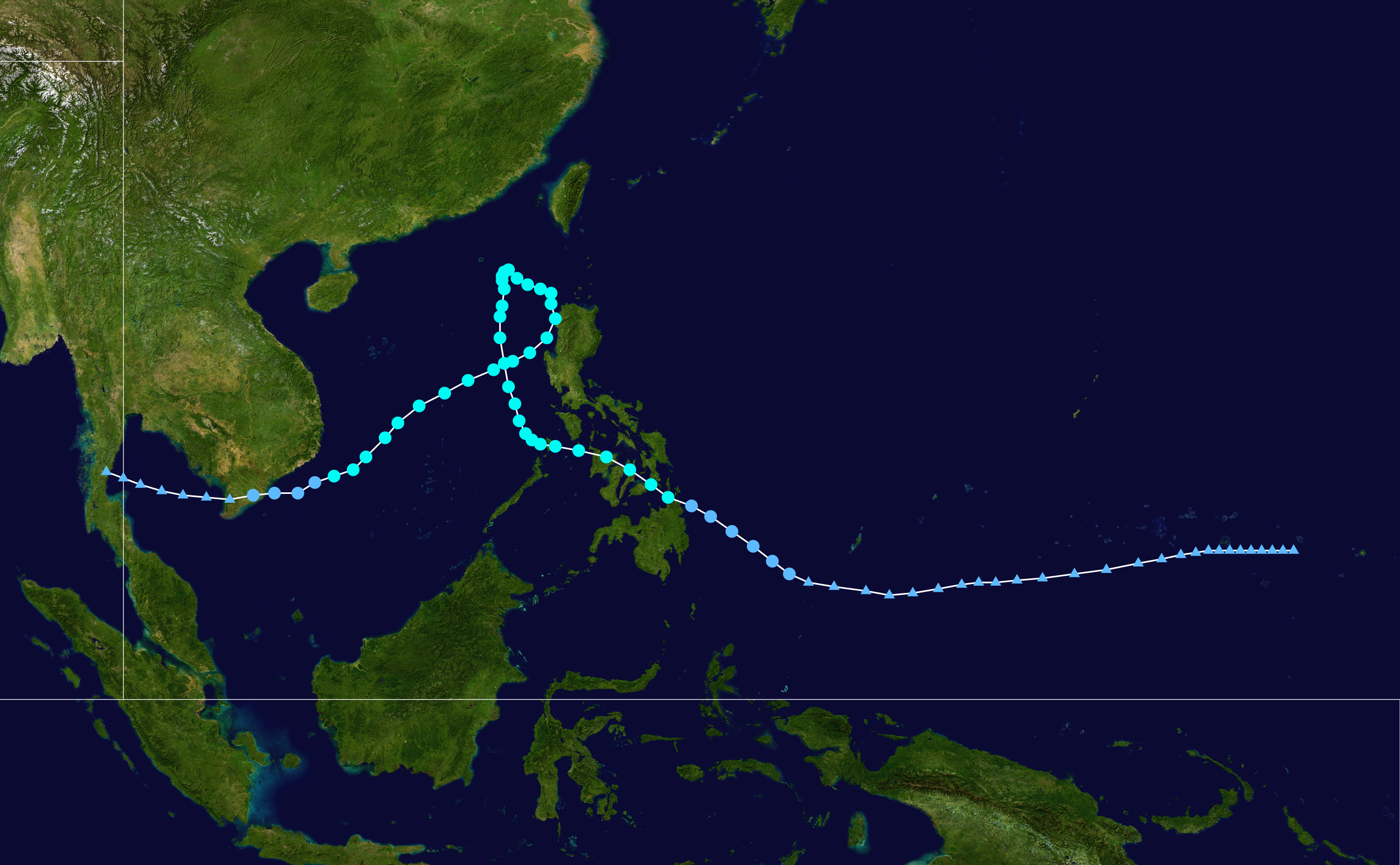
- Duration: November 4 – November 19
- Peak intensity: 75 km/h (45 mph) (10-min); 989 hPa (mbar)

In the Philippines, Ernie killed 24 people, left 12 others missing and caused $5.1 million in damages.

=== Tropical Storm 38W ===
- Tropical depression (JMA)
- Tropical storm (SSHWS)
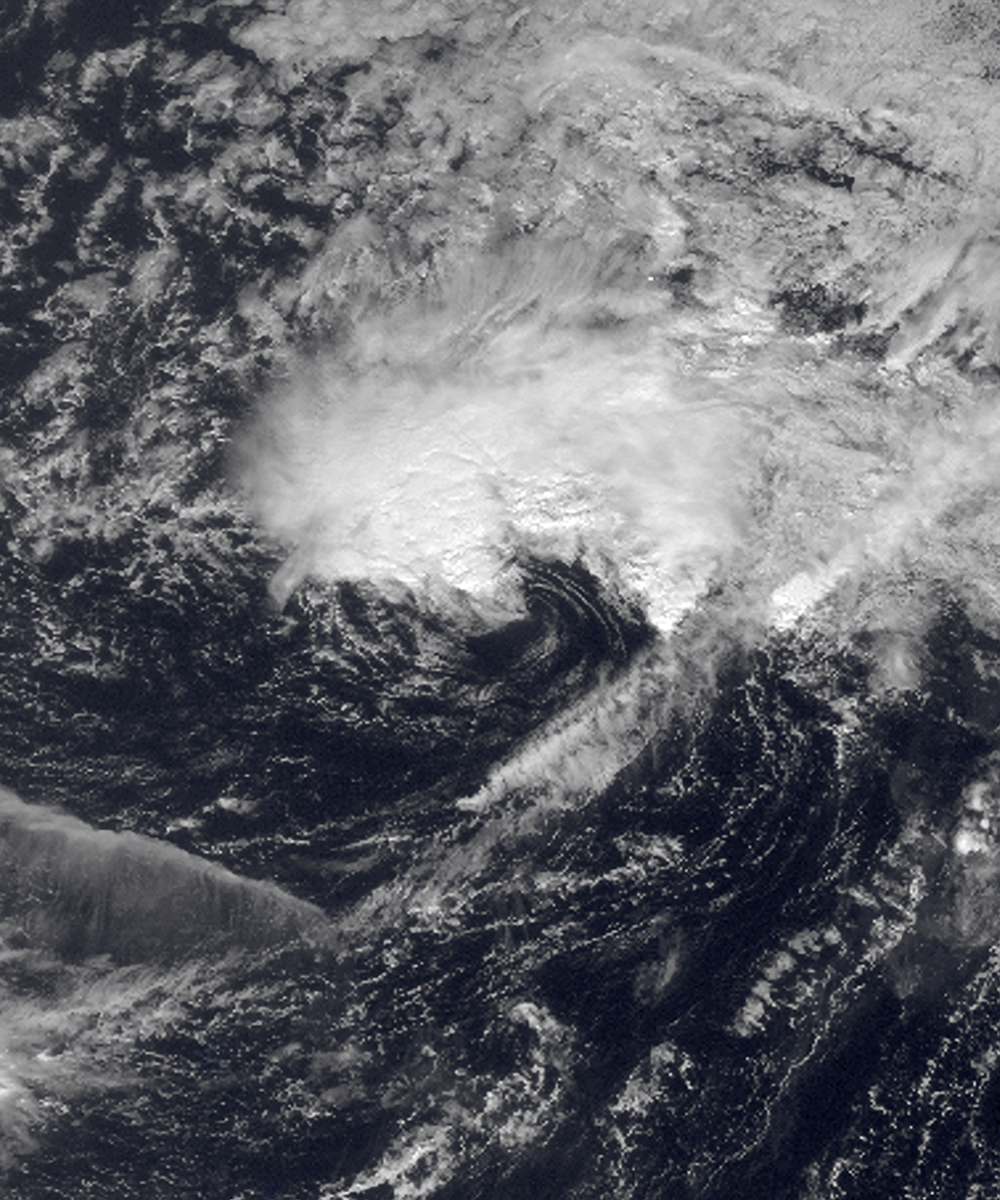
- Duration: November 5 – November 8
- Peak intensity: 95 km/h (60 mph) (1-min); 1000 hPa (mbar)

Low Pressure Area Formed On November 3 At The Middle Of Central Pacific Entered Western Pacific Basin Later That Next Day November 4 And Formed As Tropical Depression 38W By November 5 But It Lasted 3 Days It Became Tropical Storm No Name Were Assigned Since JMA(Japan Meteorological Agency) Stopped Monitoring The System Later On November 8 It Dissipated

=== Tropical Depression 39W ===
- Tropical depression (SSHWS)
- Tropical depression (SSHWS)
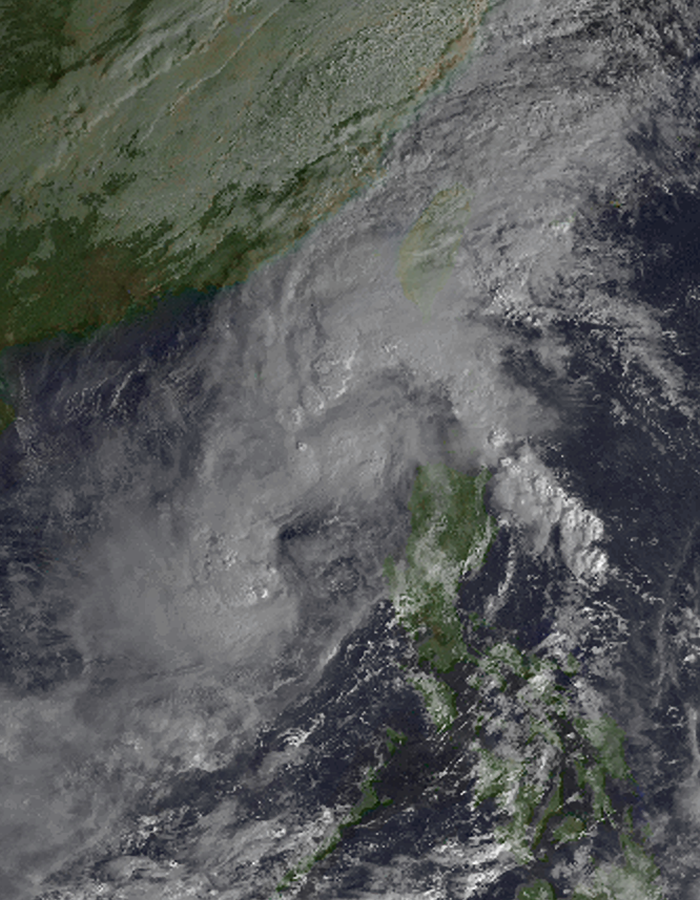
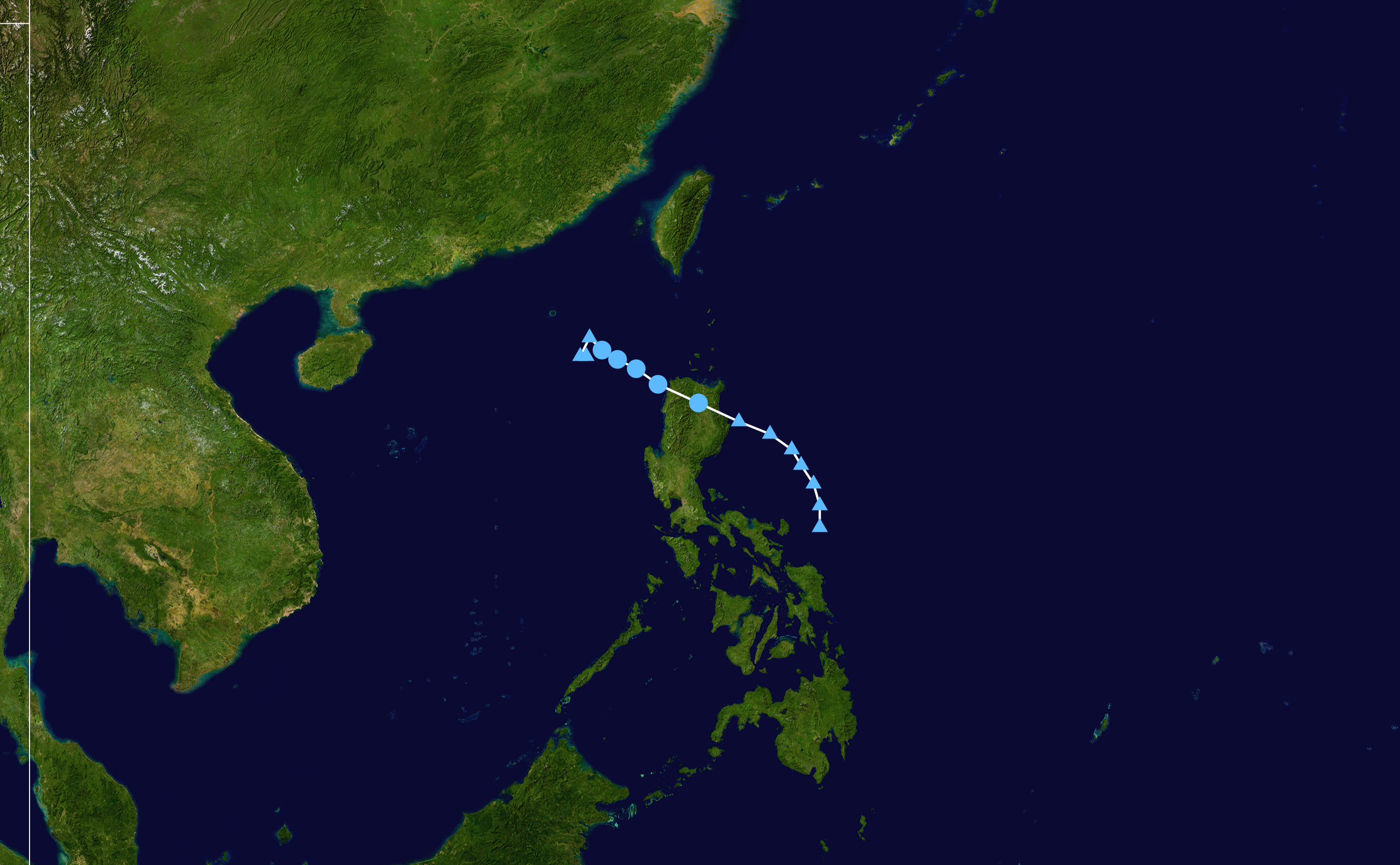
- Duration: November 7 – November 8
- Peak intensity: 55 km/h (35 mph) (1-min); 1006 hPa (mbar)

Tropical Depression 39W developed on November 6. It struck Luzon on November 8 and then dissipated two days later.

=== Tropical Depression 40W ===
- Tropical depression (JMA)
- Tropical depression (SSHWS)
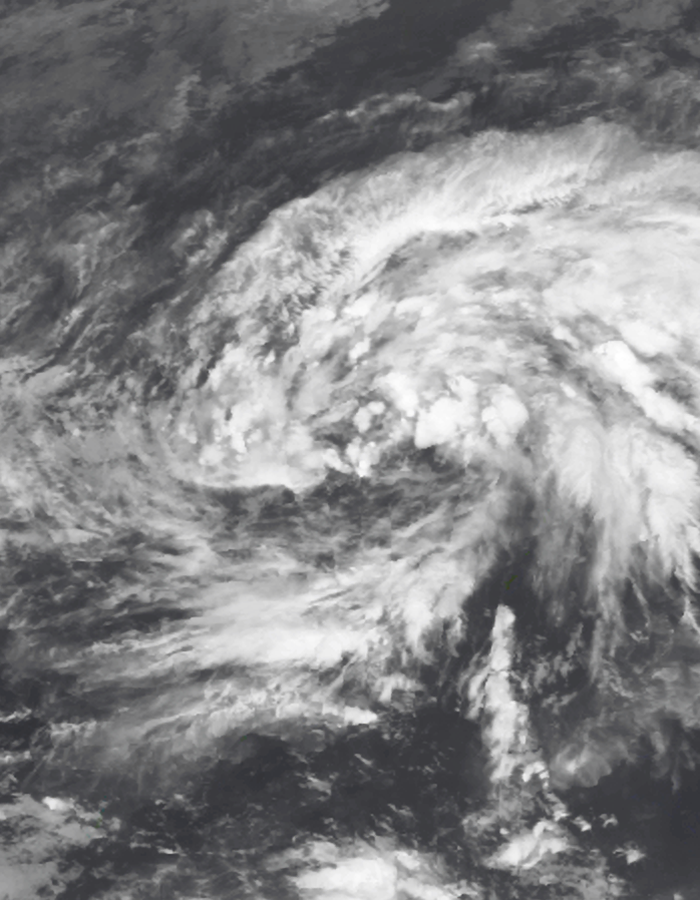
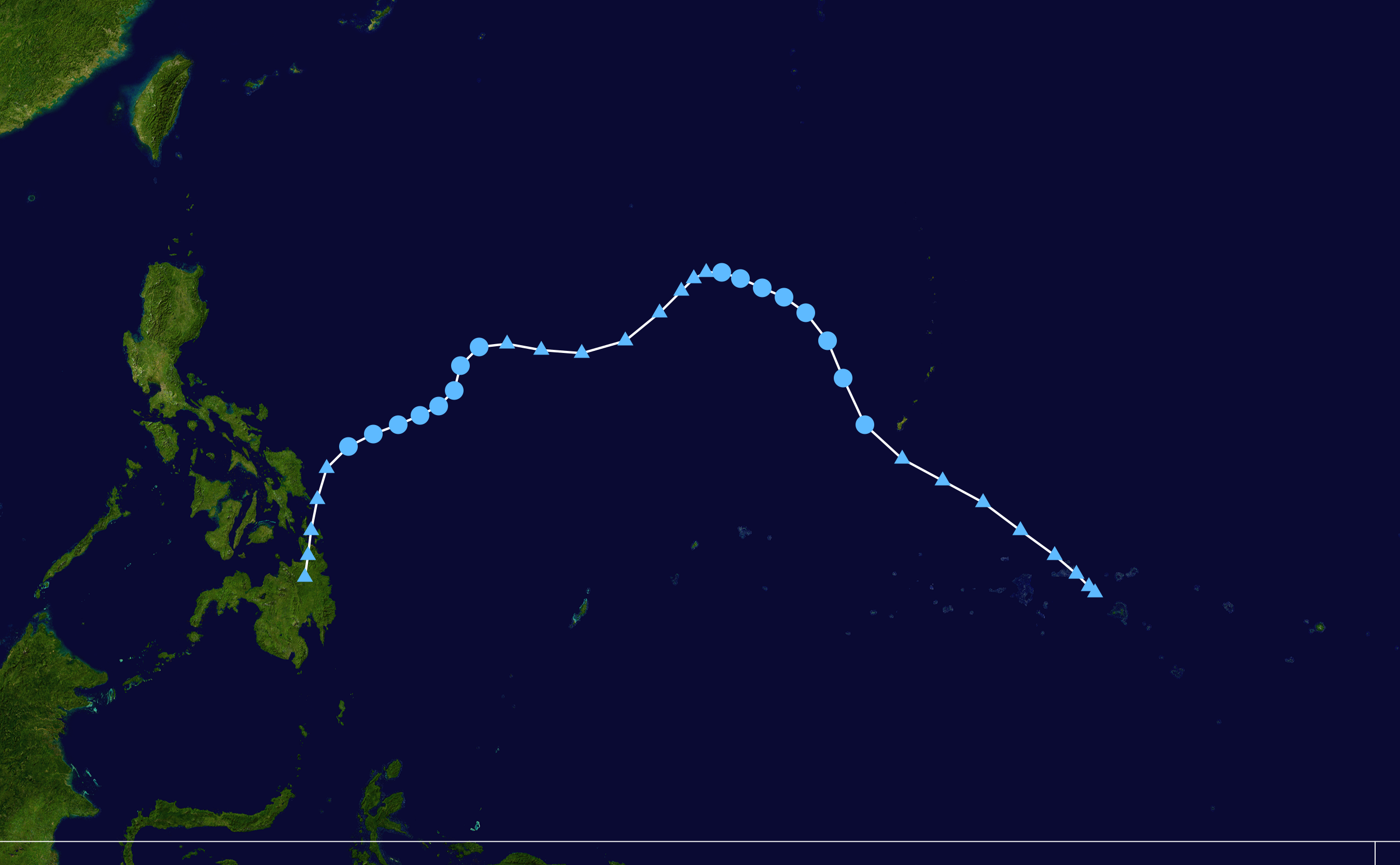
- Duration: November 24 – November 26
- Peak intensity: 45 km/h (30 mph) (1-min); 1002 hPa (mbar)

Tropical Depression 40W developed on November 25. It struck Mindanao several hours before dissipating on November 30.

=== Tropical Depression 41W ===
- Tropical depression (SSHWS)
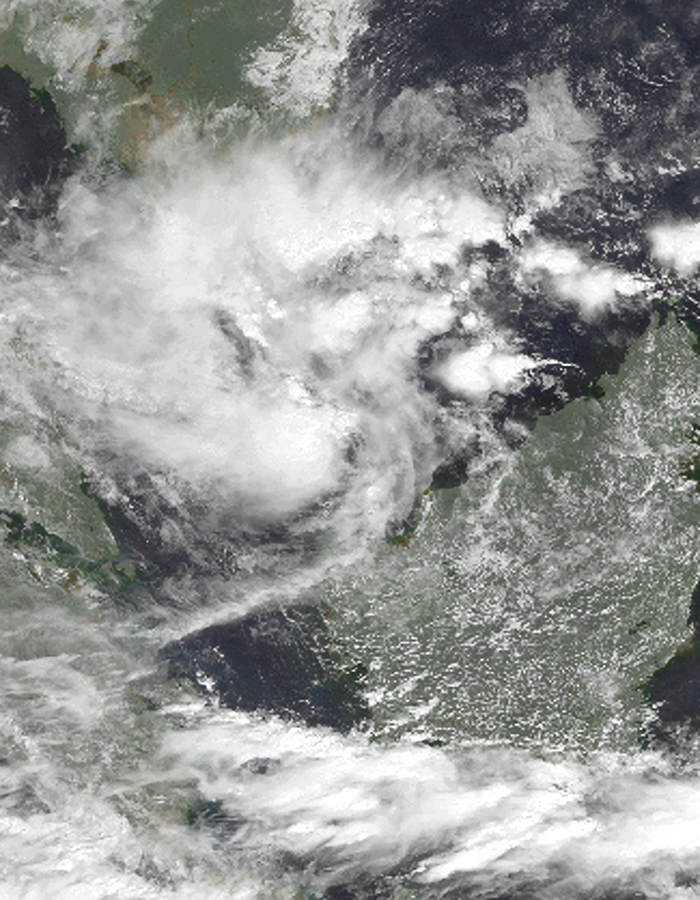
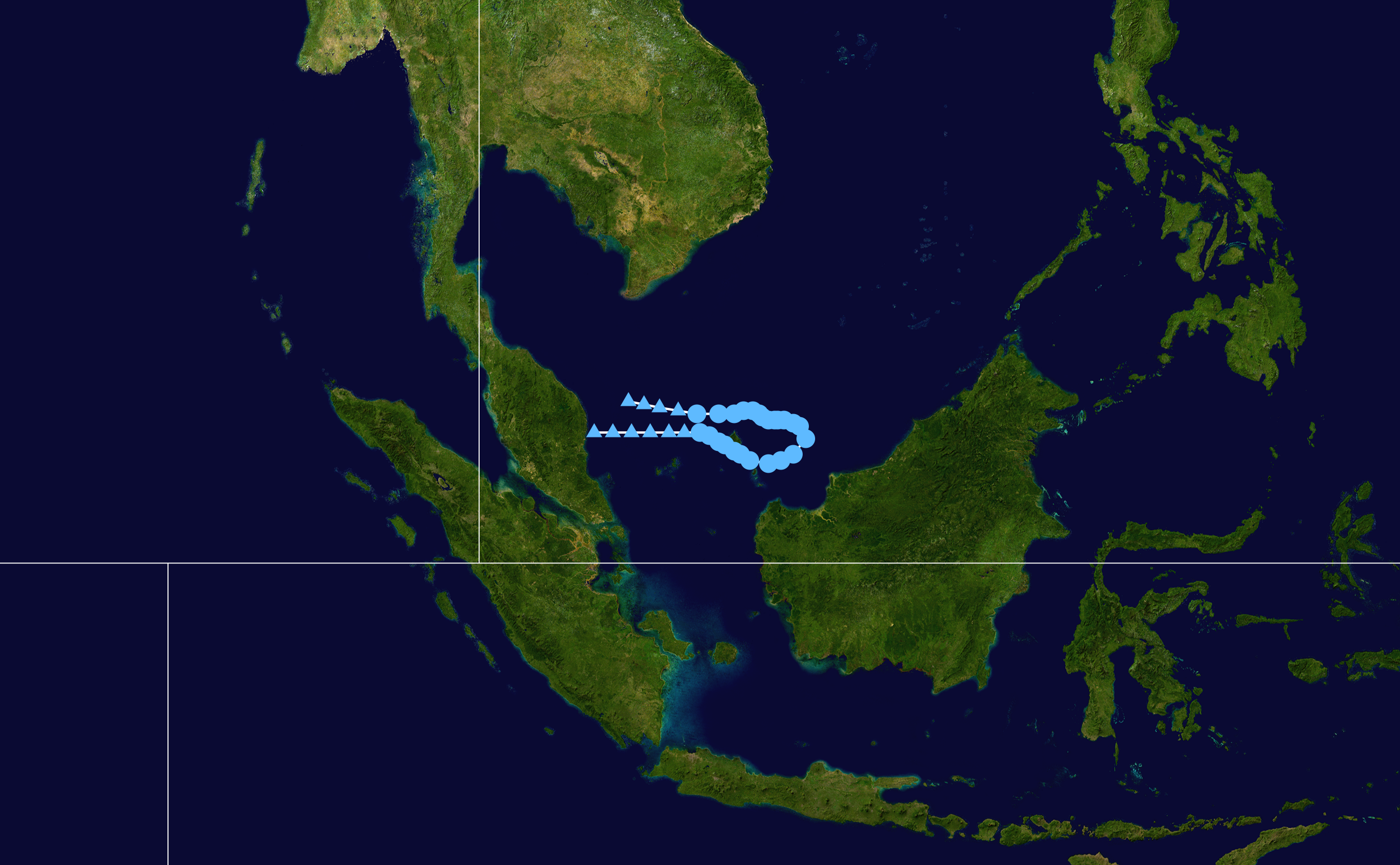
- Duration: December 14 – December 20
- Peak intensity: 55 km/h (35 mph) (1-min); 1000 hPa (mbar)

Tropical Depression 41W existed over the South China Sea from December 14 to December 20.

=== Severe Tropical Storm Fern ===
- Severe tropical storm (JMA)
- Category 1 typhoon (SSHWS)
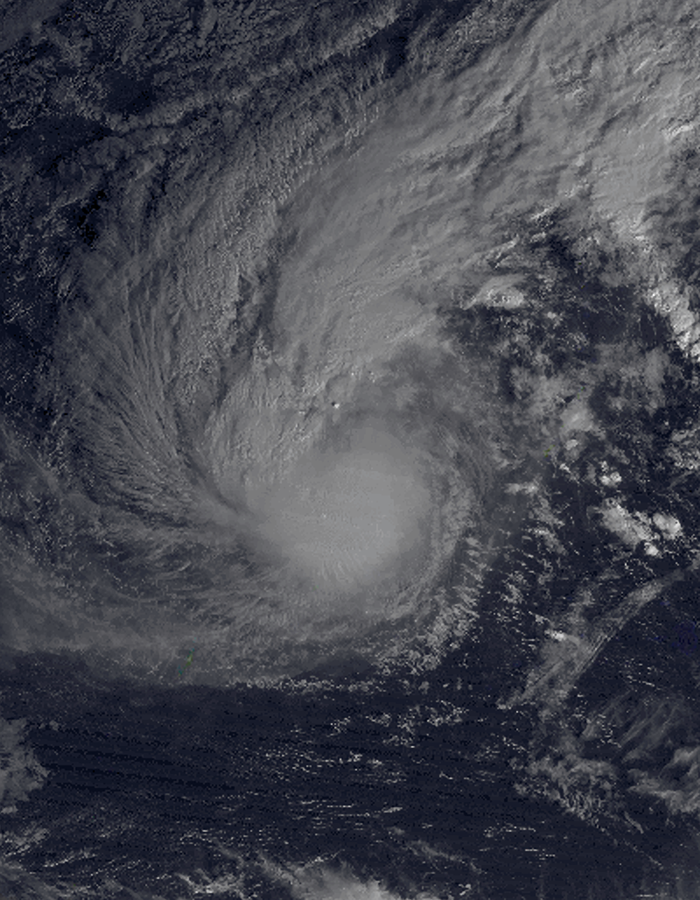
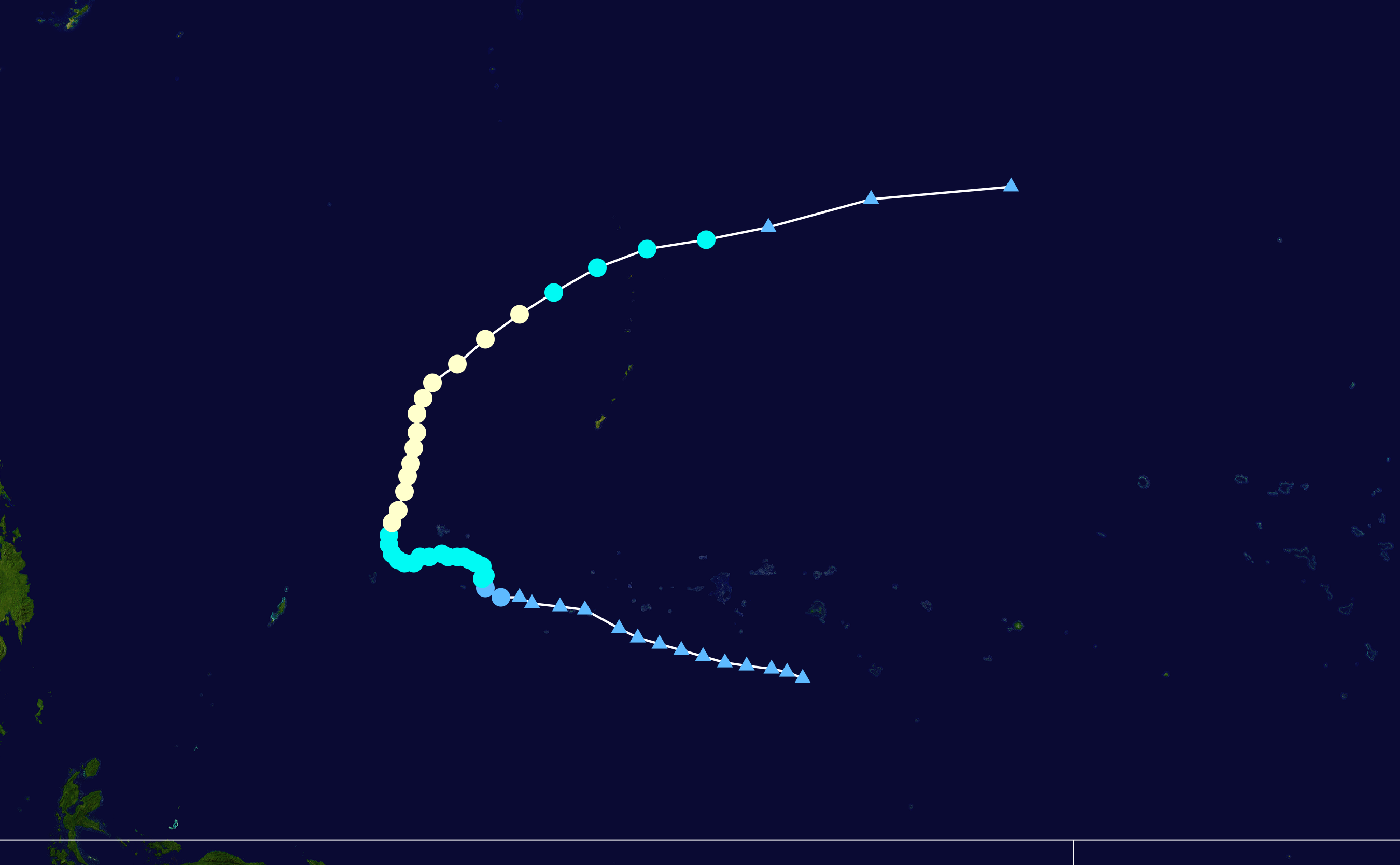
- Duration: December 21 – December 29
- Peak intensity: 110 km/h (70 mph) (10-min); 975 hPa (mbar)

A tropical depression formed on December 21, when a low-level circulation center began to produce deep convection. The depression strengthened into a tropical storm the next day, and was given the name Fern by the Joint Typhoon Warning Center (JTWC). The storm slowly intensified into a Category 1 typhoon on the Saffir–Simpson hurricane wind scale, according to JTWC. Fern peaked north of Yap on December 26, with JTWC assessing winds of 150 km/h (90 mph), while the Regional Specialized Meteorological Center, Japan Meteorological Agency (JMA) assessed peak winds of 110 km/h (70 mph), just below typhoon strength. The storm soon became sheared and weakened slowly. Fern continued to weaken to a tropical depression on December 30. Both agencies stopped advisories later on the same day.

=== Tropical Storm Greg ===
- Tropical storm (SSHWS)
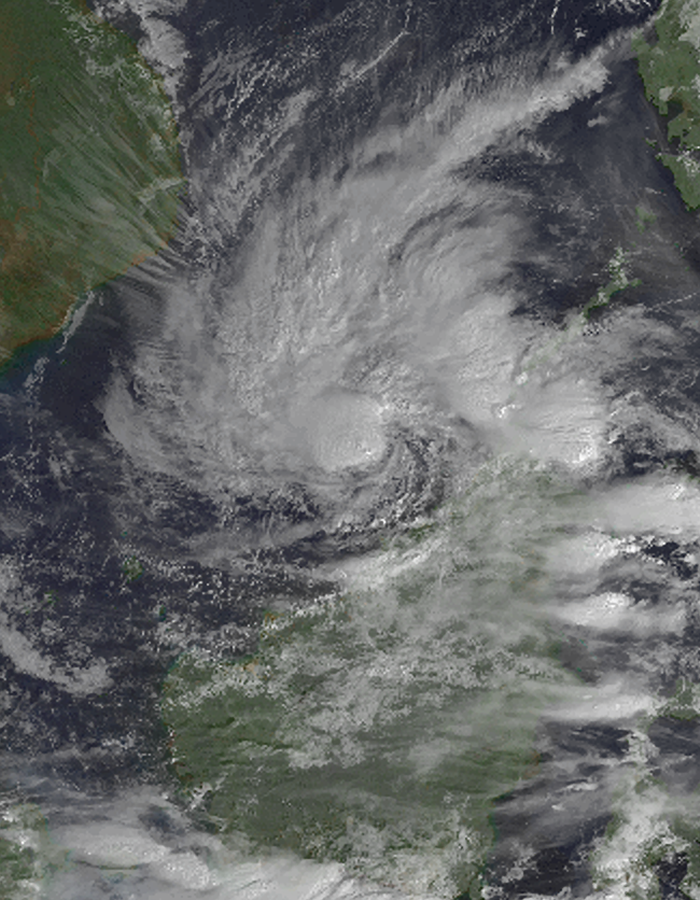
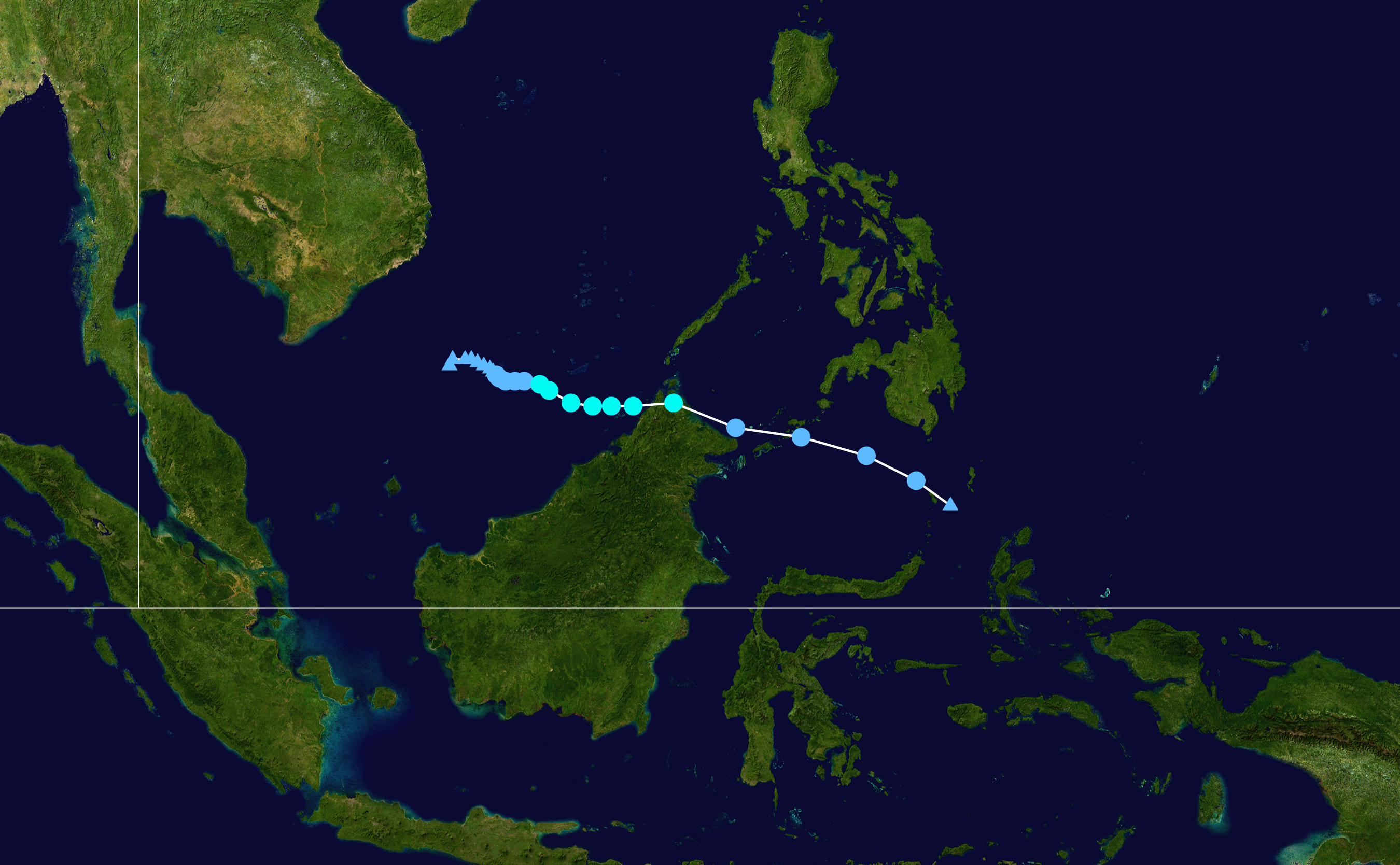
- Duration: December 24 – December 31
- Peak intensity: 90 km/h (55 mph) (1-min); 1002 hPa (mbar)

Two active monsoon troughs that also developed Typhoon Fern and Southern Hemisphere Cyclones Ophelia, Phil, and Fergus spawned Tropical Depression 43W in the South China Sea on December 21. Due to the troughs' nature, the depression headed east-southeastward, where it strengthened into the final tropical storm of the year on the 24th; Greg. After reaching a peak of 45 knots (83 km/h) winds it crossed the northern part of Borneo on the 25th. It continued east-southeastward until dissipation on the 27th, south of the Philippines. Greg caused extensive property damage on Borneo from torrential flooding, resulting in 127 deaths and 100 people missing.

== Storm names ==
During the season 30 named tropical cyclones developed in the Western Pacific and were named by the Joint Typhoon Warning Center, when it was determined that they had become tropical storms. These names were contributed to a revised list which started in 1996.

Ann	Bart	Cam	Dan	Eve	Frankie	Gloria	Herb	Ian	Joy	Kirk	Lisa	Marty	Niki	Orson
Piper	Rick	Sally	Tom	Violet	Willie	Yates	Zane	Abel	Beth	Carlo	Dale	Ernie	Fern	Greg

=== Philippines ===
Asiang	Biring	Konsing	Ditang	Edeng
Gloring	Huaning	Isang	Lusing	Maring
Ningning	Osang	Paring	Reming	Seniang
Toyang	Ulpiang	Welpring (unused)	Yerling (unused)	
Auxiliary list
				Apiang (unused)
Basiang (unused)	Kayang (unused)	Dorang (unused)	Enang (unused)	Grasing (unused)

The Philippine Atmospheric, Geophysical and Astronomical Services Administration uses its own naming scheme for tropical cyclones in their area of responsibility. PAGASA assigns names to tropical depressions that form within their area of responsibility and any tropical cyclone that might move into their area of responsibility. Should the list of names for a given year prove to be insufficient, names are taken from an auxiliary list, the first 10 of which are published each year before the season starts. Names not retired from this list will be used again in the 2000 season. This is the same list used for the 1992 season. PAGASA uses its own naming scheme that starts in the Filipino alphabet, with names of Filipino female names ending with "ng" (A, B, K, D, etc.). Names that were not assigned/going to use are marked in gray.

== Season effects ==
This table summarizes all the systems that developed within or moved into the North Pacific Ocean, to the west of the International Date Line during 1996. The tables also provide an overview of a systems intensity, duration, land areas affected and any deaths or damages associated with the system.

Name	Dates	Peak intensity			Areas affected	Damage (USD)	Deaths	Ref(s).
Name	Dates	Category	Wind speed	Pressure	Areas affected	Damage (USD)	Deaths	Ref(s).
TD	January 12-13	Tropical depression	Not specified	1008 hPa (29.77 inHg)	Philippines	None	None	
01W (Asiang)	February 28 – March 1	Tropical storm	65 km/h (40 mph)	998 hPa (29.47 inHg)	Philippines	None	None	
Ann (Biring)	April 1 – 10	Tropical storm	65 km/h (40 mph)	1000 hPa (29.53 inHg)	Caroline Islands, Philippines	None	None	
03W	April 25 – 26	Tropical depression	45 km/h (30 mph)	1004 hPa (29.65 inHg)	None	None	None	
Bart (Konsing)	May 8 – 18	Very strong typhoon	175 km/h (110 mph)	930 hPa (27.46 inHg)	Philippines	None	None	
Cam (Ditang)	May 18 – 24	Tropical storm	75 km/h (45 mph)	994 hPa (29.35 inHg)	Philippines, Taiwan	None	None	
TD	June 13 – 15	Tropical depression	Not specified	1004 hPa (29.65 inHg)	South China	None	None	
Dan	July 5 – 12	Typhoon	120 km/h (75 mph)	970 hPa (28.64 inHg)	Japan	None	None	
Eve	July 13 – 24	Typhoon	155 km/h (100 mph)	940 hPa (27.76 inHg)	Japan	$724 million	None	
Frankie (Edeng)	July 20 – 25	Severe tropical storm	95 km/h (60 mph)	975 hPa (28.79 inHg)	South China, Vietnam	$140 million	67	
Gloria (Gloring)	July 21 – 18	Typhoon	120 km/h (75 mph)	965 hPa (28.50 inHg)	Philippines, Taiwan, China	$54 million	75	
Herb (Huaning)	July 23 – August 4	Very strong typhoon	175 km/h (110 mph)	925 hPa (27.32 inHg)	Mariana Islands, Taiwan, Ryukyu Islands, China	$5 billion	830	
Ian	July 28 – 29	Tropical depression	75 km/h (45 mph)	1002 hPa (29.59 inHg)	Mariana Islands	None	None	
Joy	July 29 – August 6	Severe tropical storm	100 km/h (65 mph)	980 hPa (28.94 inHg)	None	None	None	
TD	July 31	Tropical depression	Not specified	1004 hPa (29.65 inHg)	Caroline Islands	None	None	
TD	August 2 – 3	Tropical depression	Not specified	998 hPa (29.47 inHg)	South China	None	None	
Kirk (Isang)	August 3 – 15	Typhoon	140 km/h (85 mph)	955 hPa (28.20 inHg)	Japan	$189 million	2	
Lisa	August 5 – 9	Tropical depression	55 km/h (35 mph)	996 hPa (29.41 inHg)	South China	Unknown	≥90	
TD	August 7	Tropical depression	Not specified	1002 hPa (29.59 inHg)	None	None	None	
15W	August 12 – 16	Tropical depression	55 km/h (35 mph)	998 hPa (29.47 inHg)	None	None	None	
TD	August 12	Tropical depression	Not specified	1002 hPa (29.59 inHg)	South China	None	None	
Marty	August 12 – 16	Tropical storm	95 km/h (60 mph)	998 hPa (29.47 inHg)	South China, Vietnam	$198 million	125	
17W	August 14 – 16	Tropical depression	55 km/h (35 mph)	1008 hPa (29.77 inHg)	None	None	None	
Niki (Lusing)	August 17 – 23	Typhoon	140 km/h (85 mph)	955 hPa (28.20 inHg)	Philippines, Vietnam, South China	$65 million	60	
TD	August 17	Tropical depression	Not specified	1008 hPa (29.77 inHg)	None	None	None	
Orson	August 20 – September 3	Typhoon	140 km/h (85 mph)	955 hPa (28.20 inHg)	Mariana Islands	None	None	
TD	August 21 – 22	Tropical depression	Not specified	1008 hPa (29.77 inHg)	None	None	None	
Piper	August 22 – 26	Tropical storm	75 km/h (45 mph)	996 hPa (29.41 inHg)	None	None	None	
TD	August 25 – 26	Tropical depression	Not specified	1008 hPa (29.77 inHg)	None	None	None	
21W	August 26 – 27	Tropical depression	45 km/h (30 mph)	1008 hPa (29.77 inHg)	None	None	None	
Rick	August 28 – September 1	Tropical depression	65 km/h (40 mph)	1004 hPa (29.65 inHg)	None	None	None	
Sally (Maring)	September 4 – 10	Typhoon	155 km/h (100 mph)	935 hPa (27.76 inHg)	Philippines, South China	$1.5 billion	140	
24W (Ningning)	September 10 – 14	Tropical depression	85 km/h (50 mph)	996 hPa (29.41 inHg)	Philippines, Vietnam	None	None	
Violet (Osang)	September 11 – 23	Very strong typhoon	165 km/h (105 mph)	935 hPa (27.32 inHg)	Japan	$154 million	7	
Tom	September 12 – 20	Typhoon	130 km/h (80 mph)	965 hPa (28.50 inHg)	Mariana Islands	None	None	
Willie	September 15 – 23	Severe tropical storm	100 km/h (65 mph)	985 hPa (29.09 inHg)	South China, Vietnam, Cambodia, Laos	$40 million	190	
Yates	September 21 – October 1	Very strong typhoon	165 km/h (105 mph)	935 hPa (27.32 inHg)	Mariana Islands	None	None	
Zane (Paring)	September 23 – October 3	Typhoon	150 km/h (90 mph)	950 hPa (28.05 inHg)	Marshall Islands, Mariana Islands	$10.5 million	None	
Abel (Reming)	October 10 – 17	Tropical depression	95 km/h (60 mph)	1002 hPa (29.59 inHg)	Philippines, Vietnam	$4.3 million	8	
Beth (Seniang)	October 11 – 22	Severe tropical storm	110 km/h (70 mph)	975 hPa (28.79 inHg)	Philippines, Vietnam	Unknown	3	
31W	October 15 – 16	Tropical depression	55 km/h (35 mph)	1006 hPa (29.41 inHg)	Mariana Islands	None	None	
Carlo	October 20 – 26	Typhoon	130 km/h (80 mph)	965 hPa (28.50 inHg)	Mariana Islands	None	None	
34W	October 24 – 25	Tropical depression	55 km/h (35 mph)	1006 hPa (29.41 inHg)	Mariana Islands	None	None	
35W	November 1 – 3	Tropical depression	75 km/h (45 mph)	998 hPa (29.47 inHg)	Vietnam	$138 million	79	
Dale (Ulpiang)	November 3 – 13	Typhoon	135 km/h (105 mph)	930 hPa (27.46 inHg)	Caroline Islands, Mariana Islands, Palau, Japan	$3.5 million	None	
Ernie (Toyang)	November 4 – 16	Tropical storm	75 km/h (45 mph)	996 hPa (29.41 inHg)	Philippines	$5.1 million	24	
38W	November 5 – 8	Tropical depression	95 km/h (60 mph)	1000 hPa (29.53 inHg)	Wake Island	None	None	
39W	November 7 – 8	Tropical depression	55 km/h (35 mph)	1006 hPa (29.41 inHg)	Mariana Islands	None	None	
40W	November 24 – 26	Tropical depression	45 km/h (30 mph)	1002 hPa (29.59 inHg)	Mariana Islands	None	None	
41W	December 14 – 20	Tropical depression	55 km/h (35 mph)	1000 hPa (29.53 inHg)	None	None	None	
Fern	December 21 – 29	Severe tropical storm	110 km/h (70 mph)	975 hPa (28.79 inHg)	Caroline Islands, Mariana Islands	$3 million	None	
Greg	December 24 – 31	Tropical storm	85 km/h (50 mph)	1002 hPa (29.59 inHg)	Malaysia, Philippines, Borneo	$280 million	297	
Season aggregates
52 systems	January 12 – December 29, 1996		175 km/h (110 mph)	925 hPa (27.32 inHg)		$8.5 billion	1,867	

== See also ==
- Tropical cyclones in 1996
- Pacific typhoon season
- 1996 Pacific hurricane season
- 1996 Atlantic hurricane season
- 1996 North Indian Ocean cyclone season
- South-West Indian Ocean cyclone seasons: 1995–96, 1996–97
- Australian region cyclone seasons: 1995–96, 1996–97
- South Pacific cyclone seasons: 1995–96, 1996–97
