= 1996–97 Southern Hemisphere tropical cyclone season =

The 1996-97 Southern Hemisphere tropical cyclone season ran year-round from 1 July 1996 to 30 June 1997. It was made up of three different basins and seasons; the

- 1996–97 South-West Indian Ocean cyclone season west of 90°E
- 1996–97 Australian region cyclone season between 90°E and 160°E
- 1996–97 South Pacific cyclone season east of 160°E
