= List of storms named Fergus =

The name Fergus has been used for one tropical cyclone and one extratropical cyclone worldwide.

In the Australian region:

- Cyclone Fergus (1996) – a Category 2 tropical cyclone that affected New Zealand and other islands in the Pacific Ocean

In Europe:

- Storm Fergus (2023) – a storm named by the Met Éireann, affected Ireland and United Kingdom
