= Cyclone Drena =

South Pacific and Australian region cyclone in 1997

Severe Tropical Cyclone Drena
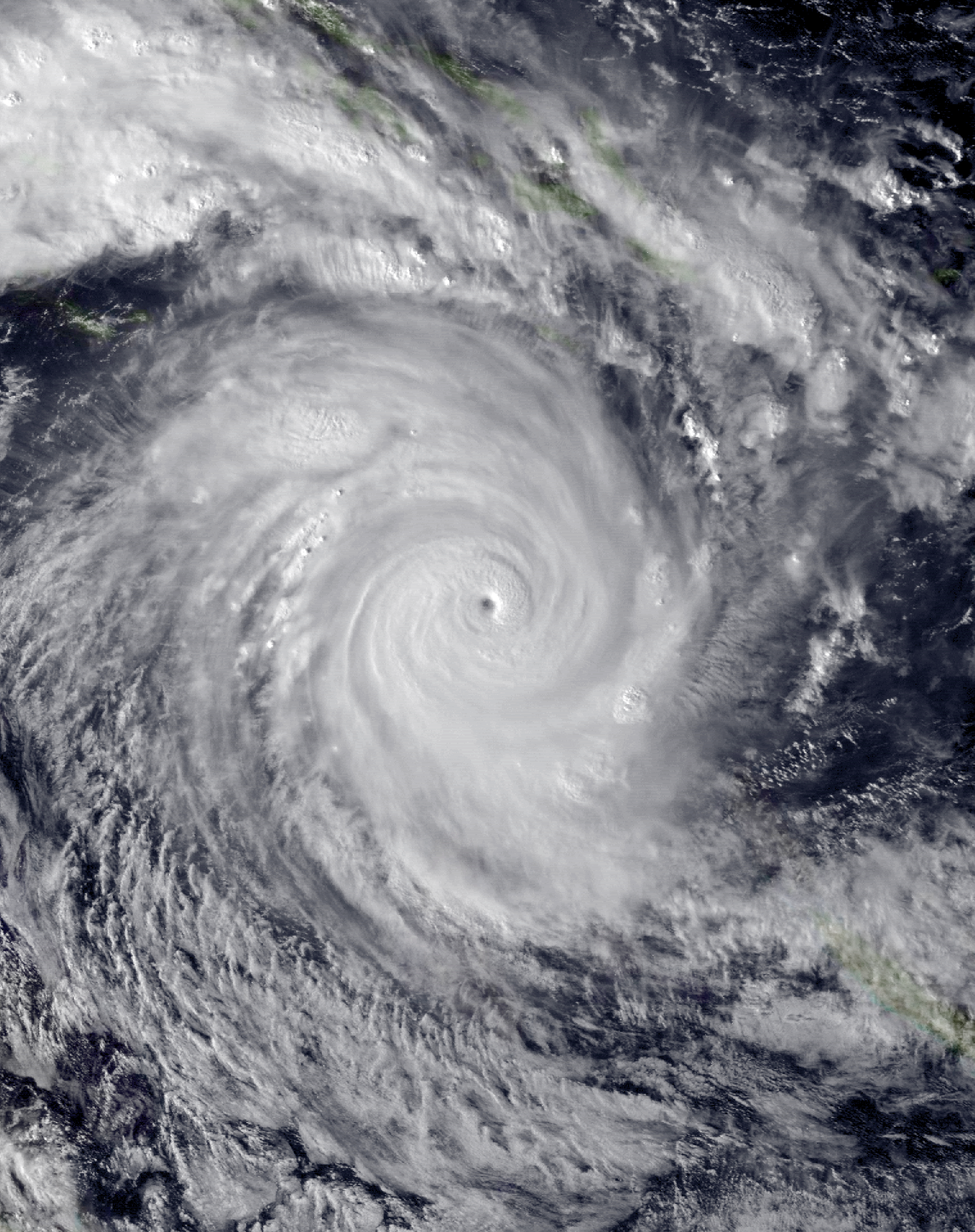
- Drena near peak intensity on 5 January

Meteorological history
- Formed: 2 January 1997
- Extratropical: 9 January 1997
- Dissipated: 13 January 1997

Category 4 severe tropical cyclone
- 10-minute sustained (FMS)
- Highest winds: 165 km/h (105 mph)
- Lowest pressure: 935 hPa (mbar); 27.61 inHg

Category 4-equivalent tropical cyclone
- 1-minute sustained (SSHWS/JTWC)
- Highest winds: 220 km/h (140 mph)
- Lowest pressure: 922 hPa (mbar); 27.23 inHg

Overall effects
- Fatalities: 3 total
- Damage: $6.7 million (1997 USD)
- Areas affected: Solomon Islands, Vanuatu, New Caledonia, Norfolk Island and New Zealand
- IBTrACS
- Part of the 1996–97 South Pacific and Australian region cyclone seasons

Severe Tropical Cyclone Drena was a powerful tropical cyclone that caused significant damage throughout New Zealand. A tropical depression formed on 2 January 1997. After crossing Vanuatu and emerging into the Coral Sea, the storm began to intensify, and by 6 January, had attained peak intensity. After attaining peak intensity, Drena began to weaken. Cyclone Drena later brushed New Caledonia, bringing some damage. After transitioning into an extratropical cyclone on 9 January, Drena brought impact to New Zealand. The damage totaled $6.7 million, and 3 people were killed. Roughly 140 people were evacuated after 44 homes were flooded. After the season, the name Drena was retired.

== Meteorological history ==
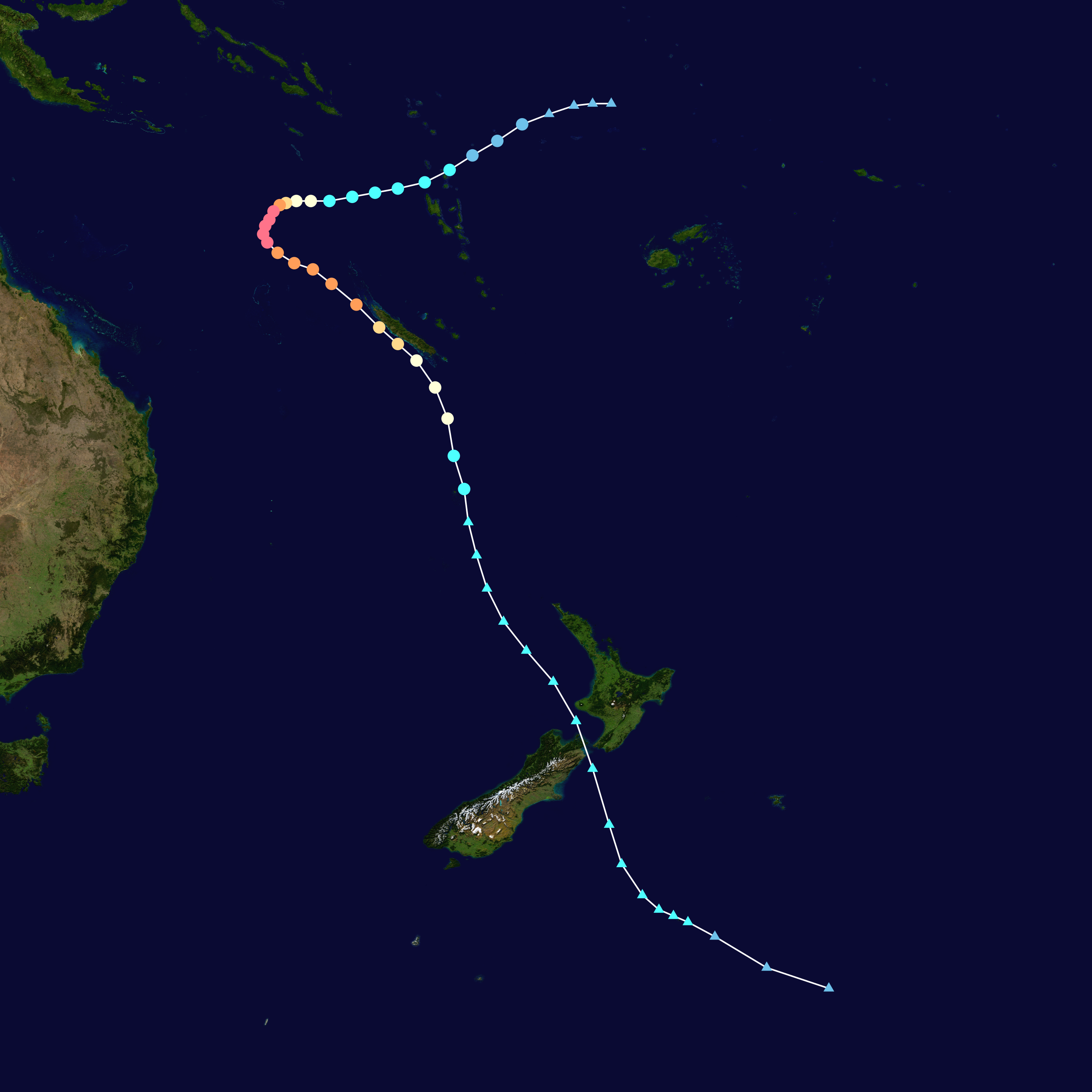
Map plotting the storm's track and intensity, according to the Saffir–Simpson scale Map key Saffir–Simpson scale Tropical depression (≤38 mph, ≤62 km/h) Tropical storm (39–73 mph, 63–118 km/h) Category 1 (74–95 mph, 119–153 km/h) Category 2 (96–110 mph, 154–177 km/h) Category 3 (111–129 mph, 178–208 km/h) Category 4 (130–156 mph, 209–251 km/h) Category 5 (≥157 mph, ≥252 km/h) Unknown Storm type Tropical cyclone Subtropical cyclone Extratropical cyclone, remnant low, tropical disturbance, or monsoon depression

During the opening days of 1997, the precursor tropical low to Severe Tropical Cyclone Drena, developed within a monsoon trough of low pressure to the north of Fiji. Over the next couple of days, the system moved west-southwestwards along a subtropical ridge of high pressure and gradually developed further, with a low-level inflow and an upper divergent easterly flow aiding the systems development. The storm subsequently impacted northern Vanuatu during 3 January, while the United States Joint Typhoon Warning Center (JTWC) initiated advisories on the system and designated it as Tropical Cyclone 16P. Later that day, after the storm had moved into the Coral Sea the system started to rapidly intensify, as vertical wind shear decreased. In response, the Fiji Meteorological Service reported that the system had become a Category 1 tropical cyclone, on the Australian tropical cyclone intensity scale and named it Drena. (Note: Severe Tropical Cyclone Drena was officially monitored by three warning centres during its lifetime. These were the Fiji Meteorological Service, MetService and the Australian Bureau of Meteorology.)

After being named, Drena continued to move westwards and rapidly develop, with an eye becoming clearly defined on satellite imagery. As a result of the rapid development, the system became a Category 3 severe tropical cyclone during 4 January, as it moved out of the South Pacific basin and into the Australian region. At around this time the system started to interact with a deep short wave trough of low pressure, which ultimately caused the system to recurve and move south-eastwards and pass through a weakness in the subtropical ridge of high pressure. The JTWC subsequently estimated during the next day that Drena had peaked with 1-minute sustained wind speeds of 220 km/h (140 mph), which made it equivalent to a Category 4 hurricane on the Saffir-Simpson hurricane wind scale. During 5 January, the Australian Bureau of Meteorology reported that the system had peaked as a Category 4 severe tropical cyclone, with 10-minute sustained wind speeds estimated at 165 km/h (105 mph) and a central pressure of 935 hPa (27.61 inHg).

Continuing to move south-eastwards, the storm moved back into the South Pacific basin during 6 January, where it started to weaken as wind shear ahead of the trough of low pressure increased. The system subsequently brushed the west coast of New Caledonia, as a Category 3 severe tropical cyclone between 7 and 8 January. As the system brushed New Caledonia, a trough of low pressure moved into the Tasman Sea, which caused north-northwesterly winds over the system to strengthen and shear the storm's upper level cloud mass towards the southeast. These north-northwesterly winds also caused the system to accelerate southeastwards, towards the cooler waters surrounding Norfolk Island. Drena started to transition into an extra-tropical cyclone by 06:00 on 8 January, before it started to significantly weaken during that day with the systems structure becoming asymmetrical. The system subsequently passed over Norfolk Island as a Category 2 tropical cyclone at around 06:15 UTC on 9 January, before it was declared to be an extratropical cyclone by New Zealand's MetService later that day. However, the JTWC continued issuing warnings on Drena as a tropical cyclone, until late on 10 January when they declared it to be an extratropical cyclone. The system subsequently crossed New Zealand's North Island near Wanganui, before its centre reformed off the coast of Hawke's Bay during 11 January. It then became unclear where Drena's remnants went, but a low was observed to the east of Canterbury which moved away from the South Island slowly during 12 January. The systems remnants were then last noted by MetService during 13 January, while they were located around 1,500 km (930 mi) to the southeast of Wellington, New Zealand.

Do to the damage caused in New Zealand and other islands in the South Pacific, the name Drena was retired and replaced with Daphne for future seasons.

== Preparations and impact ==
While it was active Drena impacted the Solomon Islands, Vanuatu, New Caledonia, Norfolk Island and New Zealand, some of which had been affected by a few days earlier. As a result of the impact caused by the system the name Drena was retired after the season had ended, by the World Meteorological Organization's RA V Tropical Cyclone Committee.

Between 3 and 6 January, Vanuatu and the Solomon Islands, became the first two island nations to be impacted by Drena, less than two weeks after Severe Tropical Cyclone Fergus had affected the islands. Strong winds, heavy rain and high seas impacted both island nations, with extensive damage reported on the coral limestone atoll of Rennell Island. The system was subsequently expected to impact the coast of Queensland later that week, before it recurved and impacted New Caledonia between 8 and 8 January.

Ahead of Drena impacting New Caledonia, the French territory was placed on maximum alert, with residents told to stay indoors during the cyclone. The system subsequently moved down and impacted most of New Caledonia's West Coast between 7 and 8 January, but spared the capital: Nouméa any major damage. Heavy rains accompanied the storm, peaking at 474 mm (18.7 in) in Dzumac. La Foa also recorded 202 mm (8.0 in) of rain. Wind gusts reached 165 km/h (105 mph) in Koumac. Almost all crops were destroyed and many roads were flooded. High winds knocked out power and communication to most of the island.

After Drena had impacted New Caledonia it moved south-eastwards and passed over Norfolk Island, while transitioning into an extra-tropical cyclone.

=== New Zealand ===
Between 10 and 12 January, Drena became the second system to impact New Zealand, about two weeks after the remnants of Severe Tropical Cyclone Fergus had severely affected the country . Ahead of the system impacting New Zealand, MetService warned that heavy rain and severe gales were expected in several northern districts, while issuing various warnings for the island nation.

Severe Tropical Cyclone Drena was responsible for damaged roads, property, and agriculture to New Zealand. Overall, damage totaled to $6.7 million (1996 USD). Insurance payouts totaled to $3.2 million. Meanwhile, damage to roads totaled to $2 million and over $1.5 million was down to property. A total of 3 deaths were reported. One man was electrocuted during the storm when he grabbed a fallen powerline when he was climbing up a bank. In addition, An elderly couple died when their car slid sideways into another car on a road. High waves from Cyclone Drena crashed against sea walls along the northern coast of New Zealand.

Roughly 140 people were evacuated at Moanatairi while residents from 20 homes were evacuated at Moanatairi, Te Puru, and Waiomu. A total of 44 homes were flooded and subsequently damaged; 33 of which had soaked carpets and ruined walls and furniture. Considerable damage was recorded on North Island, trees and powerlines were downed and house roofs were lifted. Severe damage was reported in a Northland camp ground. One road was closed for 30 hours. In Auckland, widespread damage and flooding was reported. Offshore, ferries were cancelled. In Maramarua, around 30 customers were without power for several hours. Several trams were flooded in Waikawau. Several rives were flooded in the Southland. Throughout the island, widespread rains and flooding was reported. In addition. Hauraki Gulf measured winds of up to 160 km/h (99 mph). In Thames, 3.6 m (12 ft) swells were measured. Christchurch received 47 mm (1.9 in) of rain.

== See also ==
- Cyclone Bola (1988)
- Cyclone Wilma (2011)
