= Cyclone Fergus =

Tropical cyclone in the South Pacific

Severe Tropical Cyclone Fergus
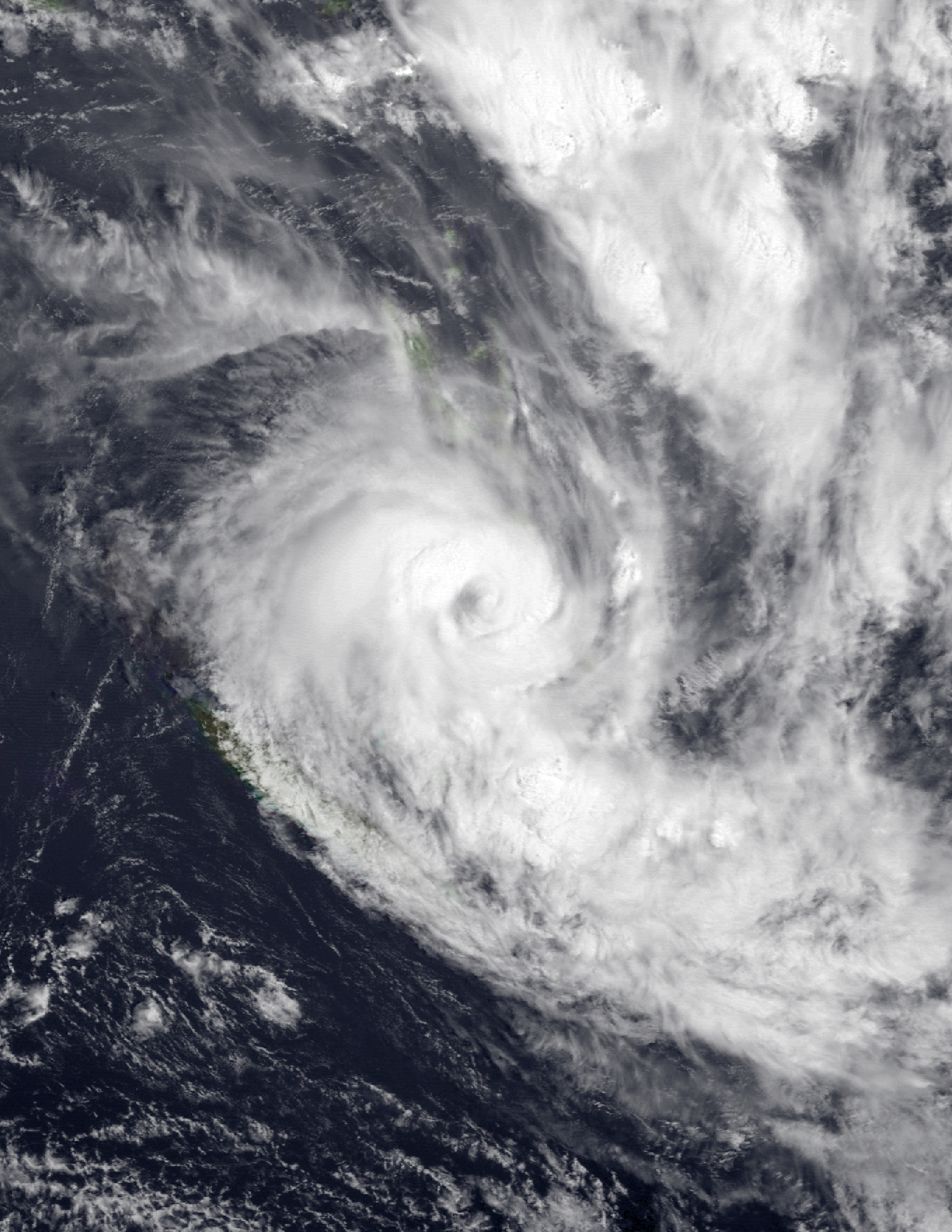
- Cyclone Fergus near peak intensity on 27 December

Meteorological history
- Formed: 23 December 1996
- Extratropical: 29 December 1996
- Dissipated: 1 January 1997

Category 3 severe tropical cyclone
- 10-minute sustained (FMS)
- Highest winds: 150 km/h (90 mph)
- Lowest pressure: 955 hPa (mbar); 28.20 inHg

Category 2-equivalent tropical cyclone
- 1-minute sustained (SSHWS/JTWC)
- Highest winds: 165 km/h (105 mph)
- Lowest pressure: 954 hPa (mbar); 28.17 inHg

Overall effects
- Damage: $2 million (1997 USD)
- Areas affected: Solomon Islands, Vanuatu, New Caledonia and New Zealand
- IBTrACS
- Part of the 1996–97 South Pacific and Australian region cyclone seasons

Severe Tropical Cyclone Fergus was a tropical cyclone that affected islands in the south-west Pacific Ocean. It lasted from 23 December 1996 to 1 January 1997, and reached speeds of up to 165 kilometers per hour, or 90 miles per hour. In addition to its winds, the storm caused heavy rains and severe flooding, causing significant damage to property in some areas.

== Meteorological history ==
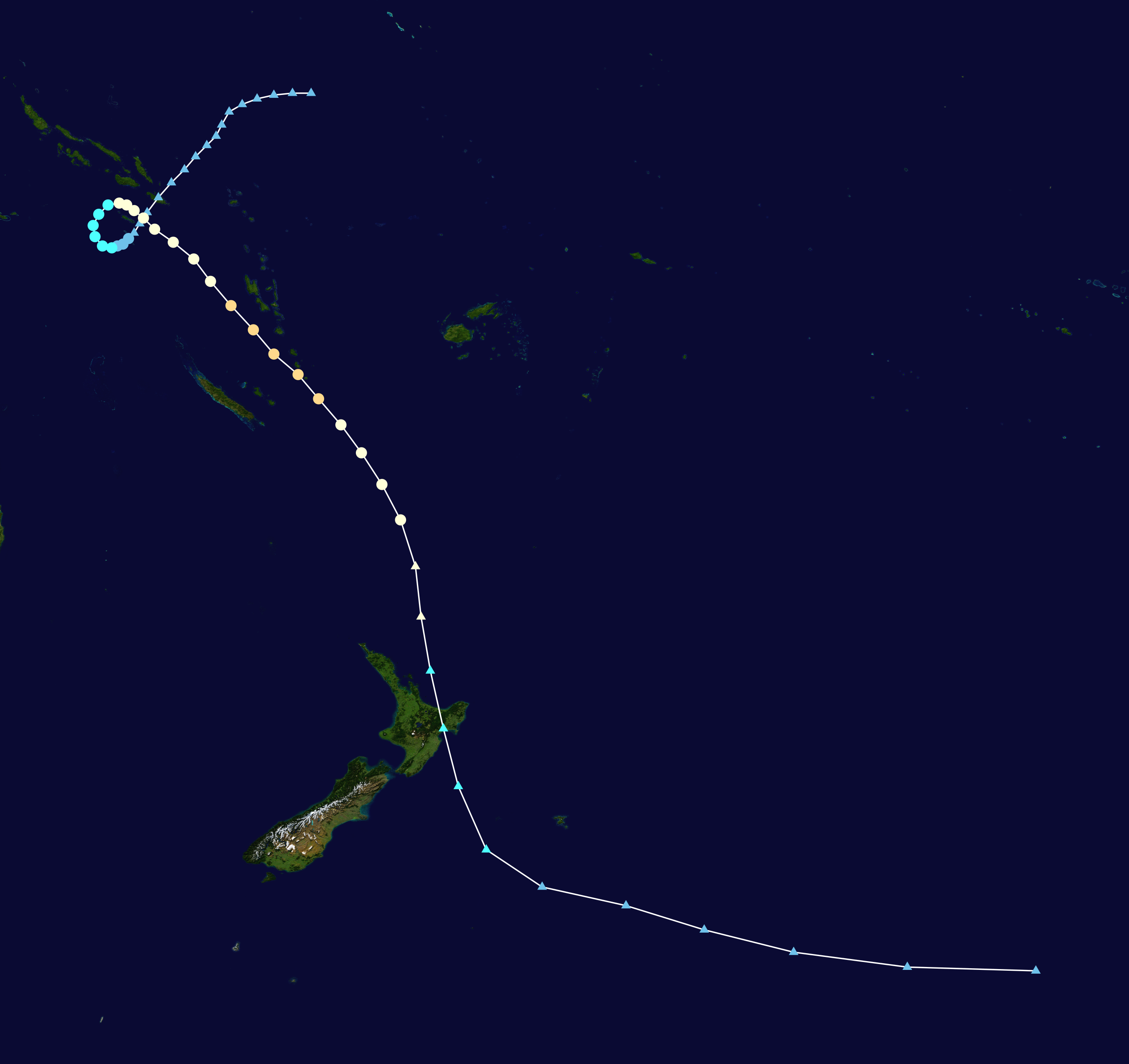
Map plotting the storm's track and intensity, according to the Saffir–Simpson scale Map key Saffir–Simpson scale Tropical depression (≤38 mph, ≤62 km/h) Tropical storm (39–73 mph, 63–118 km/h) Category 1 (74–95 mph, 119–153 km/h) Category 2 (96–110 mph, 154–177 km/h) Category 3 (111–129 mph, 178–208 km/h) Category 4 (130–156 mph, 209–251 km/h) Category 5 (≥157 mph, ≥252 km/h) Unknown Storm type Tropical cyclone Subtropical cyclone Extratropical cyclone, remnant low, tropical disturbance, or monsoon depression

The precursor tropical disturbance to Severe Tropical Cyclone Fergus was first noted by the United States Joint Typhoon Warning Center (JTWC) on 19 December 1996, while it was located about 750 km (465 mi) to the southeast of Bairiki in Kiribati. Over the next day the system moved south-westwards and became better organised, which prompted the JTWC to issue a tropical cyclone formation alert on the system during 20 December. However, this alert was cancelled during the next day as atmospheric convection, associated with the systems low level circulation center significantly decreased. The system subsequently passed over the southern Solomon Islands during the next day, before convection associated with the systems low level circulation center became better organised. As a result of this the system was classified as a tropical low by the Australian Bureau of Meteorology (BoM) during 23 December, while the JTWC issued another tropical cyclone formation alert on the low. During that day, the depression gradually deepened further before the BoM reported, that it had developed into a tropical cyclone and named it Fergus later that day. The JTWC subsequently initiated advisories on Fergus, early the next day and designated it as Tropical Cyclone 13P, while it was located near Rennell Island.

After being named, Fergus performed a cyclonic loop in an area of weak steering flow, before it started to move south-eastwards, under the influence of an approaching upper level trough of low pressure. As a result, it crossed 160°E and moved into the South Pacific basin during 26 December, shortly before becoming a Category 3 severe tropical cyclone on the Australian tropical cyclone intensity scale. The system subsequently continued to move south-eastwards towards a weakness in a subtropical ridge of high pressure, before it passed in between Vanuatu and New Caledonia's Loyalty Islands between 27 and 28 December. At around this time the Fiji Meteorological Service estimated that the system had peaked as a Category 3 severe tropical cyclone, with 10-minute sustained winds of 150 km/h (90 mph). The JTWC also estimated during 27 December, that the system had peaked with 1-minute sustained wind speeds of 165 km/h (105 mph).

== Preparations, impact and aftermath ==
Fergus and its precursor tropical disturbance brought strong winds and heavy rain to the Solomon Islands, which caused serious flooding on the islands of Guadalcanal, Rennell and Bellona. As a result, significant property damage and hundreds of food gardens were destroyed throughout the island nation. Two deaths were also reported, while several regions were declared disaster areas by the Government of the Solomon Islands. The National Disaster Council also launched an appeal for cash and rice, to help ease the food crisis in affected areas. As a result, Taiwan donated $355,000 and 140 kg (310 lb) of vegetable seeds for disaster relief, while Australia and New Zealand donated to the relief effort via the Solomon Islands Red Cross.

After impacting the Solomon Islands, Fergus moved south-eastwards where it moved in between and parallel to Vanuatu and New Caledonia's Loyalty Islands. As a result, New Caledonia's eastern Loyalty Islands were placed on high alert with people urged to reinforce doors and windows and limit their movements, while the rest of the French territory was placed on a precautionary alert. On Matthew Island, a significant drop in air pressure was recorded, as Fergus moved past, but no wind speeds were recorded at the weather station as the station's anemometer had been broken. Cyclonic winds and torrential rains were subsequently recorded within Vanuatu, with food gardens in Aneityum damaged as a result.

Ahead of the system impacting New Zealand, MetService issued warnings for gale-force winds and heavy rain in various districts of the North Island. They also warned that Fergus would bring with it around about thirty hours of rain and six to eight hours of damaging winds. As a result, all campers and hikers who were holidaying on the North Island's East Coast were told to pack up and leave the area. Ahead of Fergus impacting New Zealand, the ground was becoming saturated as a shallow trough of low pressure and moist northeast flow, had caused rain to set in from Northland to the Bay of Plenty. Fergus caused extensive damage in New Zealand after making landfall.

Play in the qualifying and first rounds of the 1997 ASB Classic tennis tournament to be significantly disrupted, due to torrential rain, poor light and strong wind caused by Fergus.
