= 1996–97 South Pacific cyclone season =

Tropical cyclone season

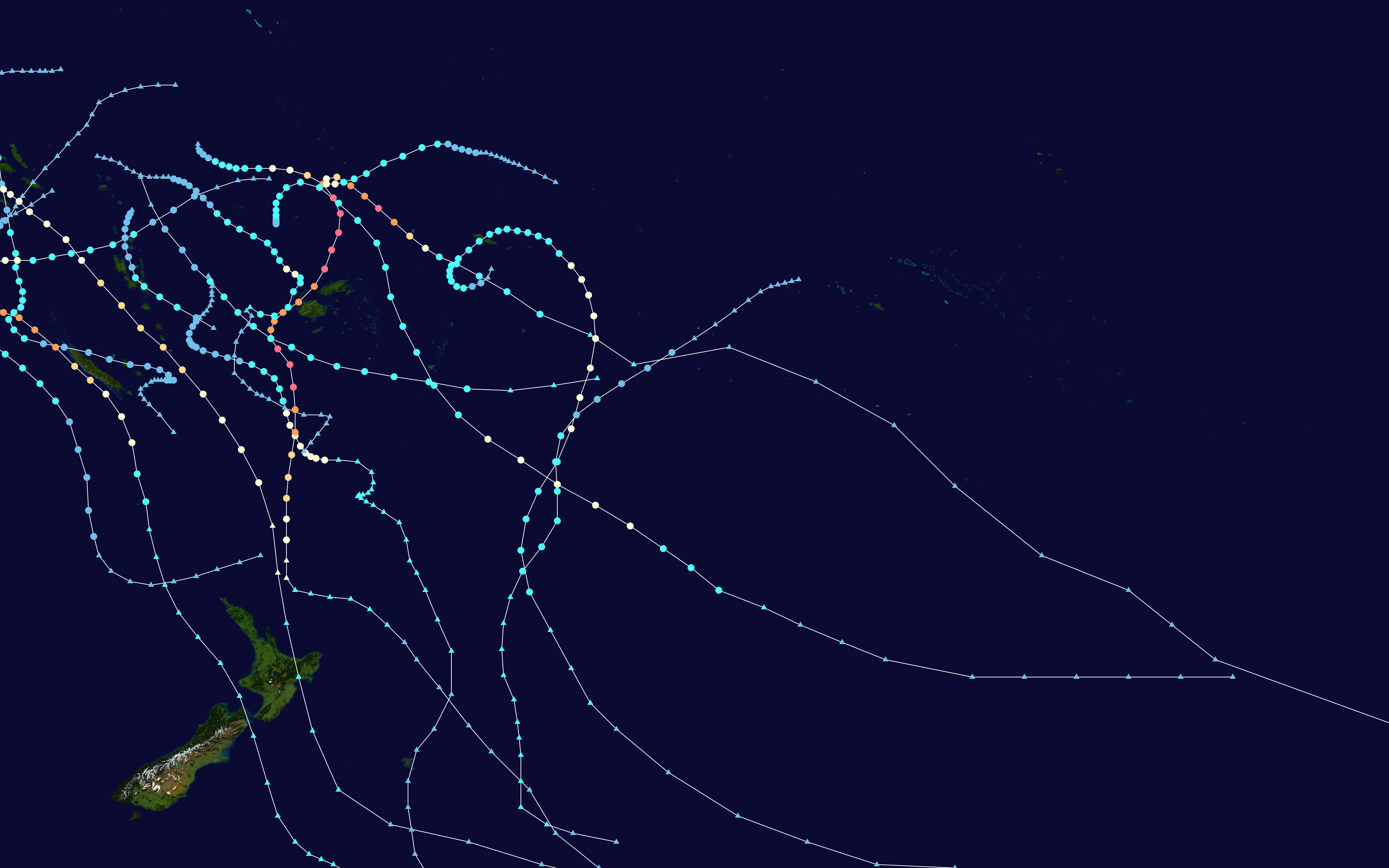
- Season summary map

Seasonal boundaries
- First system formed: November 19, 1996
- Last system dissipated: June 17, 1997

Strongest storm
- Name: Gavin
  - Maximum winds: 195 km/h (120 mph) (10-minute sustained)
  - Lowest pressure: 925 hPa (mbar)

Seasonal statistics
- Total depressions: 14, 1 unofficial
- Tropical cyclones: 12, 1 unofficial
- Severe tropical cyclones: 6
- Total fatalities: 26 total
- Total damage: $128 million (1997 USD)

Related articles
- 1996–97 Australian region cyclone season; 1996–97 South-West Indian Ocean cyclone season

The 1996–97 South Pacific cyclone season was one of the most active and longest South Pacific tropical cyclone seasons on record, with 12 tropical cyclones occurring within the South Pacific basin between 160°E and 120°W. The season officially ran from November 1, 1996 - April 30, 1997, however, the season ended later than normal with three systems monitored after the official end of the season. The strongest tropical cyclone of the season was Cyclone Gavin which had a minimum pressure of 925 hPa (27.32 inHg). After the season had ended 4 tropical cyclone names were retired from the naming lists, after the cyclones had caused significant impacts to South Pacific islands.

During the season, tropical cyclones were officially monitored by the Regional Specialized Meteorological Center (RSMC) in Nadi, Fiji and the Tropical Cyclone Warning Centers in Brisbane, Australia and Wellington, New Zealand. The United States Armed Forces through the Joint Typhoon Warning Center (JTWC) and Naval Pacific Meteorology and Oceanography Center (NPMOC), also monitored the basin and issued unofficial warnings for American interests. During the season RSMC Nadi issued warnings and assigned names to any tropical cyclones that developed between the Equator and 25°S while TCWC Wellington issued warnings for any that were located to the south of 25°S. The JTWC issued warnings for American interests on any significant tropical cyclone that was located between 160°E and the 180° while the NPMOC issued warnings for tropical cyclones forming between 180° and the American coast. RSMC Nadi and TCWC Wellington measure sustained windspeeds over a 10-minute and used the Australian tropical cyclone intensity scale, while the JTWC and the NPMOC measured sustained windspeeds over a 1-minute period which are compared to the Saffir-Simpson Hurricane Wind Scale (SSHWS).

== Season summary ==
Ahead of the cyclone season starting on November 1, 1996, the weak to moderate La Nina episode that had caused tropical cyclone activity, to be generally confined to the Coral Sea during the previous season persisted. However, during the season the La Nina episode started to break down, with signs emerging that the El Nino Episode of 1997-98 was starting to develop. These signs included tropical cyclones occurring to the east of 165°E and the South Pacific Convergence Zone becoming more active. The season officially featured a total of eleven tropical cyclones occurring in RSMC Nadi's area of responsibility to the north of 25S, while one developed in TCWC Wellington's area of responsibility and could not be named. An additional system was monitored by the United States Joint Typhoon Warning Center, which was an unofficial warning centre for the region, along with the Naval Pacific Meteorology and Oceanography Center during the season.

Significant tropical cyclones during the season included Fergus and Drena, which both impacted the island nations of Vanuatu, New Caledonia and New Zealand. Severe Tropical Cyclone Gavin was the strongest tropical cyclone and impacted the island nations of Tuvalu, Fiji, New Zealand, Wallis and Futuna. Severe Tropical Cyclone Hina subsequently became the worst tropical cyclone to affect the South Pacific island nation of Tonga since Cyclone Isaac in 1982. Three tropical cyclones developed after the season ended on April 30, including Severe Tropical Cyclone Keli which became the first recorded post-season tropical cyclone to form in June within the South Pacific Ocean. The names Drena, Fergus, Gavin, Hina and Keli were subsequently retired, by the World Meteorological Organization's RA V Tropical Cyclone Committee.

== Systems ==
=== Tropical Cyclone Cyril ===
- Category 1 tropical cyclone (Australian scale)
- Tropical storm (SSHWS)
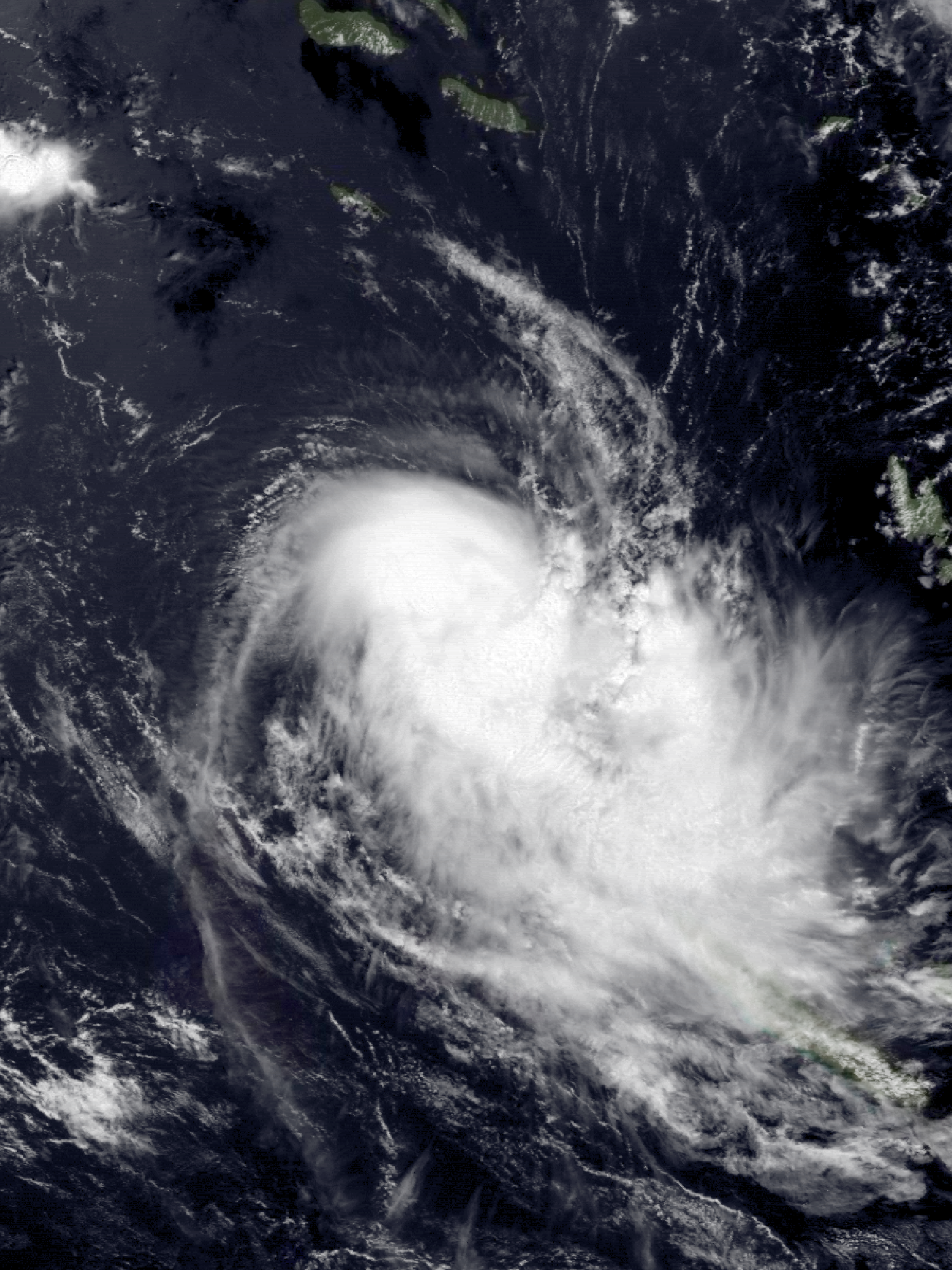
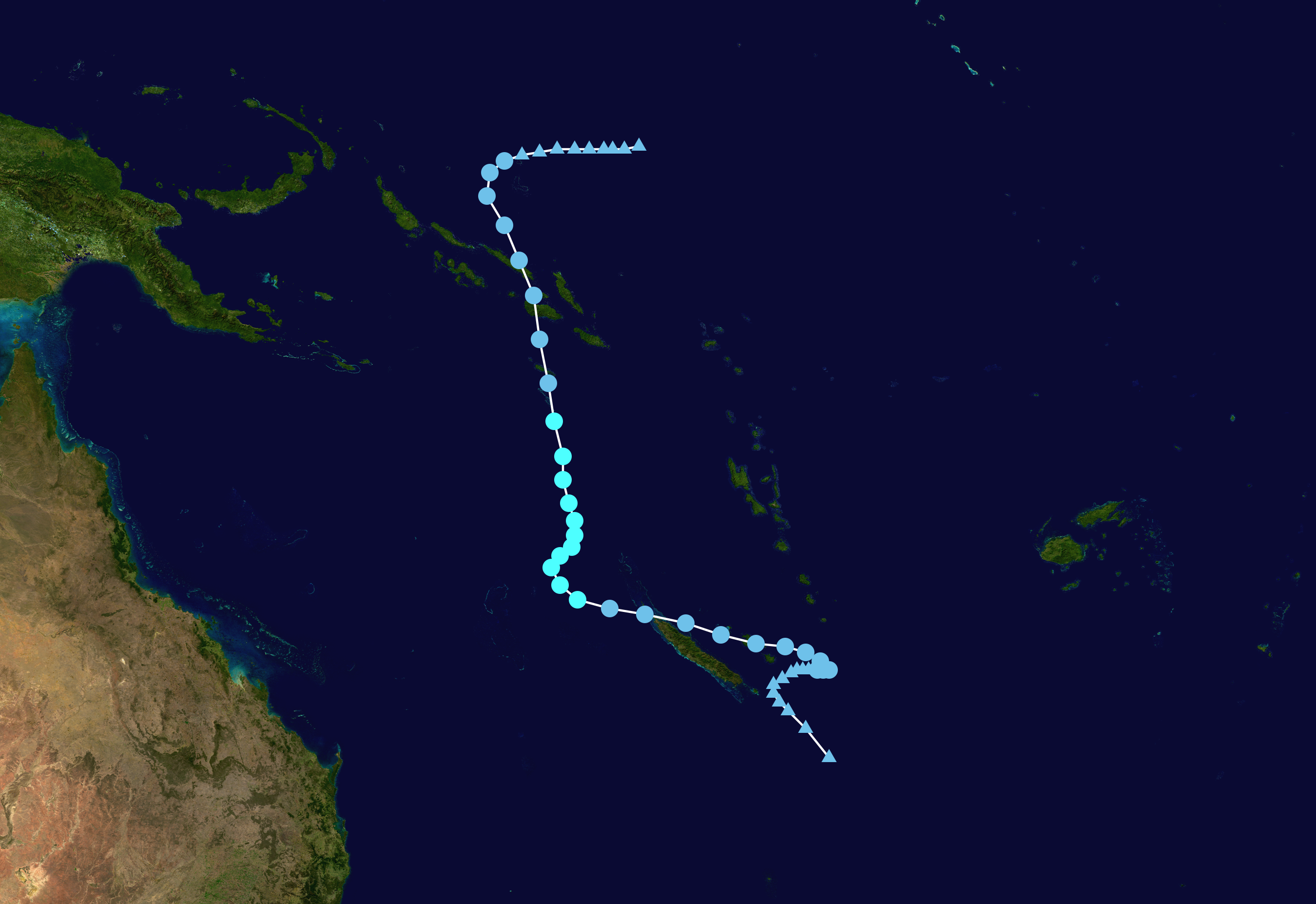
- Duration: November 22 – November 26
- Peak intensity: 85 km/h (50 mph) (10-min); 987 hPa (mbar)

On November 20, a complex area of low pressure formed within a convergence zone about 250 km (155 mi) to the northeast of Guadalcanal in the Solomon Islands.

The storm produced heavy rains and high winds over New Caledonia before dissipating.

=== Severe Tropical Cyclone Fergus ===
- Category 3 severe tropical cyclone (Australian scale)
- Category 2 tropical cyclone (SSHWS)
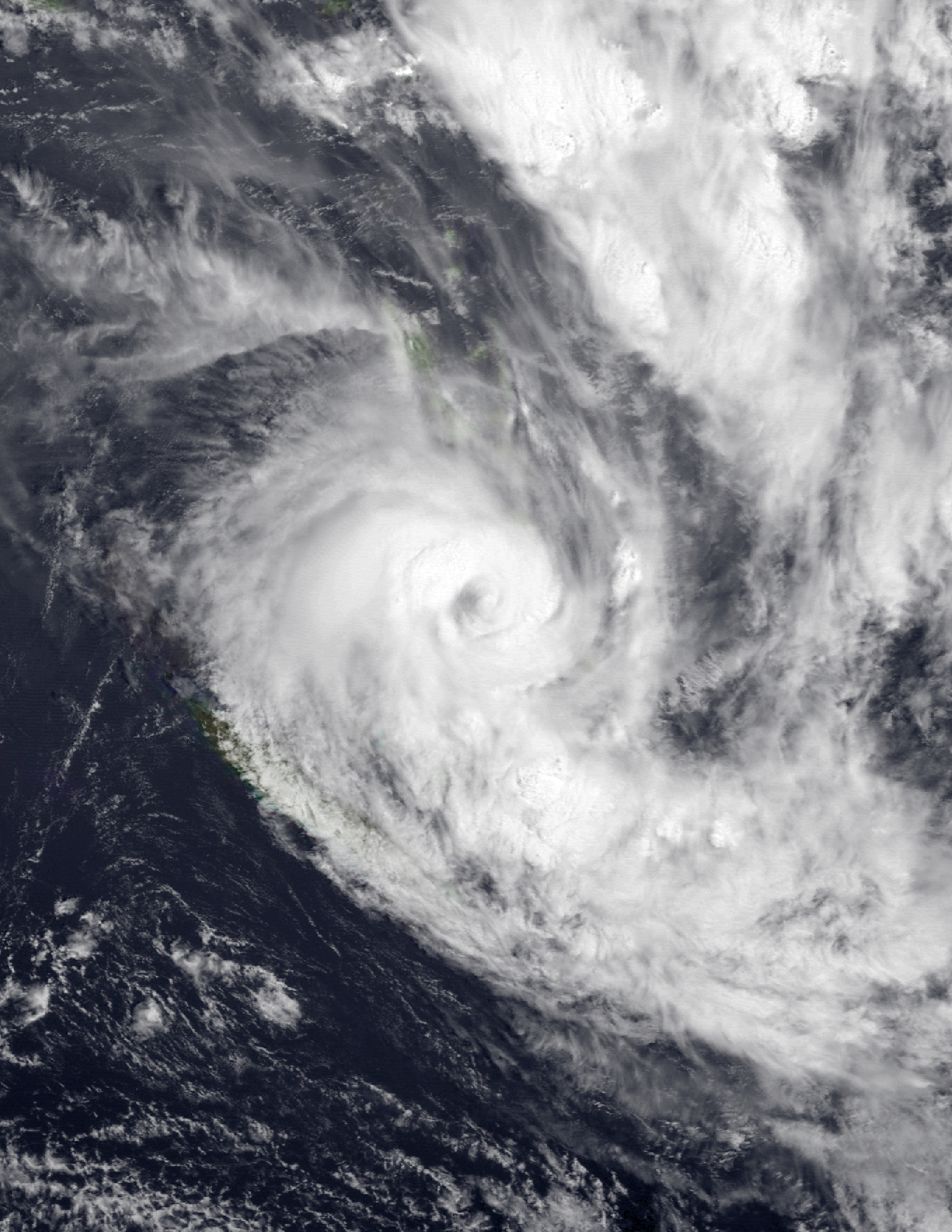
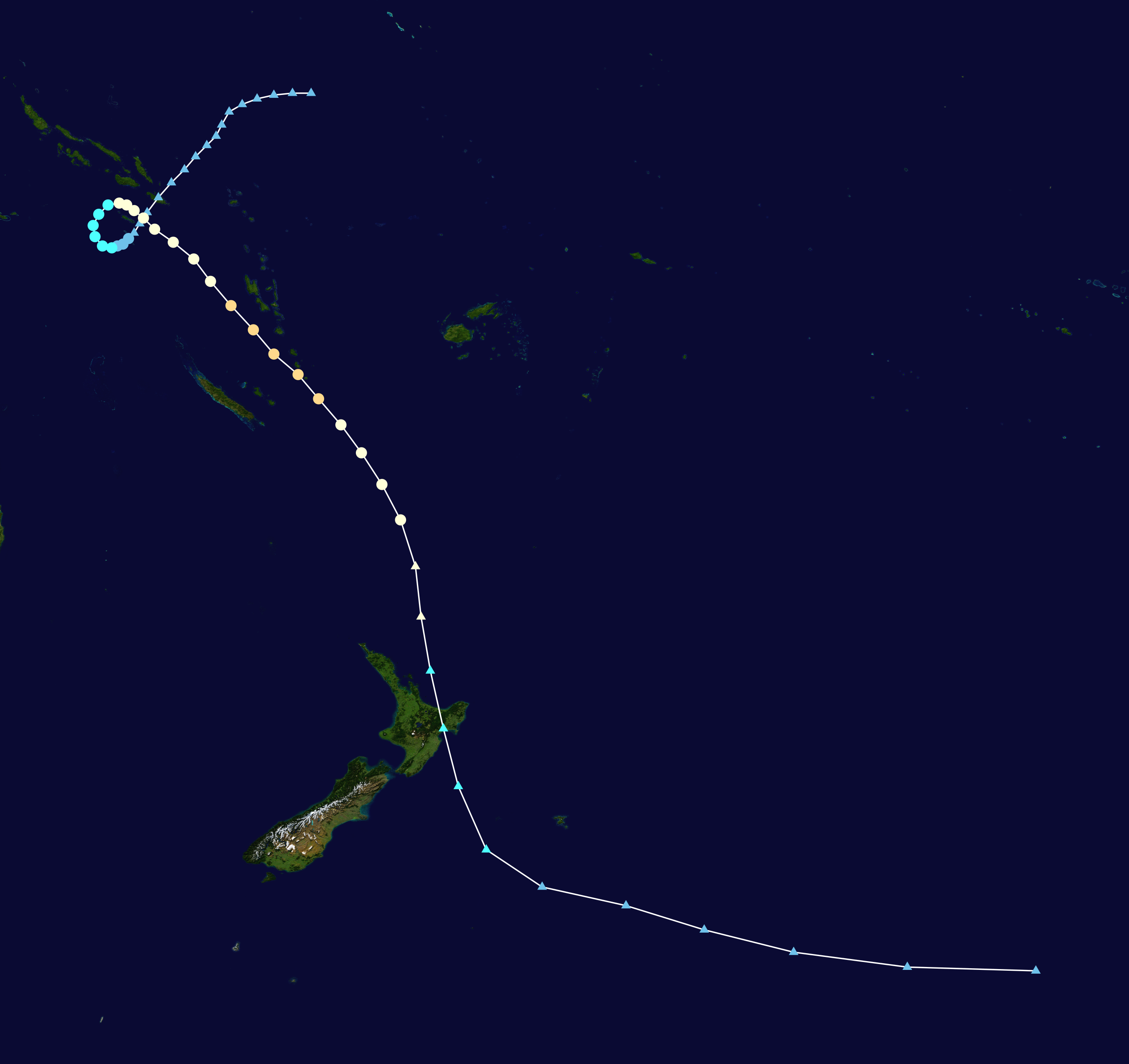
- Duration: December 23 – December 30 (Out of basin from December 23–25)
- Peak intensity: 150 km/h (90 mph) (10-min); 955 hPa (mbar)

Fergus was a Category 2 storm that formed in the Pacific Ocean, lasting from 29 December to 31 December 1996 until becoming extratropical near New Zealand. The storm dropped heavy rainfall across an already saturated area, with totals of over 16.5 inches (425 mm) near Thames. The rainfall led to widespread flooding and forced many to evacuate. Severe road damage occurred, with some roads remaining closed for over a week. Gusty winds from Fergus downed trees and power lines, and caused property damage. Cyclone Fergus brought torrential rain and damaging winds to parts of the North Island of New Zealand. There was no loss of life, in part because of timely warnings about the ferocity of the storm. Damages from the storm were at least $2 million.

=== Severe Tropical Cyclone Drena ===
- Category 3 severe tropical cyclone (Australian scale)
- Category 3 tropical cyclone (SSHWS)
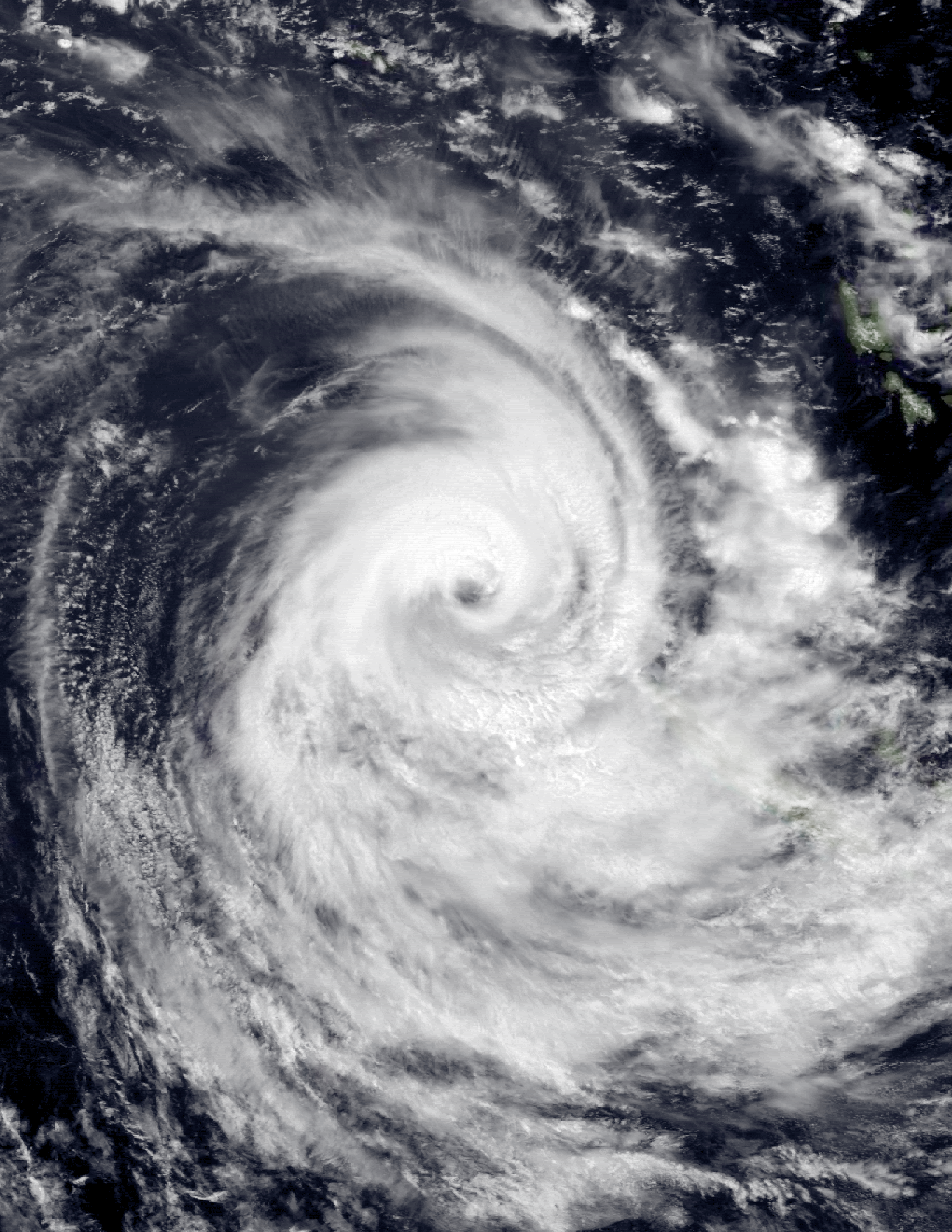
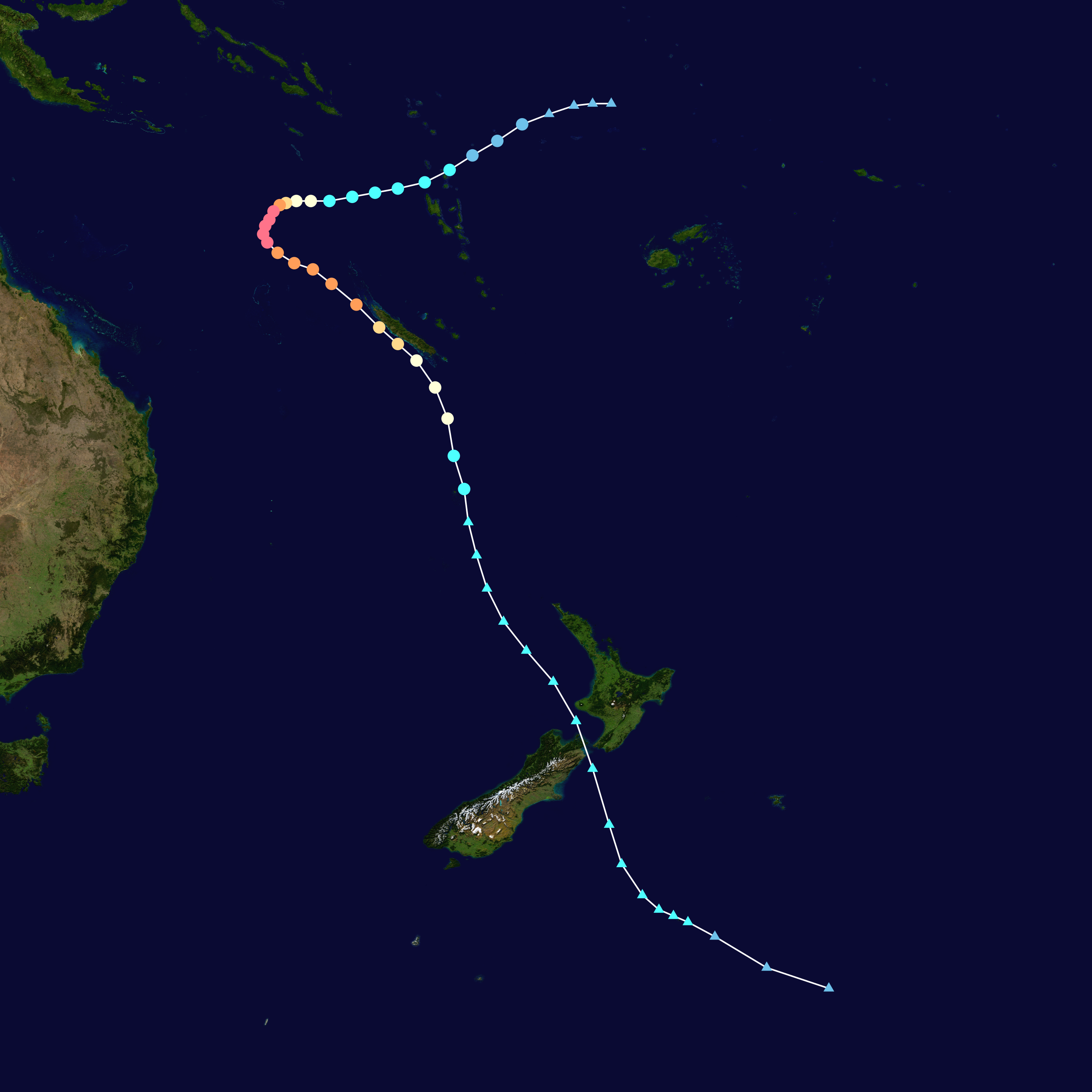
- Duration: January 3 – January 10 (Out of basin from January 4–6)
- Peak intensity: 155 km/h (100 mph) (10-min); 945 hPa (mbar)

On January 8, the weakening Cyclone Drena brushed the island of New Caledonia with sustained winds up to 150 km/h (90 mph 10-minute winds). Heavy rains accompanied the storm, peaking at 474 mm (18.7 in) in Dzumac. La Foa also recorded 202 mm (8.0 in) of rain. Wind gusts reached 165 km/h (105 mph) in Koumac. Flooding from the storm caused a total loss of crops and the high winds knocked out power and communication to most of the island.

=== Severe Tropical Cyclone Evan ===
- Category 3 severe tropical cyclone (Australian scale)
- Category 1 tropical cyclone (SSHWS)
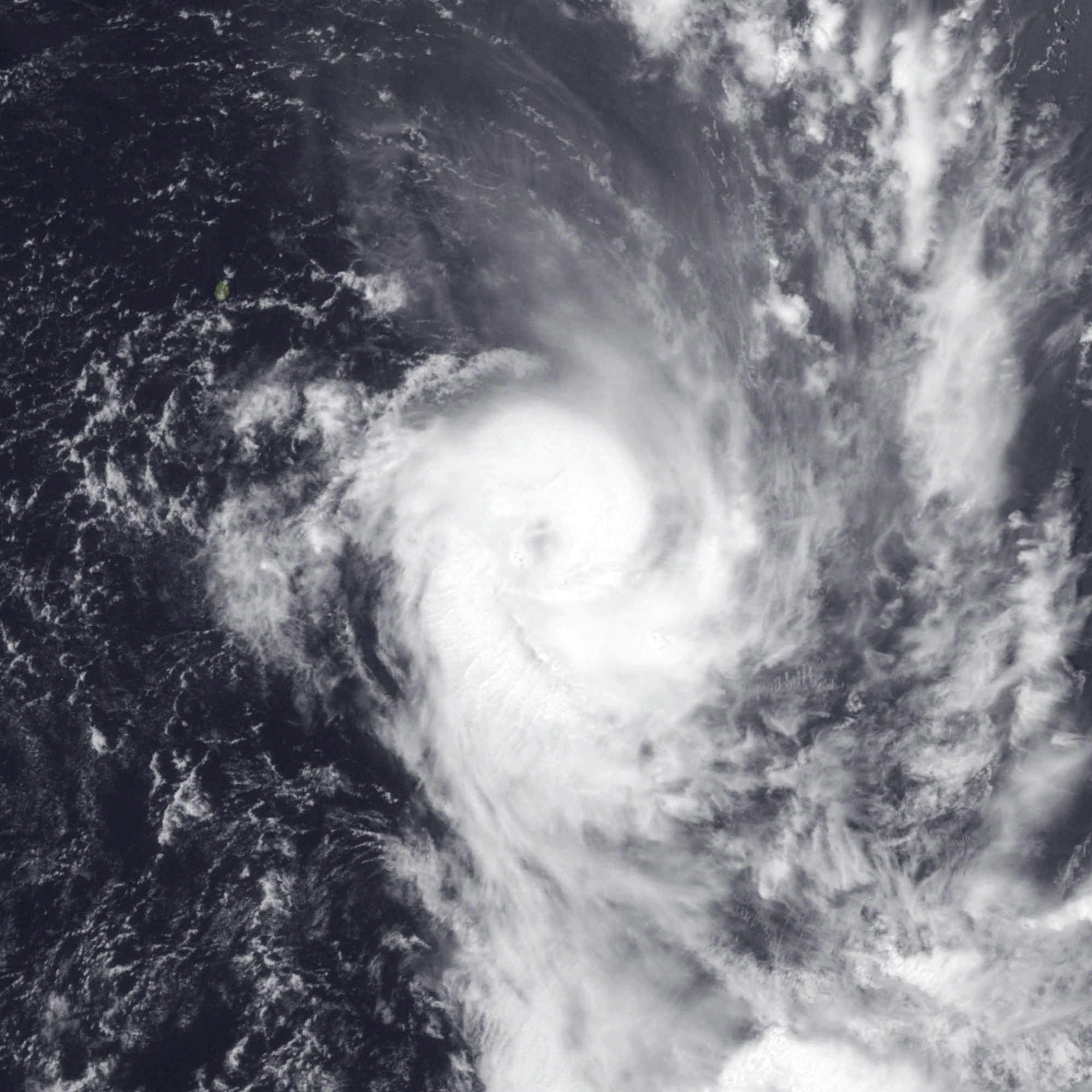
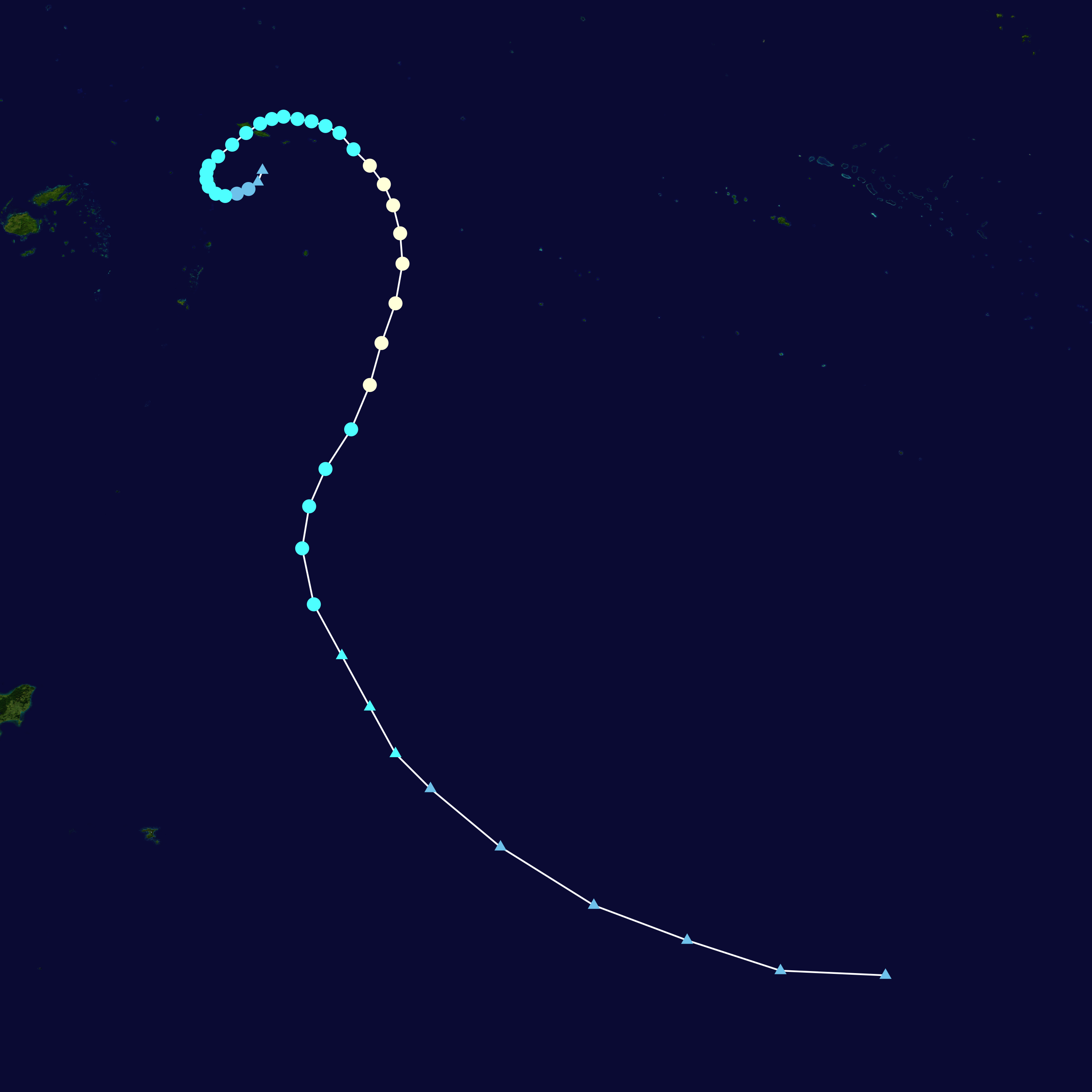
- Duration: January 10 – January 16
- Peak intensity: 130 km/h (80 mph) (10-min); 965 hPa (mbar)

Severe Tropical Cyclone Evan formed on January 10 and dissipated on January 16. Evan stayed northeast of New Zealand for its entire lifetime. Sustained winds peaked at 120 km/h (75 mph).

=== Tropical Cyclone Freda ===
- Category 2 tropical cyclone (Australian scale)
- Category 1 tropical cyclone (SSHWS)
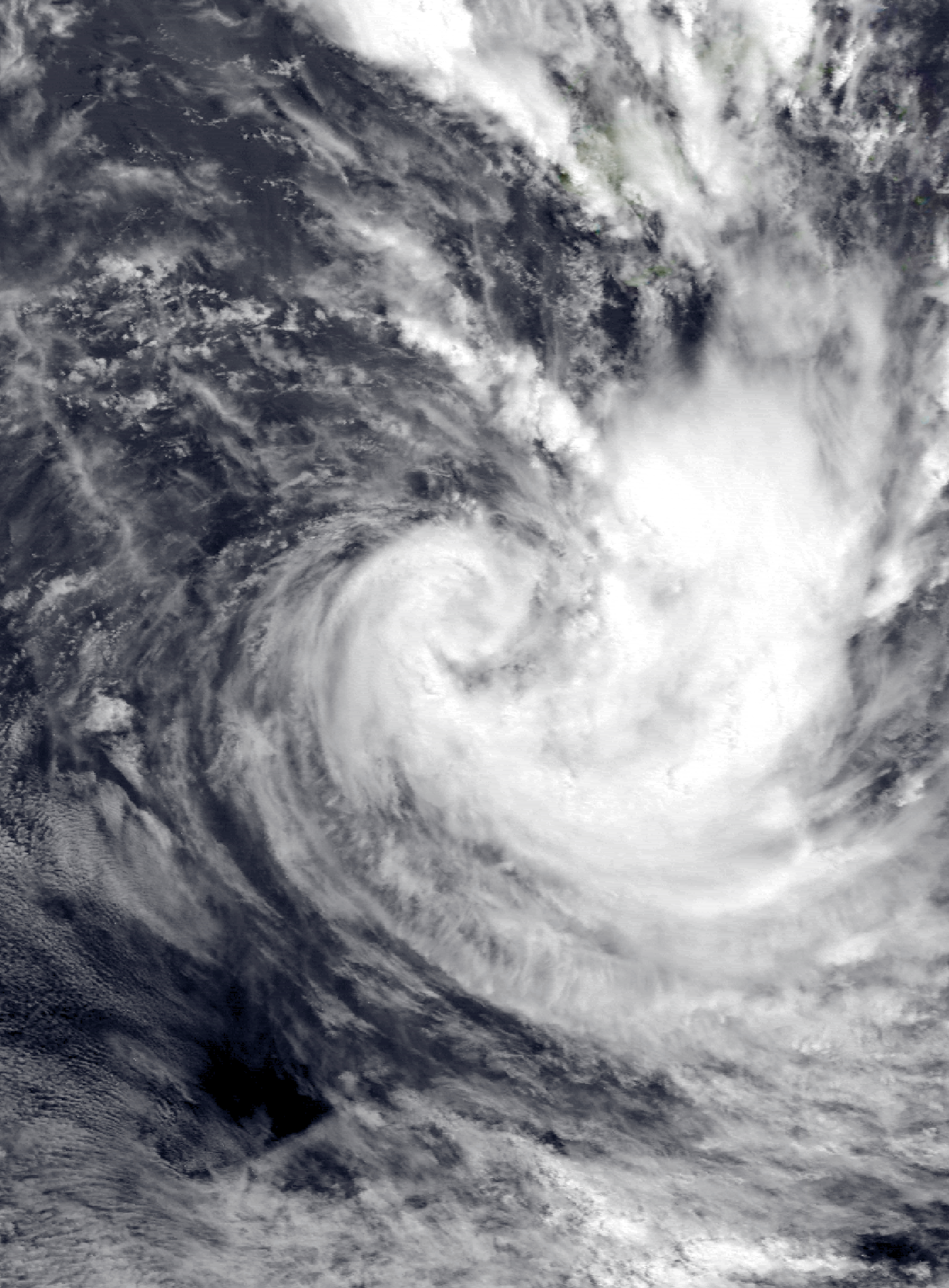
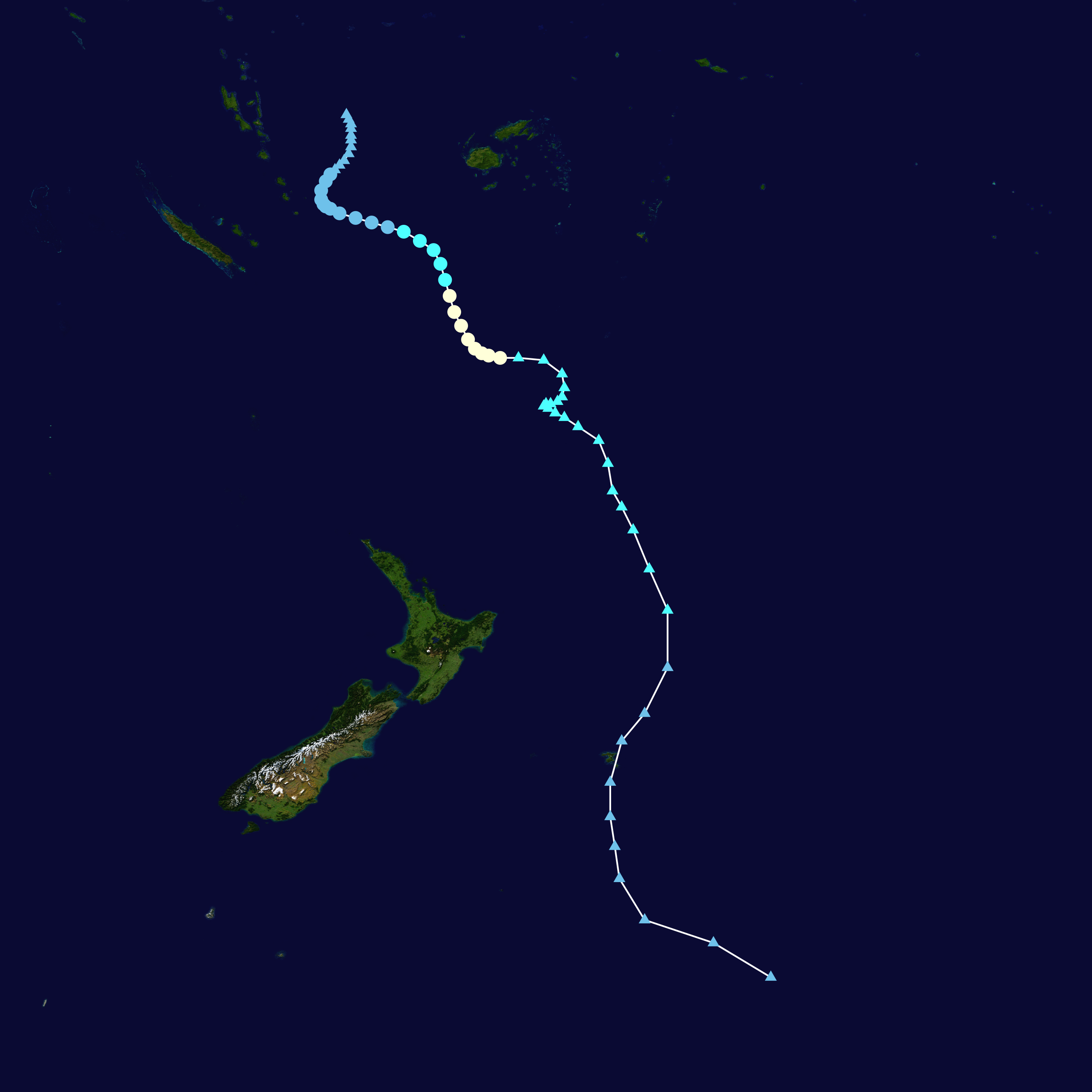
- Duration: January 26 – January 29
- Peak intensity: 110 km/h (70 mph) (10-min); 980 hPa (mbar)

Tropical Cyclone Freda existed from January 19 to February 2.

=== Tropical Cyclone Harold ===
- Category 2 tropical cyclone (Australian scale)
- Tropical storm (SSHWS)
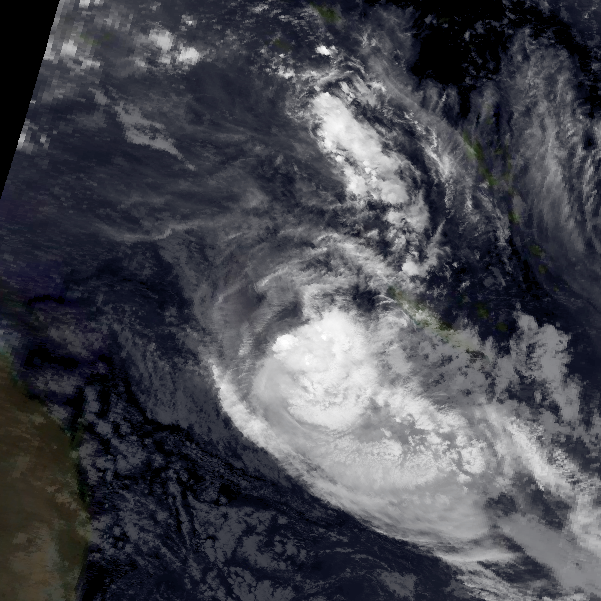
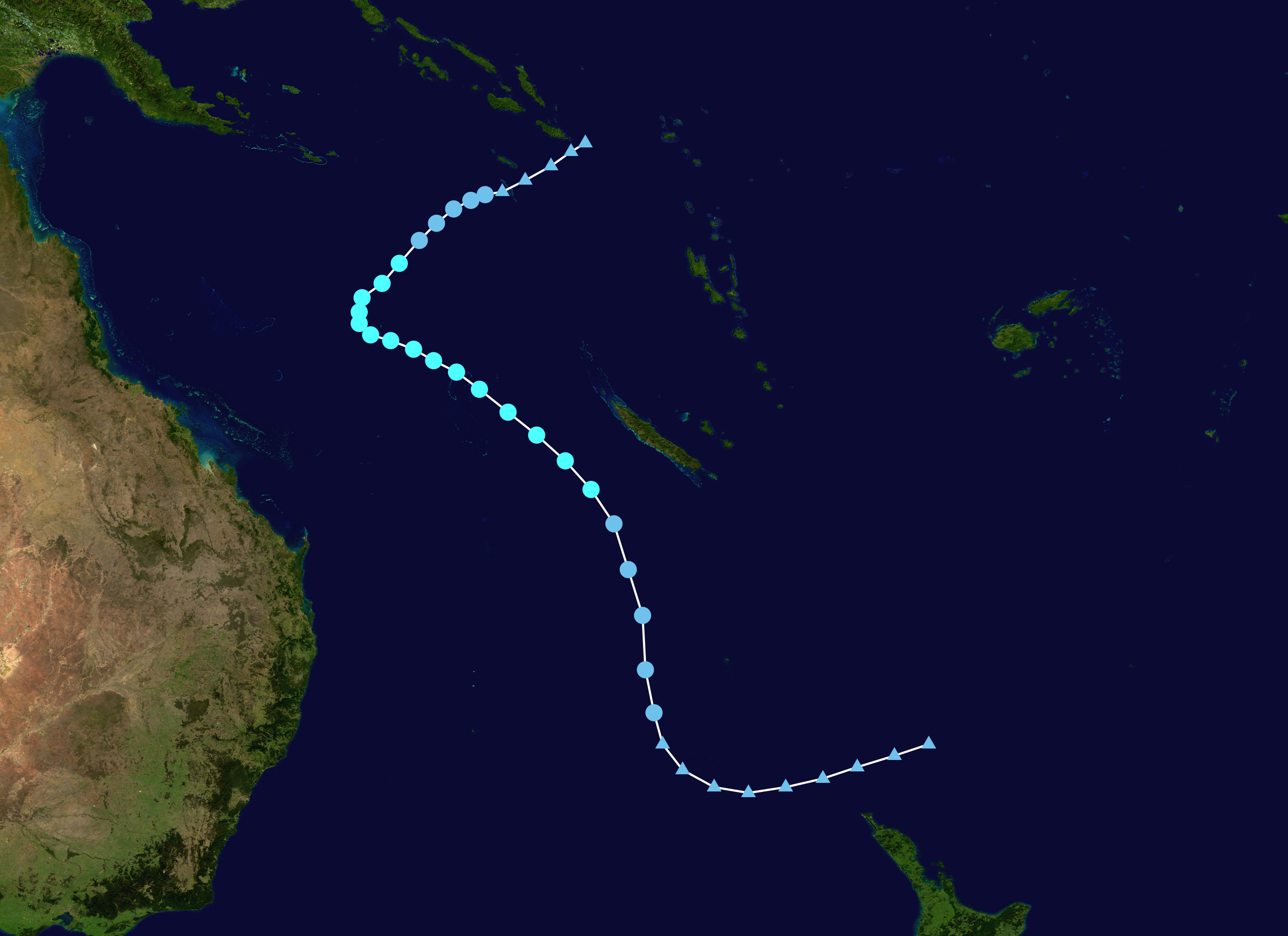
- Duration: February 19 (Entered basin) – February 22
- Peak intensity: 95 km/h (60 mph) (10-min); 985 hPa (mbar)

On February 19, Harold moved into the basin from the Australian region as a weakening Category 2 tropical cyclone,

The storm produced large swells along west-facing coasts of New Caledonia.

=== Tropical Cyclone 29P ===
- Category 2 tropical cyclone (Australian scale)
- Tropical storm (SSHWS)
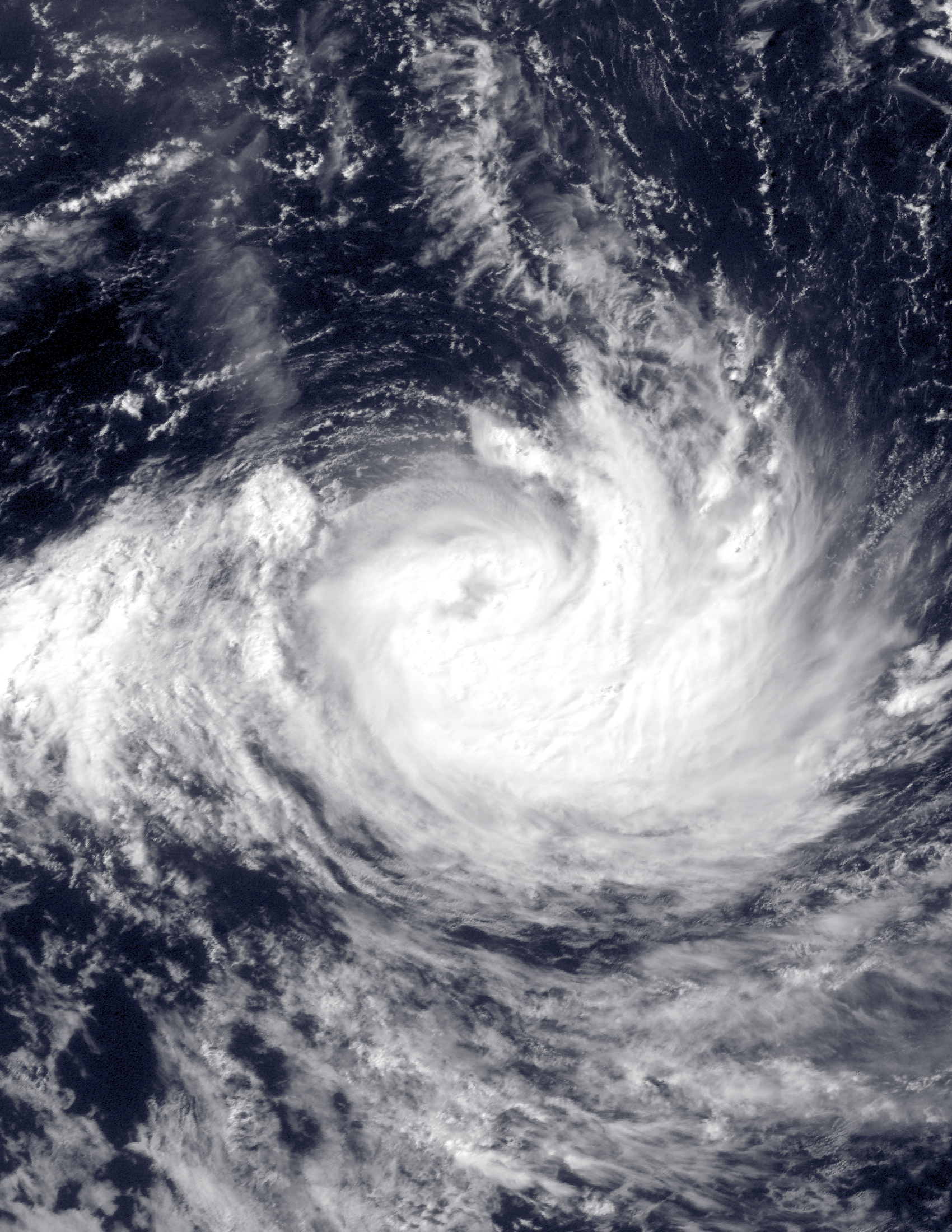
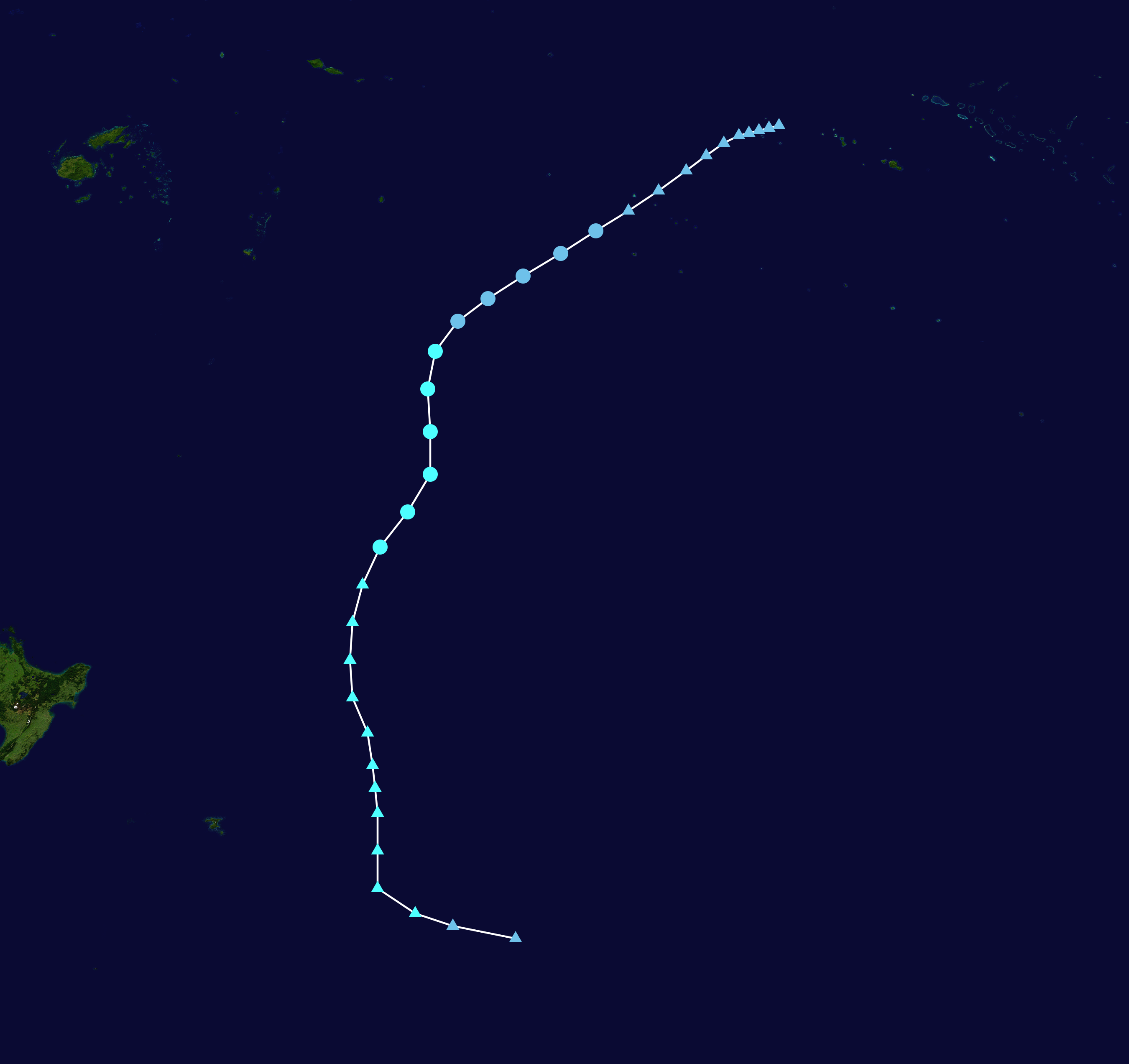
- Duration: February 23 – February 27
- Peak intensity: 110 km/h (70 mph) (10-min); 975 hPa (mbar)

On February 23, a depression formed near the Southern Cook Islands and gradually developed further over the next couple of days, as it moved south-westwards over the open seas. On February 25, the system moved into MetService's area of responsibility where it started to bear the hallmarks of a tropical cyclone and thus MetService discussed the possibility of naming the system with the FMS. At the time there was no precedent of a tropical cyclone being named in the South Pacific while located to the south of 25°S and nobody knew if MetService should take a name from the FMS list of names for the region or make one up. As a result, it was decided to treat the system as a depression operationally, before it was classified as an unnamed tropical cyclone in post-analysis. At around 15:00 UTC+12 (03:00 UTC) on February 26, visible satellite imagery showed that the system had developed a ragged eye, which suggested that the system was at or near hurricane strength. 3 hours later, the "Capitaine Tasman" encountered the system and recorded 10-minute sustained winds of 110 km/h (70 mph) near the centre, which made it a category 2 tropical cyclone on the Australian Scale. Later that day, the NPMOC initiated advisories on the system, designated it as Tropical Cyclone 29P and estimated peak 1-minute sustained windspeeds of 85 km/h (50 mph).

=== Severe Tropical Cyclone Gavin ===
- Category 4 severe tropical cyclone (Australian scale)
- Category 4 tropical cyclone (SSHWS)
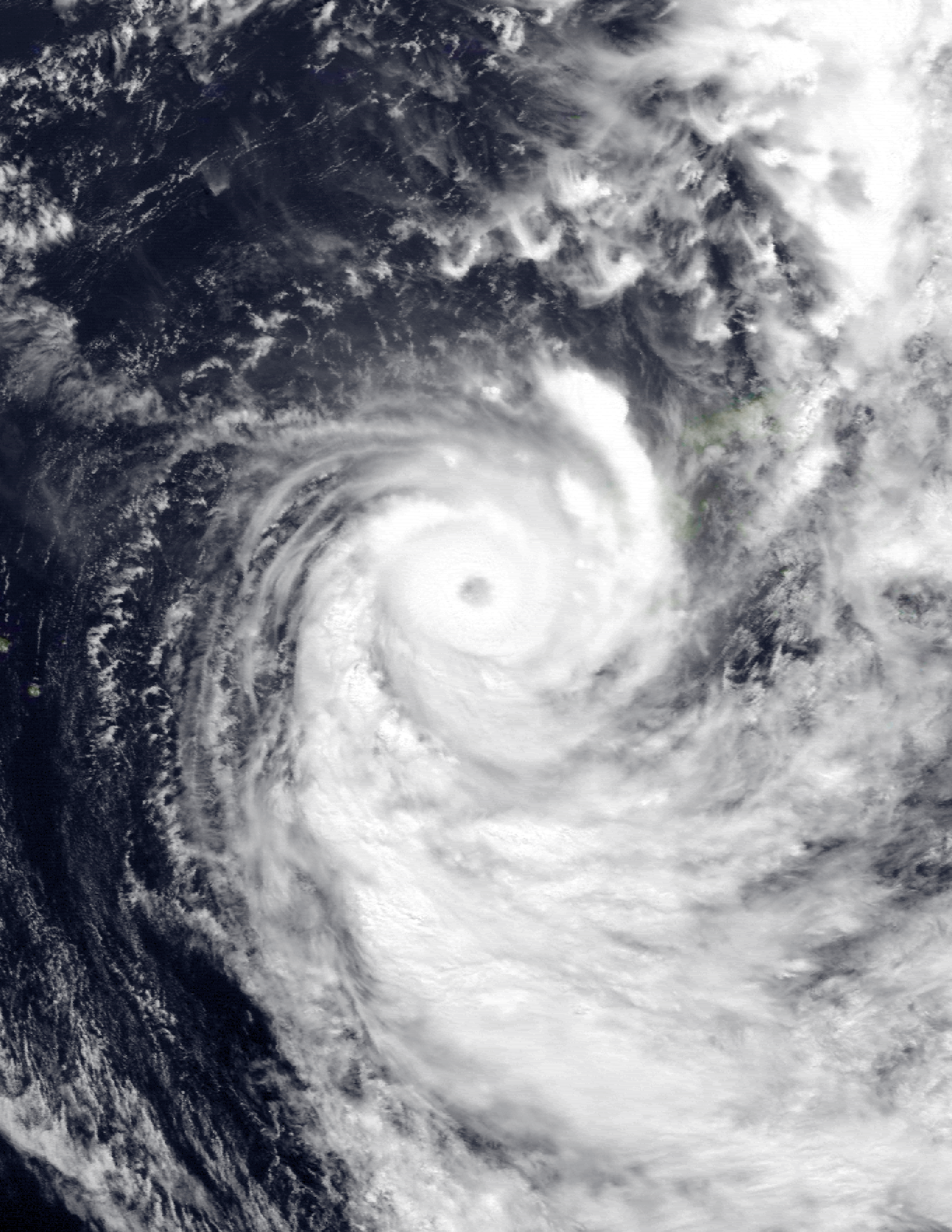
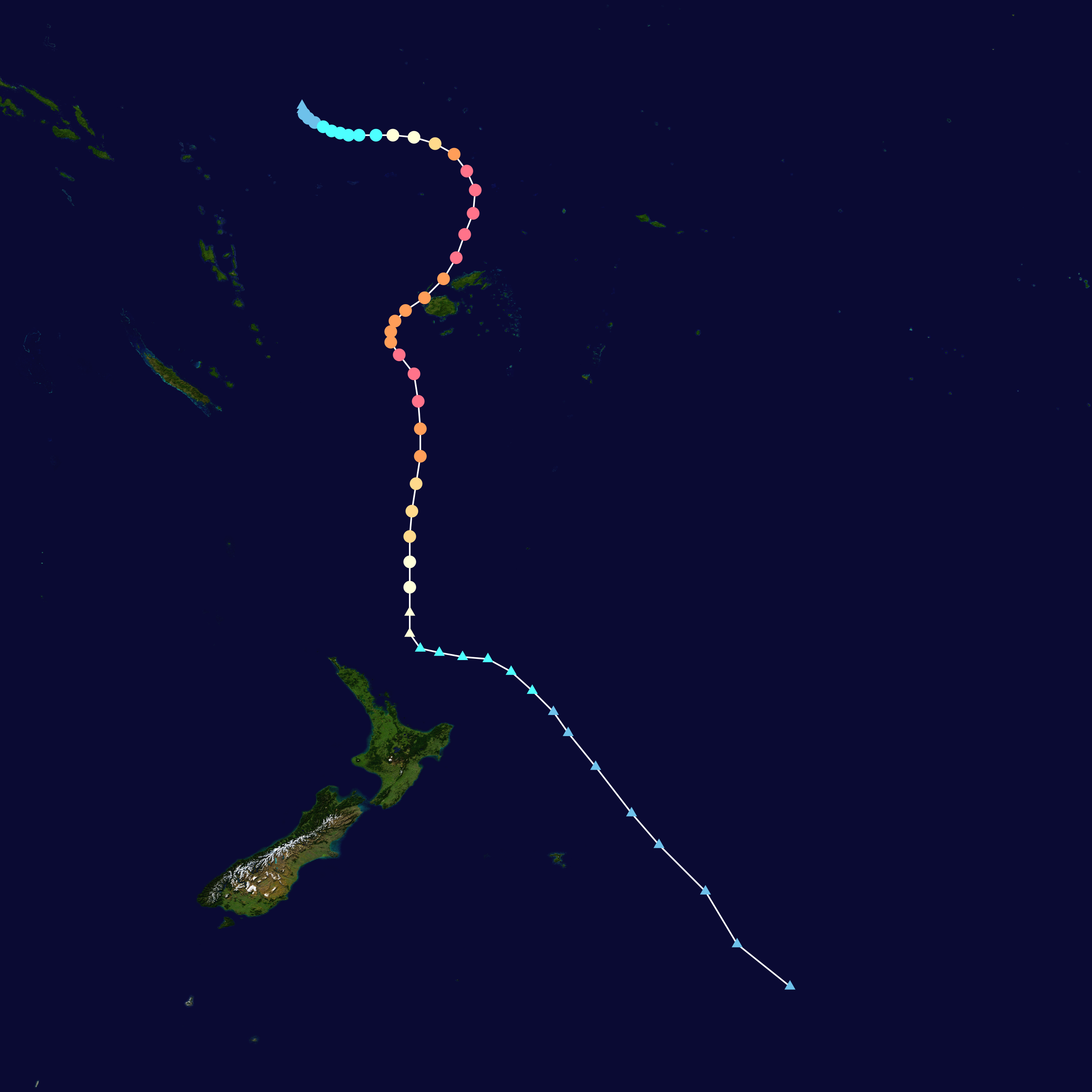
- Duration: March 3 – March 12
- Peak intensity: 185 km/h (115 mph) (10-min); 925 hPa (mbar)

Damages from the storm in Fiji amounted to $27 million. Seven people were killed and 18 others were listed as missing due to Cyclone Gavin.

=== Severe Tropical Cyclone Hina ===
- Category 3 severe tropical cyclone (Australian scale)
- Category 1 tropical cyclone (SSHWS)
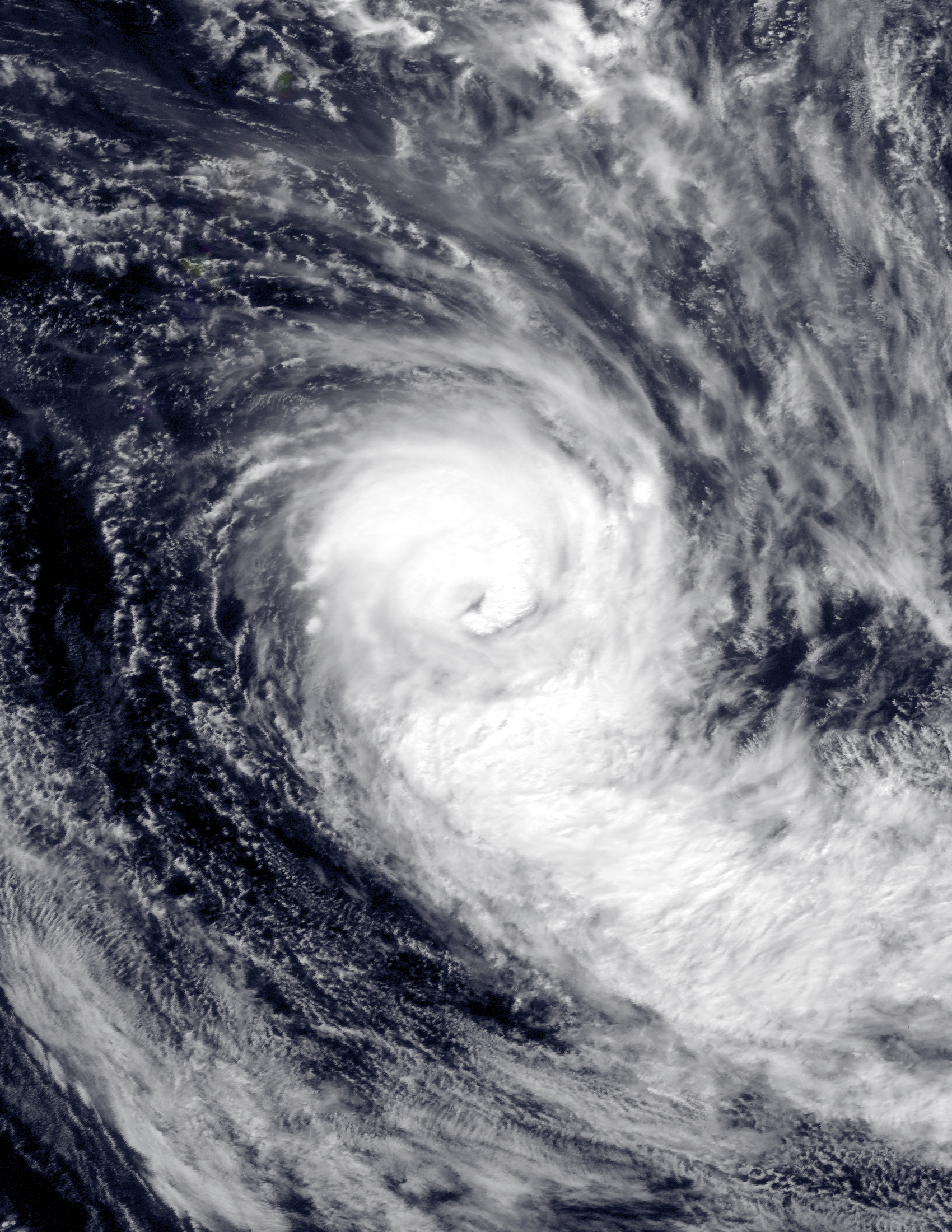
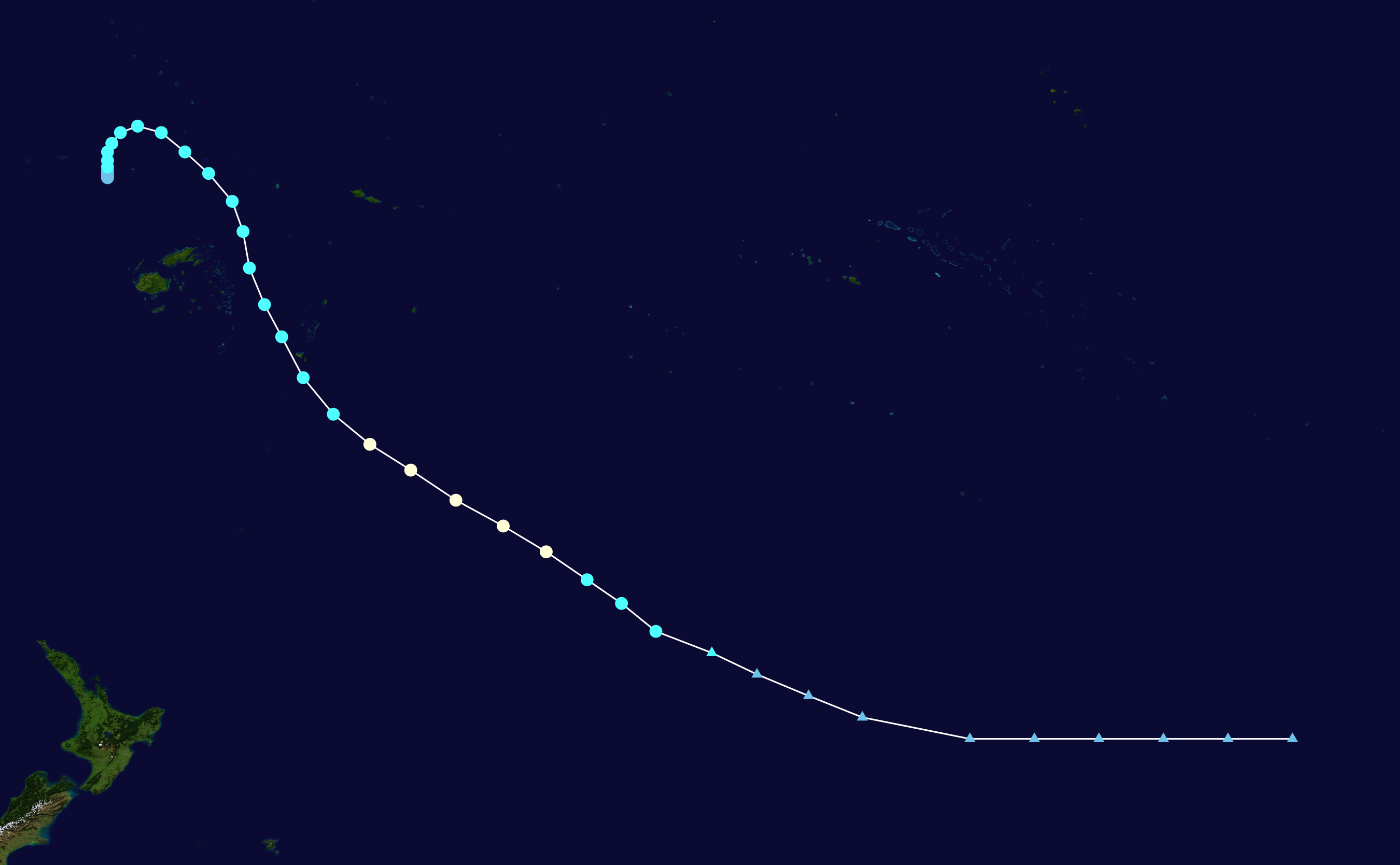
- Duration: March 12 – March 18
- Peak intensity: 120 km/h (75 mph) (10-min); 970 hPa (mbar)

On March 11, the FMS started to monitor a shallow depression, that had developed along the monsoon trough near Rotuma. Over the next two days the depression remained near Rotuma with no preferred movement, as it started to develop further within favourable conditions for further development. During March 13, the JTWC subsequently initiated advisories on the system and designated it as Tropical Cyclone 33P. During that day the system continued its northwards movement until it curved eastwards and later south-eastwards during March 14, before it passed about 55 km (35 mi) to the southeast of Niulakita the southernmost island of Tuvalu. Early on March 15, after the system had passed near Niulakita, the FMS reported that the depression had developed into a category 1 tropical cyclone and named it Hina. After being named the system accelerated towards the south-southeast and an area of increasing vertical wind shear, as it passed near the west coast of Futuna Island. The system also crossed the 180th meridian during that day, which prompted the JTWC to pass the responsibility for warning the United States Government to the NPMOC.

Early on March 16, the FMS reported that based on satellite imagery and guidance from other meteorological centers, the system had 10-minute sustained wind speeds of 85 km/h (55 mph) as it passed over Southern Tonga. Hina subsequently passed over the islands of Tongatapu and ʻEua in southern Tonga at around 0830 UTC and took less than 2 hours to inflict considerable damage on the islands. The system subsequently emerged back into the South Pacific Ocean, with the FMS estimating that the system had storm force winds of about 95 km/h (60 mph). Later that day the NPMOC estimated that Hina had peak 1-minute sustained windspeeds of 110 km/h (70 mph) as it rapidly moved below 25°S and out of the FMS's area of responsibility. After impacting Tonga the system moved rapidly towards the south-southeast and weakened below tropical cyclone intensity, before it was last noted on March 21, to the south of the Pitcairn Islands. During the systems post analysis it was determined that the warning centres had underestimated Hina's intensity as it passed over Tonga, after damage had been greater than expected in the island nation. the FMS subsequently deduced that Hina was a minimal category 3 severe tropical cyclone, with peak 10-minute sustained wind speeds of 120 km/h (75 mph) when it impacted Tonga. The NPMOC also revised their estimate of Hina's peak 1-minute sustained wind speeds from 110 km/h (70 mph) to 140 km/h (85 mph) during post analysis, which made the system equivalent to a category one hurricane on the Saffir–Simpson hurricane wind scale.

Cyclone Hina caused widespread damage in Tonga, leaving roughly $14.5 million in damages. About 320 families were left homeless after the storm.

=== Tropical Cyclone Ian ===
- Category 1 tropical cyclone (Australian scale)
- Tropical storm (SSHWS)
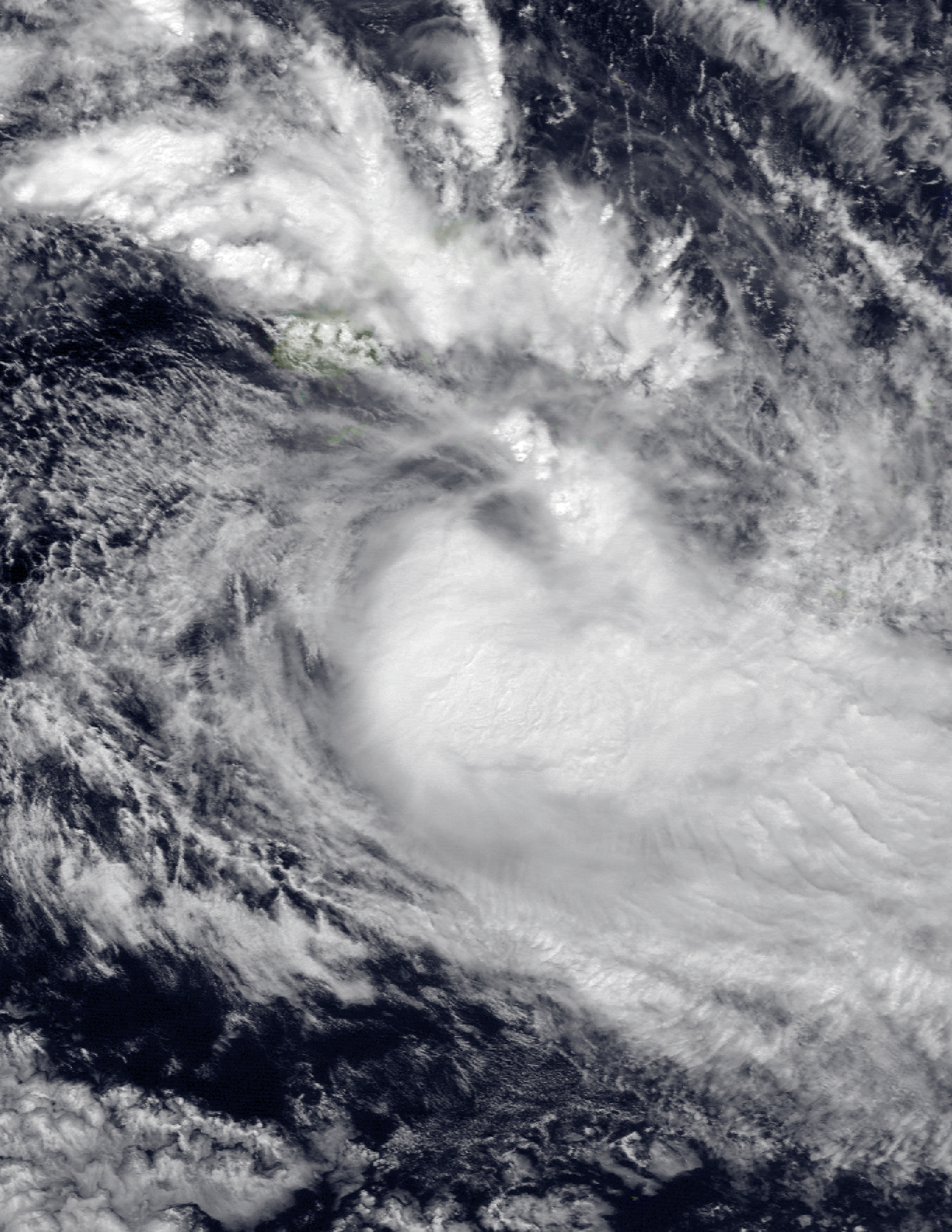
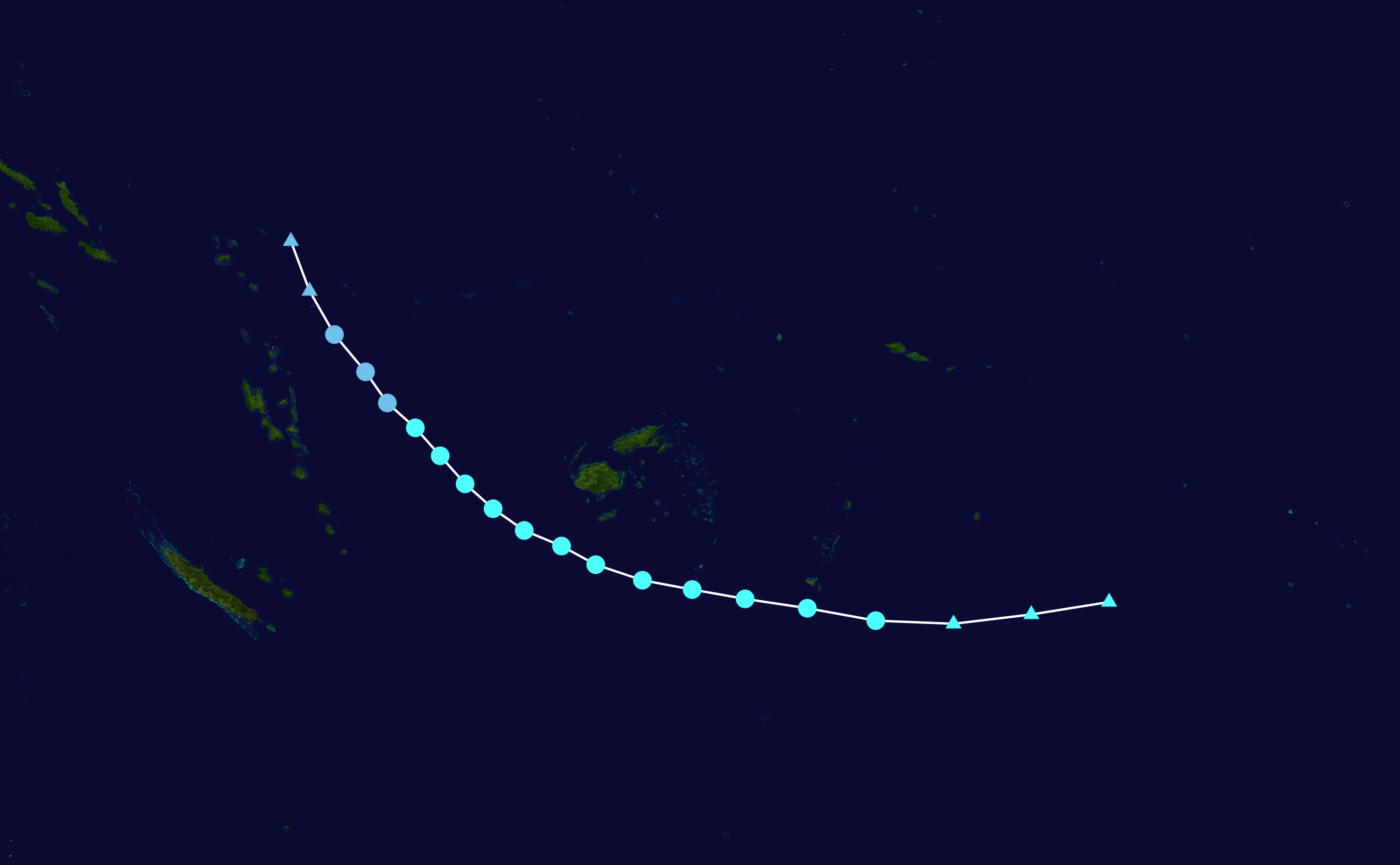
- Duration: April 13 – April 19
- Peak intensity: 85 km/h (50 mph) (10-min); 987 hPa (mbar)

On April 12, after analysing reports from various weather stations in the region, the FMS reported that a circulation had developed within a monsoon trough in the area between Rotuma and the Santa Cruz Islands. Over the next few days, the circulation developed into a tropical depression, as it moved southeastwards parallel to the islands of Vanuatu, under the influence of a subtropical ridge of high pressure. During April 17, the JTWC initiated advisories on the system and designated it as Tropical Cyclone 34P, before the FMS named it Ian after it had become a category 1 tropical cyclone on the Australian scale.

=== Tropical Cyclone June ===
- Category 2 tropical cyclone (Australian scale)
- Category 1 tropical cyclone (SSHWS)
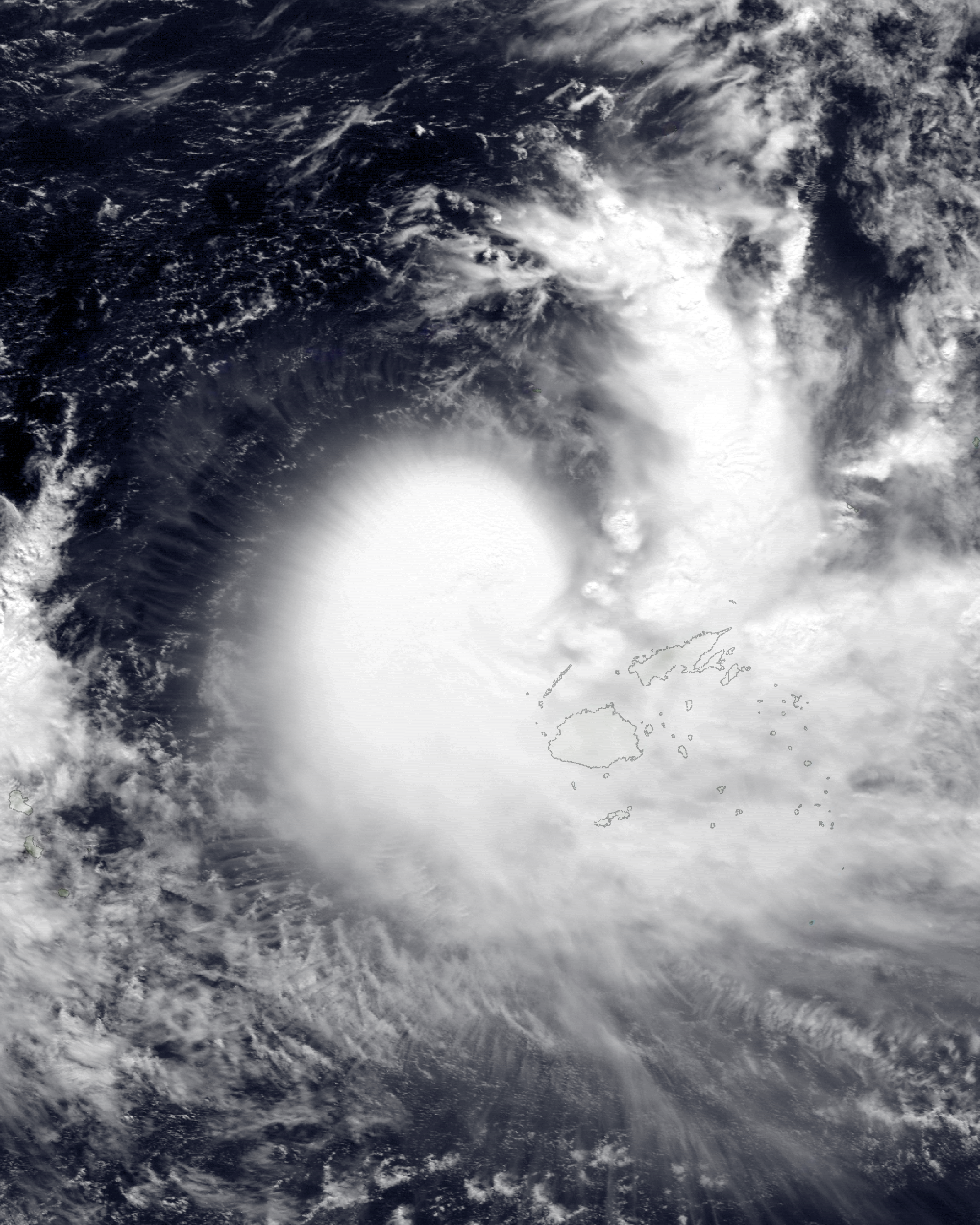
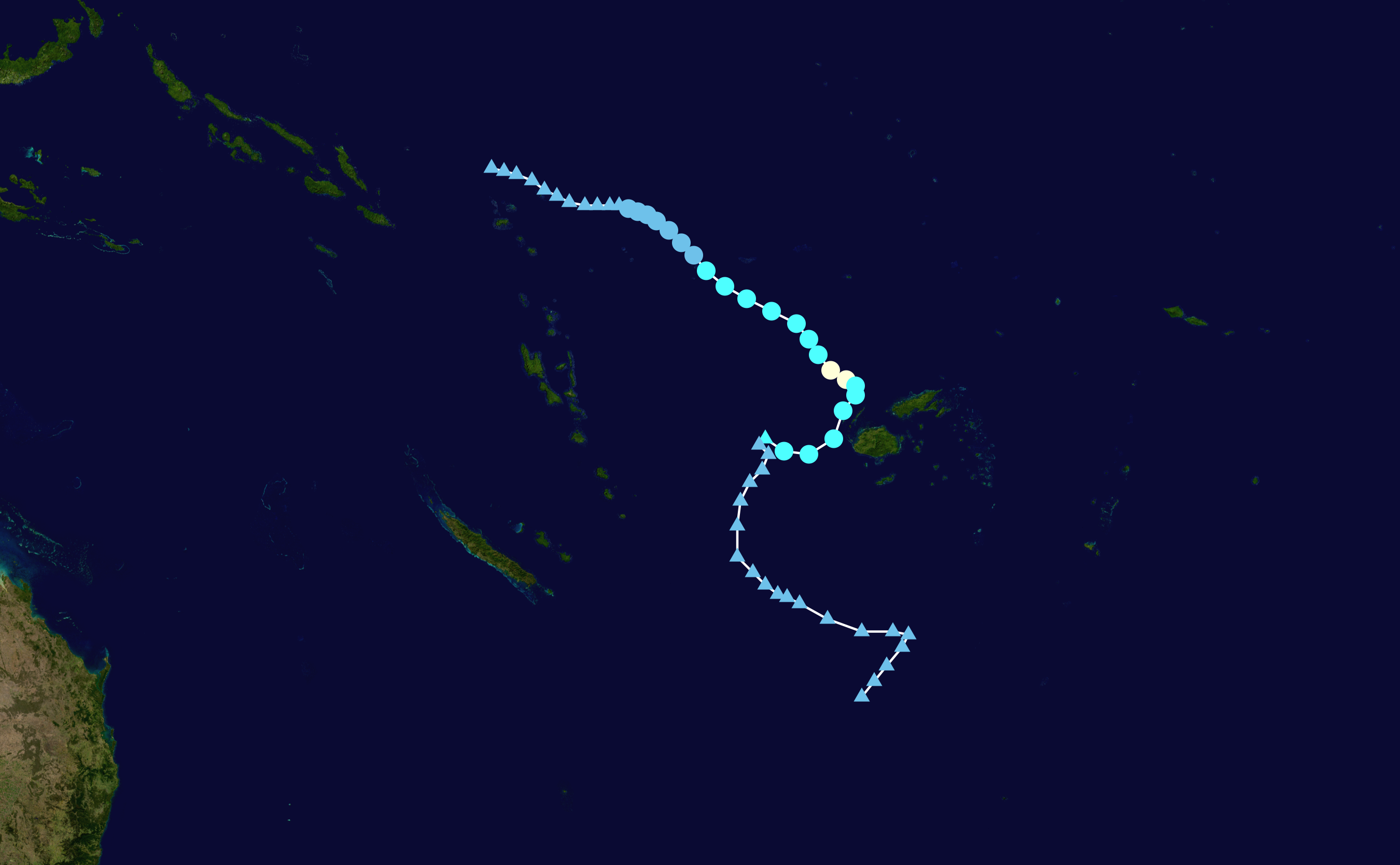
- Duration: May 2 – May 5
- Peak intensity: 95 km/h (60 mph) (10-min); 985 hPa (mbar)

On April 30, the FMS started to monitor a weak area of low pressure that had developed to the northwest of the Fijian dependency of Rotuma. Over the next couple of days, the system remained poorly organised under the influence of vertical wind shear, from the northwest as it moved slowly towards the south-southwest. During May 2, subsequently initiated advisories on the system and designated it as Tropical Cyclone 35P, after the vertical wind shear surrounding the system, had relaxed and good outflow had developed aloft. During that day the system started to move towards the south-southeast and rapidly developed before the FMS reported later that day, that the system had developed into a category 1 tropical cyclone and named it June. At this stage the system was located about 600 km (375 mi) to the northwest of Nadi, Fiji, and was expected to turn towards the southwest and a break in the subtropical ridge of high pressure during the next day. During May 3, the system continued to develop further and became slow moving, before it started to appear on radar imagery later that day. The FMS subsequently reported early the next day that the system had peaked as a category 2 tropical cyclone, with 10-minute sustained wind speeds of 95 km/h (60 mph). Later that day the JTWC reported that the system had peaked with 1-minute sustained wind speeds of 120 km/h (75 mph), which made June equivalent to a category 1 hurricane on the SSHWS. Severe flooding produced by the storm in Fiji left roughly $500,000 in damages.

=== Tropical Cyclone 37P ===
- Tropical storm (SSHWS)
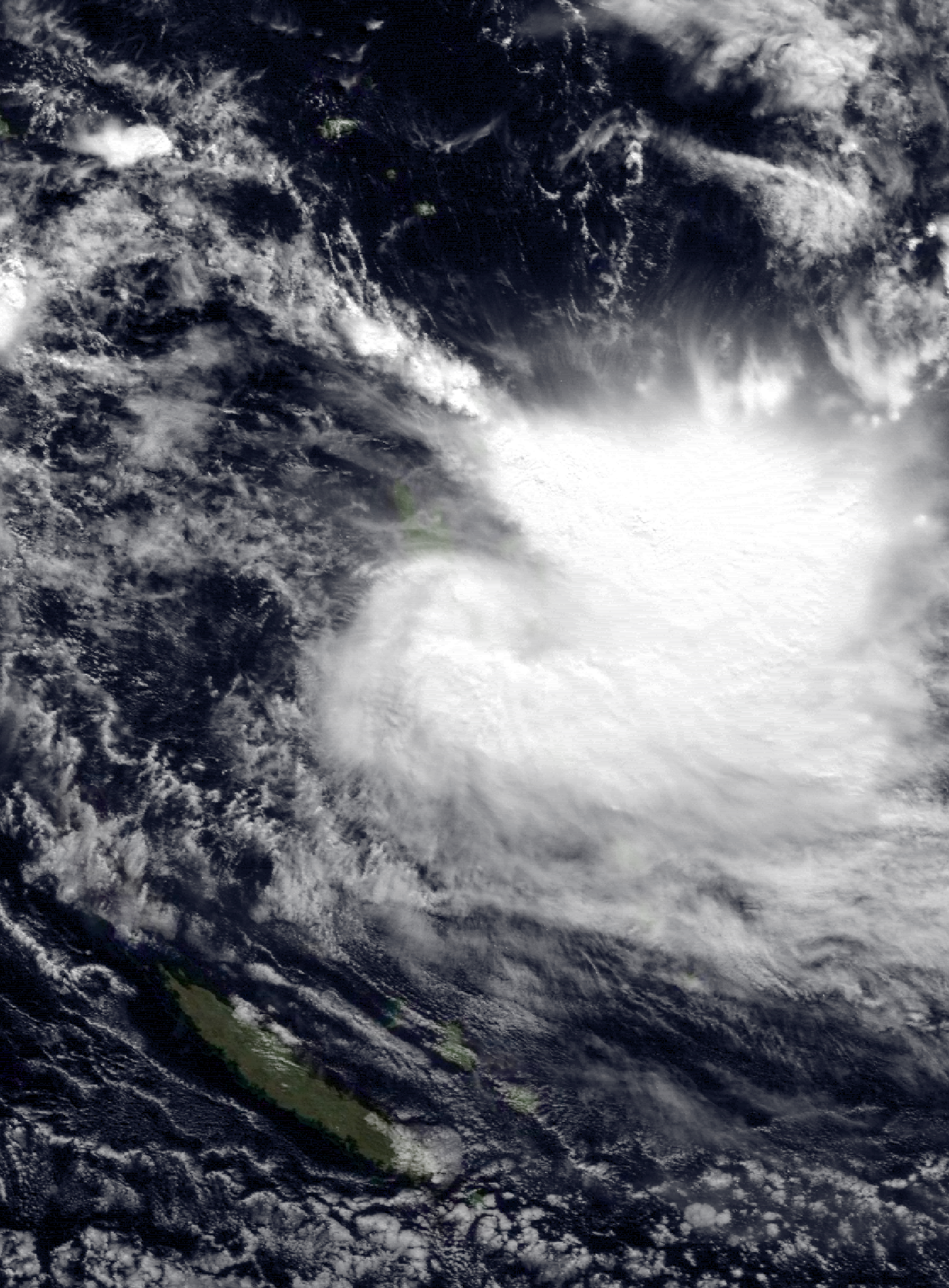
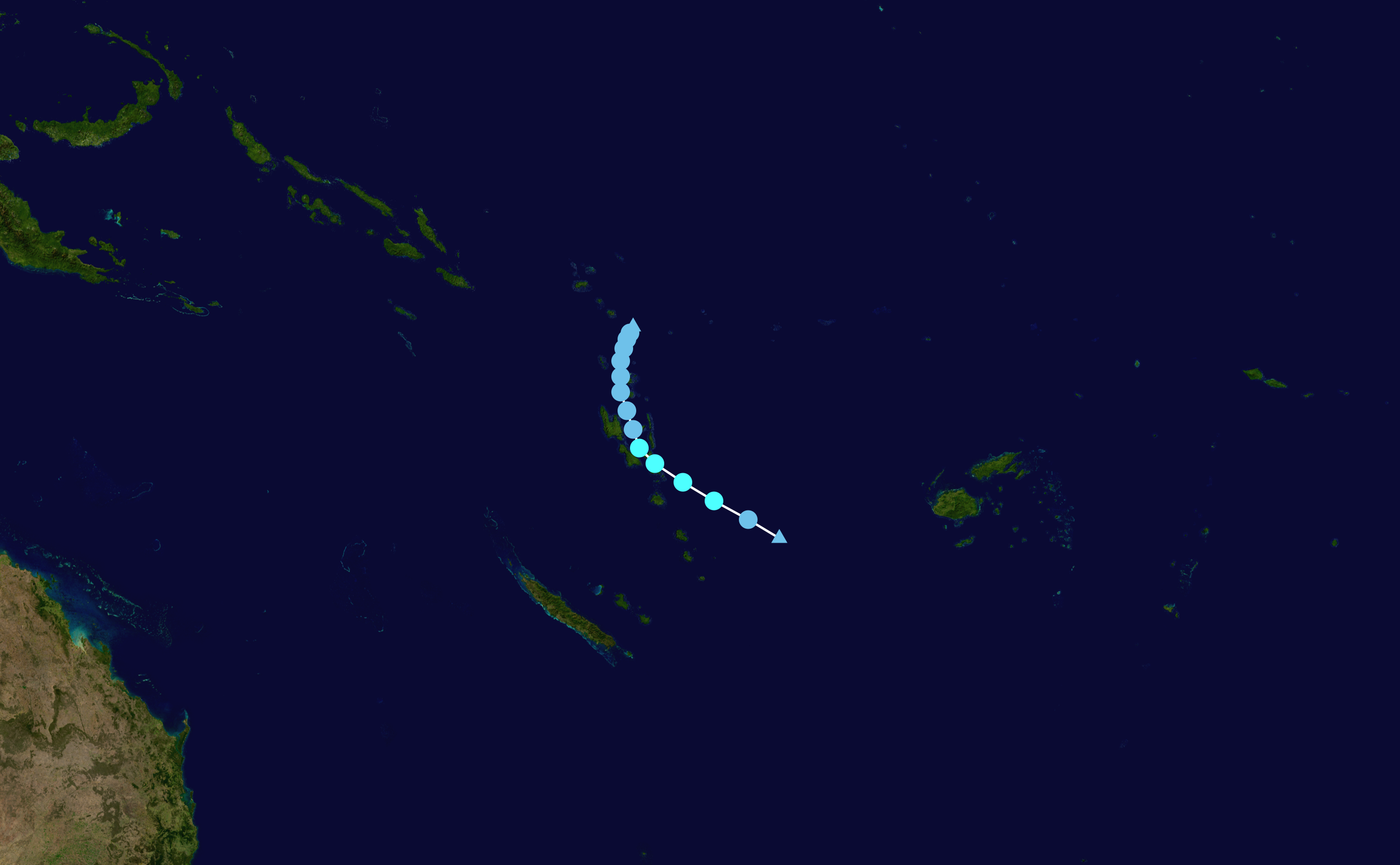
- Duration: May 27 – May 30
- Peak intensity: 65 km/h (40 mph) (1-min);

During May 26, the JTWC started monitoring a tropical disturbance that had developed to the southeast of the Solomon Islands, in response to strong westerly winds along the equator. Over the next two days the disturbance gradually developed further, before the JTWC initiated advisories on the system and designated it as Tropical Cyclone 37P during May 28. During the next day the system moved towards the south-southeast, before it peaked with 1-minute sustained wind speeds of 65 km/h (40 mph). During May 30, the system dissipated as a significant tropical cyclone, after it had encountered cooler waters and stronger vertical windshear.

=== Severe Tropical Cyclone Keli ===
- Category 3 severe tropical cyclone (Australian scale)
- Category 4 tropical cyclone (SSHWS)
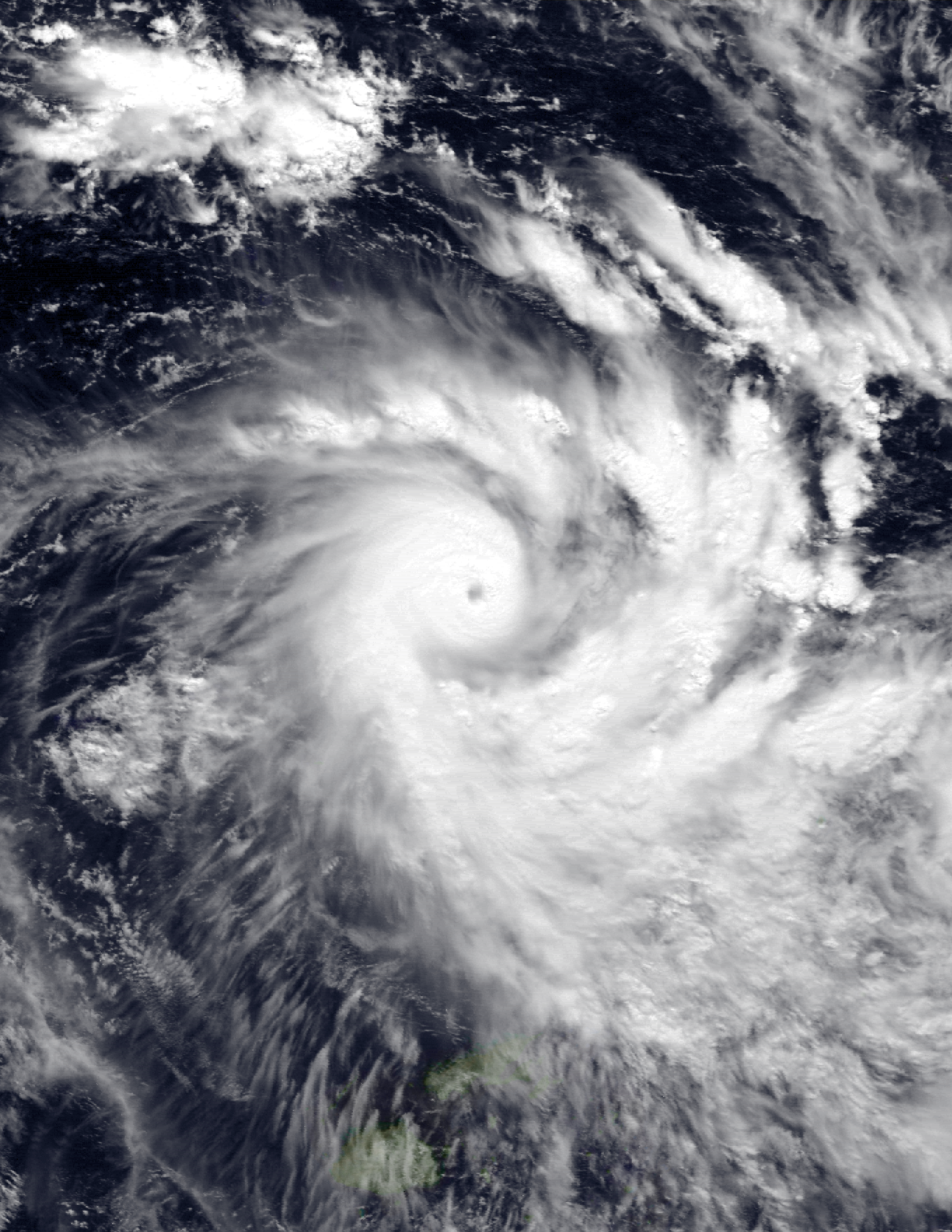
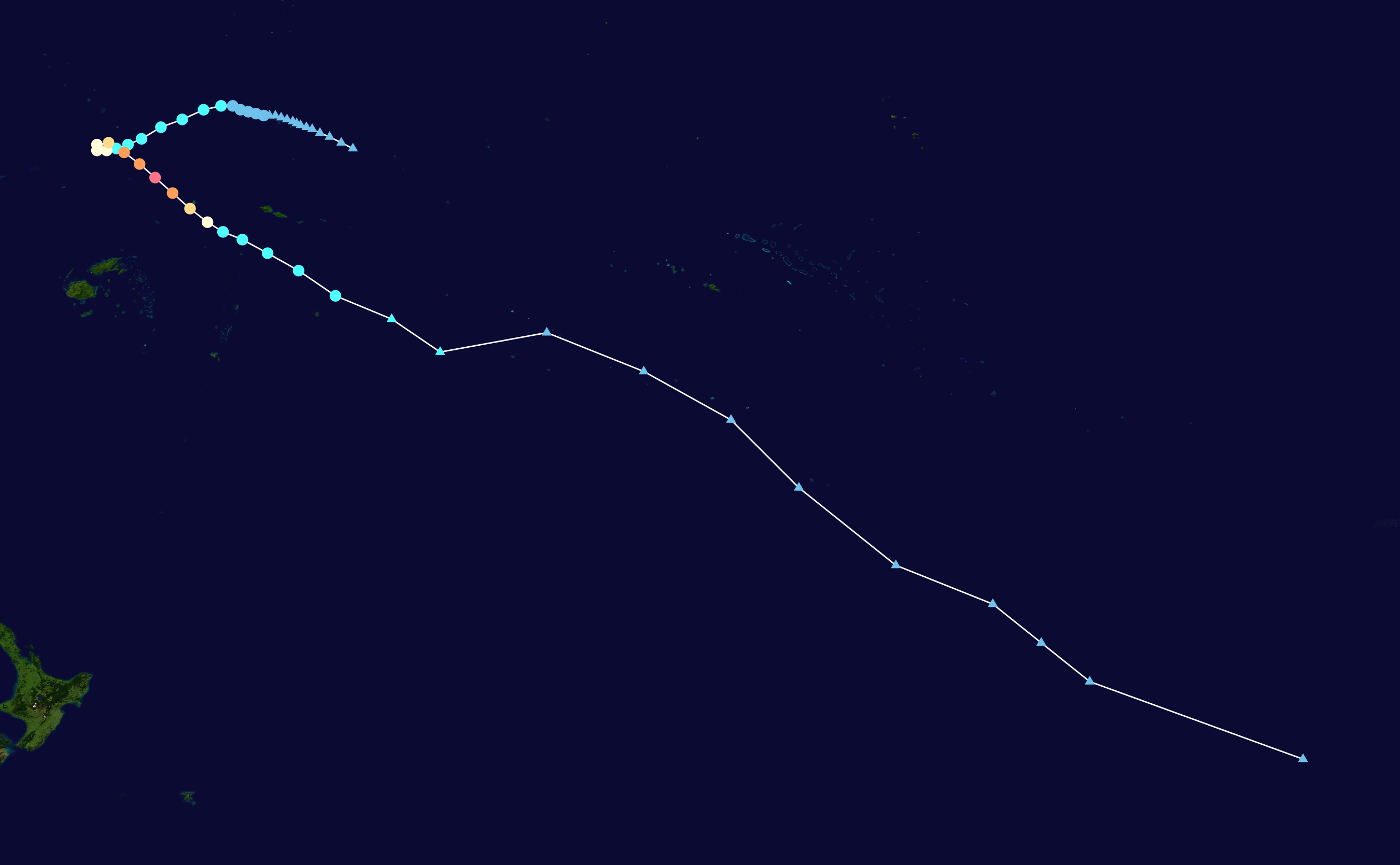
- Duration: June 7 – June 17
- Peak intensity: 150 km/h (90 mph) (10-min); 955 hPa (mbar)

During June 7, the FMS reported that a weak tropical low had emerged from the South Pacific Convergence Zone, to the northeast of Tokelau. Over the next couple of days, the low gradually developed further as it was steered slowly westwards by mid-level easterly winds, into an area of strong upper-level diffulence and an abnormal area of high sea-surface temperatures. During June 10, the NPMOC initiated advisories on the system and designated it as Tropical Cyclone 38P, before the FMS named the system Keli after it had developed into a category 1 tropical cyclone. At this stage, the system was located about 335 km (205 mi) to the northeast of Niulakita in Tuvalu and was moving south-westwards towards the island as it continued to gradually intensify. As Keli passed just to the north of Niulakita on June 11, its general movement slowed down, before it performed a clockwise cyclonic loop to the north of the island.

During June 12, the system accelerated south-eastwards and started to pose a threat to the French territory of Wallis and Futuna as it passed in between Niulakita and Nukulaelae. Later that day, at about 06:00 UTC (18:00 TVT), the FMS estimated that Keli had peaked in intensity as a category 3 severe tropical cyclone, with 10-minute sustained winds of 150 km/h (90 mph). Twelve hours later, the NPMOC reported that Keli had peaked with 1-minute sustained wind speeds of 215 km/h (130 mph), which made it equivalent to a Category 4 hurricane on the Saffir-Simpson hurricane wind scale. After it had peaked in intensity, Keli encountered higher levels of vertical windshear which caused it to start to weaken and transition into an extratropical cyclone, before it passed about 55 km (35 mi) to the west of Wallis during June 13. After the system had passed to the west of Wallis, Keli continued to move south-eastwards and weakened into a category 2 tropical cyclone, before it passed to the north of Niuatoputopu in northern Tonga and to the northeast of Niue during June 14. During the following day, the NPMOC reported that the system had degenerated into extratropical cyclone and issued their final advisory before the FMS reported that Keli had degenerated into a tropical depression. Later that day, the system's remnants passed near the island of Mauke in the Southern Cook Islands, before they were last noted during June 17, as they moved past 120°W.

=== Other system ===
On February 18, a tropical depression formed to the northeast of Fiji and moved southwestwards, before it was last noted during the next day.

== Season effects ==
This table lists all the storms that developed in the South Pacific basin, to the east of 160E during the 1996–97 season. It includes their intensity on the Australian tropical cyclone intensity scale, duration, name, areas affected, deaths, and damages. For most storms the data is taken from TCWC Nadi and Wellingtons archives, however data for 37P has been taken from the JTWC archives rather than RSMC Nadi and TCWC Wellington's archives, and thus the winds are a period of 1-minute sustained as opposed to 10-minutes.

1996–97 South Pacific cyclone season
| Name | Dates active | Peak intensity | | | Areas affected | Damage (US$) | Deaths | Refs |
| Name | Dates active | Category | Wind speed | Pressure | Areas affected | Damage (US$) | Deaths | Refs |
|---|---|---|---|---|---|---|---|---|
| Unnamed | November 19 – 22 | Tropical depression | Unknown | Unknown | None | None | None | |
| Cyril | November 23 – 26 | Category 1 tropical cyclone | 85 km/h (50 mph) | 987 hPa (29.15 inHg) | Solomon Islands, New Caledonia | Unknown | Unknown | |
| Fergus | December 20 – 30 | Category 3 severe tropical cyclone | 150 km/h (90 mph) | 955 hPa (28.20 inHg) | Solomon Islands, Vanuatu, New Caledonia, New Zealand | $2 million | Unknown | |
| Drena | January 3 – 10 | Category 4 severe tropical cyclone | 155 km/h (100 mph) | 935 hPa (27.61 inHg) | Vanuatu, New Caledonia, New Zealand | Unknown | Unknown | |
| Evan | January 4 – 14 | Category 3 severe tropical cyclone | 130 km/h (80 mph) | 965 hPa (28.50 inHg) | Fiji, Tonga | Unknown | Unknown | |
| Freda | January 26 – February 2 | Category 2 tropical cyclone | 110 km/h (70 mph) | 980 hPa (28.94 inHg) | None | Unknown | Unknown | |
| Harold | February 19 – 24 | Category 2 tropical cyclone | 110 km/h (70 mph) | 985 hPa (29.09 inHg) | Melanesia, Australia, New Zealand | $27 million | 7 | |
| 29P | February 24 – 26 | Category 2 tropical cyclone | 110 km/h (70 mph) | 975 hPa (28.79 inHg) | None | None | None | |
| Gavin | March 2 – 11 | Category 4 severe tropical cyclone | 185 km/h (115 mph) | 925 hPa (27.32 inHg) | Tuvalu, Wallis and Futuna, Fiji | $24.9 million | 18 | (Note: The damage total/economic loss was originally reported in Fijian dollars and was converted to USD via the Oanda Corporation website.) |
| Hina | March 13 – 18 | Category 3 severe tropical cyclone | 120 km/h (75 mph) | 970 hPa (28.64 inHg) | Tonga, Tuvalu, Wallis and Futuna | $15.2 million | 1 | |
| Ian | April 13 – 19 | Category 1 tropical cyclone | 85 km/h (50 mph) | 987 hPa (29.15 inHg) | Fiji | Minimal | None | |
| June | May 2 – 11 | Category 2 tropical cyclone | 95 km/h (60 mph) | 985 hPa (29.09 inHg) | Fiji | $60 million | Unknown | |
| 37P | May 28 – 30 | Tropical depression | 65 km/h (40 mph) | 997 hPa (29.44 inHg) | Vanuatu | None | None | |
| Keli | June 7 – 17 | Category 3 severe tropical cyclone | 150 km/h (90 mph) | 955 hPa (28.20 inHg) | Tuvalu, Fiji, Samoan Islands, Niue | $10,000 | None | |
Season aggregates
| 14 systems | November 19, 1996 – June 17, 1997 | | 185 km/h (115 mph) | 925 hPa (27.32 inHg) | | $129 million | 26 | |

== See also ==
- List of Southern Hemisphere tropical cyclone seasons
- Atlantic hurricane seasons: 1996, 1997
- Pacific hurricane seasons: 1996, 1997
- Pacific typhoon seasons: 1996, 1997
- North Indian Ocean cyclone seasons: 1996, 1997
