= Tropical Storm Greg (1996) =

Pacific tropical depression in 1996

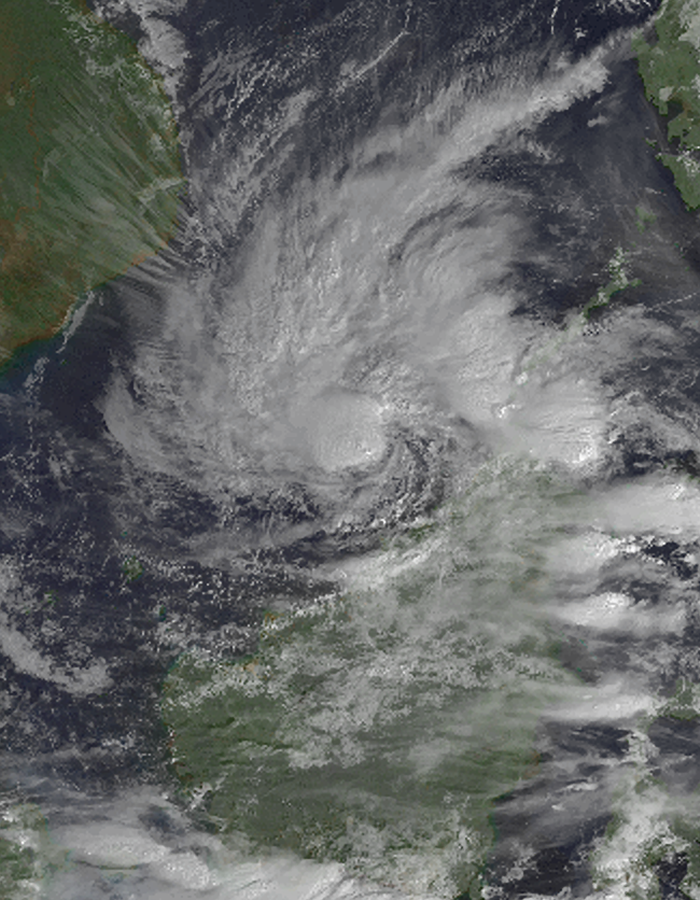
- Greg at peak intensity near the island of Borneo on December 25

Meteorological history
- Formed: December 24, 1996
- Remnant low: December 26, 1996
- Dissipated: December 27, 1996

Tropical storm
- 1-minute sustained (SSHWS/JTWC)
- Highest winds: 85 km/h (50 mph)
- Lowest pressure: 1002 hPa (mbar); 29.59 inHg

Overall effects
- Fatalities: 238 total
- Missing: 102
- Damage: $280 million (1996 USD)
- Areas affected: Malaysia, Philippines, North Sulawesi
- IBTrACS
- Part of the 1996 Pacific typhoon season

Tropical Storm Greg was a Pacific tropical cyclone that formed at an unusually low latitude in the South China Sea, and became the worst tropical cyclone to affect Malaysia since reliable records began. The last storm of the 1996 Pacific typhoon season, Greg formed on December 24 on the same two monsoon troughs that also spawned Tropical Storm Fern in the basin and cyclones Ophelia, Phil and Fergus in the Southern Hemisphere. The storm headed an east-southeastward track and despite an unfavorable environment for intensification, Greg strengthened to a tropical storm on Christmas Day. It then reached its peak intensity shortly, with maximum sustained winds of 85 km/h (55 mph) and a minimum barometric pressure of 1002 hPa before making landfall along the northern portion of the Malaysian state of Sabah between 1700 and 1800 UTC (3:00 - 4:00 am MYT) on December 26. After crossing the state, it weakened to a tropical depression before passing through Tawi-Tawi in the Philippines on the next day. Wind shear further degraded the system until it dissipated on December 27 on the Celebes Sea, south of Mindanao.

Greg was one of only three systems to made landfall in Malaysia, before Vamei in 2001 did so, nearly five years later, and Senyar in 2025 before crossing Western Pacific. The storm brought extensive and catastrophic damages across Sabah, causing over $280 million in damage (1996 USD) and 238 deaths, which mainly are foreigners and tourists. Another 102 individuals were also rendered missing. Flash floods and widespread mudslides were also recorded throughout the state, destroying houses and overflowing rivers, respectively.

Following the massive aftermath of the storm, the state government of Sabah immediately started to rehabilitate the areas that sustained damages, and relief operations were speeded. The government also allocated over $2 million for the operation process, while a relief fund collected $1 million for the affected evacuees. Mass graves were also started for the unidentifiable victims of the storm. Some authorities described Greg as one of the worst disasters in the history of Malaysia.

== Meteorological history ==
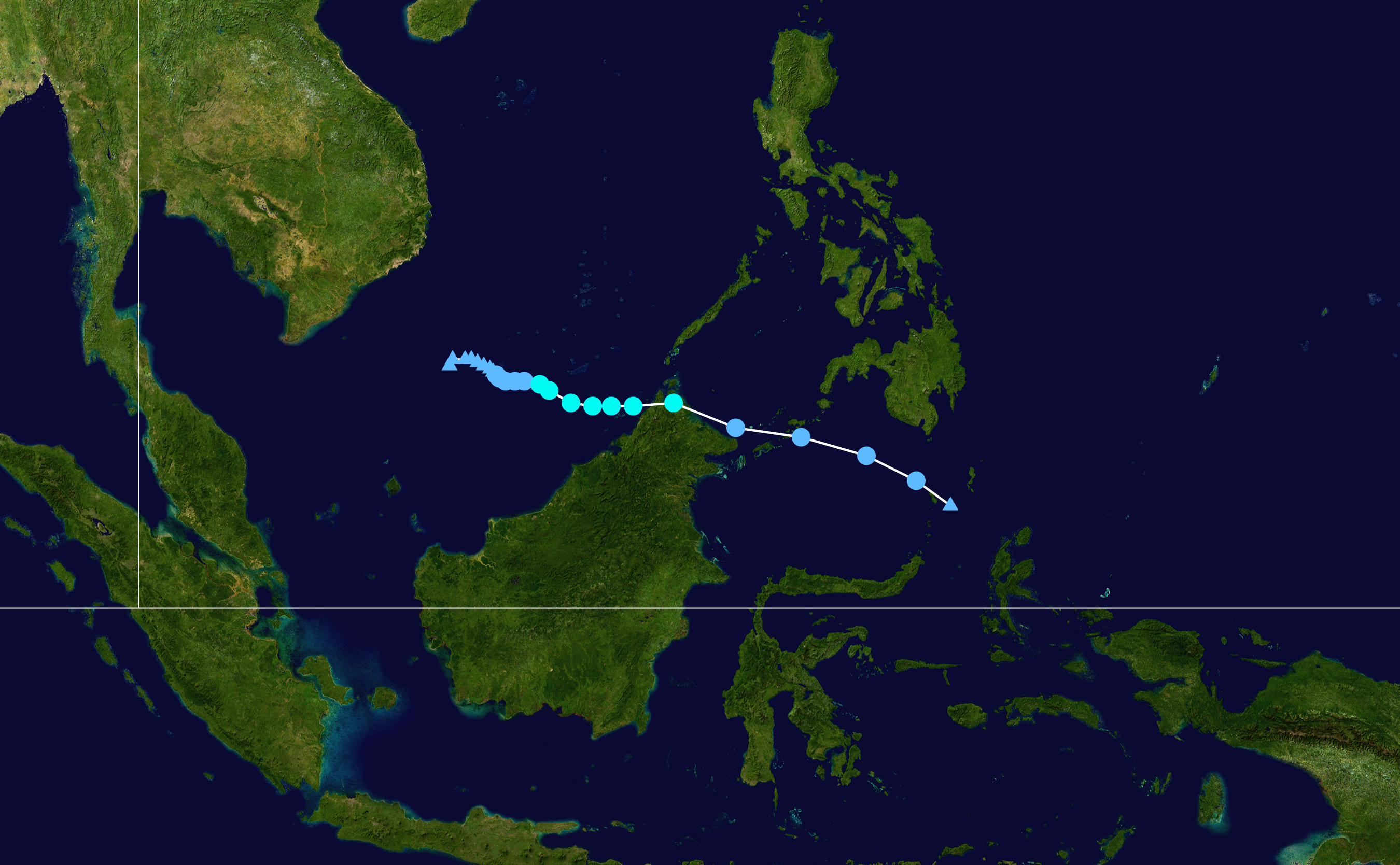
Map plotting the storm's track and intensity, according to the Saffir–Simpson scale Map key Saffir–Simpson scale Tropical depression (≤38 mph, ≤62 km/h) Tropical storm (39–73 mph, 63–118 km/h) Category 1 (74–95 mph, 119–153 km/h) Category 2 (96–110 mph, 154–177 km/h) Category 3 (111–129 mph, 178–208 km/h) Category 4 (130–156 mph, 209–251 km/h) Category 5 (≥157 mph, ≥252 km/h) Unknown Storm type Tropical cyclone Subtropical cyclone Extratropical cyclone, remnant low, tropical disturbance, or monsoon depression

In the middle of December, two low-latitude monsoon troughs were located in the extreme western Pacific Ocean, well associated with a strong westerly wind burst that would spawn the system that would be Tropical Storm Fern and itself in the Northern Hemisphere. The second trough which was located in the Southern Hemisphere, will also generate cloudiness in the Australian region that would also spawn three systems in the basin: namely Ophelia, Phil and Fergus. A persistent area of convection was first mentioned by the JTWC on December 21 at 2100 UTC in their Significant Tropical Weather Advisory over the low latitudes of the South China Sea, well west of Brunei. Two days later, the organization of the system became well-defined, as stated in their advisories on December 23 and in reports by weather stations in East Malaysia. In addition, the system's convection improved within the next 24 hours due to the active wind burst. At 04:00 UTC, the JTWC issued a Tropical Cyclone Formation Alert on the system, depicting a rapid convective organization being detected in the microwave and visible satellite images. Upper-level divergence on the system also began to be seen in water-vapor imagery, also a sign of tropical cyclogenesis. This was followed by the first warning by the agency on the system as Tropical Depression 43W, roughly two hours later. Despite wind shear starting to impact the developing system, the depression intensified to a tropical storm on December 25 at 0000 UTC and was named Greg. In post-tropical analysis, Greg may have likely intensified with gale-force winds, six hours later. Combined effects of wind shear and the prevailing northeast monsoon made Greg slowly intensify while taking a southeastward track, before turning to the east, approaching northwestern Sabah, a state of Malaysia. The forward motion of Greg also increased, before reaching its peak intensity of 85 km/h (55 mph) and a minimum barometric pressure reading of 1002 hPa (29.59 inHg) that time. It held this intensity until it made landfall along the town of Kudat between 1700 and 1800 UTC that day (03:00 and 04:00 am the next day, MYT) before hitting the major city of Sandakan, also that time. These landfalls weakened Greg to a tropical depression as it entered Sulu Sea before passing through Tawi-Tawi on December 26. It then entered the Celebes Sea on the afternoon of the same day before degenerating to a remnant low, shortly after as it encountered an unfavorable environment, namely colder sea surface temperatures. At 0600 UTC on December 27, the JTWC issued their final warning on the system as it dissipated to the south of Mindanao, ending the very active 1996 Pacific typhoon season.

The Joint Typhoon Warning Center tracked and named the system; however, the Japan Meteorological Agency did not included Greg in their annual best track.

=== Unusual formation ===
Tropical cyclones making landfall in Malaysia are extremely rare. Only Greg, Vamei of 2001, and Senyar of 2025 had only significant effects in the country, since reliable records began.

The east-southeastward movement of Greg is also unusual. Any tropical cyclone that forms and moves through the South China Sea will typically progress through the Indochina, became quasi-stationary, or move southwestward and dissipate immediately. This is due to the well-established northeasterly wind flow from the Northern Hemisphere. As Greg's predecessor formed in the waters near Vietnam, an unusually large wind pattern started to dominate the area where the system is and two low-level westerly winds existed from the north and south of the equator: namely the Northern and Southern Hemispheres. With these factors blocking the northeast monsoon to the east, the strong pattern of winds from the south helped Greg to take an eastward track. Adding on, the large circulation of developing Fern to its northeast were hypothesized as another reason for the system's east-southeastward motion as it started to dissipate.

== Preparations ==
Hours prior to Greg moving ashore, the Malaysian Meteorological Department (MetMalaysia) issued subsequent warnings of heavy rainfall and strong winds to the territory of Labuan and western Sabah, all in Malaysia. Some fishermen were also advised to stay away from rough seas caused by the storm. Over 5,600 individuals were evacuated due to the storm; however, some persons decided to stay in their houses.

== Impact ==
Statistics of affected areas by Greg
Place	Affected individuals	Affected residences	Reported deaths
Kota Kinabalu	8,730	4,717	4
Tuaran	8,136	1,697	5
Papar	772	45	2
Penampang	324	40	–
Keningau	5,040	500	227
Sipitang	131	25	–
Tenom	3,500	26	–
Telupid	7	–	–
Beaufort	12,867	–	–
Jumlah	39,687	7,280	238

The effects of Greg in Sabah were catastrophic. Its state government sustained damages, worth RM 130 million ($31,574, 2021 USD). Many buildings and infrastructures were either destroyed or sustained damages. Trees and electricity poles were downed due to the strong winds, while many roads were flooded. Over 25,000 individuals were left homeless, mainly due to landslides and floods that washed away their houses. Billboards and debris were also scattered throughout the roadways. Total deaths from Greg were counted to be 238, while 102 more persons were rendered missing. The impacts of Greg were separated by divisions, as follows:

=== West Coast Division ===
==== Kota Kinabalu ====
In the capital of Sabah, some residents reported that the roofs of hundreds of houses were torn and some trees were downed due to high winds. Billboard scraps and garbages were also scattered and dispersed throughout the roads. 8,730 individuals were required to be evacuated, while 4 deaths were recorded in the city. 4,717 houses were either destroyed or washed out. One of the floodlights of the Likas Stadium collapsed through a major road, making vehicles stranded. In addition, the roof of the said stadium were blown away by the strong winds from Greg.

The Sabah Foundation Building was required to close due to the serious damage to the area. The rooms of the Chief Minister's Department sustained heavy damages to equipment as they were flooded. The said damage was possibly caused by a shattered glass roof falling from an estimated distance of eight meters. However, no injuries were reported on the building.

Some primary and secondary schools are also affected by the floods. These are the SK Pulau Sepangar, SK Gentiasan, SK Kebagu Menggatal, SK Rampayan Menggatal, SK Tobobon Menggatal, SK Karambunai Telipok, SK Melawa Telipok, SK Lapasan Telipok, SMK Menggatal, SMK Pulau Gaya, SMK Inanam, SMK Agama Inanam, SMK Likas, and SMK Perempuan Likas. Another newly built school, namely the Sekolah Kebangsaan Darau, sustained a roof damage.

==== Tuaran District ====
In the district, 35 villages reported serious damages due to the floods. In addition, the road that connects to the area and the state's capital were disrupted because of downed trees that blocked the thoroughfare. The trees also cut the power supply through the populated district, affecting an unknown number of residents. The clean water supply also became a problem due to the broken water pipes that connects the district from the main water supply, at the capital Kota Kinabalu. Fifteen primary schools reported damages due to the storm, as well churches, resort houses, and major hotels. In the small town of Tamparuli, six schools reported damages; these are the SK Saradan, SK Pekan Tamparuli, SK Rungus, SK Lingga Baru, SK Guakon and SMK Pekan Tamparuli.

At total of 8,136 individuals were affected, 1,697 houses were flooded and/or destroyed, and 5 people died in the district.

==== Kampung Tanjung Aru ====
The weather station of the area was reported to be heavily damaged by Greg. Some fishing boats were either destroyed or stranded while the others sunk through the rough seas caused by the storm. No deaths were reported in the area.

== Aftermath ==
Greg was the last storm of 1996

== See also ==
- Tropical Storm Vamei
- Tropical Depression Pabling (2001) – another low-latitude storm that also moved in an eastward direction.
