= 52nd meridian =

52nd meridian may refer to:

- 52nd meridian east, a line of longitude east of the Greenwich Meridian
- 52nd meridian west, a line of longitude west of the Greenwich Meridian

52nd meridian west	52nd meridian east
