= 128th meridian =

128th meridian may refer to:

- 128th meridian east, a line of longitude east of the Greenwich Meridian
- 128th meridian west, a line of longitude west of the Greenwich Meridian

128th meridian west	128th meridian east
