= 55th meridian =

55th meridian may refer to:

- 55th meridian east, a line of longitude east of the Greenwich Meridian
- 55th meridian west, a line of longitude west of the Greenwich Meridian

55th meridian west	55th meridian east
