= 51st meridian =

51st meridian may refer to:

- 51st meridian east, a line of longitude east of the Greenwich Meridian
- 51st meridian west, a line of longitude west of the Greenwich Meridian

51st meridian west	51st meridian east
