= 126th meridian =

126th meridian may refer to:

- 126th meridian east, a line of longitude east of the Greenwich Meridian
- 126th meridian west, a line of longitude west of the Greenwich Meridian

126th meridian west	126th meridian east
