= 127th meridian east =

Line of longitude

127th meridian east (interactive map)

The meridian 127° east of Greenwich is a line of longitude that extends from the North Pole across the Arctic Ocean, Asia, Australia, the Indian Ocean, the Southern Ocean, and Antarctica to the South Pole.

The 127th meridian east forms a great circle with the 53rd meridian west.

World Map in outline centred on East Asia and Australia.

== From Pole to Pole ==
Starting at the North Pole and heading south to the South Pole, the 127th meridian east passes through:

Co-ordinates	Country, territory or sea	Notes
90°0′N 127°0′E	Arctic Ocean	
77°34′N 127°0′E	Laptev Sea	
73°27′N 127°0′E	Russia	Sakha Republic — islands of the Lena Delta and the mainland Amur Oblast — from 55°42′N 127°0′E
51°0′N 127°0′E	China	Heilongjiang; Jilin — from 45°0′N 127°0′E; Heilongjiang — for about 10 km from 44°47′N 127°0′E; Jilin — from 44°43′N 127°0′E
41°45′N 127°0′E	North Korea	Jagang Province; Yanggang Province; South Hamgyeong Province; South Pyeongan Province; South Hamgyeong Province; Gangwon Province
38°13′N 127°0′E	South Korea	Gyeonggi Province; Passing through Seoul; Gyeonggi Province - Passing through of Suwon; South Chungcheong Province; North Jeolla Province - Passing just west of Jeonju; South Jeolla Province; Passing just east of Gwangju; South Jeolla Province
34°18′N 127°0′E	East China Sea	Passing just east of the island of Jeju-do, South Korea (at 33°27′N 126°57′E); Passing just west of the island of Tonakijima, Okinawa Prefecture, Japan (at 26°22′N 127°8′E); Passing just east of the island of Kumejima, Okinawa Prefecture, Japan (at 26°20′N 126°49′E)
25°45′N 127°0′E	Pacific Ocean	Philippine Sea — passing just east of the Talaud Islands, Indonesia (at 4°16′N 126°55′E)
4°17′N 127°0′E	Molucca Sea	Passing just west of the island of Latalata, Indonesia (at 0°16′S 127°1′E); Passing just west of the island of Kasiruta, Indonesia (at 0°26′S 127°5′E)
1°43′S 127°0′E	Ceram Sea	
3°9′S 127°0′E	Indonesia	Island of Buru
3°43′S 127°0′E	Banda Sea	Passing just east of the island of Wetar, Indonesia (at 7°43′S 126°50′E); Passing just west of the island of Kisar, Indonesia (at 8°2′S 127°8′E)
8°20′S 127°0′E	Timor-Leste	
8°41′S 127°0′E	Timor Sea	
13°46′S 127°0′E	Australia	Western Australia
32°18′S 127°0′E	Indian Ocean	Australian authorities consider this to be part of the Southern Ocean
60°0′S 127°0′E	Southern Ocean	
66°31′S 127°0′E	Antarctica	Australian Antarctic Territory, claimed by Australia

== See also ==
- 126th meridian east
- 128th meridian east
