= 54th meridian west =

Line of longitude

54th meridian west

The meridian 54° west of Greenwich is a line of longitude that extends from the North Pole across the Arctic Ocean, Greenland, Newfoundland, the Atlantic Ocean, South America, the Southern Ocean, and Antarctica to the South Pole.

The 54th meridian west forms a great circle with the 126th meridian east.

== From Pole to Pole ==
Starting at the North Pole and heading south to the South Pole, the 54th meridian west passes through:

Co-ordinates	Country, territory or sea	Notes
90°0′N 54°0′W	Arctic Ocean	
83°37′N 54°0′W	Lincoln Sea	
82°16′N 54°0′W	Greenland	Nyeboe Land
71°26′N 54°0′W	Baffin Bay	Passing just west of Illorsuit Island, Greenland (at 71°8′N 54°0′W)
70°49′N 54°0′W	Greenland	Nuussuaq Peninsula
70°24′N 54°0′W	Sullorsuaq Strait	
70°17′N 54°0′W	Greenland	Disko Island
69°34′N 54°0′W	Davis Strait	Passing just west of the mainland of Greenland (at 67°5′N 54°0′W)
60°0′N 54°0′W	Atlantic Ocean	Labrador Sea; An unnamed part of the Ocean — passing just east of Fogo Island, Newfoundland and Labrador, Canada (at 49°39′N 54°0′W)
49°27′N 54°0′W	Canada	Newfoundland and Labrador — island of Newfoundland
47°45′N 54°0′W	Placentia Bay	
47°19′N 54°0′W	Canada	Newfoundland and Labrador — Avalon Peninsula on the island of Newfoundland
46°50′N 54°0′W	Atlantic Ocean	
5°46′N 54°0′W	Suriname	For about 10 km at the extreme north-east of the country
5°40′N 54°0′W	France	French Guiana
3°39′N 54°0′W	Suriname	For about 13 km
3°33′N 54°0′W	France	French Guiana — passing through some territory claimed by Suriname
2°13′N 54°0′W	Brazil	Amapá; Pará — from 1°32′N 54°0′W; Mato Grosso — from 9°37′S 54°0′W; Mato Grosso do Sul — from 17°29′S 54°0′W; Paraná — from 23°29′N 54°0′W
25°34′S 54°0′W	Argentina	
27°12′S 54°0′W	Brazil	Rio Grande do Sul
31°55′S 54°0′W	Uruguay	
34°31′S 54°0′W	Atlantic Ocean	
60°0′S 54°0′W	Southern Ocean	
61°5′S 54°0′W	South Shetland Islands	Clarence Island — claimed by Argentina, Chile and United Kingdom
61°14′S 54°0′W	Southern Ocean	
76°39′S 54°0′W	Antarctica	Territory claimed by Argentina, Chile and United Kingdom

== See also ==
- 53rd meridian west
- 55th meridian west
