= Tropical Storm Fern =

Pacific severe tropical storm in 1996

Severe Tropical Storm Fern
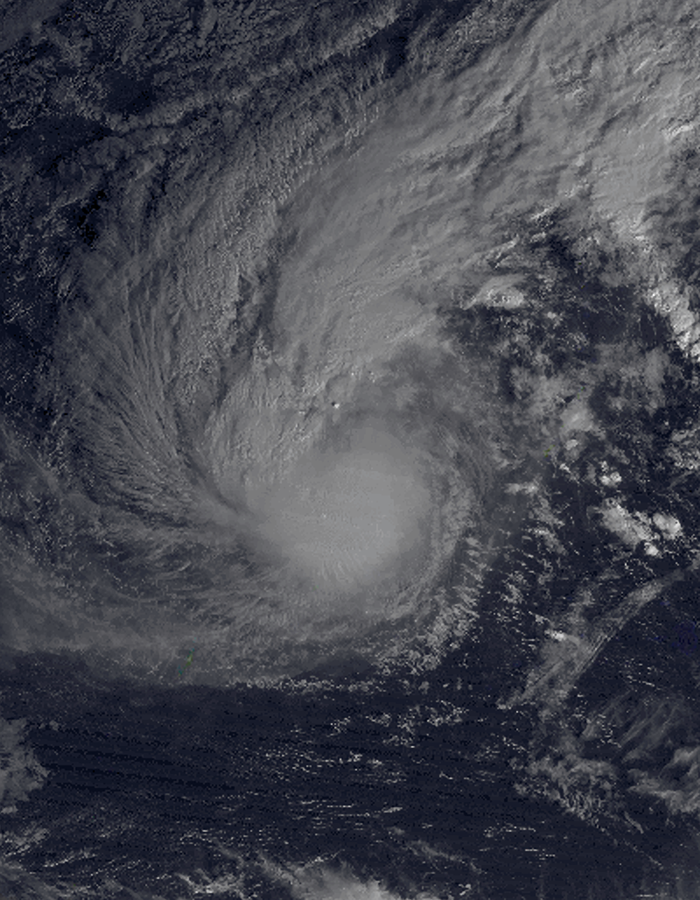
- Fern at peak intensity late on December 26, 1996

Meteorological history
- Formed: December 21, 1996
- Extratropical: December 30, 1996
- Dissipated: December 31, 1996

Severe tropical storm
- 10-minute sustained (JMA)
- Highest winds: 110 km/h (70 mph)
- Lowest pressure: 975 hPa (mbar); 28.79 inHg

Category 1-equivalent typhoon
- 1-minute sustained (SSHWS/JTWC)
- Highest winds: 150 km/h (90 mph)

Overall effects
- Fatalities: None
- Damage: $3 million (1996 USD)
- Areas affected: Yap
- IBTrACS
- Part of the 1996 Pacific typhoon season

Severe Tropical Storm Fern was a damaging storm that struck Yap in the 1996 Pacific typhoon season. A tropical depression formed on December 21, when a low-level circulation center began to produce deep convection. The depression strengthened into a tropical storm the next day, and was given the name Fern by the Joint Typhoon Warning Center (JTWC). The storm slowly intensified into a Category 1 typhoon on the Saffir–Simpson hurricane wind scale, according to JTWC. Fern peaked north of Yap on December 26, with JTWC assessing winds of 150 km/h (90 mph), while the Regional Specialized Meteorological Center, Japan Meteorological Agency (JMA) assessed peak winds of 110 km/h (70 mph), just below typhoon strength. The storm soon became sheared and weakened slowly. Fern continued to weaken to a tropical depression on December 30. Both agencies stopped advisories later on the same day.

Fern made a direct hit at Yap on Christmas Day. A cargo ship was abandoned after it was damaged by high winds offshore. On the island, Fern caused $3 million (1996 USD) of damage. Roads and bridges were significantly damaged, and other public facilities were destroyed. Crops and private properties also received damage. A state of emergency was declared in Yap State two weeks later, and became a disaster area two months later.

== Meteorological history ==
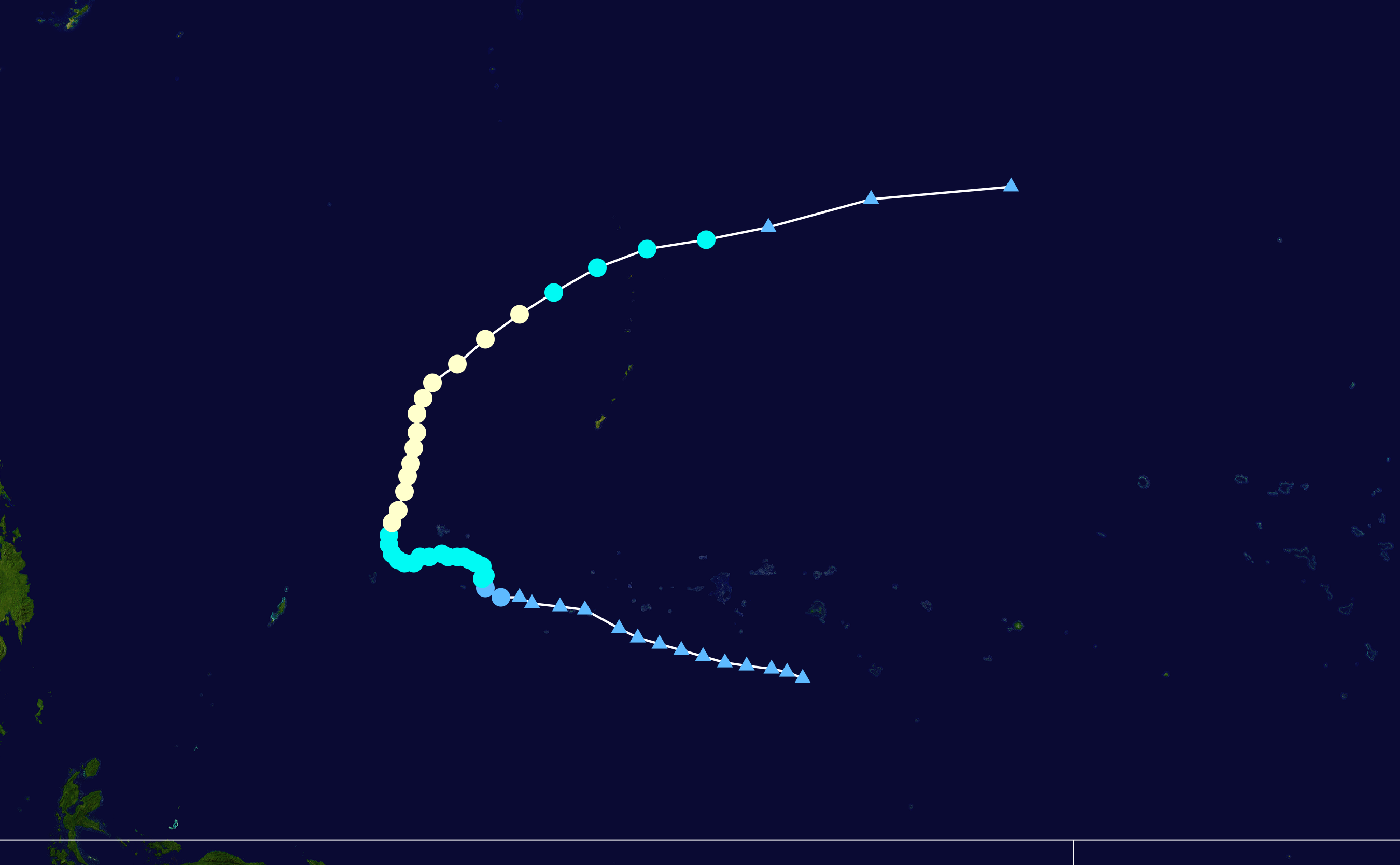
Map plotting the storm's track and intensity, according to the Saffir–Simpson scale Map key Saffir–Simpson scale Tropical depression (≤38 mph, ≤62 km/h) Tropical storm (39–73 mph, 63–118 km/h) Category 1 (74–95 mph, 119–153 km/h) Category 2 (96–110 mph, 154–177 km/h) Category 3 (111–129 mph, 178–208 km/h) Category 4 (130–156 mph, 209–251 km/h) Category 5 (≥157 mph, ≥252 km/h) Unknown Storm type Tropical cyclone Subtropical cyclone Extratropical cyclone, remnant low, tropical disturbance, or monsoon depression

In the middle of December, twin monsoon troughs were established in the extreme western Pacific Ocean, which will later spawn storms Greg, and Fern itself in the northern hemisphere. The trough in the southern hemisphere spawned cyclones Ophelia, Phil, and Fergus. Around that time, convection began to increase near the equator, and was associated with a westerly wind burst. A low level circulation center was noted by JTWC on December 19 at 0600 UTC. Two days later, convection consolidated near the circulation center, and JMA began tracking it at 0000 UTC as a tropical depression. (Note: The Japan Meteorological Agency is the official Regional Specialized Meteorological Center for the western Pacific Ocean.) JTWC issued a Tropical Cyclone Formation Alert at 1500 UTC, as sea level pressure began to deepen, and signs of upper level divergence were found in the system. The first advisory for Tropical Depression 42W followed three hours later, on December 17 at 1200 UTC. JTWC upgraded the depression to a tropical storm on December 22 at 0000 UTC as it traveled westerly, and was given the name Fern. According to JTWC, the wind speeds meandered at minimal tropical storm strength. JMA proceeded to upgrade the depression into a tropical storm at 1800 UTC, with winds of 65 km/h (40 mph), and a pressure reading of 996 hectopascals (996 mbar). (Note: Wind estimates from the JMA and most other basins throughout the world are sustained over 10 minutes, while estimates from the United States-based Joint Typhoon Warning Center are sustained over 1 minute. 10 minute winds are about 1.14 times the amount of 1 minute winds.) On Christmas Eve, Fern slowly traveled toward Yap. The storm passed over Yap the next day, strengthening to 105 km/h (65 mph) at 0000 UTC, according to JTWC. JMA assessed Fern had winds of 100 km/h (60 mph) at the same time. Fern also began its recurvature that day, beginning its turn north.

Eighteen hours later on Christmas Day, JTWC upgraded Fern to a typhoon, with winds of 120 km/h (75 mph). JMA continued to keep it as a severe tropical storm at that time. On December 26 at 1200 UTC, Fern reached its peak at 150 km/h (90 mph) north of Yap after its recurvature, according to JTWC. JMA assessed that Fern reached its peak of 110 km/h (70 mph), with a pressure reading of 975 hPa (975 mb) twelve hours later. On December 28, Fern began to weaken when it encountered a shear line. On the next day, JTWC downgraded Fern back to tropical storm strength, with winds of 110 km/h (70 mph). At the same time according to JMA, the storm had weakened to 80 km/h (50 mph), with a pressure reading of 985 hPa (985 mbar). Both warning centers downgraded Fern into a tropical depression by December 30, as it continued to travel along a shear line. JTWC issued the final warning at 0600 UTC, while JMA stopped tracking the depression at 1200 UTC. JTWC continued to track the low until December 31, where it stalled north of Guam.

== Impact and aftermath ==
At sea, a cargo ship en route from Guam to Yap was abandoned after it was damaged by high winds. The passengers entered a life raft, and were later found by a Navy search and rescue airplane. They were soon rescued by a Maltese tanker. No one was injured when the accident occurred.

Yap was directly hit by Fern on Christmas Day, causing about $3 million (1996 USD) of damage. The Weather Service Office received a peak wind gust of 116 km/h (72 mph), and a pressure reading of 983 hPa (983 mbar). The island received gusts around 93 km/h (58 mph) for several hours. One person was injured on the island, and no deaths were attributed to the storm. Roads and bridges were severely damaged, accounting for half of the damage. Homes and other private properties were also significantly damaged. Most crops on the island, such as coconuts, bananas, papayas, and breadfruit, were destroyed by the storm. Public facilities, like schools and hospitals, suffered widespread destruction.

On January 3, 1997, a state of emergency was declared for Yap by Acting President Jacob Nena, stating that Fern caused "an imminent threat to health, safety and welfare of the people of the affected areas." Two months later, on March 20, United States President Bill Clinton declared Yap State a disaster area, allowing the Federal Emergency Management Agency (FEMA) to start the damage assessment of the area. The FEMA funding was only for public facilities, and did not include private properties. The request for individual assistance was not approved by FEMA, as damage to private properties were not much, and assistance from the national government and Yap State were sufficient.
