= 53rd meridian west =

Line of longitude

53rd meridian west (interactive map)

The meridian 53° west of Greenwich is a line of longitude that extends from the North Pole across the Arctic Ocean, Greenland, Newfoundland, the Atlantic Ocean, South America, the Southern Ocean, and Antarctica to the South Pole.

In Antarctica, the meridian defines the eastern limit of Chile's territorial claim and passes through the British and Argentinian claims - the three claims overlap. It also defines the western limit of Brazil's unofficial claim.

The 53rd meridian west forms a great circle with the 127th meridian east.

== From Pole to Pole ==
Starting at the North Pole and heading south to the South Pole, the 53rd meridian west passes through:

Co-ordinates	Country, territory or sea	Notes
90°0′N 53°0′W	Arctic Ocean	
83°38′N 53°0′W	Lincoln Sea	
82°19′N 53°0′W	Greenland	Hendrik Island
82°5′N 53°0′W	Saint George Fjord	
81°49′N 53°0′W	Greenland	The mainland, and the islands of Qeqertarsuaq and Upernivik
71°9′N 53°0′W	Uummannaq Fjord	
70°46′N 53°0′W	Greenland	Nuussuaq Peninsula
70°18′N 53°0′W	Sullorsuaq Strait	
70°5′N 53°0′W	Greenland	Disko Island
69°20′N 53°0′W	Disko Bay	
68°40′N 53°0′W	Greenland	Passing through the mainland and many islands on the coast, including Saqqarliup Nunaa, Aamat, Sermersut and Maniitsoq
65°26′N 53°0′W	Atlantic Ocean	Passing just east of the Bonavista Peninsula, Newfoundland and Labrador, Canada (at 48°35′N 53°0′W)
48°7′N 53°0′W	Canada	Newfoundland and Labrador — Bay de Verde Peninsula on the island of Newfoundland
47°59′N 53°0′W	Conception Bay	
47°38′N 53°0′W	Canada	Newfoundland and Labrador — Bell Island
47°36′N 53°0′W	Conception Bay	
47°31′N 53°0′W	Canada	Newfoundland and Labrador — Avalon Peninsula on the island of Newfoundland
46°45′N 53°0′W	Atlantic Ocean	
5°28′N 53°0′W	French Guiana	Overseas Territories
2°10′N 53°0′W	Brazil	Amapá; Pará — from 0°2′N 53°0′W; Mato Grosso — from 9°41′S 53°0′W; Goiás — from 16°51′S 53°0′W; Mato Grosso do Sul — from 18°19′S 53°0′W; São Paulo — for about 10 km from 22°30′S 53°0′W; Paraná — from 22°35′S 53°0′W; Santa Catarina — from 26°21′S 53°0′W; Rio Grande do Sul— from 27°8′S 53°0′W
33°28′S 53°0′W	Atlantic Ocean	
60°0′S 53°0′W	Southern Ocean	
76°49′S 53°0′W	Antarctica	Territory claimed by both Argentina (Argentine Antarctica) and United Kingdom (British Antarctic Territory); the western limit of the proposed Brazilian Antarctica, claimed by Brazil; and the eastern limit of Antártica Chilena Province, claimed by Chile

== See also ==
- 52nd meridian west
- 54th meridian west
