= 51st meridian west =

Line of longitude

51st meridian west

The meridian 51° west of Greenwich is a line of longitude that extends from the North Pole across the Arctic Ocean, Greenland, the Atlantic Ocean, South America, the Southern Ocean, and Antarctica to the South Pole.

The 51st meridian west forms a great circle with the 129th meridian east.

== From Pole to Pole ==
Starting at the North Pole and heading south to the South Pole, the 51st meridian west passes through:

Co-ordinates	Country, territory or sea	Notes
90°0′N 51°0′W	Arctic Ocean	
83°39′N 51°0′W	Lincoln Sea	
82°31′N 51°0′W	Greenland	Wulff Land
82°24′N 51°0′W	Sherard Osborn Fjord	
81°57′N 51°0′W	Greenland	Passing through several fjords, the Nuussuaq Peninsula and Alluttoq Island
69°32′N 51°0′W	Disko Bay	
69°20′N 51°0′W	Greenland	Passing through several fjords
63°8′N 51°0′W	Atlantic Ocean	
3°6′N 51°0′W	Brazil	Amapá; Pará — from 0°0′N 51°0′W, passing through several islands in the mouth of the Amazon River; Mato Grosso — from 9°48′S 51°0′W; Goiás — from 14°37′S 51°0′W; Mato Grosso do Sul — from 19°24′S 51°0′W; Minas Gerais — from 19°38′S 51°0′W; São Paulo — from 20°5′S 51°0′W; Paraná — from 22°47′S 51°0′W; Santa Catarina — from 26°14′S 51°0′W; Rio Grande do Sul — from 27°58′S 51°0′W, passing through Lagoa dos Patos
31°20′S 51°0′W	Atlantic Ocean	
60°0′S 51°0′W	Southern Ocean	
77°1′S 51°0′W	Antarctica	Claimed by both Argentina (Argentine Antarctica) and United Kingdom (British Antarctic Territory)

== See also ==
- 50th meridian west
- 52nd meridian west
