= 55th meridian west =

Line of longitude

55th meridian west

The meridian 55° west of Greenwich is a line of longitude that extends from the North Pole across the Arctic Ocean, North America, the Atlantic Ocean, South America, the Southern Ocean, and Antarctica to the South Pole.

The 55th meridian west forms a great circle with the 125th meridian east.

== From Pole to Pole ==
Starting at the North Pole and heading south to the South Pole, the 55th meridian west passes through:

Co-ordinates	Country, territory or sea	Notes
90°0′N 55°0′W	Arctic Ocean	
83°36′N 55°0′W	Lincoln Sea	
82°20′N 55°0′W	Greenland	Nyeboe Land
71°26′N 55°0′W	Baffin Bay	
70°29′N 55°0′W	Greenland	Qeqertarsuatsiaq Island
70°24′N 55°0′W	Baffin Bay	
70°0′N 55°0′W	Davis Strait	Passing just west of Disko Island, Greenland (at 69°42′N 54°59′W)
60°0′N 55°0′W	Atlantic Ocean	Labrador Sea; An unnamed part of the Ocean; Notre Dame Bay
49°33′N 55°0′W	Canada	Newfoundland and Labrador — the Exploits Islands and the island of Newfoundland
47°25′N 55°0′W	Fortune Bay	
47°30′N 55°0′W	Canada	Newfoundland and Labrador — Burin Peninsula on the island of Newfoundland
47°17′N 55°0′W	Atlantic Ocean	
6°0′N 55°0′W	Suriname	Passing just east of Paramaribo
2°35′N 55°0′W	Brazil	Pará; Mato Grosso — from 9°33′S 55°0′W; Mato Grosso do Sul — from 17°38′S 55°0′W
23°57′S 55°0′W	Paraguay	
26°47′S 55°0′W	Argentina	
27°47′S 55°0′W	Brazil	Rio Grande do Sul
31°18′S 55°0′W	Uruguay	
34°55′S 55°0′W	Atlantic Ocean	
60°0′S 55°0′W	Southern Ocean	
61°2′S 55°0′W	South Shetland Islands	Elephant Island — claimed by Argentina, Chile and United Kingdom
61°8′S 55°0′W	Southern Ocean	Passing just east of Joinville Island, Antarctica (at 63°18′S 55°1′W)
76°30′S 55°0′W	Antarctica	Territory claimed by Argentina, Chile and United Kingdom

== See also ==
- 54th meridian west
- 56th meridian west
