= 125th meridian east =

Line of longitude

125th meridian east (interactive map)

The meridian 125° east of Greenwich is a line of longitude that extends from the North Pole across the Arctic Ocean, Asia, Australia, the Indian Ocean, the Southern Ocean, and Antarctica to the South Pole.

The 125th meridian east forms a great circle with the 55th meridian west.

== From Pole to Pole ==
Starting at the North Pole and heading south to the South Pole, the 125th meridian east passes through:

Co-ordinates	Country, territory or sea	Notes
90°0′N 125°0′E	Arctic Ocean	
77°48′N 125°0′E	Laptev Sea	
73°40′N 125°0′E	Russia	Sakha Republic — islands of the Lena Delta and the mainland Amur Oblast — from 55°52′N 125°0′E
53°12′N 125°0′E	China	Heilongjiang; Inner Mongolia — from 51°32′N 125°0′E; Heilongjiang — from 49°11′N 125°0′E; Jilin — from 45°29′N 125°0′E; Liaoning — from 42°35′N 125°0′E
40°28′N 125°0′E	North Korea	
39°38′N 125°0′E	Yellow Sea	Korea Bay
38°39′N 125°0′E	North Korea	Island of Sok-do and the mainland
38°4′N 125°0′E	Yellow Sea	
37°57′N 125°0′E	North Korea	
37°55′N 125°0′E	Yellow Sea	
37°49′N 125°0′E	North Korea	Island of Kirin-do
37°47′N 125°0′E	Yellow Sea	Passing just west of the island of Gageodo, South Korea (at 34°4′N 125°5′E)
33°17′N 125°0′E	East China Sea	Passing just west of the island of Shimojishima, Japan (at 24°49′N 125°8′E); Passing just east of the island of Taramajima, Japan (at 24°39′N 124°43′E)
24°40′N 125°0′E	Pacific Ocean	Philippine Sea
12°40′N 125°0′E	Philippines	Islands of Samar and Leyte
10°23′N 125°0′E	Sogod Bay	
10°10′N 125°0′E	Philippines	Island of Leyte
10°2′N 125°0′E	Bohol Sea	
8°56′N 125°0′E	Philippines	Island of Mindanao
5°52′N 125°0′E	Celebes Sea	
1°45′N 125°0′E	Indonesia	Island of Sulawesi
1°7′N 125°0′E	Molucca Sea	
1°44′S 125°0′E	Indonesia	Island of Taliabu
1°57′S 125°0′E	Banda Sea	
8°10′S 125°0′E	Indonesia	Island of Alor
8°21′S 125°0′E	Savu Sea	
8°54′S 125°0′E	Timor-Leste	Island of Timor
9°2′S 125°0′E	Indonesia	Island of Timor
9°12′S 125°0′E	Timor-Leste	Island of Timor
9°17′S 125°0′E	Indonesia	Island of Timor
9°32′S 125°0′E	Timor Sea	
12°26′S 125°0′E	Indian Ocean	
15°6′S 125°0′E	Australia	Western Australia — the Maret Islands and the mainland
32°46′S 125°0′E	Indian Ocean	Australian authorities consider this to be part of the Southern Ocean
60°0′S 125°0′E	Southern Ocean	
66°17′S 125°0′E	Antarctica	Australian Antarctic Territory, claimed by Australia

== See also ==
- 124th meridian east
- 126th meridian east
