= 52nd meridian west =

Line of longitude

52nd meridian west

The meridian 52° west of Greenwich is a line of longitude that extends from the North Pole across the Arctic Ocean, Greenland, the Atlantic Ocean, South America, the Southern Ocean, and Antarctica to the South Pole.

The 52nd meridian west forms a great circle with the 128th meridian east.

== From Pole to Pole ==
Starting at the North Pole and heading south to the South Pole, the 52nd meridian west passes through:

Co-ordinates	Country, territory or sea	Notes
90°0′N 52°0′W	Arctic Ocean	
83°38′N 52°0′W	Lincoln Sea	
82°16′N 52°0′W	Greenland	Castle Island, Hendrik Island and Warming Land
71°6′N 52°0′W	Uummannaq Fjord	
70°58′N 52°0′W	Greenland	Appat Island
71°6′N 52°0′W	Uummannaq Fjord	
70°52′N 52°0′W	Greenland	Nuussuaq Peninsula
70°1′N 52°0′W	Sullorsuaq Strait	
69°48′N 52°0′W	Greenland	Disko Island
69°33′N 52°0′W	Disko Bay	
68°37′N 52°0′W	Greenland	
64°7′N 52°0′W	Atlantic Ocean	
4°41′N 52°0′W	France	French Guiana
3°37′N 52°0′W	Brazil	Amapá; Pará — from 1°10′S 52°0′W; Mato Grosso — from 9°45′S 52°0′W; Goiás — from 15°51′S 52°0′W; Mato Grosso do Sul — from 18°58′S 52°0′W; São Paulo — from 21°31′S 52°0′W; Paraná — from 22°33′S 52°0′W; Santa Catarina — from 26°35′S 52°0′W; Rio Grande do Sul — from 27°23′S 52°0′W, passing through Lagoa dos Patos
32°5′S 52°0′W	Atlantic Ocean	
60°0′S 52°0′W	Southern Ocean	
76°54′S 52°0′W	Antarctica	Claimed by both Argentina (Argentine Antarctica) and United Kingdom (British Antarctic Territory)

== See also ==
- 51st meridian west
- 53rd meridian west
