= 1996–97 Australian region cyclone season =

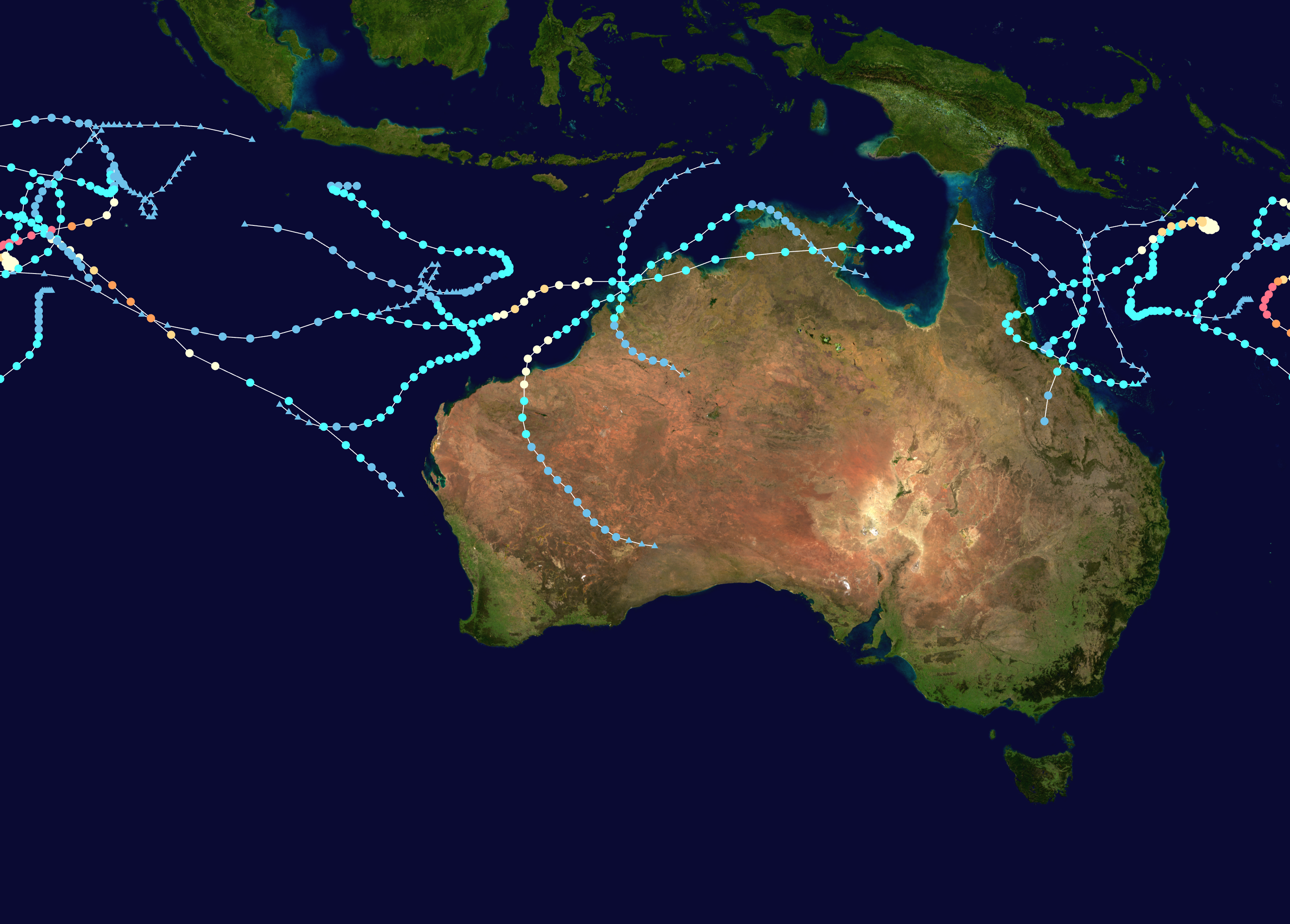
- Season summary map

Seasonal boundaries
- First system formed: 9 July 1996
- Last system dissipated: 16 May 1997

Strongest storm
- Name: Pancho-Helinda
  - Maximum winds: 205 km/h (125 mph) (10-minute sustained)
  - Lowest pressure: 915 hPa (mbar)

Seasonal statistics
- Tropical lows: 17
- Tropical cyclones: 15
- Severe tropical cyclones: 5
- Total fatalities: Unknown
- Total damage: Unknown

Related articles
- 1996–97 South-West Indian Ocean cyclone season; 1996–97 South Pacific cyclone season

The 1996–97 Australian region cyclone season was an above average tropical cyclone season. It ran from 1 November 1996 to 30 April 1997. The regional tropical cyclone operational plan also defines a tropical cyclone year separately from a tropical cyclone season, and the "tropical cyclone year" ran from 1 July 1996 to 30 June 1997.

Tropical cyclones in this area were monitored by four Tropical Cyclone Warning Centres (TCWCs): the Australian Bureau of Meteorology in Perth, Darwin, and Brisbane; and TCWC Port Moresby in Papua New Guinea.

== Systems ==
=== Tropical Cyclone Lindsay ===
- Category 1 tropical cyclone (Australian scale)
- Tropical storm (SSHWS)
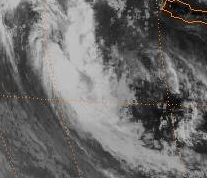
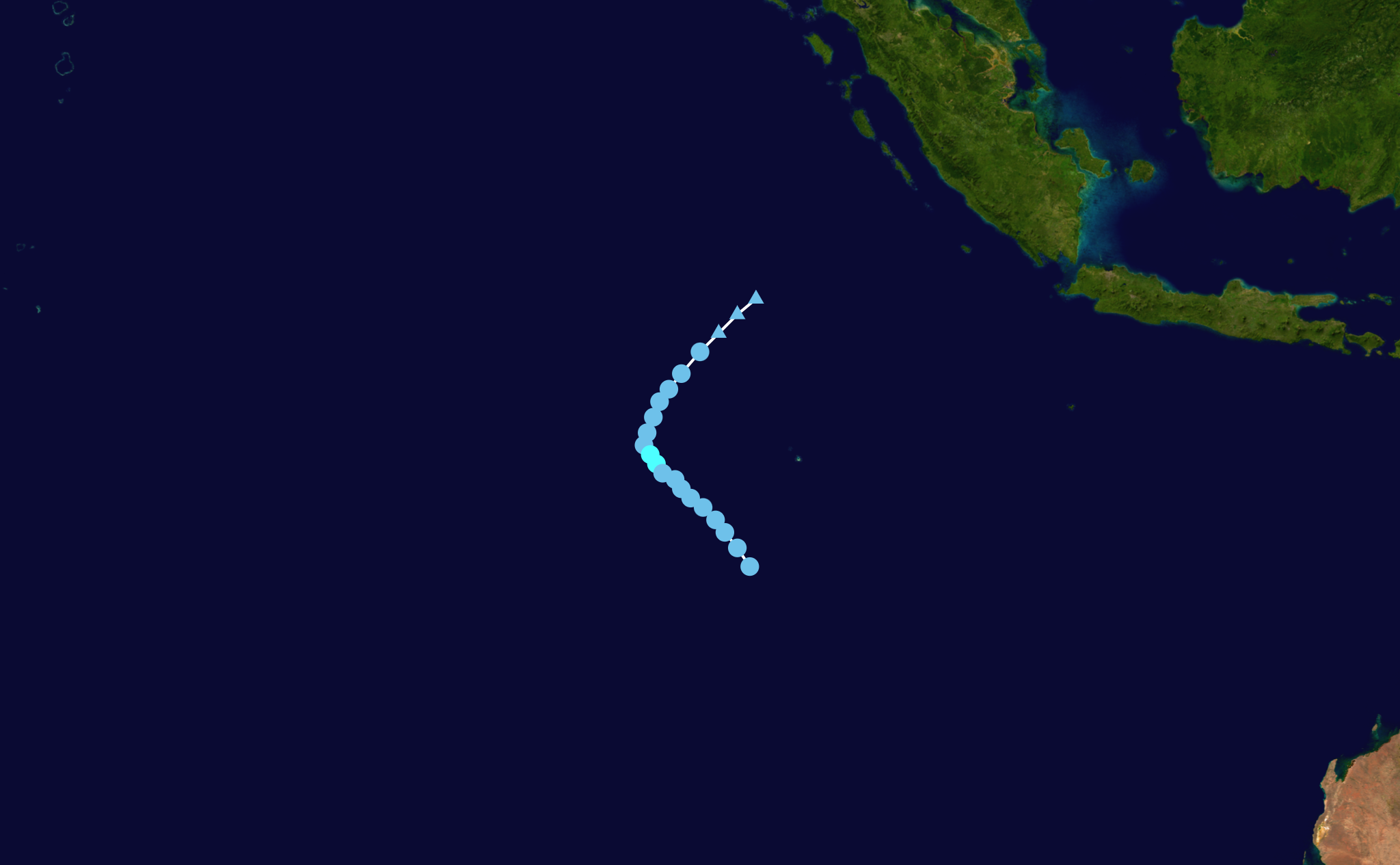
- Duration: 9 July – 13 July
- Peak intensity: 75 km/h (45 mph) (10-min); 990 hPa (mbar)

On 9 July, TCWC Perth reported that a tropical low had developed within the near-equatorial trough of low pressure, located about 500 km (310 mi) to the northeast of the Cocos Islands. During that day the system moved to the southwest around a weak mid-upper level anticyclone, before it came under the starting to move southwards during 10 July. At 1000 UTC that day, TCWC Perth reported that the low had developed into a category one tropical cyclone, and named it Lindsay as the system reached its peak 10-minute sustained windspeeds of 75 km/h (45 mph). At 1500 UTC, the JTWC reported that Lindsay was becoming better organized and issued a Tropical Cyclone Formation Alert on the system. Six hours later while Lindsay was at its 1-minute peak intensity of 65 km/h (40 mph), the JTWC designated the system Tropical Cyclone 01S and started to issue warnings on it. After the JTWC had initiated warnings on the system, it began to rapidly weaken as it came under the influence of strong upper level north-westerlies. During the next day, both the JTWC and TCWC Perth issued their final advisories on Lindsay as it weakened below cyclone intensity and became extratropical. Lindsay's remnants were tracked as they moved towards the southeast until they were absorbed into a broad trough of low pressure on 13 July.

=== Tropical Cyclone Melanie–Bellamine ===
- Category 1 tropical cyclone (Australian scale)
- Tropical storm (SSHWS)
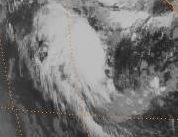
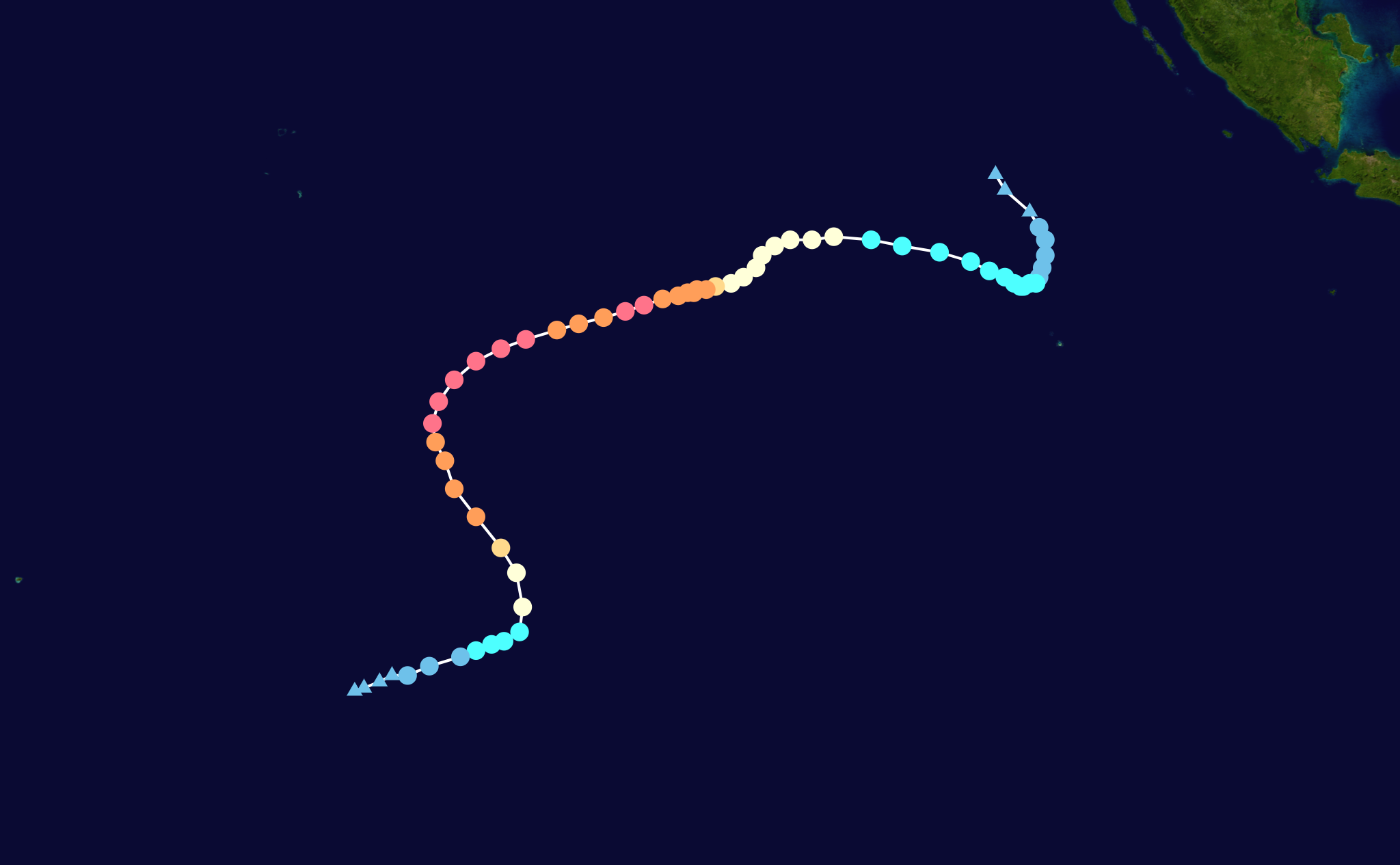
- Duration: 28 October – 1 November (Exited basin)
- Peak intensity: 75 km/h (45 mph) (10-min); 990 hPa (mbar)

Melanie formed from a low near Cocos Island on 30 October 1996. It deepened to a category 2 storm overnight on 1 November and it moved westwards, with a subsequent name change to Bellamine. It dissipated on 11 November.

=== Tropical Cyclone Nicholas ===
- Category 1 tropical cyclone (Australian scale)
- Tropical storm (SSHWS)
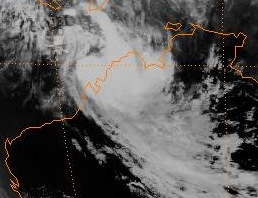
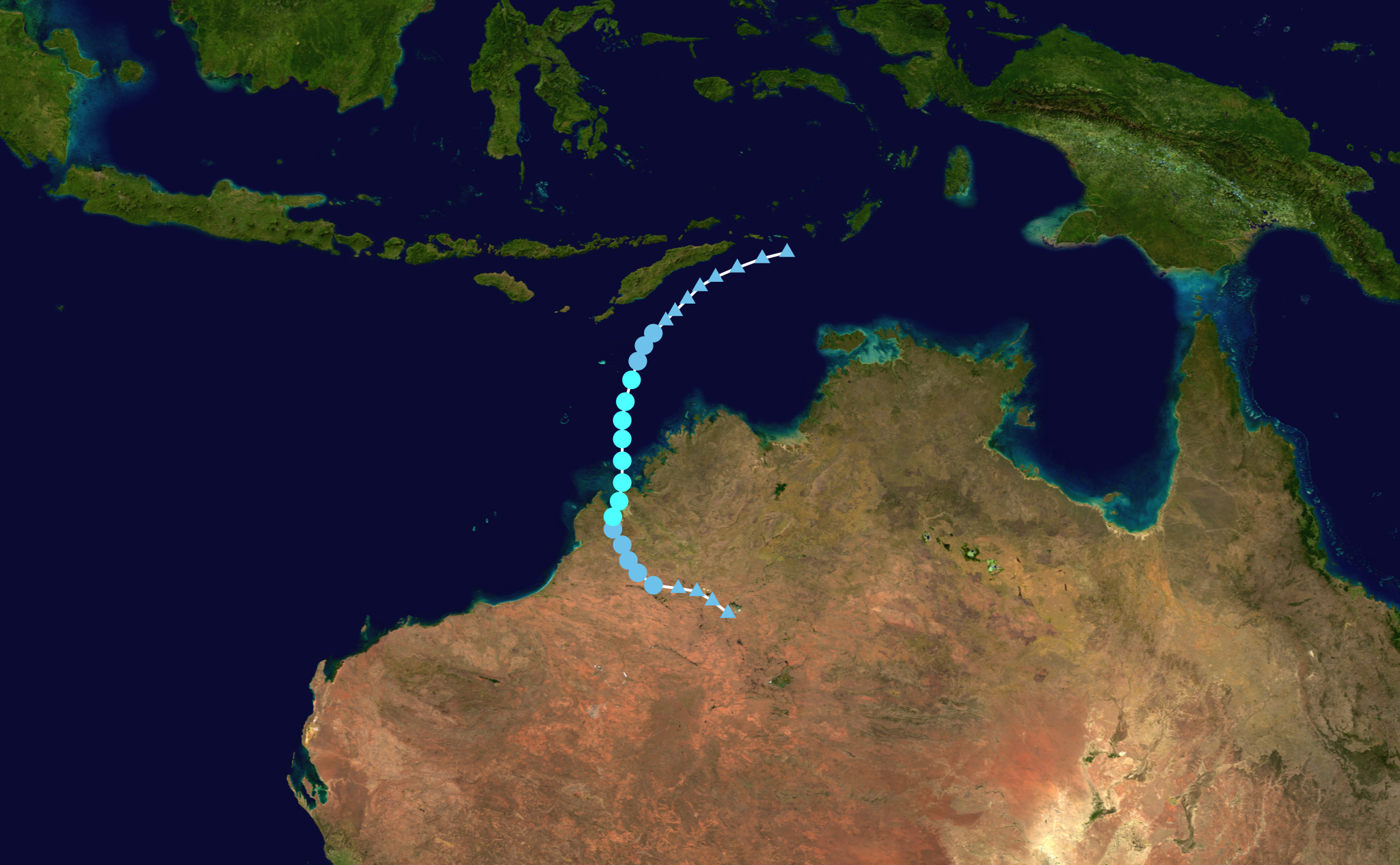
- Duration: 12 December – 15 December
- Peak intensity: 85 km/h (50 mph) (10-min); 985 hPa (mbar)

A tropical depression formed on 12 December 1996 near Timor. The depression moved south before being classified as a cyclone on 14 December and was named Nicholas. The storm made landfall west of Derby, Australia as a tropical storm on the 15th and dissipated the next day.

=== Tropical Cyclone Ophelia ===
- Category 2 tropical cyclone (Australian scale)
- Tropical storm (SSHWS)
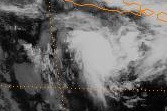
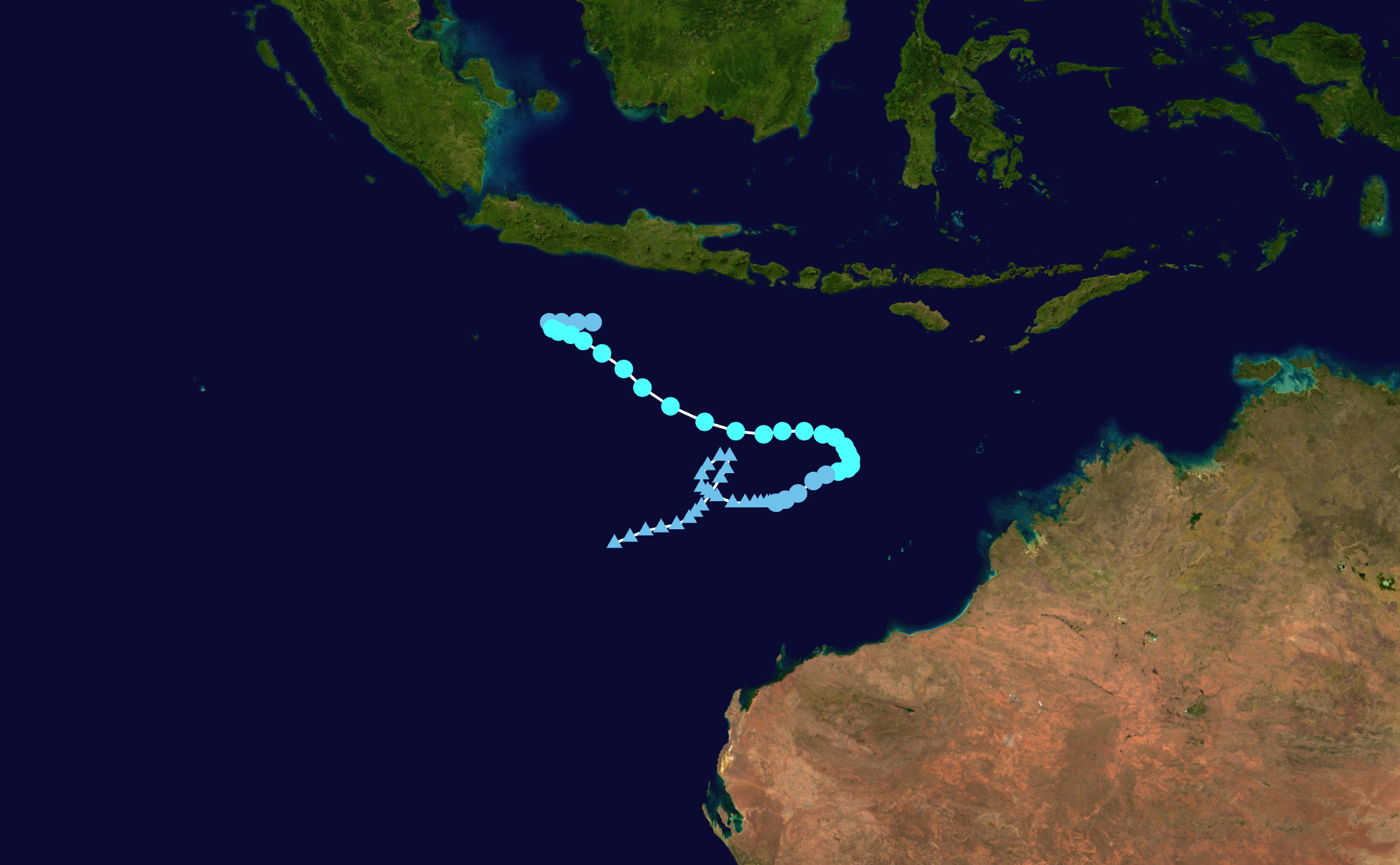
- Duration: 13 December – 19 December
- Peak intensity: 100 km/h (65 mph) (10-min); 980 hPa (mbar)

Ophelia formed between two tropical cyclones, Nicholas (near the north Kimberley coast) and Elvina near 80°E, to the east of Christmas Island on 13 December 1996. Its track was somewhat unusual in that it moved towards the southeast for most of its lifetime. The weak cyclone had no impact on Christmas Island or northwest Australia and dissipated on 19 December.

=== Tropical Cyclone Fergus ===
- Category 2 tropical cyclone (Australian scale)
- Category 1 tropical cyclone (SSHWS)
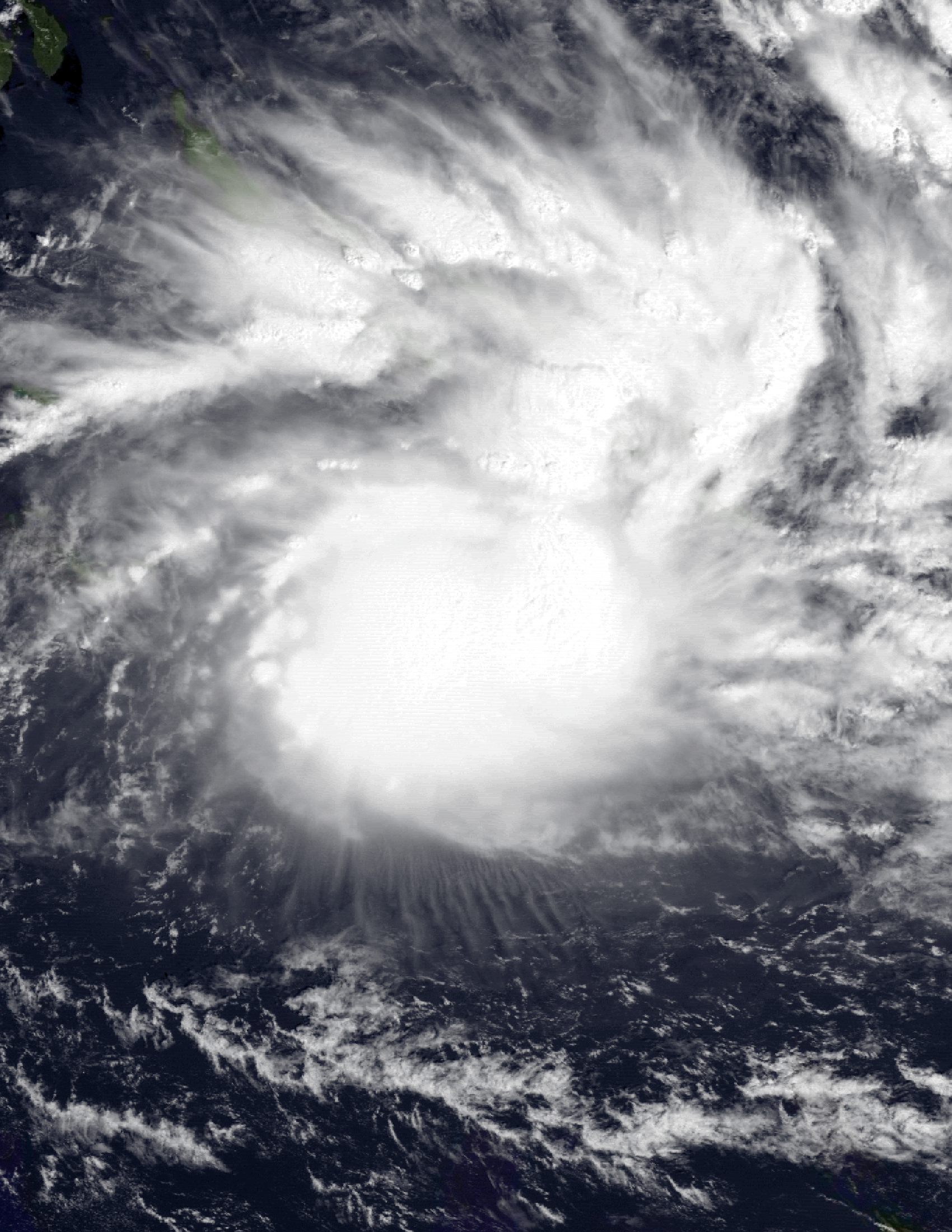
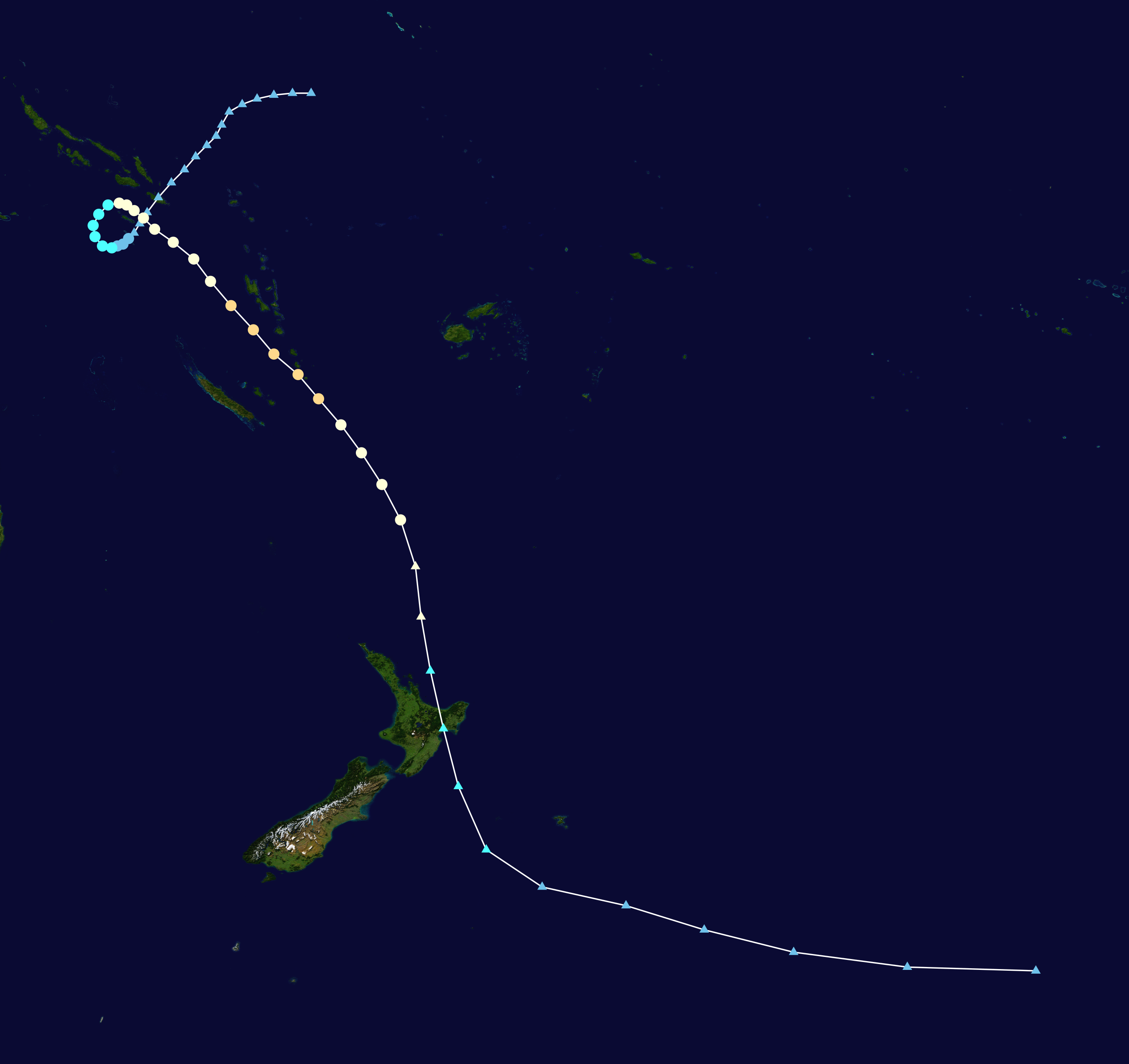
- Duration: 23 December (Entered basin) – 25 December (Exited basin)
- Peak intensity: 100 km/h (65 mph) (10-min); 975 hPa (mbar)

Fergus was a Category 2 storm that formed in the Pacific Ocean, lasting from 29 December to 31 December 1996 until becoming extratropical near New Zealand. The storm dropped heavy rainfall across an already saturated area, with totals of over 16.5 inches (420 mm) near Thames. The rainfall led to widespread flooding and forced many to evacuate. Severe road damage occurred, with some roads remaining closed for over a week. Gusty winds from Fergus downed trees and power lines, and caused property damage.

=== Tropical Cyclone Phil ===
- Category 2 tropical cyclone (Australian scale)
- Category 2 tropical cyclone (SSHWS)
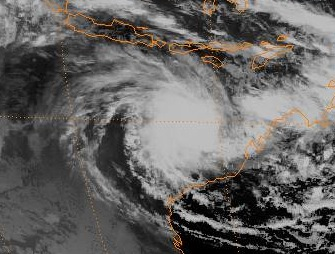
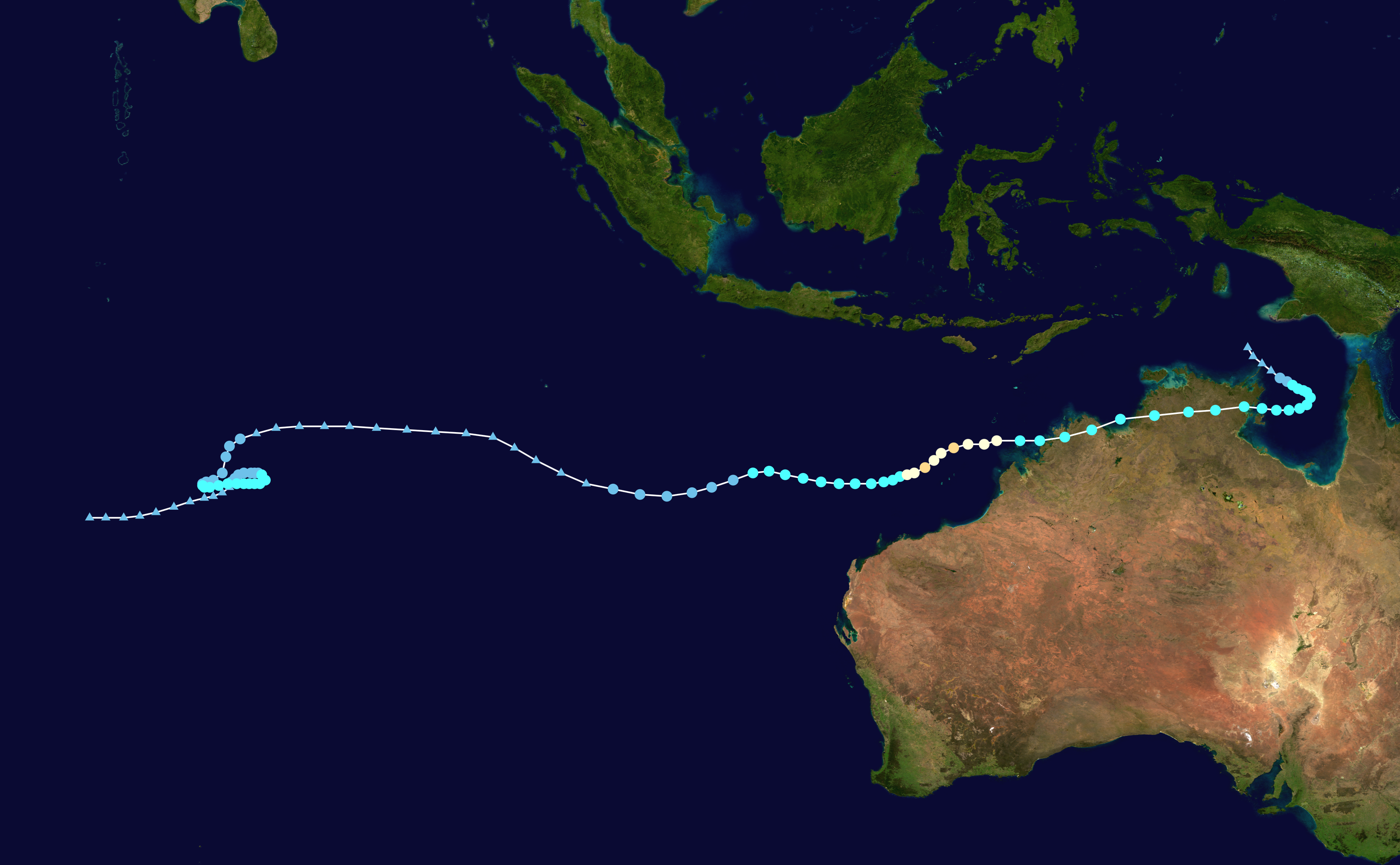
- Duration: 26 December – 3 January (exited basin)
- Peak intensity: 110 km/h (70 mph) (10-min); 975 hPa (mbar)

A weak cyclone, Phil crossed the northern part of Australia between 26 December and 27 December 1996. The storm then moved westward where it encountered vertical wind shear and dissipated on 31 December. It reformed in the South-West Indian Ocean basin on 8 January 1997 and remained as a tropical disturbance until it finally dissipated on 16 January.

=== Severe Tropical Cyclone Rachel ===
- Category 3 severe tropical cyclone (Australian scale)
- Category 1 tropical cyclone (SSHWS)
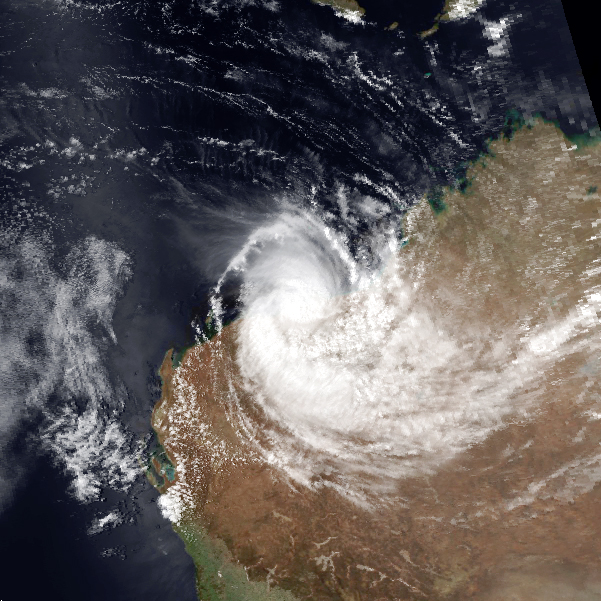
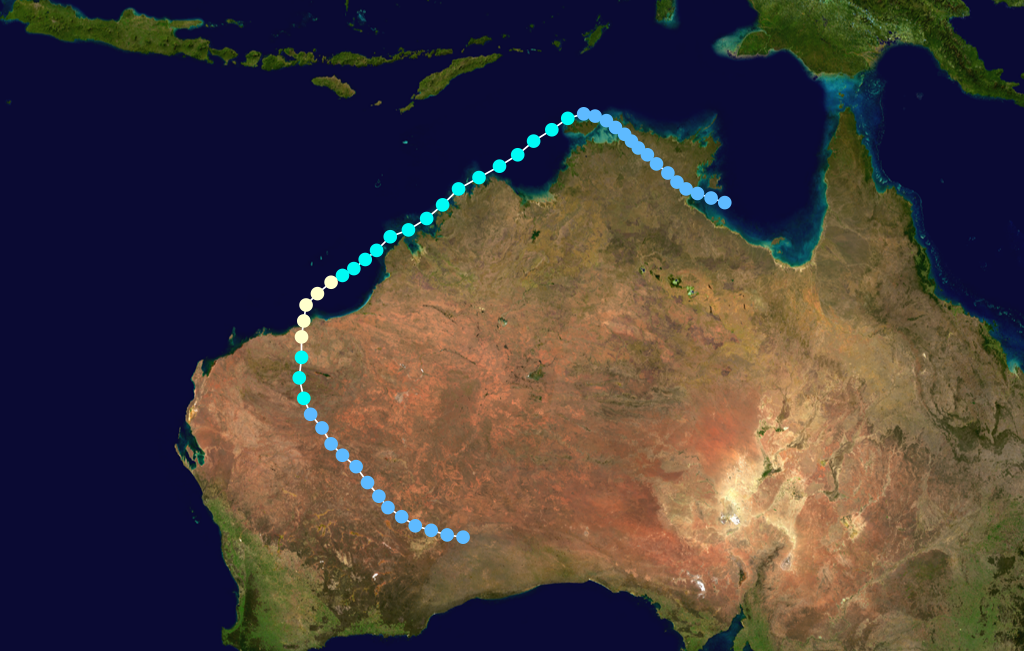
- Duration: 2 January – 10 January
- Peak intensity: 130 km/h (80 mph) (10-min); 965 hPa (mbar)

On 31 December, a tropical low formed from a monsoon trough inland, near Darwin. At that time, the convection was persistent on the mid-level circulation of the low as it moved slowly to the southwest. On 3 January, with favourable environmental conditions—including warm ocean waters and low wind shear, the low strengthened to Tropical Cyclone Rachel, while located to the south-southwest of Melville Island. The cyclone then slowly accelerated to the southwest, before passing over Northern Kimberley, which weakened the storm. On 5 January, it moved offshore near Cape Leveque as it moved parallel to the coastline. It rapidly strengthened to a Category 3 severe tropical cyclone as it accelerated to the south-southeast, before making a direct hit on Port Hedland on the afternoon of 7 January. It rapidly weakened inland and it was last noted on 10 January as it entered South Australia.

Despite the cyclone passing directly over Port Hedland, the damages are mostly minor. The power was lost in parts of the town, and some trees are uprooted. There were also reports of flooding. The highest accumulated rainfall by Rachel was on Yarrie, with 196 mm (7.7 in) in over 24 hours.

=== Severe Tropical Cyclone Drena ===
- Category 4 severe tropical cyclone (Australian scale)
- Category 4 tropical cyclone (SSHWS)
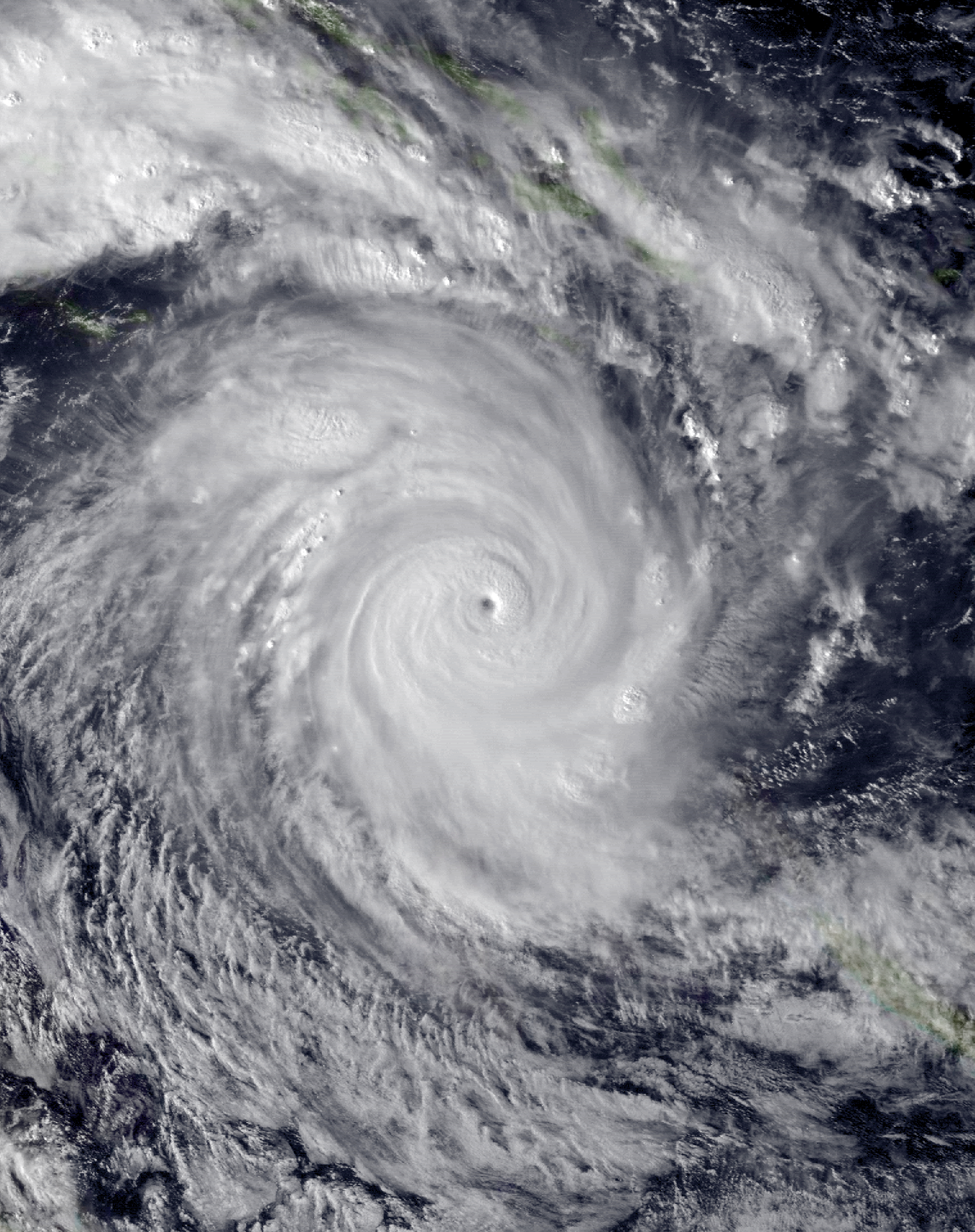
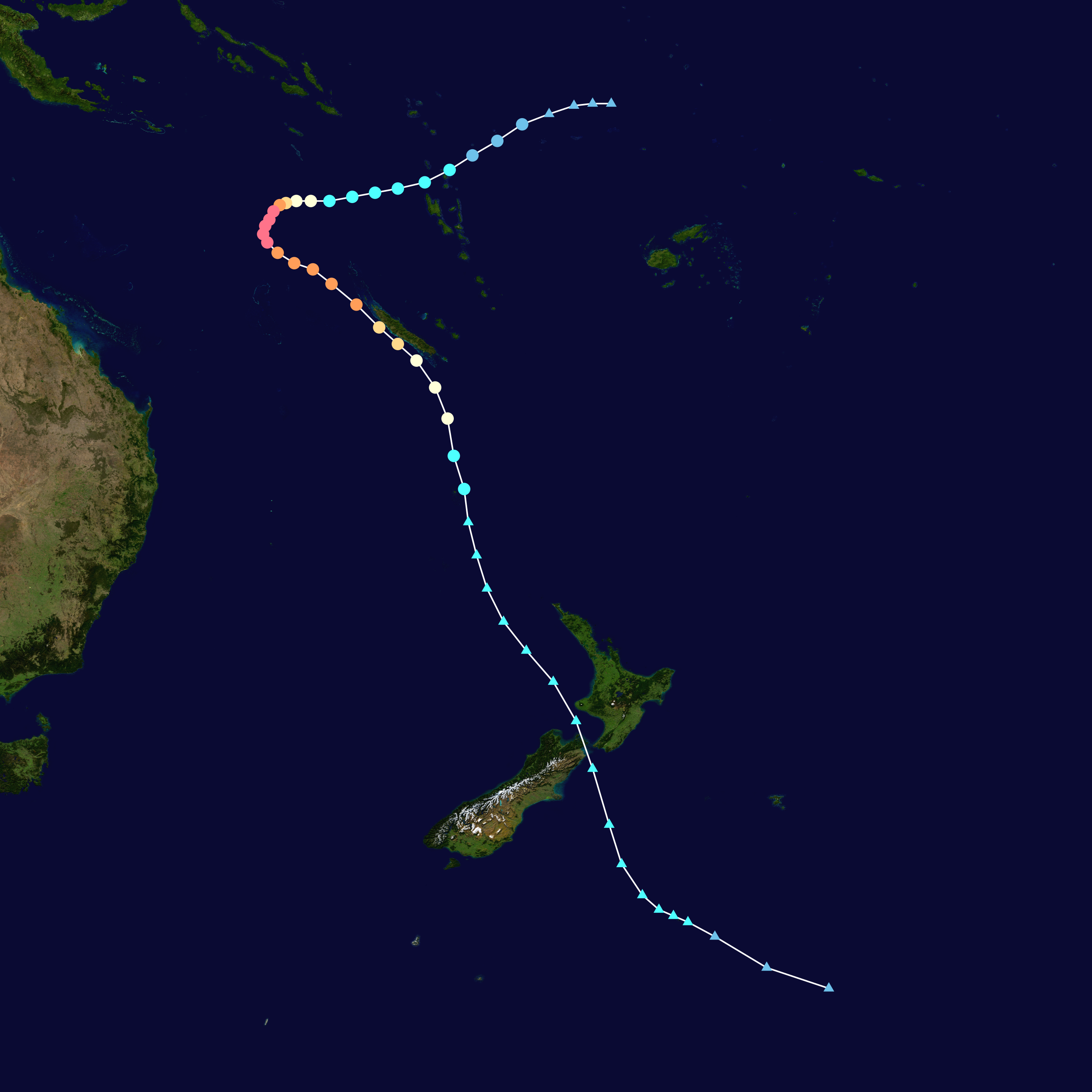
- Duration: 4 January (Entered basin) – 6 January (Exited basin)
- Peak intensity: 165 km/h (105 mph) (10-min); 935 hPa (mbar)

Cyclone Drena crossed from the South Pacific on 4 January with winds of 140 miles per hour. The storm again crossed out 2 days later.

=== Tropical Cyclone 18S ===
- Category 2 tropical cyclone (Australian scale)
- Tropical storm (SSHWS)
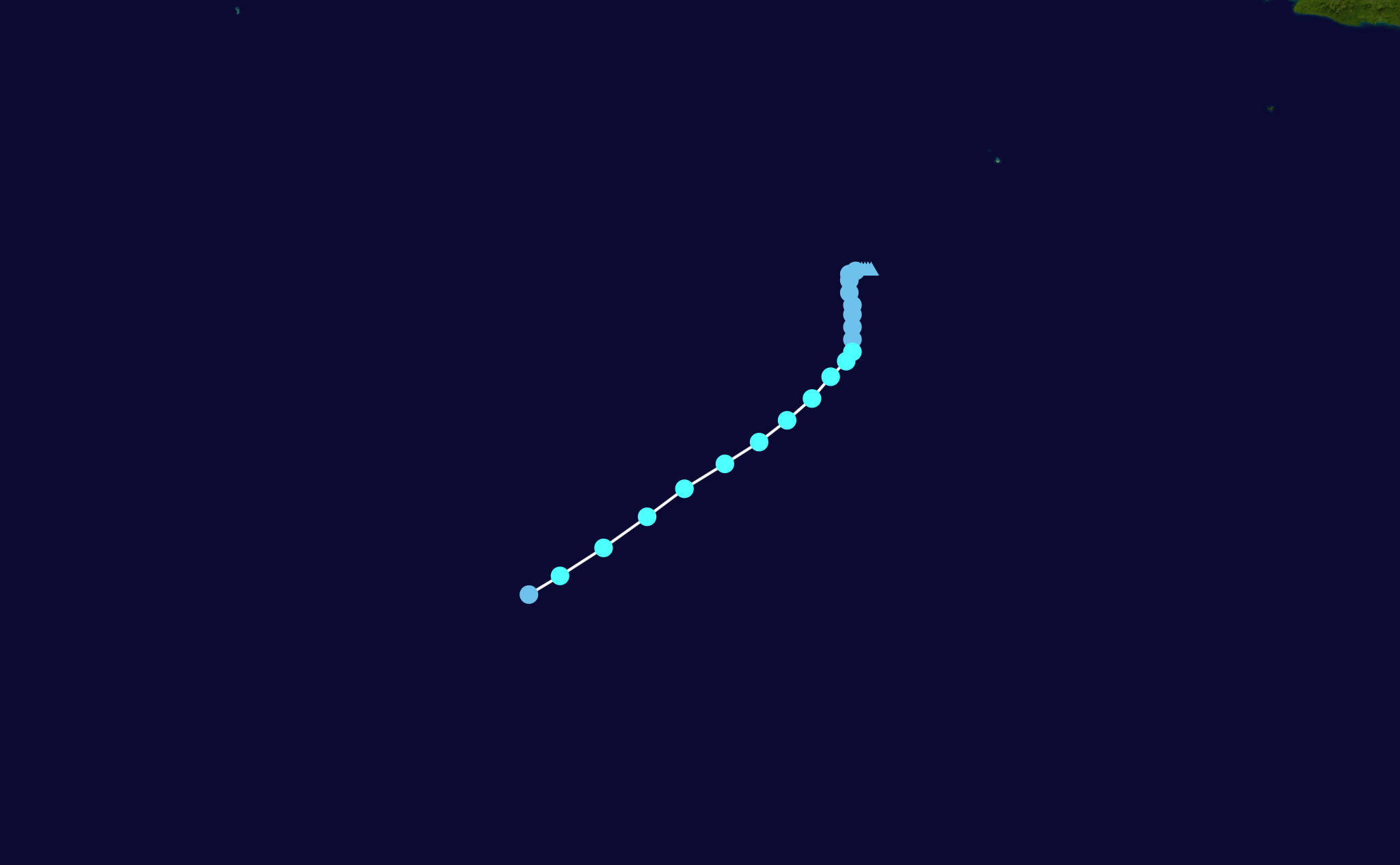
- Duration: 8 January – 12 January (Exited basin)
- Peak intensity: 95 km/h (60 mph) (10-min); 991 hPa (mbar)

=== Severe Tropical Cyclone Pancho–Helinda ===
- Category 5 severe tropical cyclone (Australian scale)
- Category 4 tropical cyclone (SSHWS)
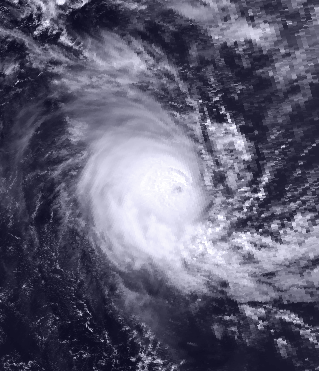
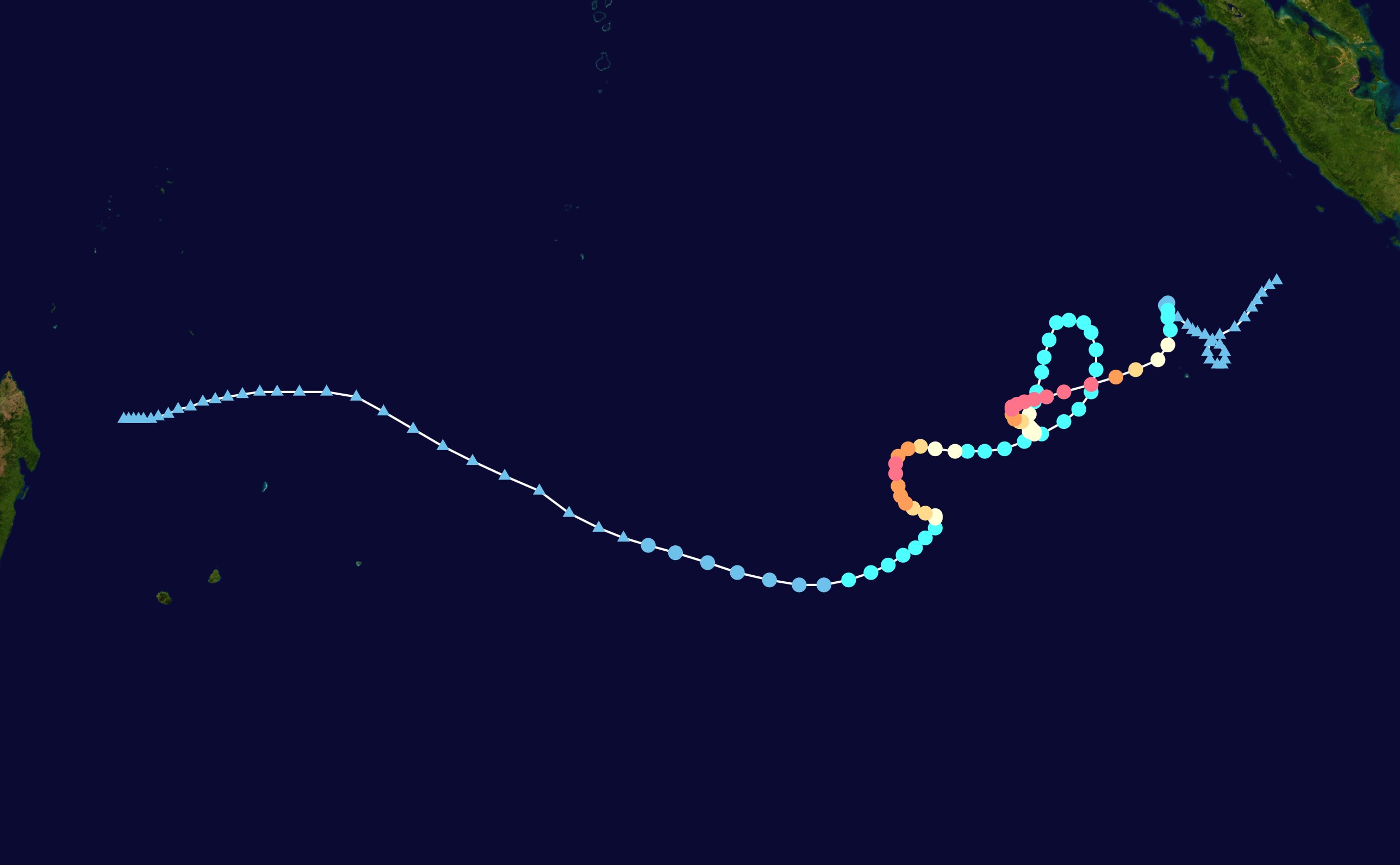
- Duration: 18 January – 22 January (Exited basin)
- Peak intensity: 215 km/h (130 mph) (10-min); 915 hPa (mbar)

Pancho formed to the north of Cocos Islands during 20 January 1997. It moved south towards Cocos Islands, then moved southwest, intensifying rapidly to a Category 4 or Category 5 cyclone with an estimated central pressure of 925 hPa by the morning of 22 January. Pancho then was renamed Helinda by the Mauritian TCWC and weakened. By 29 January Pancho/Helinda was moving from the northwest towards Cocos Islands again, however again it changed direction to the southwest and reintensified to Category 4. It finally weakened to a tropical depression by 5 February.

=== Tropical Cyclone Gillian ===
- Category 1 tropical cyclone (Australian scale)
- Tropical storm (SSHWS)
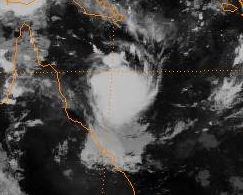
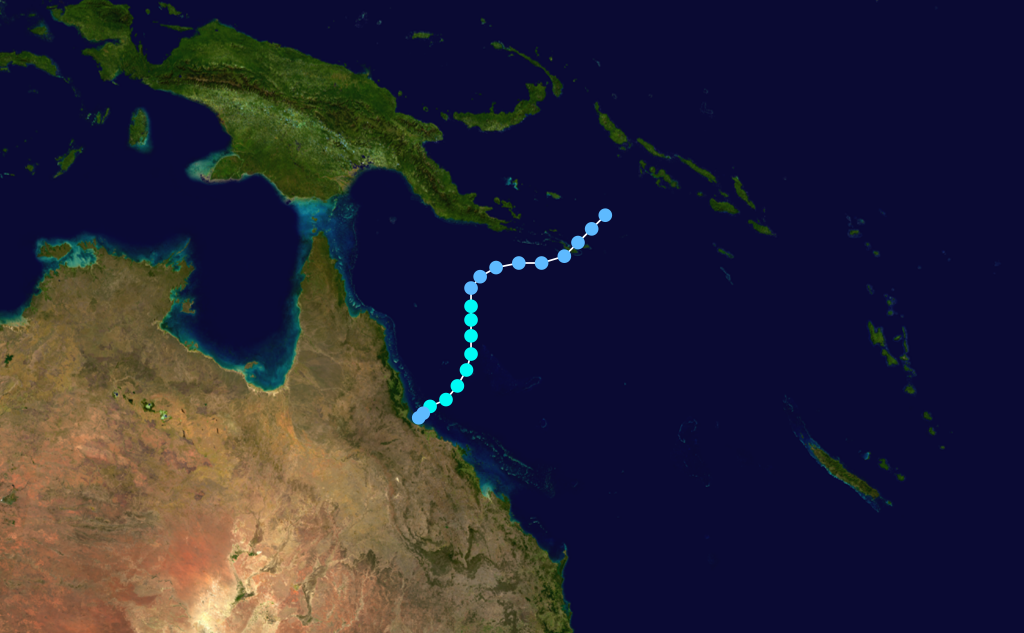
- Duration: 10 February – 12 February
- Peak intensity: 85 km/h (50 mph) (10-min); 995 hPa (mbar)

Tropical Cyclone Gillian existed from 10 February to 12 February.

=== Tropical Cyclone Harold ===
- Category 2 tropical cyclone (Australian scale)
- Tropical storm (SSHWS)
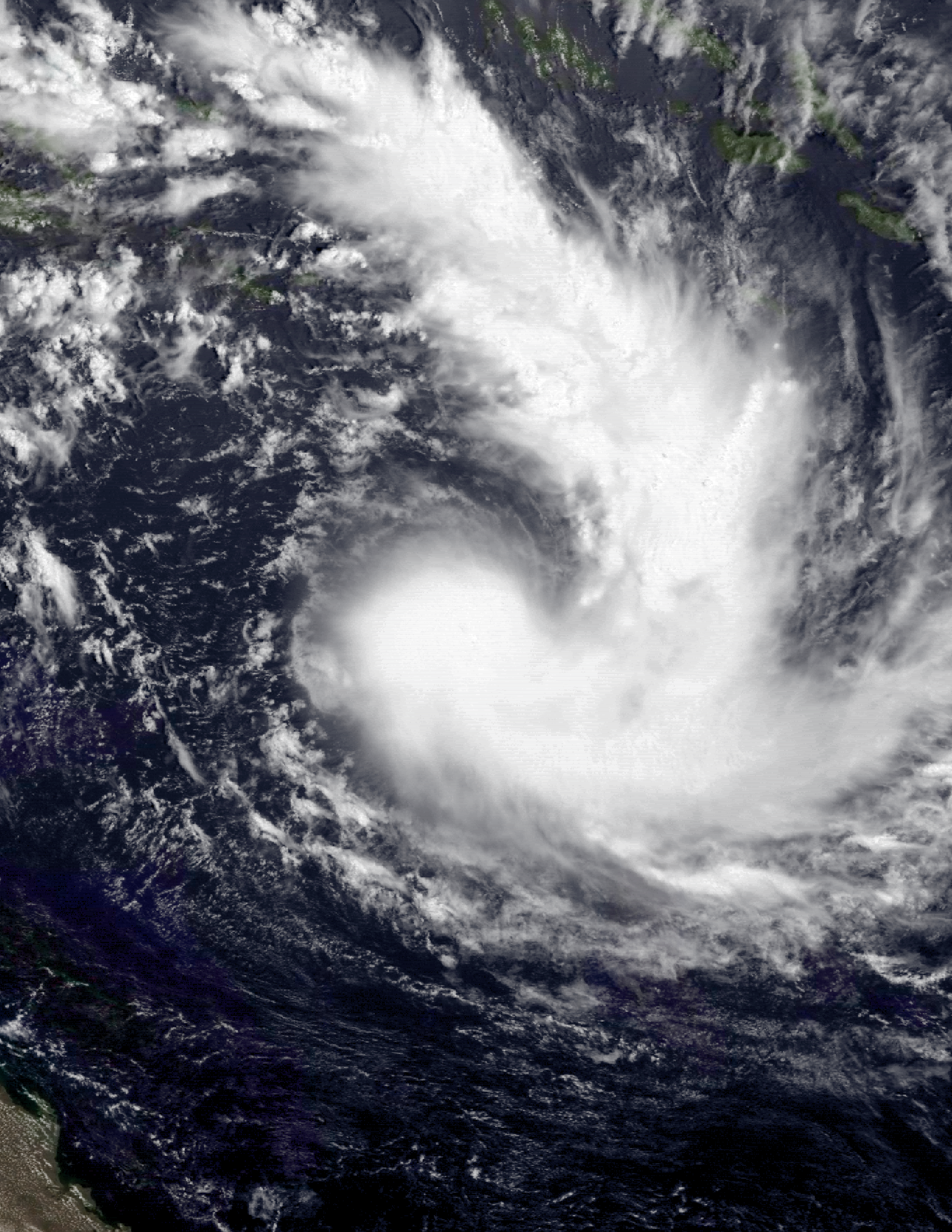
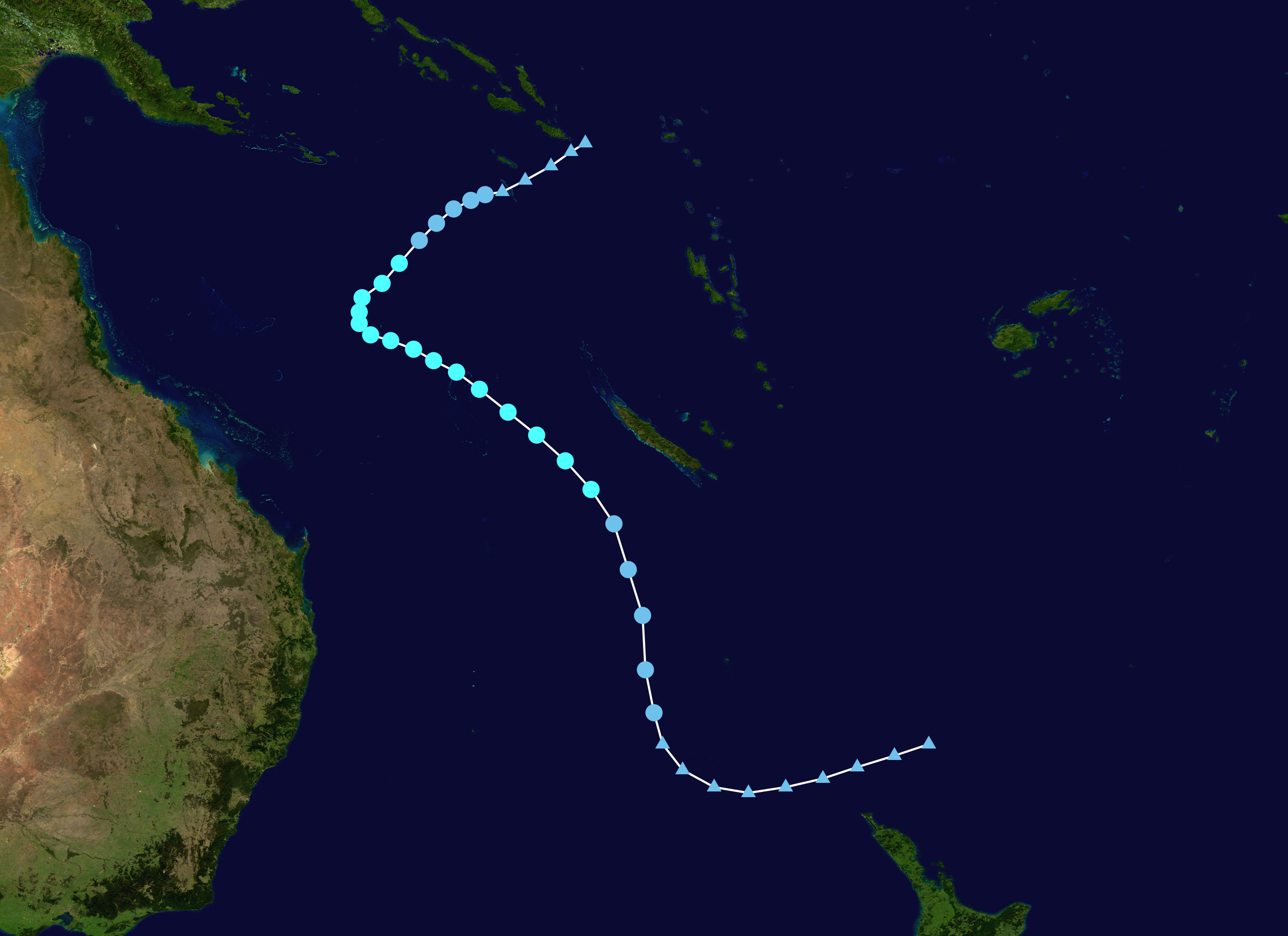
- Duration: 16 February – 19 February (Exited basin)
- Peak intensity: 110 km/h (70 mph) (10-min); 975 hPa (mbar)

Tropical Cyclone Harold existed from 16 February to 21 February.

=== Tropical Cyclone Ita ===
- Category 1 tropical cyclone (Australian scale)
- Tropical storm (SSHWS)
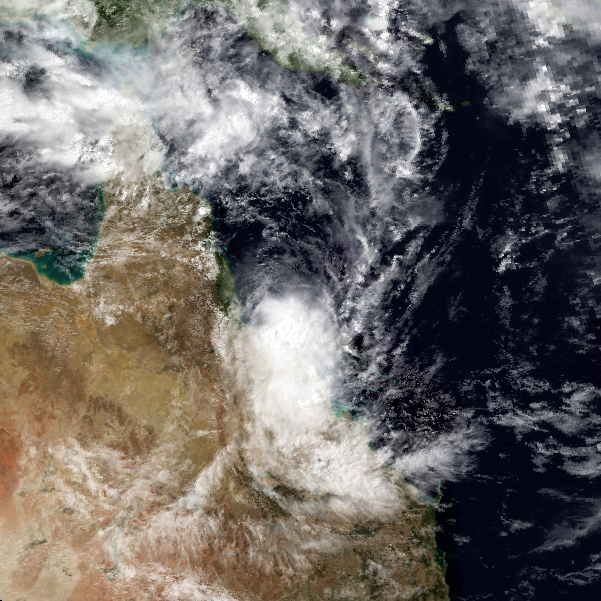
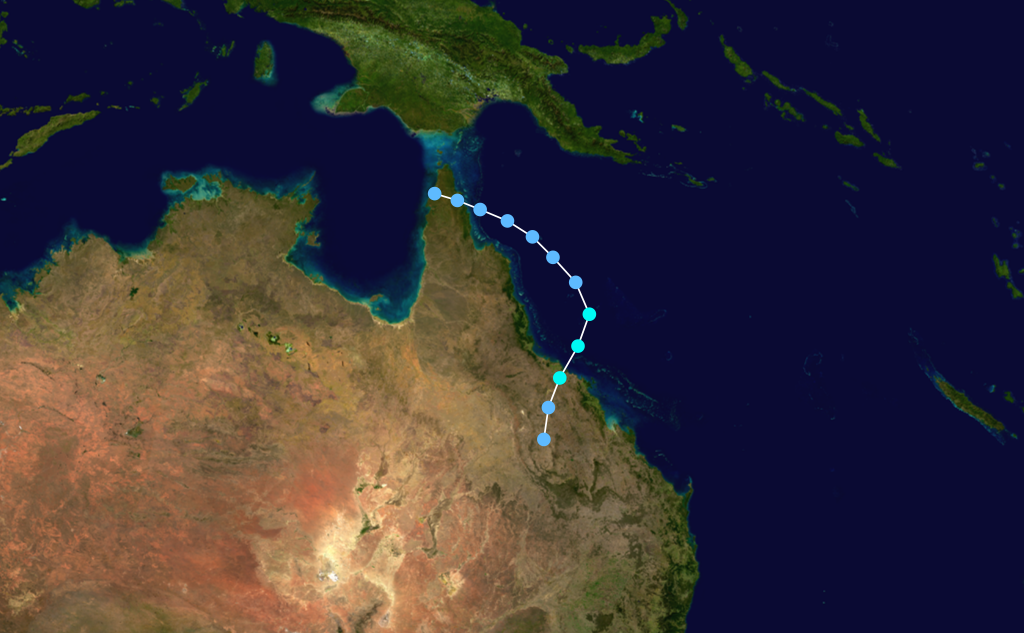
- Duration: 23 February – 24 February
- Peak intensity: 85 km/h (50 mph) (10-min); 994 hPa (mbar)

Tropical Cyclone Ita developed rapidly off the north coast of Queensland on 23 February 1997. The system moved southernly then southwest. The development inhibited from the northerly upper flow between an upper low over Queensland and an anticyclone in the Coral Sea and the lowest central pressure is reached with 994 hPa on 24 February. On the same day it makes landfall on the coast southeast of Townsville where it dissipated quickly.

Minimal wind damage, moderate flooding in rivers and creeks, and a tornado that occurred in Yukan were reported on 24 February.

=== Tropical Cyclone Justin ===
- Category 3 severe tropical cyclone (Australian scale)
- Category 2 tropical cyclone (SSHWS)
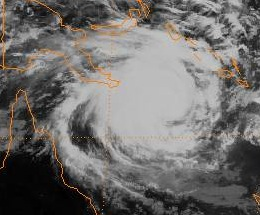
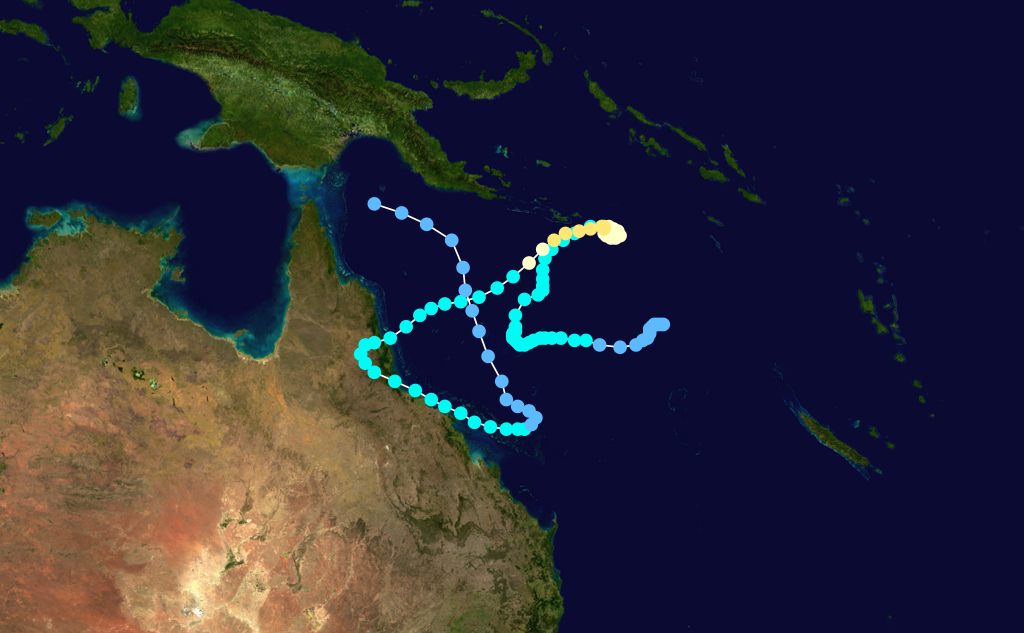
- Duration: 6 March – 24 March
- Peak intensity: 150 km/h (90 mph) (10-min); 955 hPa (mbar)

Justin had a long 3 1/2 week life in March 1997. Peaking as a Category 3 cyclone, and making landfall as a Category 2, it caused significant damage in the Cairns region which it approached on two occasions. It was the largest cyclone to hit Northern Queensland in 1997. Houses were undermined by huge waves, a marina and boats were severely damaged, roads and bridges suffered from flood and landslide damage and huge losses were inflicted on sugar cane, fruit and vegetable crops. The death toll in Queensland was seven including five on a yacht which sank. There were 26 who died in Papua New Guinea which was also severely affected. Total estimated costs in Australia were $190 million (1997 values).

=== Severe Tropical Cyclone Rhonda ===
- Category 4 severe tropical cyclone (Australian scale)
- Category 3 tropical cyclone (SSHWS)
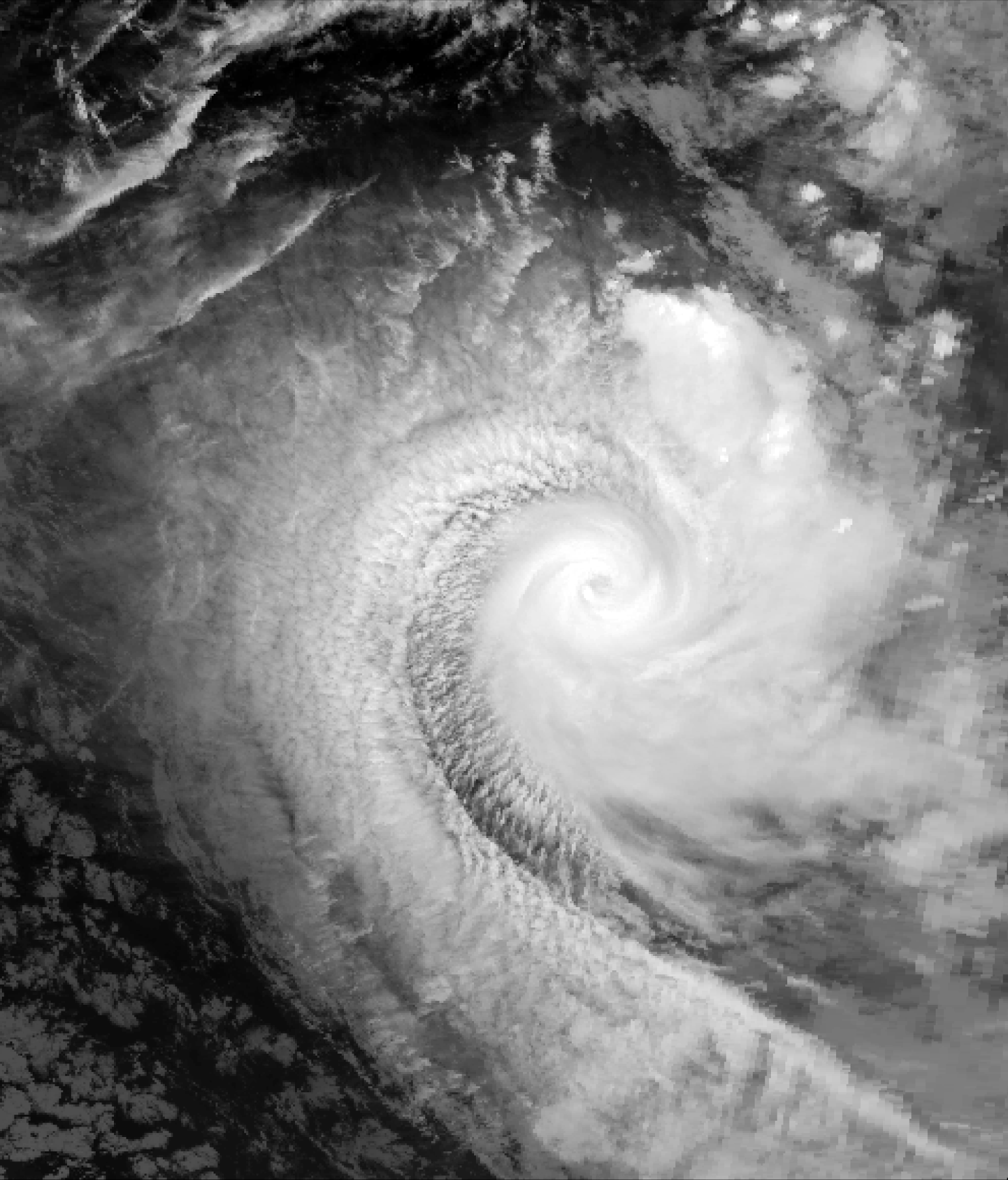
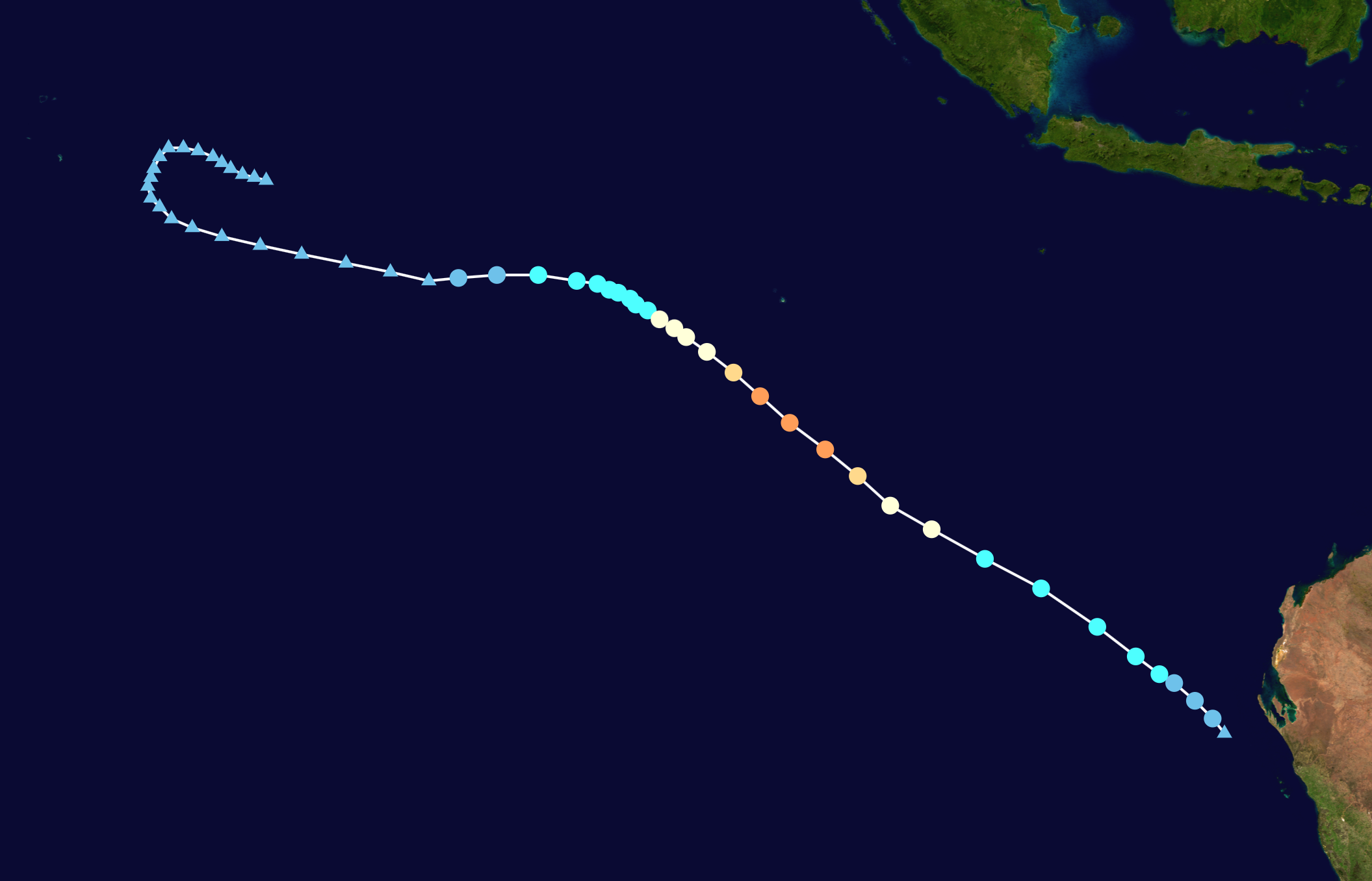
- Duration: 10 May – 17 May
- Peak intensity: 175 km/h (110 mph) (10-min); 935 hPa (mbar)

Cyclone Rhonda formed from an area of persistent convection near 10°S 80°E. It reached cyclone strength on 11 May 1997. Rhonda intensified into a Category 4 status. The cyclone continued moving south. The upper shear increased, resulting in rapid weakening before dissipating and being absorbed to a cut-off low pressure system near the Western Australia coast on 17 May. No damages were reported from the cyclone.

=== Other systems ===
On 15 October, TCWC Perth reported that a tropical low developed within a near equatorial trough of low pressure, to the southwest of the Indonesian island of Sumatra. Over the next few days, the low moved into the South-West Indian Ocean basin while developing further, before being named Antoinette by RSMC La Réunion during 18 October.

== Storm names ==
Tropical cyclones are assigned names by the Australian Bureau of Meteorology or Papua New Guinea. Tropical cyclones are named if they are non-frontal low pressure systems of synoptic scale developing over warm waters, or if Dvorak intensity analysis indicate the presence of gale force or stronger winds near the centre. Therefore, tropical systems with gales in one or more quadrants, but not near the centre, are not named. All names assigned in the Australian region are selected sequentially. Only the names used during this cyclone season are listed below. The complete list of names for each basin are found in the World Meteorological Organization's official lists.

Each Australian Tropical Cyclone Warning Centre (Perth, Darwin, and Brisbane) maintains a list of names arranged alphabetically and alternating male and female. Tropical cyclones that develop in the South-East Indian Ocean are assigned names by the Tropical Cyclone Warning Centre in Perth. This region includes the areas east of 90°E, south of the Equator, and west of 125°E. Tropical cyclones that develop south of the Equator between 125°E and 141°E are assigned names by the Tropical Cyclone Warning Centre in Darwin, Northern Territory. This area includes most of the cyclones that form in the Arafura Sea and Western Gulf of Carpentaria. Tropical cyclones in the Coral Sea and Eastern Gulf of Carpentaria between 141°E and 160°E and south of 10°S are assigned names by the Tropical Cyclone Warning Centre in Brisbane, Queensland.

Perth

Lindsay - Melanie - Nicholas - Ophelia - Pancho - Rhonda

Darwin

Phil - Rachel

Brisbane

Fergus - Gillian - Harold - Ita - Justin

The Bureau of Meteorology retired the names Fergus, Justin, Rachel and Rhonda, replacing them with Fletcher, Jack, Raquel and Rosie respectively. Rosie was used in 2008, Fletcher and Jack in 2014 and Raquel in 2015.

== Seasonal effects ==
Name	Dates	Peak intensity			Areas affected	Damage (USD)	Deaths	Ref(s).
Name	Dates	Category	Wind speed	Pressure	Areas affected	Damage (USD)	Deaths	Ref(s).
Lindsay	9 – 13 July	Category 1 tropical cyclone	75 km/h (45 mph)	990 hPa (29.23 inHg)	None	None	None	
Antoinette	15 – 17 October	Tropical Low	45 km/h (30 mph)	1000 hPa (29.53 inHg)	None	None	None	
Melanie – Bellamine	28 October – 1 November	Category 1 tropical cyclone	85 km/h (50 mph)	985 hPa (29.09 inHg)	None	None	None	
Nicholas	12 – 15 December	Category 1 tropical cyclone	85 km/h (50 mph)	985 hPa (29.09 inHg)	Western Australia	None	None	
Ophelia	13 – 19 December	Category 2 tropical cyclone	100 km/h (65 mph)	980 hPa (28.94 inHg)	None	None	None	
Fergus	22 – 25 December	Category 2 tropical cyclone	110 km/h (70 mph)	975 hPa (28.79 inHg)	Solomon Islands, Vanuatu; New Caledonia, New Zealand	Unknown	Unknown	
Phil	22 December – 3 January	Category 2 tropical cyclone	110 km/h (70 mph)	975 hPa (28.79 inHg)	Northern Australia, Western Australia	Unknown	Unknown	
Rachel	2–10 January	Category 3 severe tropical cyclone	130 km/h (80 mph)	965 hPa (28.50 inHg)	Northern Territory, Western Australia	Unknown	Unknown	
Drena	4 – 6 January	Category 4 severe tropical cyclone	170 km/h (105 mph)	935 hPa (27.61 inHg)	Solomon Islands, Vanuatu; New Caledonia, New Zealand	Unknown	Unknown	
18S	7 – 12 January	Category 2 tropical cyclone	95 km/h (60 mph)	992 hPa (29.29 inHg)	None	None	None	
Pancho	18 January – 4 February	Category 5 severe tropical cyclone	215 km/h (135 mph)	915 hPa (27.02 inHg)	None	None	None	
Gillian	8 – 12 February	Category 1 tropical cyclone	85 km/h (50 mph)	995 hPa (29.38 inHg)	Papua New Guinea, Queensland	Unknown	Unknown	
Harold	16 – 19 February	Category 2 tropical cyclone	110 km/h (70 mph)	975 hPa (28.79 inHg)	New Caledonia	Unknown	Unknown	
Unnamed	25 January – 10 February	Tropical Low	Not Specified	Not Specified	Western Australia	Unknown	Unknown	
Unnamed	19 – 24 February	Tropical Low	Not Specified	991 hPa (29.26 inHg)	Western Australia	Unknown	Unknown	
Ita	23 – 24 February	Category 1 tropical cyclone	85 km/h (50 mph)	994 hPa (29.35 inHg)	Queensland	Unknown	Unknown	
Unnamed	22 – 27 February	Tropical Low	35–55 km/h (25–35 mph)	998 hPa (29.47 inHg)	Northern Territory, Western Australia	Unknown	Unknown	
Justin	6 – 24 March	Category 3 severe tropical cyclone	150 km/h (95 mph)	955 hPa (28.20 inHg)	Solomon Islands, Papua New Guinea; Queensland	$190 million	34	
Rhonda	10 – 16 May	Category 4 Severe Tropical Cyclone	185 km/h (115 mph)	935 hPa (27.61 inHg)	Cocos Island, Western Australia	Unknown	None	
Season aggregates
17 systems	9 July – 16 May		215 km/h (135 mph)	915 hPa (27.02 inHg)				

== See also ==
- List of Southern Hemisphere tropical cyclone seasons
- Atlantic hurricane seasons: 1996, 1997
- Pacific hurricane seasons: 1996, 1997
- Pacific typhoon seasons: 1996, 1997
- North Indian Ocean cyclone seasons: 1996, 1997
