= 126th meridian east =

Line of longitude

126th meridian east (interactive map)

The meridian 126° east of Greenwich is a line of longitude that extends from the North Pole across the Arctic Ocean, Asia, Australia, the Indian Ocean, the Southern Ocean, and Antarctica to the South Pole.

The 126th meridian east forms a great circle with the 54th meridian west.

== From Pole to Pole ==
Starting at the North Pole and heading south to the South Pole, the 126th meridian east passes through:

Co-ordinates	Country, territory or sea	Notes
90°0′N 126°0′E	Arctic Ocean	
77°41′N 126°0′E	Laptev Sea	
73°31′N 126°0′E	Russia	Sakha Republic — islands of the Lena Delta and the mainland Amur Oblast — from 55°43′N 126°0′E
52°46′N 126°0′E	China	Heilongjiang — for about 10 km
52°40′N 126°0′E	Russia	Amur Oblast — for about 9 km
52°35′N 126°0′E	China	Heilongjiang; Inner Mongolia — for about 1 km from 50°56′N 126°0′E; Heilongjiang — from 50°55′N 126°0′E; Jilin — from 45°11′N 126°0′E
40°56′N 126°0′E	North Korea	For about 2 km
40°55′N 126°0′E	China	Jilin — for about 2 km
40°53′N 126°0′E	North Korea	
37°52′N 126°0′E	Yellow Sea	
34°53′N 126°0′E	South Korea	Several islands of Sinan and Jindo counties
34°15′N 126°0′E	Yellow Sea	Passing just west of the island of Jeju-do, South Korea (at 33°17′N 126°9′E)
33°17′N 126°0′E	East China Sea	
25°15′N 126°0′E	Pacific Ocean	Philippine Sea — passing just east of Calicoan Island, Philippines (at 10°56′N 125°50′E) — passing just east of Suluan Island, Philippines (at 10°45′N 125°58′E)
9°57′N 126°0′E	Philippines	Islands of Siargao and Middle Bucas
9°42′N 126°0′E	Pacific Ocean	Philippine Sea
9°18′N 126°0′E	Philippines	Island of Mindanao
6°54′N 126°0′E	Davao Gulf	
6°12′N 126°0′E	Pacific Ocean	
3°29′N 126°0′E	Molucca Sea	
1°48′S 126°0′E	Indonesia	Island of Mangole
1°54′S 126°0′E	Ceram Sea	
2°15′S 126°0′E	Indonesia	Island of Sanana
2°28′S 126°0′E	Banda Sea	
3°13′S 126°0′E	Indonesia	Island of Buru — westernmost point
3°18′S 126°0′E	Banda Sea	
7°40′S 126°0′E	Indonesia	Island of Wetar
7°55′S 126°0′E	Wetar Strait	
8°30′S 126°0′E	Timor-Leste	Island of Timor
9°6′S 126°0′E	Timor Sea	
13°7′S 126°0′E	Indian Ocean	
14°1′S 126°0′E	Australia	Western Australia
32°17′S 126°0′E	Indian Ocean	Australian authorities consider this to be part of the Southern Ocean
60°0′S 126°0′E	Southern Ocean	
66°17′S 126°0′E	Antarctica	Australian Antarctic Territory, claimed by Australia

== See also ==
- 125th meridian east
- 127th meridian east
