= 128th meridian east =

Line of longitude

128th meridian east (interactive map)

The meridian 128° east of Greenwich is a line of longitude that extends from the North Pole across the Arctic Ocean, Asia, Australia, the Indian Ocean, the Southern Ocean, and Antarctica to the South Pole.

The 128th meridian east forms a great circle with the 52nd meridian west.

== From Pole to Pole ==
Starting at the North Pole and heading south to the South Pole, the 128th meridian east passes through:

Co-ordinates	Country, territory or sea	Notes
90°0′N 128°0′E	Arctic Ocean	
77°28′N 128°0′E	Laptev Sea	
73°25′N 128°0′E	Russia	Sakha Republic — islands of the Lena Delta and the mainland Amur Oblast — from 55°40′N 128°0′E
49°35′N 128°0′E	China	Heilongjiang; Jilin — from 44°3′N 128°0′E
41°26′N 128°0′E	North Korea	
40°3′N 128°0′E	Sea of Japan	
38°51′N 128°0′E	North Korea	
38°19′N 128°0′E	South Korea	Mainland and the islands of Changseon and Namhae
34°42′N 128°0′E	East China Sea	
27°5′N 128°0′E	Japan	Okinawa Prefecture — island of Iheya
27°3′N 128°0′E	East China Sea	
26°42′N 128°0′E	Japan	Okinawa Prefecture — island of Okinawa
26°29′N 128°0′E	Pacific Ocean	Philippine Sea
2°12′N 128°0′E	Indonesia	Island of Halmahera
2°5′N 128°0′E	Halmahera Sea	
1°48′N 128°0′E	Indonesia	Island of Halmahera
1°18′N 128°0′E	Kao Bay	
1°6′N 128°0′E	Indonesia	Island of Halmahera
0°28′N 128°0′E	Halmahera Sea	
0°19′S 128°0′E	Indonesia	Island of Halmahera
0°41′S 128°0′E	Molucca Sea	
1°31′S 128°0′E	Indonesia	Island of Obira
1°43′S 128°0′E	Ceram Sea	
3°4′S 128°0′E	Indonesia	Islands of Seram and Ambon
3°46′S 128°0′E	Banda Sea	
8°9′S 128°0′E	Indonesia	Island of Moa
8°15′S 128°0′E	Timor Sea	
14°34′S 128°0′E	Australia	Western Australia
32°5′S 128°0′E	Indian Ocean	Australian authorities consider this to be part of the Southern Ocean
60°0′S 128°0′E	Southern Ocean	
67°2′S 128°0′E	Antarctica	Australian Antarctic Territory, claimed by Australia

== See also ==
- 127th meridian east
- 129th meridian east
