= South Australian borders =

Borders of Australian state

South Australia is a federated state of Australia that share land borders with five other major states and territories, i.e. Western Australia, Northern Territory, Queensland, New South Wales and Victoria. Out of all the states and internal territories of Australia, the only ones that it does not border are Tasmania, which is an island state separated from the Australian mainland; and the Australian Capital Territory and the Jervis Bay Territory, which are both enclave federal territories within New South Wales.

South Australia's state boundaries consist of sections of the Western Australia border, the Northern Territory borders, the Queensland borders, the New South Wales borders and the Victorian borders. These land borders are defined to the west by the 129° east longitude (129° east), to the north by the 26th parallel south latitude (26° south), to the east by 141° east longitude (141° east), while to the south is the Great Australian Bight. However, this is not where all borders are actually marked on the ground. In particular, the eastern border with Victoria is about 3.6 kilometres (about 2 minutes) west of the 141st meridian.

== History ==
Map showing the creation of the colonies/states and mainland territories

=== 1788–1832 ===
In 1788, Governor Phillip claimed the continent of Australia only as far west as the 135th meridian east longitude (135° east) in accordance with his commission. (26 January 1788 – Map)

The line of 129° east first became a border in Australia as the western border of New South Wales (NSW) in 1825 (16 July 1825 – Map).

On 16 July 1825, the western boundary of New South Wales was relocated at 129° east to take in the new settlement at Melville Island.

From 1825 to 1829 129° east was the NSW border.

Following the settlement of the Swan River Colony (SRC) in 1829 (2 May 1829 – Map), the eastern boundary was declared to be 129° east, that is coinciding with the western boundary of New South Wales at the time.

The colony of Western Australia (WA) was commissioned in March 1831.

From 1829 to 1832 129° east was the SRC/NSW border.

=== 1832–1836 ===
The name of the Swan River Colony changed to Western Australia in 1832 (6 February 1832 – Map).

From 1832 to 1846 129° east was the WA/NSW border.

=== 1836–1846 ===
South Australia became a colony in 1836 and until 1846 would be surrounded on land by New South Wales (NSW), with South Australia extending west to the 132° east longitude. (132° east) and north to 26° south (28 December 1836 – Map).

From 1836 to 1846 129° east was the WA/NSW border. 132° east was the SA/NSW border as were 26° south and 141° east.

=== 1846–1847 ===
In 1846 the colony of North Australia (NA) was proclaimed by Letters Patent, which was all of New South Wales north of 26° south (17 February 1846 – Map).

From 1846 to 1847 129° east was the WA/NSW border and the WA/NA border. 132° east was the SA/NSW border, while 26° south became the SA/NA border and 141° east remained the SA/NSW border.

=== 1847–1851 ===
In 1847 the colony of North Australia was revoked and reincorporated into New South Wales. (15 April 1847 – Map), so South Australia was once again surrounded by New South Wales on all land borders.

From 1847 to 1860 129° east was once again the WA/NSW border.

From 1847 132° east was again the SA/NSW border, and 26° south was also the SA/NSW border. 141° east would remain the SA/NSW border until 1851.

=== 1851–1859 ===
In 1851 South Australia's eastern border changed again when the colony of Victoria was proclaimed (1 July 1851 – Map).

From 1851 141° east would change to include both the SA/NSW border and the SA/VIC border.

=== 1859–1860 ===
In 1859 The colony of Queensland is proclaimed by Letters Patent, with its western border set at 141° east (6 June 1859 – Map).

From 1859 141° east would change to include the SA/QLD border, the SA/NSW border and the SA/VIC border.

=== 1860–1862 ===
In 1860 the western border of South Australia changed from 132° east to 129° east (1860 – MAP).

From this time on South Australia's western border was also the Western Australian border.

From 1860 129° east became the SA/WA border from south of 26° south & the WA/NSW border north of 26° south.

=== 1862–1863 ===
In 1862 Queensland's western border north of 26° south) was moved to 139° east (1862).

From 1862 26° south became shared as the SA/NSW border and the SA/QLD border between 139° east and 141° east.

=== 1863–1911 ===
In 1863 that part of New South Wales to the north of South Australia was annexed to South Australia by Letters Patent as the Northern Territory of South Australia, which was shortened to the Northern Territory (6 July 1863 – Map).

From 1863 to 1911 129° east was the WA/NToSA border north of 26° south & the WA/SA border south of 26° south. 26° south became the SA/NToSA border.

=== 1911–1927 ===
In 1911 the Northern Territory was split off from South Australia to be administered by the Commonwealth. (1 January 1911 – Map).

From 1911 to 1927 129° east was the WA/NT border north of 26° south & the WA/SA border to the south. 26° south became the SA/NT border.

=== 1927–1931 ===
In 1927 the Northern Territory was split into two territories, North Australia and Central Australia. (1 March 1927 – Map).

From 1927 26° south became the SA/CA border.

=== 1931–present ===
In 1931 North Australia and Central Australia were reunited as the Northern Territory (12 June 1931 – Map).

From 1931 26° south once again became the SA/NT border.

== Marking the borders on the ground ==
=== Marking the SA/WA border on the ground ===
See History of fixing SA/WA border on the ground

== The Border Corners ==
Australia map with named state corners

Corners in Australia
Name	Surveyor Generals	Poeppel	Haddon	Cameron	MacCabe
States	WA/NT/SA	NT/SA/Qld	SA/Qld	SA/Qld/NSW	SA/Vic/NSW

=== Surveyor Generals Corner ===
The actual West Australian border with the Northern Territory and South Australia, which has been marked on the ground, is not as straight as it looks, with the WA/NT and WA/SA borders being displaced by approximately 127 m due to early survey errors within the limits of technology available in the 1920s.

The 127-metre section that runs east–west along the 26° south is part of the border between Western Australia and the Northern Territory. In June 1968, two monuments were erected to mark each end of this 127-metre sideways section, the easternmost of these monuments, being where all three borders meet, was named Surveyor Generals Corner.

=== Cameron Corner ===
Cameron Corner is the point in the outback of eastern Australia where the boundary lines of the states of Queensland, South Australia, and New South Wales meet.

=== Haddon Corner ===
Haddon Corner is the north-eastern corner of the state of South Australia, where it meets with the border of Queensland. The point is located in the outback Channel Country district.

=== Poeppel Corner ===
Poeppel Corner (known as Poeppels Corner in Queensland) at latitude 26° S and longitude 138° E is a corner of state boundaries in Australia, where the state of Queensland meets South Australia and the Northern Territory.

=== MacCabe Corner ===
MacCabe Corner is a corner of state boundaries in Australia, where the state of Victoria meets South Australia and New South Wales.

== See also ==
- South Australia-Victoria border dispute
- Greenwich Time Signal
