= Northern Territory borders =

Today the Northern Territory's land borders are defined to the west by the 129° east longitude (129° east) with Western Australia, to the south by the 26th parallel south latitude (26° south) with South Australia and to the east by 138° east longitude (138° east) with Queensland; however, this is not where all borders are actually marked on the ground.

The Northern Territory boundaries are shared with the West Australian border, the South Australian border, and the Queensland border.

== History ==
Map showing the creation of the colonies/states and mainland territories

=== 1788–1832 ===
In 1788, Governor Phillip claimed the continent of Australia as far west as the 135th meridian east longitude (135° east) in accordance with his commission. (26 January 1788 – Map)

On 16 July 1825, the western boundary of New South Wales was relocated to the line of 129° east to take in the new settlement at Melville Island. (16 July 1825 – Map). From 1825 to 1829 129° east was the NSW border.

Following the settlement of the Swan River Colony in 1829 (2 May 1829 – Map), its eastern boundary was declared to be 129° east, coinciding with the western boundary of New South Wales at the time.

The colony of Western Australia (WA) was commissioned in March 1831.

From 1829 to 1832, the SRC/NSW border was at 129° east.

=== 1832–1836 ===
The name of the Swan River Colony was changed to Western Australia in 1832 (6 February 1832 – Map).

From 1832 to 1846, 129° east was the WA/NSW border.

=== 1836–1846 ===
South Australia became a colony in 1836 and until 1846 would be surrounded on land by New South Wales (NSW), with South Australia extending west to the 132° east longitude. (132° east) and north to 26° south (28 December 1836 – Map).

From 1836 to 1846 129° east was the WA/NSW border. 132° east was the SA/NSW border as were 26° south and 141° east.

=== 1846–1847 ===
In 1846 the colony of North Australia (NA) was proclaimed by Letters Patent, which was all of New South Wales north of 26° south (17 February 1846 – Map).

From 1846 to 1847 129° east was the WA/NSW border and the WA/NA border. 132° east was the SA/NSW border, while 26° south became the SA/NA border and 141° east remained the SA/NSW border.

=== 1847–1851 ===
In 1847 the colony of North Australia was revoked and reincorporated into New South Wales. (15 April 1847 – Map), so South Australia was once again surrounded by New South Wales on all land borders.

From 1847 to 1860 129° east was once again the WA/NSW border.

From 1847 132° east was again the SA/NSW border, and 26° south was also the SA/NSW border. 141° east would remain the SA/NSW border until 1851.

=== 1851–1859 ===
In 1851 South Australia's eastern border changed again when the colony of Victoria was proclaimed (1 July 1851 – Map).

From 1851 141° east would change to include both the SA/NSW border and the SA/VIC border.

=== 1859–1860 ===
In 1859 The colony of Queensland is proclaimed by Letters Patent, with its western border set at 141° east (6 June 1859 – Map).

From 1859 141° east would change to include the SA/QLD border, the SA/NSW border and the SA/VIC border.

=== 1860–1862 ===
In 1860 the western border of South Australia changed from 132° east to 129° east (1860 – MAP).

From this time on South Australia's western border was also the West Australian border.

From 1860 129° east became the SA/WA border from south of 26° south & the WA/NSW border north of 26° south.

=== 1862–1863 ===
In 1862 Queensland's western border north of 26° south) was moved to 139° east (1862).

From 1862 26° south became shared as the SA/NSW border and the SA/QLD border between 139° east and 141° east.

=== 1863–1911 ===
In 1863 that part of New South Wales to the north of South Australia was annexed to South Australia by Letters Patent as "the Northern Territory of South Australia", which was shortened to "the Northern Territory" (6 July 1863 – Map).

From 1863 to 1911 129° east was the WA/NToSA border north of 26° south & the WA/SA border south of 26° south. 26° south became the SA/NToSA border.

=== 1911–1927 ===
In 1911 the Northern Territory was split off from South Australia to be administered by the Commonwealth. (1 January 1911 – Map).

From 1911 to 1927 129° east was the WA/NT border north of 26° south & the WA/SA border to the south. 26° south became the SA/NT border.

=== 1927–1931 ===
In 1927 the Northern Territory was split into two territories, North Australia and Central Australia, with the border set at the 20° south. (1 March 1927 – Map).

From 1927 26° south became the SA/CA border.

=== 1931–Present ===
In 1931 North Australia and Central Australia were reunited as the Northern Territory (12 June 1931 – Map).

From 1931 26° south once again became the SA/NT border.

== Marking the NT borders on the ground ==
Marking the Northern Territory borders on the ground has a history.

=== Marking the NT/WA border on the ground ===
See NT/WA border marking history

== The Northern Territory" border corners ==
Australia map with named state corners

=== Surveyor Generals Corner ===
The West Australian border with the Northern Territory and South Australia, which has been marked on the ground, is not as straight as it looks, with the WA/NT and WA/SA borders being displaced by approximately 127 m, due to early survey errors within the limits of technology available in the 1920s.

The 127-metre section that runs east–west along the 26° south is part of the border between Western Australia and the Northern Territory. In June 1968, two monuments were erected to mark each end of this 127-metre sideways section; the easternmost of these monuments, being where all three borders meet, was named Surveyor Generals Corner.

=== Poeppel Corner ===
Also known as Poeppels Corner in Queensland, at latitude 26° S and longitude 138° E, this is a corner of state boundaries, where the state of Queensland meets South Australia and the Northern Territory.

Corners in Australia
Name	Surveyor Generals	Poeppel	Haddon	Cameron	MacCabe
States	WA/NT/SA	NT/SA/Qld	SA/Qld	SA/Qld/NSW	SA/Vic/NSW

== See also ==
- Greenwich Time Signal
