= Western Australian borders =

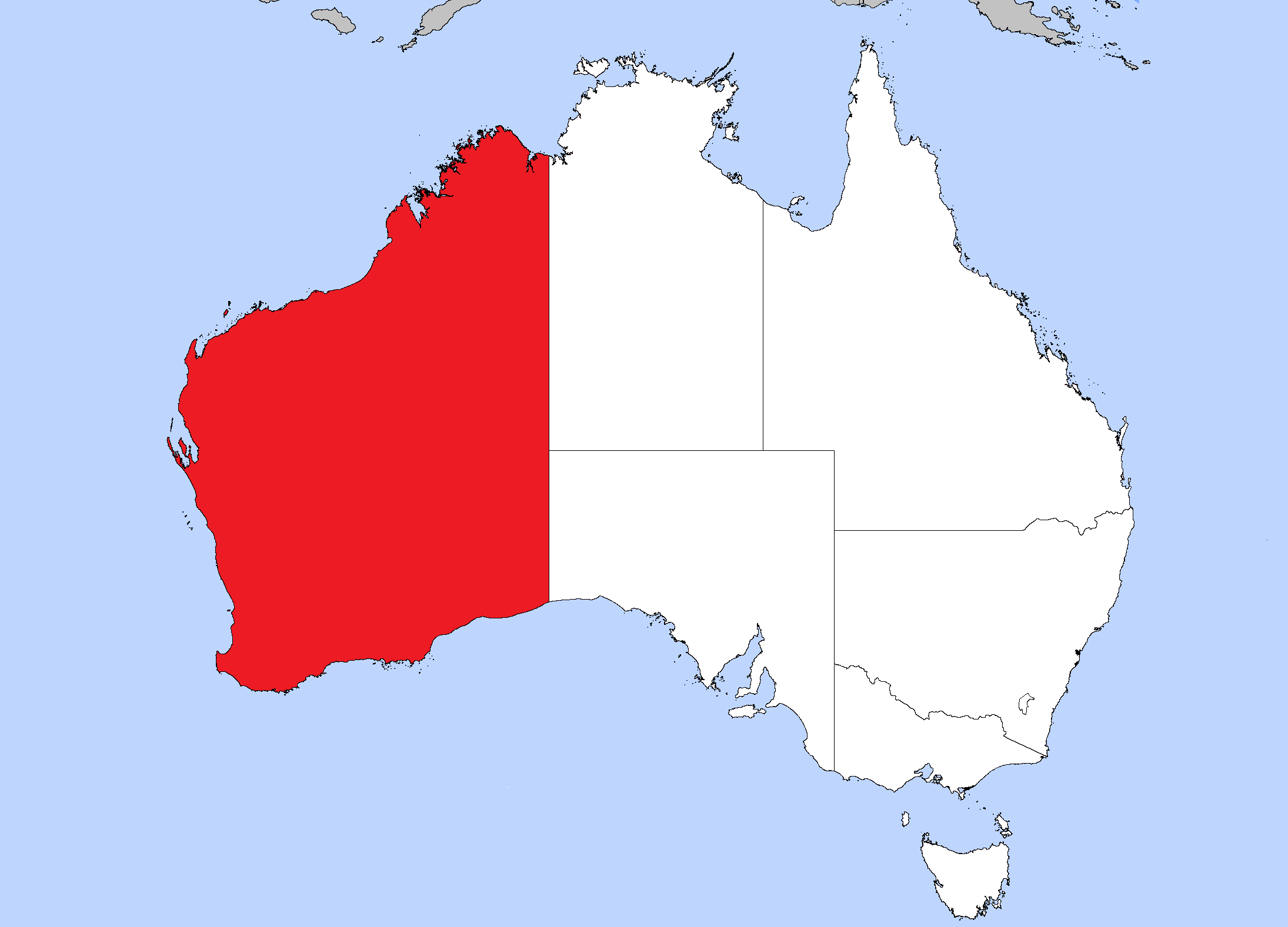
Western Australia highlighted within Australia

Western Australian borders are the boundaries of the Australian state of Western Australia. They follow the Indian Ocean coastline to the north, west, and south, and run overland near the 129th meridian east. The eastern land border is with the Northern Territory and South Australia. That eastern land border is not perfectly aligned with 129° east and deviates from that meridian at some points.

The closest Western Australian town to the eastern border is Kununurra, which lies about 25 kilometres (16 mi) west of the border with the Northern Territory. In South Australia, Border Village adjoins the Western Australian border.

== Border delineation ==
In some cases, the physical signage and structures that mark the actual border deviate from the 129th meridian. The Northern Territory border with Western Australia lies approximately 127 metres (417 ft) to the west of the South Australian border with Western Australia, as a result of errors caused by the technical limits of surveying technology in the 1920s.

Since the 1920s, the border has included an approximately 127-metre (417 ft) east–west area, which runs along the 26th parallel south latitude (26° south), immediately west of Surveyor Generals Corner – the point at which Western Australia, South Australia and the Northern Territory all meet. In June 1968, monuments were erected to mark both ends of this 127-metre (417 ft) east–west line.

== History ==
Map showing the creation of the colonies, states and mainland territories

=== 1788–1825 ===
In 1788, Governor Arthur Phillip claimed the continent of Australia as far west as the 135th meridian east (135° east) in accordance with his commission (map of 26 January 1788).

It has been suggested that the British claim of 135° east in 1788 was made with reference to Spain's claims under the Treaty of Tordesillas. Spain was seen as no longer having an interest in the area. The other signatory to the treaty, the Portuguese, still had a presence in Macau and East Timor. Adoption of 135° east as a boundary was intended to minimise provocation of the Portuguese. By 1825, Britain was in a position to adopt 129° east, the original Portuguese line under the treaty.

=== 1825–29 ===
The line of 129° east first became a border in Australia as the western border of New South Wales in 1825 (map of 16 July 1825).

On 16 July 1825, the western boundary of New South Wales was relocated to 129° east to incorporate the settlement on Melville Island. The border remained at 129° east until 1829. The settlement of King George's Sound, now Albany, was considered a semi-exclave of New South Wales from its establishment on 26 December 1826 until 7 March 1831, when it was made part of the Swan River Colony.

=== 1829–32 ===
The Swan River Colony, established in 1829 (map of 2 May 1829), had its eastern border set at 129° east, coinciding with the western boundary of New South Wales at the time.

=== 1832–46 ===
The Swan River Colony was renamed Western Australia in 1832 (map of 6 February 1832).

From 1832 to 1846, 129° east was the border between Western Australia and New South Wales.

=== 1846–47 ===
In 1846, the colony of North Australia was proclaimed by letters patent. It consisted of the part of New South Wales north of 26° south (map of 17 February 1846).

From 1846 to 1847, 129° east was the border between Western Australia and North Australia north of 26° south, and between Western Australia and New South Wales south of the 26th parallel.

=== 1847–60 ===
In 1847 the North Australia colony was revoked and reincorporated into New South Wales (map of 15 April 1847).

From 1847 to 1860, 129° east was once again the Western Australia and New South Wales border.

=== 1860–63 ===
In 1860, South Australia, which had been proclaimed a colony in 1836 with its western border at the 132° east (map of 28 December 1836), changed its western border to 129° east (map of 1860).

From 1860 to 1863, 129° east was the Western Australia–New South Wales border north of 26° south and the Western Australia–South Australia border south of the 26th parallel.

=== 1863–1911 ===
In 1863, the part of New South Wales to the north of South Australia was annexed to South Australia by letters patent and became known as the Northern Territory of South Australia (map of 6 July 1863).

From 1863 to 1911, 129° east was the Western Australia–Northern Territory of South Australia border north of 26° south and the Western Australia–South Australia border south of the 26th parallel.

=== 1911–27 ===
In 1911, the Northern Territory was split off from South Australia to be administered by the Commonwealth (map of 1 January 1911). From 1911 to 1927, 129° east served as the Western Australia–Northern Territory border north of 26° south and the Western Australia–South Australia border south of the 26th parallel.

=== 1927–31 ===
In 1927, the Northern Territory was split into two territories, North Australia and Central Australia (map of 1 March 1927).

From 1927 to 1931, 129° east formed the Western Australia–North Australia border and Western Australia–Central Australia border, both north of 26° south and the Western Australia–South Australia border south of the 26th parallel.

=== 1931–present ===
In 1931, North Australia and Central Australia were reunited as the Northern Territory (map of 12 June 1931).

From 1931 to the present, 129° east has been the Western Australia–Northern Territory border north of 26° south and the Western Australia–South Australia border south of the 26th parallel.

== Marking the Western Australian border on the ground ==
=== History of fixing the border ===
Determining the position of the Western Australian border has a long history. In March 1920, the Western Australian Government Astronomer Harold Curlewis gave a talk at the WA Museum about the history of determining longitude. His talk discussed the use of newly developed wireless time signals to determine the position of the border between South Australia and Western Australia, as close as possible to the 129th meridian east.

=== Western Australia–South Australia border marking ===
Preliminary work on the border determinations began in November 1920, when the South Australian Government Astronomer G. F. Dodwell and the Western Australian Government Astronomer Harold Curlewis met at Deakin, Western Australia on the East-West Trans-Australian Railway.

The other members of the party were Messrs, Clive Melville Hambidge and J. Crabb, of the Survey Department; Warrant Officer V. D. Bowen, in charge of wireless apparatus lent by the Defense Department; and Mr. C. A. Maddern, of the Adelaide Observatory, all from Adelaide.

Concrete piers for the astronomical observing instruments were erected in readiness for the final determinations in 1921. Observations were made to test the instruments and methods under field conditions before their use in 1921.

The expedition to determine 129° east on the ground attracted worldwide scientific interest and involved cooperation with the Astronomer Royal and the Royal Observatory, Greenwich. wireless time signals from the French Wireless Service were transmitted from the Lyon Observatory at Saint-Genis-Laval, near Lyon, France, from 17 to 24 November 1920. Wireless time signals were also sent from the Adelaide Observatory through the Adelaide Radio Station, allowing the beats of the Adelaide sidereal clock to be used as a control on the rate of the chronometer used for the boundary observation. After these initial tests, a comprehensive programme was arranged for the second stage of border determinations, from 20 April to 10 May 1921.

==== Deakin Pillar ====
One of these concrete piers, a cubic concrete block slightly smaller than one cubic metre (35 cu ft), was later named the Deakin Pillar (1921). It was used as the reference point for setting out the larger border marker, the Deakin Obelisk (1926).

==== Deakin Obelisk ====
The Deakin Pillar is approximately 2.82 kilometres (1.75 mi) west of the Deakin Obelisk. The Deakin Obelisk was erected as close as possible to 129° east using the technology available in 1926.

The Deakin Obelisk has a copper plug embedded in the top centre of the concrete obelisk. The plug marks the South Australia–Western Australia border on the ground, with the border line extending south to the coastline of the Great Australian Bight and north through the obelisk to 26° south.

==== Western Australia–Northern Territory border marking ====
Shortly after the 1921 determinations of the South Australia–Western Australia border, South Australian Government Astronomer G. F. Dodwell, Western Australian Government Astronomer H. B. Curlewis, and their party travelled on the State Shipping Service of Western Australia vessel Bambra to the port of Wyndham, Western Australia.

From Wyndham, they were guided by Michael Patrick ("M.P.") Durack to a point he regarded as the northern boundary between his Argyle Downs Station and Jack Kilfoyle's Rosewood Station, which also marked Western Australia's border with the Northern Territory at 129° east. Most of Rosewood Station is in the Northern Territory, although it extends south into the East Kimberley region of Western Australia.

Two concrete pillars were erected and portable radio masts set up before the scientists carried out the determinations using the same wireless time signals used at Deakin.

===== Austral Pillar =====
One of the concrete pillars, used as the point of the determinations, was marked by the expedition party to show its position relative to Greenwich. It became known as the Austral Pillar.

The Austral Pillar was later found to be about 2 kilometres (1.2 mi) east of the border at 129° east on that part of Rosewood Station, placing it inside the Northern Territory.

===== Kimberley Obelisk =====
The Kimberley Obelisk was erected as close as possible to 129° east. Over several weeks in 1927, a Western Australian survey crew from the Western Australian Department of Lands and Surveys travelled to Wyndham and then to the Austral Pillar site to set out the border from that point. They erected the more substantial Kimberley Obelisk at the border.

The Kimberley Obelisk has a copper plug embedded in the top of the concrete obelisk. The plug marks the Western Australia–Northern Territory border on the ground, near 129° east, with the border line extending north to the coastline near the Joseph Bonaparte Gulf and south through the obelisk to the 26th parallel.

== See also ==
- COVID-19 pandemic in Western Australia
- South Australia–Victoria border dispute
- Greenwich Time Signal
- Surveyor General
- Surveyor General of Western Australia
