= Poeppel Corner Survey Marker =

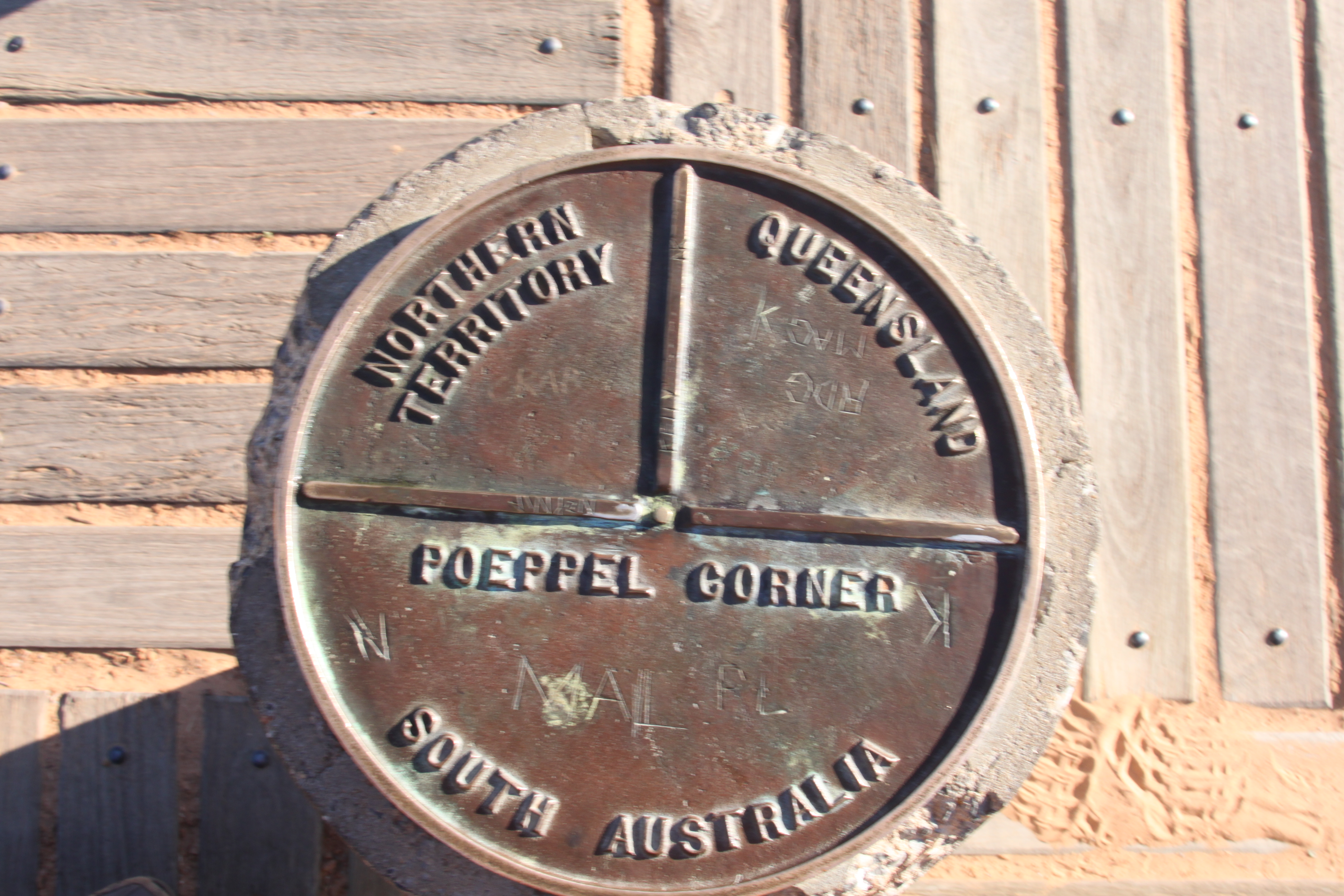
- Poeppel Corner Survey Marker, 2013

- Location within Queensland
- 25.9968°S 137.9991°E
- Location: On the border corner of Queensland, South Australia and Northern Territory, Birdsville, Shire of Diamantina, Queensland, Australia

History
- Design period: 1870s - 1890s

Queensland Heritage Register
- Official name: Poeppel Corner
- Type: state heritage (built)
- Designated: 9 November 2012
- Reference no.: 602808
- Significant period: 1880-

Poeppel Corner Survey Marker is a heritage-listed survey marker at Poeppel Corner on the border corner of Queensland, South Australia and Northern Territory. In Queensland it is with the locality of Birdsville in the Shire of Diamantina. It was added to the Queensland Heritage Register on 9 November 2012.

== Description ==
Poeppel Corner Survey Marker is at the westernmost of Queensland's three south-western corners located at the intersection of the Queensland, South Australia and Northern Territory borders, near Lake Poeppel - a salt lake. It is approximately 300 kilometres (190 mi) west of Haddon Corner and 450 kilometres (280 mi) north-west of Cameron Corner. The survey marker is within the Simpson Desert, a vast region in which linear dunes are the main landscape feature. The confluence of 26 degrees S 138 degrees E is between Lake Poeppel (immediately to the west) and a linear dune that trends SSE-NNW a little over half a kilometre to the east. There is a discrepancy of several hundred metres between the specified latitude and longitude and the officially mapped border.

Land on the Queensland side of the border is in the Munga-Thirri National Park while the South Australian side is part of the Munga-Thirri—Simpson Desert Conservation Park.

== Historical background ==
=== Evolution of Queensland's borders ===
Letters Patent issued by Queen Victoria in June 1859 separated the new Colony of Queensland from New South Wales (NSW). They described Queensland's border as the watershed from Point Danger (28°8"S) west to the Dumaresq River; the Dumaresq, Macintyre and Barwon Rivers to latitude 29 degrees South; and along latitude 29 degrees South to the 141st meridian of East longitude, which was the eastern boundary of South Australia.

Although legal opinion advised that the 141st meridian was the western boundary of Queensland, Surveyor-General Augustus Charles Gregory believed otherwise. In a memorandum of 28 September 1860 he wrote:

"the western boundary ... appears to be the 141st meridian; but it is probable that it was not described in the Letters Patent erecting the Colony, with greater distinctness, expressly with a view to a future adjustment, when more certain information should have been collected as to the natural features of the country... It is now submitted that the 141st meridian passes through the tract of country known as the `Plains of Promise" and that the Eastern shore [of the Gulf of Carpentaria] possesses no harbours. It would therefore be desirable to adopt the 138th meridian as the boundary; as that line would pass through a barren tract of country, and bring 'Investigator's Road' [an anchorage] within the limits of Queensland."

Furthermore, expeditions in 1861–1862 funded by the South Australian, Victorian and Queensland governments to rescue the missing explorers Burke and Wills, who had failed to return from a journey from Cooper Creek to the Gulf of Carpentaria, led to the exploration of an enormous area of the inland and were predicted to stimulate interest in this previously unknown tract of land beyond Queensland's western boundary. Writing to the Secretary of State for the Colonies on 5 September 1861, the Queensland Governor George Bowen indicated his colony's willingness to protect any settlers so attracted, provided that the western boundary could be extended to include the Gulf. The proposal was accepted on condition that the additional territory could be reclaimed later should another colony be formed in northern Australia.

In response, a despatch dated 14 December 1861 from the Secretary of State for the Colonies advised that the proposed annexation to the 138th Meridian of longitude should be revoked under Act 24 and 25 Victoria, c.44. This immediately provoked a despatch from Sir George Bowen, dated 18 January 1862, stating that Queensland had taken provisional control of this area. Subsequently, on 12 April 1862 Letters Patent were issued describing the accession of "so much of our Colony of New South Wales as lies to the northward of the 26th parallel of south latitude and between the 141st and 138th meridian of east longitude...". Thereby two more corners in Queensland's western boundary were created and the colony acquired part of the Barkly Tableland and the area which later became the Mount Isa mineral field. A revised definition of the extent of Queensland was subsequently proclaimed on 23 June 1862.

=== Settlement and need for surveys ===
During the 1870s, settlement extended west to the Diamantina, Mulligan and Georgina areas. In 1873, the pastoral districts were named - Gregory South comprised the Bulloo and lower Cooper area and the remainder became Gregory North. Initially runs in both districts were stocked with cattle and sheep. By 1885 all available land in Queensland's far south-west had been claimed. This land, comprising the floodplains of the Mulligan, Georgina, Diamantina and Bulloo Rivers and Cooper Creek, which form part of a vast inland drainage system originating in Queensland's central west and north-west and eventually reaching Lake Eyre, became known as Channel Country. During floods, the semi-arid region becomes a network of channels, watering cattle-fattening grasslands.

Agitation by pastoralists in the Cooper region for surveying of the border because of uncertainty as to its position began in the 1870s. In 1877 James McLeod, the new owner of Cullamurra run, applied to the South Australian Commissioner of Crown Lands to have the colony's border surveyed urgently, after finding himself in dispute with his eastern neighbour John Conrick of Nappa Merrie over their station boundaries.

Another factor in the determination of Queensland's borders was the collection of customs duties at the border and establishment of border customs offices. Inter-colonial border duties were introduced in Australia in the 1850s, after the Murray River became the boundary between New South Wales and Victoria. Their introduction demonstrated that the Australian colonies were developing in divergent and independent ways. As each new colony was declared, it established its own customs administration, which was responsible for the collection of lucrative custom duties and the prevention of smuggling.

As the western regions of the colony developed and internal trade routes were established, custom facilities were required along the borders with New South Wales and South Australia. In mid-1862, the Queensland Government had assented to the provisions of the New South Wales Border Customs Act, introduced to provide for a mutual Queensland-New South Wales system of collecting customs duties payable on goods crossing their shared border. Queensland's Customs Duties Act 1870 provided the colony with independent legislation to regulate the collection of duties on goods imported from other colonies. A small Customs Border Patrol consisting of a police inspector, sub-inspector and four constables was appointed with powers to collect duties from 1 January 1871. They travelled along the Queensland-New South Wales border, collecting duties and keeping careful records regarding the type and value of goods and the amount of monies collected. They also recommended 11 sites suitable for custom offices and these were later established. Those near the South Australian border were at Betoota, Birdsville and Oontoo.

=== Marking of the border, involvement of Augustus Poeppel ===
The marking of the Queensland-South Australian border was undertaken in 1879–1880 by the South Australian Government as the final section of a survey of its border on the 141st meridian, which had started at the Murray River. William Barron was the surveyor chosen to undertake the border survey, but after surveying from the Murray River to Cameron Corner then 90 miles (140 km) north to Cooper Creek, his health failed and he was forced to return to Adelaide.

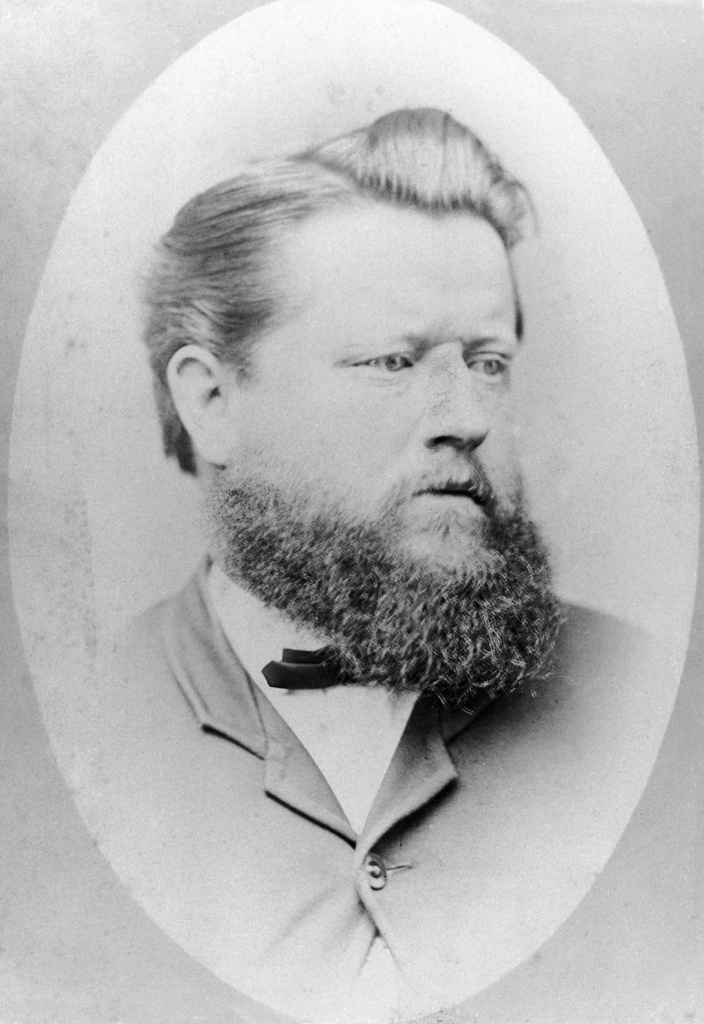
Augustus Poeppel, circa 1880

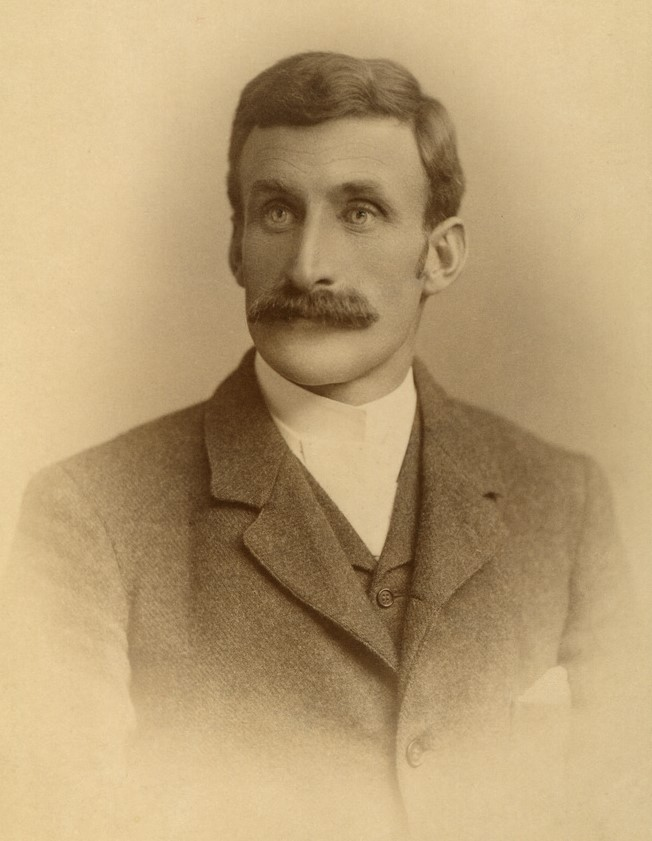
Lawrence Wells, circa 1890

Surveyor Augustus Poeppel took over the survey in January 1880, assisted by Lawrence Wells. He arrived at the survey camp at Innamincka on 3 February 1880, spent the following month taking observations and preparing rations and equipment, then on 5 March, with two months' rations and the animals in good condition, the survey team returned to work. They continued the line to the 26th parallel where they met their Queensland colleague Alexander Hutchinson Salmond. Together the surveyors took star observations for latitude to fix the position at 26 degrees S and 141 degrees E (now known as Haddon Corner, named after the nearby pastoral lease). After marking the corner they continued the survey line marking the border with mileposts recording the distance from the surveying starting point at the Murray River.

Then on 30 June 1880 Poeppel and his survey party began the westward survey along the 26th parallel, running a series of 10-mile chords and setting the mileposts on the arc of the parallel by calculated offsets. They experienced many hardships on this section of the survey traversing Australia's most inhospitable country - the vast waterless plains of the Sturt Stony Desert and the salt lakes and sand hills of the Simpson Desert. Their diet was salt beef and damper causing all to develop scurvy. They relied on Aboriginal people to guide them to wells as water was so scarce. They reached the final corner at 26 degrees South 138 degrees East, marking it with a timber post by the end of 1880. Drought forced them to return to Adelaide. Later the South Australian Triangulation Survey reached the border and on checking the mileposts, discovered an error in chainage and the corner post was relocated from the salt lake, Lake Poeppel, to its foreshore. Starting in 1883 Poeppel and Wells began the survey of the Queensland- South Australian border along meridian 141 degrees E.

== Background of Poeppel and Wells ==
Augustus Poeppel was born in Hamburg, Germany in 1839, the son of an architect. Emigrating with his family in 1849, he settled in South Australia before moving to Victoria to become a mining surveyor and architect. In 1878, after short periods in New Zealand and Western Australia, Poeppel joined the South Australian Lands Department and was soon appointed to the border surveys. During the Queensland- Northern Territory border survey, from the 142-mile post, he suffered from trachoma and lost 13 kilograms (29 lb) in weight, forcing his withdrawal in July 1885. His health was broken and he later lost sight in one eye. He retired to Melbourne where he died in 1891 aged 52.

Lawrence Wells, born in 1860 in South Australia, entered that colony's Survey Department in 1878. In the following year, at the age of 23, he joined the border surveys, eventually assisting with almost the entire survey of the Queensland-South Australian- Northern Territory borders, completed in 1886. Later Wells became a well-known explorer, known as "the last of the great inland explorers". In 1891–92 he accompanied the Elder Scientific Exploring Expedition, which discovered the East Murchison goldfield; in 1896 he led the Calvert Scientific Exploring Expedition, investigating northern Western Australia; and in 1903 he led South Australia's North-West Prospecting Expedition. Later Wells held administrative positions in the state and federal public services, and was appointed Order of the British Empire in 1937.

== As a landmark ==
Since the nineteenth century, various explorers of the Simpson Desert have included a visitation to Poeppel Corner. In 1883 the corner was visited by another South Australian surveyor, Charles Winnecke who, after departing from Farina in northern South Australia, headed north-west to Poeppel Corner, later exploring the south-eastern and north- eastern sections of the desert to assess its pastoral potential. Although disappointed with his findings, he travelled deeper into the desert than anyone before him. The next explorer to visit Poeppel Corner came many years later. In 1936, Edmund Albert (Ted) Colson, a pastoralist of Blood Creek Station, near Abminga, in northern South Australia, became the first European to cross the Simpson Desert. Colson crossed from west to east, travelling along the 26th parallel from Mount Etingambara, hoping to locate the Poeppel Corner post and then follow the border mileposts to Birdsville. However, on his eastward journey, Colson missed the post by 300 metres (980 ft), but located it on his return journey. To record his passing, he photographed it and nailed a tin plate to it bearing the date and his initials. Other explorations across Simpson Desert, notably those by David Lindsay in 1886 and Cecil Madigan in 1939, came close by Poeppel Corner but did not actually visit it. So, it was not until the 1960s that it was visited again, in a series of vehicular crossings made by Dr Reg Sprigg of Geosurveys Australia. By that time the original corner post had deteriorated due to white ants and dry rot, prompting Sprigg to take it to Adelaide for conservation treatment.'

The area was opened up to scientific investigation and tourism by the Sprigg expeditions, together with a well-publicised crossing made in 1966 by the Leyland Brothers which proved that the Simpson Desert was accessible to four-wheel drive vehicles. In 1967 a large part of the desert became protected with the proclamation of South Australia's Simpson Desert National Park (now Munga-Thirri–Simpson Desert National Park) and Queensland's Simpson Desert National Park (now Munga-Thirri National Park); the latter being extended in 1983. By this time, interest in the desert was increasing, with many people visiting Poeppel Corner. In 1986 the Friends of the Simpson Desert Conservation Park was formed in South Australia to assist with the park's conservation. In 1989 the group erected a replica of the original post at Poeppel Corner. Poeppel Corner is a well-known tourist destination today.

== Legacy ==
Given the enormous physical difficulties which the surveyors faced in the task, their survey of the Queensland-South Australian border was impressive. Today, Global Positioning System (GPS) can pinpoint place by longitude and latitude more accurately. It is now apparent that the intended corner between Queensland and South Australia at 26 degrees S 138 degrees E was not achieved. The Poeppel Corner post does not correlate with the confluence of 26 degrees South 138 degrees East as was originally intended. However, the Queensland Boundaries Declaratory Act 1982 confirmed "that each land boundary of the State ... as ... defined in the Letters Patent ... by reference to a parallel of latitude or a meridian of longitude is and always has been the boundary ... permanently fixed by marking it upon on the surface of the earth before 1900...".

The corner post as a survey mark is protected under the Survey and Mapping Infrastructure Act 2003 and the Survey and Mapping Infrastructure Regulation 2004 whereby a person must not interfere with a survey mark unless certain conditions are met.

== Heritage listing ==
Poeppel Corner Survey Marker was listed on the Queensland Heritage Register on 9 November 2012 having satisfied the following criteria.

The place is important in demonstrating the evolution or pattern of Queensland's history.

Poeppel Corner (1880), marking the south-western extension of Queensland's border with South Australia, is important in demonstrating the priority placed on clear border demarcation by the governments of Queensland and South Australia. Set borders were an important part of colonial economic and administrative development, providing certainty for governments and pastoralists, and enabling the collection of customs duties.

Poeppel Corner is the result of early cooperation between Australian colonies and provides lasting evidence of the feat of endurance which marking the Queensland-South Australia border involved.

The place is important in demonstrating a high degree of creative or technical achievement at a particular period.

Poeppel Corner represents the culmination of a difficult feat of geodetic surveying and is an early application of this branch of surveying in Queensland.

The place has a strong or special association with a particular community or cultural group for social, cultural or spiritual reasons.

Poeppel Corner is important to the Australian community as a geographical and cultural landmark, and is a well-known tourist attraction.

The place has a special association with the life or work of a particular person, group or organisation of importance in Queensland's history.

Poeppel Corner has an important association with the life and career of Augustus Poeppel (1839–91) and Lawrence Allen Wells (1860–1938), who later surveyed the Queensland-Northern Territory border and whose work contributed to the opening-up of outback Australia for European settlement.
