= Territorial evolution of Australia =

Animated map of the territorial evolution of Australia

The first colonies of the British Empire on the continent of Australia were the penal colony of New South Wales, founded in 1788, and the Swan River Colony (later renamed Western Australia), founded in 1829. Over the next few decades, the colonies of New Zealand, Queensland, South Australia, Van Diemen's Land (later renamed Tasmania), and Victoria were created from New South Wales, as well as an aborted Colony of North Australia. On 1 January 1901, these colonies, excepting New Zealand (who chose not to join), became states in the Commonwealth of Australia. Since federation, the internal borders have remained mostly stable, except for the creation of some territories with limited self-government: the Northern Territory from South Australia, to govern the vast, sparsely populated centre of the country; the split of the Northern Territory into Central Australia and North Australia, and then the quick merger of those back into the Northern Territory; and the Australian Capital Territory, a federal district ceded from New South Wales.

Outside of the continent, Queensland attempted an expansion into New Guinea, but British authorities rejected this; the claim would later be made a British protectorate and ceded to Australia. The League of Nations mandated northeast New Guinea to Australia after World War I, as well as Nauru, which was placed under joint Australian-British-New Zealand jurisdiction. These mandates (and, later, United Nations trust territories) became the independent nations of Nauru and Papua New Guinea in the mid-20th century. Australia has also obtained several small island territories, mainly from earlier British colonies, and has a large claim on Antarctica.

== Table of changes ==
Key to map colours

Australian states
Australian territories and founding colonies
Area changed by event

=== Colonial period ===
Date	Event	Map
25 April 1787	The Colony of New South Wales was created as a penal colony by the Kingdom of Great Britain in Australia east of 135° east. Word of the establishment was proclaimed in Australia by Governor Arthur Phillip on 7 February 1788. The commission included "all the islands adjacent in the Pacific Ocean" within the latitudes of 10°37' south and 43°39' south, which included most of New Zealand.	Map of British claims to Australia; for details, refer to adjacent text
11 July 1810	Macquarie Island was discovered by Frederick Hasselborough, who claimed it for the United Kingdom and declared it part of New South Wales.	Map of British claims to Australia; for details, refer to adjacent text
16 July 1825	New South Wales was extended west to 129° east, so that it would include a trading post set up on Melville Island; and the borders of the "islands adjacent in the Pacific Ocean" were moved north to 39°12' south, now including only a small part of New Zealand.	Map of British claims to Australia; for details, refer to adjacent text
3 December 1825	The southern islands of New South Wales were made the Colony of Van Diemen's Land.	Map of British claims to Australia; for details, refer to adjacent text
2 May 1829	A colony commonly known as the Swan River Colony was founded in the remainder of Australia outside of New South Wales. Most documents calling for the colony's foundation make no mention of a name, apart from its location at the "Port on the Western Coast of New Holland, at the Mouth of the River called 'Swan River', with the adjacent Territory", and that a settlement should be formed "within the Territory of 'Western Australia'". However, the law calling for the creation of the colony does appear to specify that it should be called "Western Australia".	Map of British claims to Australia; for details, refer to adjacent text
6 February 1832	The legal instrument required to formally appoint James Stirling governor of the Colony of Western Australia was proclaimed, and this is commonly held as the date that the Swan River Colony was renamed Western Australia.	Map of British claims to Australia; for details, refer to adjacent text
19 February 1836	The portion of New South Wales between 132° east and 141° east, and south of 26° south, was made the Province of South Australia. The actual landing and proclamation occurred on 28 December 1836. Its border with New South Wales south of the Murray River would be erroneously surveyed roughly 3.6 kilometres (2.2 mi) west of 141° east, and the resulting disputes with the colonies and, later, states that share that border would not be fully resolved until 1914.	Map of British claims to Australia; for details, refer to adjacent text
15 June 1839	The islands of New Zealand were annexed to New South Wales. The action was proclaimed on 14 January 1840.	Map of British claims to Australia; for details, refer to adjacent text
16 November 1840	The Colony of New Zealand was chartered and split from New South Wales.	Map of British claims to Australia; for details, refer to adjacent text
26 September 1844	Norfolk Island was transferred from New South Wales to Van Diemen's Land.	Map of British claims to Australia; for details, refer to adjacent text
17 February 1846	The half of New South Wales north of 26° south was made the Colony of North Australia.	Map of British claims to Australia; for details, refer to adjacent text
28 December 1847	Following a change in government in the United Kingdom, North Australia was merged back in to New South Wales. This is the date Queen Victoria revoked the letters patent establishing North Australia, but it was not proclaimed in Australia until 16 January 1849.	Map of British claims to Australia; for details, refer to adjacent text
1 July 1851	The portion of New South Wales south of the Murray River and a line from the headwaters of the river to Cape Howe was made the Colony of Victoria.	Map of British claims to Australia; for details, refer to adjacent text
1 January 1856	Van Diemen's Land was renamed Tasmania, as a way to get away from its past as a penal colony.	Map of British claims to Australia; for details, refer to adjacent text
1 November 1856	Norfolk Island was split from Tasmania, becoming its own colony. Some sources say this occurred the previous day, but the Norfolk Island Act 1913 states it was on this day.	Map of British claims to Australia; for details, refer to adjacent text
6 June 1859	The portion of New South Wales north of 29° south, the Dumaresq and Macintyre Rivers, and several mountain ridges, and east of 141° east, was made the Colony of Queensland.	Map of British claims to Australia; for details, refer to adjacent text
10 October 1861	The portion of New South Wales west of South Australia was transferred to South Australia by letters patent. The act of parliament was passed on 22 July 1861.	Map of British claims to Australia; for details, refer to adjacent text
13 March 1862	The portion of New South Wales north of South Australia and east of 138° east was transferred to Queensland.	Map of British claims to Australia; for details, refer to adjacent text
6 July 1863	The region of New South Wales north of South Australia was transferred to South Australia.	Map of British claims to Australia; for details, refer to adjacent text
30 May 1872	All islands lying within 60 miles (97 km) of Queensland were annexed to the colony by letters patent. This was done primarily to incorporate the Torres Strait Islands, which were starting to be claimed by New South Wales. It is unknown which specific islands may have already been considered part of Queensland, and the map included with the letters patent contained errors, such as including Melville Island in Queensland.	too vague to map
21 July 1879	The Torres Strait Islands were specifically annexed to Queensland.	Map of British claims to Australia; for details, refer to adjacent text
17 June 1880	Macquarie Island was made a constituent part of the Colony of Tasmania through Letters Patent for the Governor of Tasmania.	Map of British claims to Australia; for details, refer to adjacent text
4 April 1883	Queensland claimed southeast New Guinea as a dependency, though the British government rejected the claim.	Map of British claims to Australia; for details, refer to adjacent text
6 November 1884	The British Empire declared southeast New Guinea as a protectorate, removing it from immediate Queensland control, though the colony still largely administered it.	Map of British claims to Australia; for details, refer to adjacent text

=== Federation ===
Date	Event	Map
1 January 1901	Six colonies of the United Kingdom formed the Commonwealth of Australia: The Colony of New South Wales, becoming the state of New South Wales; The Colony of Queensland, becoming the state of Queensland; The Province of South Australia, becoming the state of South Australia; The Colony of Tasmania, becoming the state of Tasmania; The Colony of Victoria, becoming the state of Victoria; The Colony of Western Australia, becoming the state of Western Australia; Melbourne was used as the location for Parliament until a federal capital could be built. The Colony of New Zealand was originally designated as an eligible founding state in the Constitution, but they ultimately chose not to join the new commonwealth following the recommendation of its own Royal Commission on Federation in 1901.	Map of Australia; for details, refer to adjacent text
18 March 1902	The United Kingdom transferred British New Guinea to Australian control by letters patent.	Map of Australia; for details, refer to adjacent text
1 September 1906	The former British New Guinea was formally organised as the Territory of Papua under the Papua Act 1905.	Map of Australia; for details, refer to adjacent text
1 January 1911	The Federal Capital Territory was split from New South Wales, and the Northern Territory was split from South Australia. While the acts creating it use the term "Territory for the Seat of Government", legislation and proclamations immediately began using the term "Federal Capital Territory."	Map of Australia; for details, refer to adjacent text
1 July 1914	Norfolk Island was transferred from the United Kingdom, becoming the Territory of Norfolk Island.	Map of Australia; for details, refer to adjacent text
4 September 1915	A small peninsula along Jervis Bay was ceded to the Federal Capital Territory by New South Wales.	Map of Australia; for details, refer to adjacent text
17 December 1920	The League of Nations mandated the former German New Guinea to Australia as the Territory of New Guinea and the Mandate of Nauru, with New Zealand and the United Kingdom as co-trustees of Nauru.	Map of Australia; for details, refer to adjacent text
1 February 1927	The Northern Territory was split at 20° south into the territories of Central Australia and North Australia.	Map of Australia; for details, refer to adjacent text
9 May 1927	Parliament began meeting in Canberra, formally moving the capital there from Melbourne.	Map of Australia; for details, refer to adjacent text
12 June 1931	The territories of Central Australia and North Australia were merged to become the Northern Territory.	Map of Australia; for details, refer to adjacent text
10 May 1934	The Ashmore and Cartier Islands were transferred from the United Kingdom and became the Territory of Ashmore and Cartier Islands. A British order-in-council dated 23 July 1931 had stated that the islands would be placed under the authority of the Commonwealth of Australia when Australia passed legislation to accept them.	Map of Australia; for details, refer to adjacent text
24 August 1936	The United Kingdom transferred the portion of its claim to Antarctica between 45° east and 136° east, and 142° east and 160° east, to Australia, where it became the Australian Antarctic Territory.	Map of Australia; for details, refer to adjacent text
29 July 1938	The Territory of Ashmore and Cartier Islands was annexed to the Northern Territory. The Federal Capital Territory was renamed the Australian Capital Territory.	Map of Australia; for details, refer to adjacent text
26 August 1942	The Mandate of Nauru was captured by Japan.	Map of Australia; for details, refer to adjacent text
14 September 1945	The Japanese garrison in the Mandate of Nauru surrendered.	Map of Australia; for details, refer to adjacent text
13 December 1946	The Territory of New Guinea was reconstituted as a United Nations trust territory.	Map of Australia; for details, refer to adjacent text
1 November 1947	The Mandate of Nauru was reconstituted as the United Nations Trust Territory of Nauru.	Map of Australia; for details, refer to adjacent text
26 December 1947	Heard Island and McDonald Islands were transferred from the United Kingdom. The receipt was confirmed in letters exchanged on 19 December 1950.	Map of Australia; for details, refer to adjacent text
1 July 1949	The Territory of New Guinea and Territory of Papua were merged into the Territory of Papua and New Guinea, mainly for administrative purposes; the act makes it clear that the identities of New Guinea as a United Nations Trust Territory and Papua as a possession of the Crown remain intact.	Map of Australia; for details, refer to adjacent text
24 April 1953	Heard Island and McDonald Islands were formally declared the Territory of Heard Island and McDonald Islands.	Map of Australia; for details, refer to adjacent text
23 November 1955	The Cocos (Keeling) Islands were transferred by the United Kingdom from the Colony of Singapore, becoming the Territory of the Cocos (Keeling) Islands.	Map of Australia; for details, refer to adjacent text
1 October 1958	Christmas Island was transferred by the United Kingdom from the Colony of Singapore, becoming the Territory of Christmas Island.	Map of Australia; for details, refer to adjacent text
31 January 1968	The Trust Territory of Nauru became independent as the Republic of Nauru.	Map of Australia; for details, refer to adjacent text
30 September 1969	The Coral Sea Islands Territory was created from Queensland.	Map of Australia; for details, refer to adjacent text
27 December 1971	The Territory of Papua and New Guinea was renamed Papua New Guinea.	Map of Australia; for details, refer to adjacent text
31 December 1973	The peninsula along Jervis Bay belonging to the Australian Capital Territory was formally named the Jervis Bay Territory; at this time, it was still considered part of the ACT.	no change to map
11 September 1975	The Republic of the North Solomons declared the independence of the region surrounding Bougainville Island in Papua New Guinea.	Map of Australia; for details, refer to adjacent text
16 September 1975	Papua New Guinea became independent as the Independent State of Papua New Guinea, rendering the dispute with the Republic of the North Solomons moot.	Map of Australia; for details, refer to adjacent text
1 July 1978	The Ashmore and Cartier Islands were split from the Northern Territory, becoming the Territory of Ashmore and Cartier Islands.	Map of Australia; for details, refer to adjacent text
3 March 1986	The Australia Act 1986 made Australia completely independent of the United Kingdom.	no change to map
11 May 1989	Jervis Bay Territory was split from the Australian Capital Territory to become its own territory.	Map of Australia; for details, refer to adjacent text
7 July 1997	Elizabeth Reef and Middleton Reef were transferred from New South Wales to the Coral Sea Islands Territory.	Map of Australia; for details, refer to adjacent text

== Proposed boundary changes and statehood movements ==
=== Australian Capital Territory ===
In September 2022, it was announced the border between the Australian Capital Territory and New South Wales would change for the first time since it was created in 1911. ACT chief minister Andrew Barr said NSW premier Dominic Perrottet had agreed to a proposed border change for 330 hectares of land.

=== Northern Territory ===
- Northern Territory Statehood

The Northern Territory has periodically reviewed the possibility full statehood. The most recent attempt was the October 1998 statehood referendum, which was narrowly defeated.

Political discussions regarding statehood have continued and several campaigns have been proposed, but full statehood remains unrealised, and many are content with the current arrangement.

== See also ==
- Northern Territory borders
- Proposals for new Australian states
- Queensland borders
- South Australian borders
- States and territories of Australia
- Western Australian borders
