= Surveyor Generals Corner =

Point in Australia where state boundaries meet

Coordinates: 25°59′55″S 129°00′06″E

Australia map with named state corners

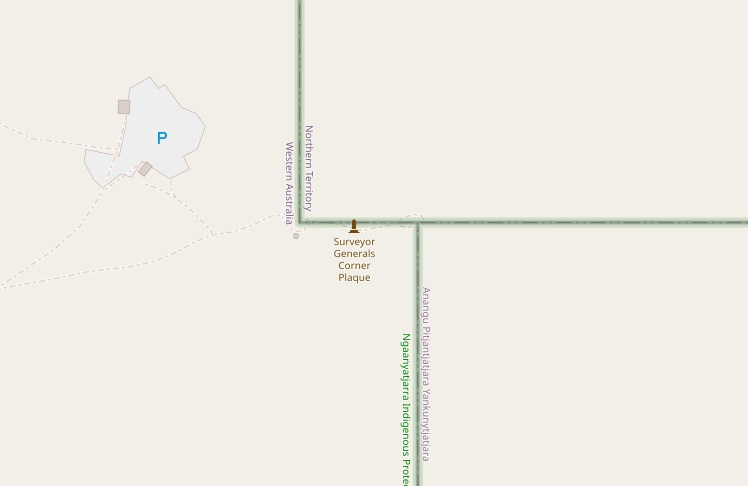
Map of the Surveyor Generals Corner, showing how the two states and Northern Territory meet

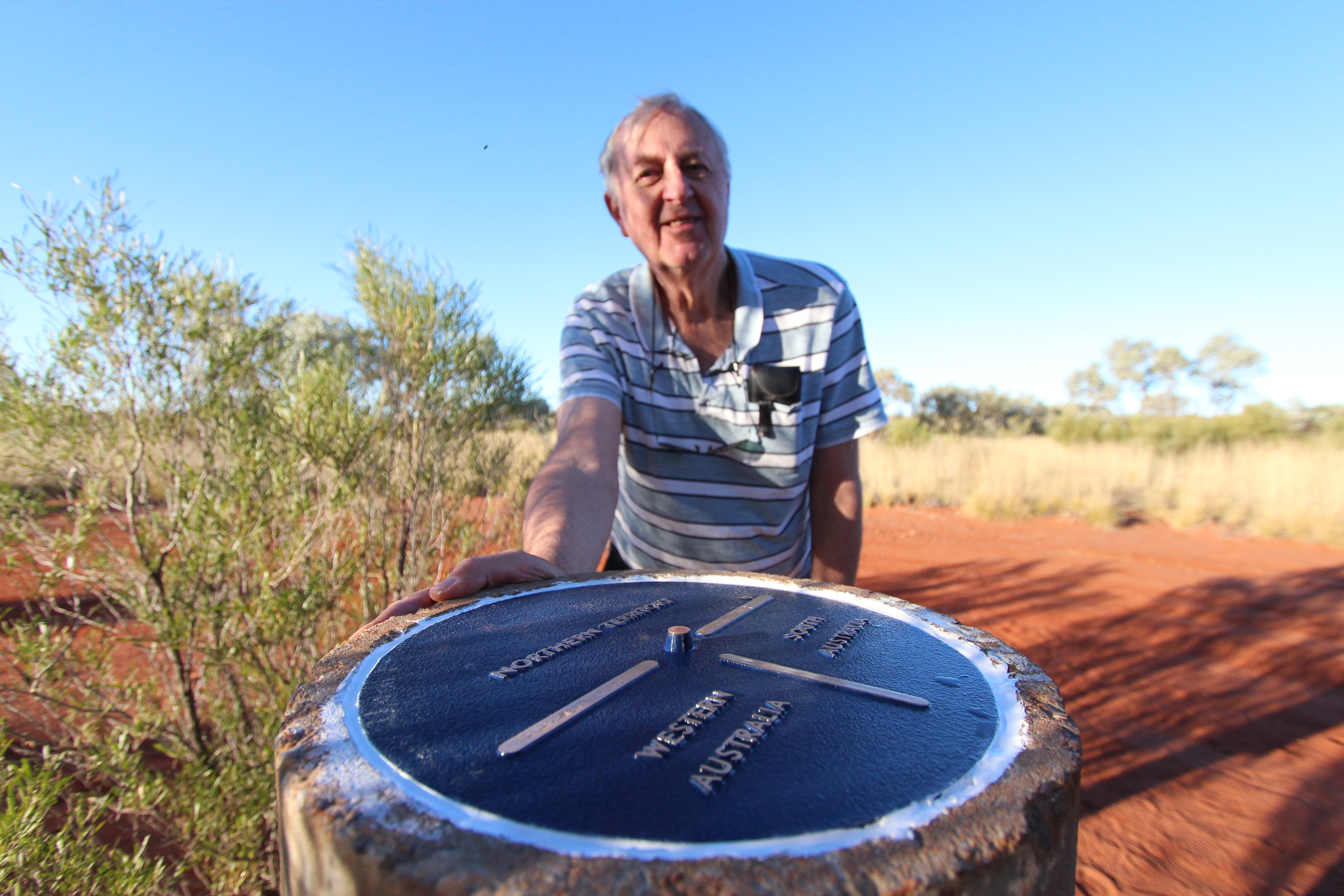
Surveyor Barry Allwright, who originally surveyed the corner in 1968, returned to Surveyor-Generals Corner in June 2018 to replace the plaque.

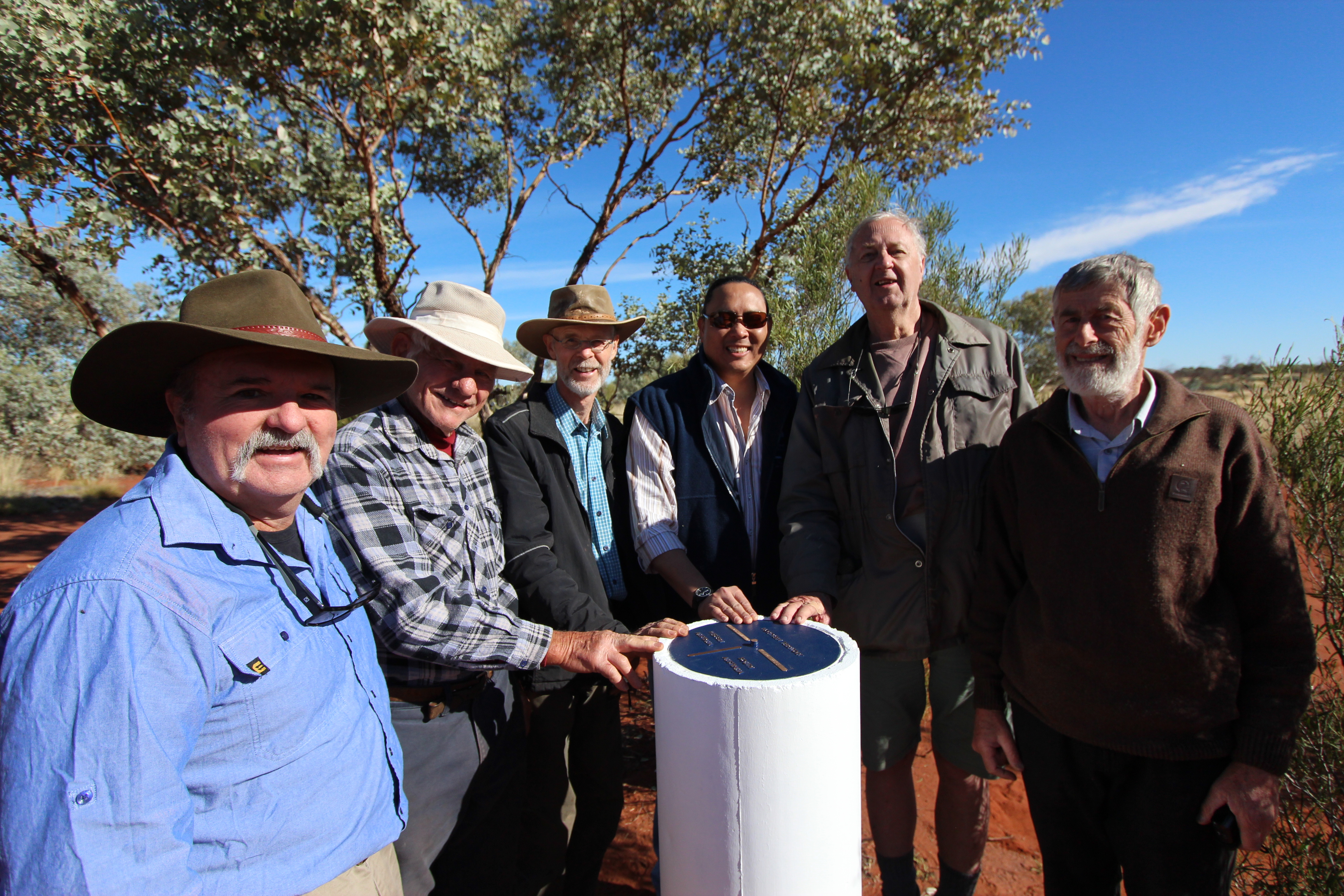
A group of surveyors at Surveyor-Generals Corner in June 2018

Surveyor Generals Corner (or Surveyor-Generals Corner) is the point where the Australian state boundaries of South Australia, Western Australia and the Northern Territory meet.

These boundaries meet at the easternmost point of the approximately 127-metre-long (139 yd) section of the Western Australian border with the Northern Territory border which runs east–west along the 26th parallel south to meet the western boundary of the South Australian border.

== History ==
In 1922 an agreement was signed between the prime minister Billy Hughes, the acting premier for South Australia, John George Bice, and the premier of Western Australia, James Mitchell to set the border along the 129th meridian east longitude and defined the boundary by lines drawn north and south through the centre of the Deakin Obelisk, erected in 1926 near Deakin, Western Australia and the Kimberley Obelisk, erected in 1927, near Argyle Downs, in the Kimberley Region of Western Australia. In 1963, when the survey on the ground was continued, it was realised that there was no possibility of these lines meeting exactly at the 26th parallel south.

In June 1968 two monuments were erected at the junction of the boundaries approximately 127 metres (417 ft) apart running east–west along the 26th parallel south. The most easterly monument common to all three jurisdictions was named Surveyor Generals Corner at the suggestion of the Director of National Mapping. The site is not named after a single Surveyor-General, because there were a number of them present as follows.

On 4th June 1968, two concrete pillars were completed to mark Surveyor-Generals Corner in the presence V.T. O'Brien, Acting Director of Lands, N.T., P.J. Wells, Acting Surveyor-General, N.T.; H.A. Bailey, Surveyor-General, S.A.; Harold Camm, Surveyor-General, W.A.; and B.M. Allwright, Surveyor, N.T.

== Access ==
From 7 March 2003, access to the area was restricted following a decision by the Irrunytju (Wingellina) Community in whose traditional land the Surveyor Generals Corner is situated. Access to the area is limited to guided tours and visitors require a special permit in addition to the standard Great Central Road transit permit.

The nearest settlement is the Aboriginal community of Kalka in South Australia, situated on the Gunbarrel Highway just a few kilometres to the south.

Corners in Australia
Name	Surveyor Generals	Poeppel	Haddon	Cameron	MacCabe
States	WA/NT/SA	NT/SA/Qld	SA/Qld	SA/Qld/NSW	SA/Vic/NSW

== See also ==
- Border corners of Australia
- Surveyor General of South Australia
- Surveyor General of Western Australia
- Department of Lands and Surveys, Western Australia
