= MacCabe Corner =

Point in Australia where state boundaries meet

Coordinates: 34°01′15.57″S 141°0′10.78″E

Australia map with named state corners

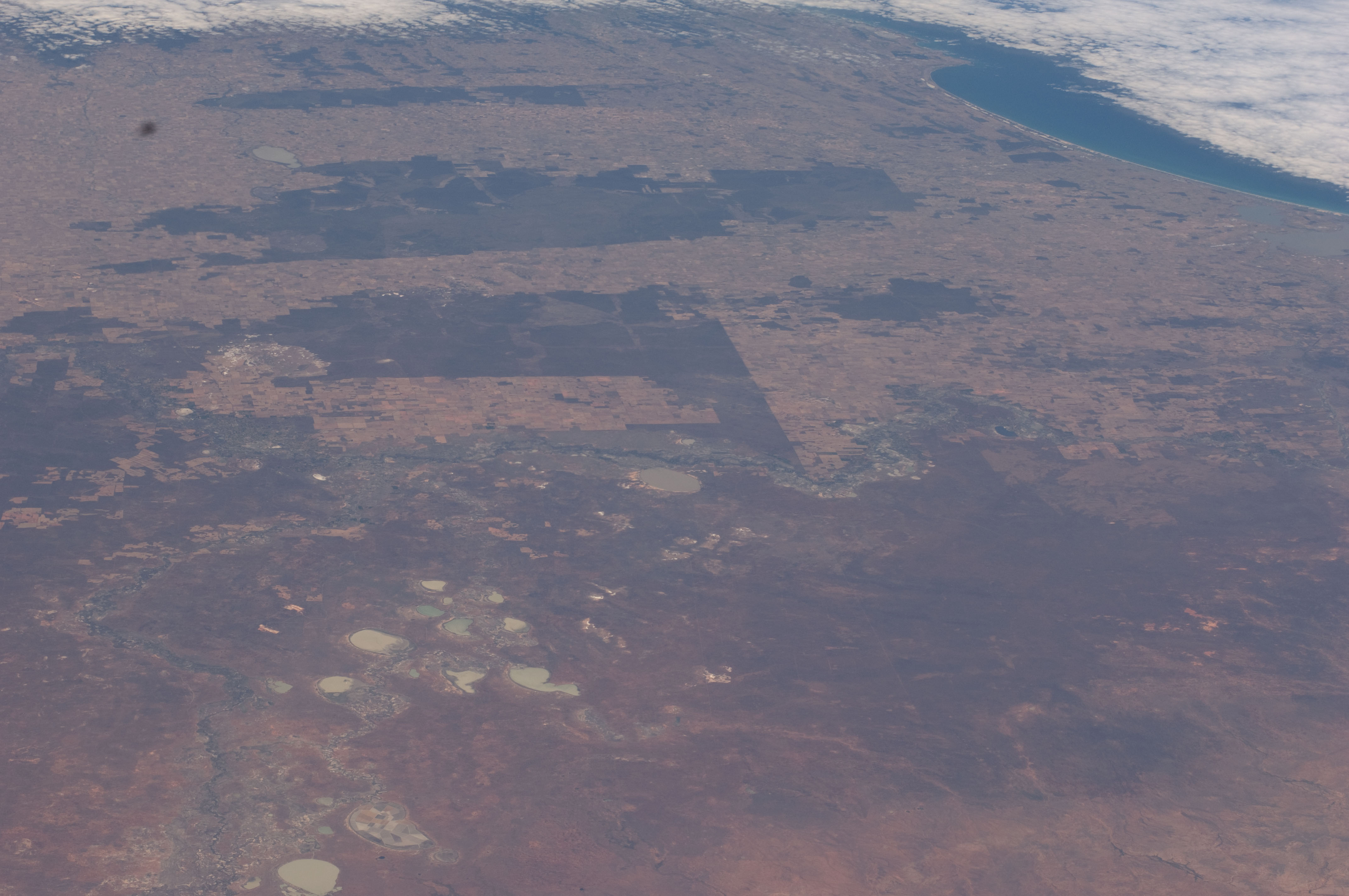
View of MacCabe Corner (red circle) from the International Space Station, facing south. The Victoria–South Australia border is visible as a straight line, with dark uncultivated land in Victoria on the left (east) and light-coloured arable land in South Australia on the right (west). The Murray River runs through the centre. The NSW–SA border (lower part of image) is not visible from the air as both areas are nature reserves. Encounter Bay is at upper right.

MacCabe Corner is the name given to the south-west corner of the state of New South Wales, Australia. It is located 82 kilometres (51 mi) west of the town of Wentworth, New South Wales, on a bend of the Murray River. MacCabe Corner is named for Francis MacCabe, a surveyor who did considerable work exploring and mapping New South Wales, in particular the rivers of the Murray-Darling basin.

== Location ==
MacCabe Corner has been described as the point at which the borders of the state of South Australia, Victoria and New South Wales meet. However the Geographical Names Board of New South Wales places MacCabe Corner at "The junction of the prolongation of the South Australia - New South Wales State border with the southern high bank of the Murray River being the New South Wales - Victoria State border." The boundary between Victoria and South Australia is the mid-line of the river. Thus the precise location of MacCabe Corner is at the south-west corner of New South Wales, approximately 100 metres from the place where the three state borders meet in the waters of the Murray River.

The boundary between New South Wales and Victoria is the top of the left bank (Victorian side) of the Murray River. Although the eastern border of South Australia is notionally the line of 141 degrees east longitude, the borders with the states of New South Wales and Victoria do not line up across the Murray River. The border with Victoria is slightly under 4 kilometres (2.5 mi) west of the true meridian, due to surveying errors when it was first defined. The three state borders meet in the waters of the Murray River approximately 100 metres north of MacCabe Corner as the New South Wales border with Victoria is the top of the left bank of the river, but the South Australia border with Victoria is mid-stream.

Corners in Australia
Name	Surveyor Generals	Poeppel	Haddon	Cameron	MacCabe
States	WA/NT/SA	NT/SA/Qld	SA/Qld	SA/Qld/NSW	SA/Vic/NSW

== See also ==
- Border corners of Australia
- South Australia–Victoria border dispute
