= Border corners of Australia =

Named border corners of Australia

The border corners of Australia are the meeting points of state or territory borders. There are five such points, each recognised with a boundary marker, and all located in remote areas.

The five border corners are:

- Surveyor Generals Corner – WA/NT/SA
- Poeppel Corner – NT/SA/Qld
- Haddon Corner – SA/Qld
- Cameron Corner – SA/Qld/NSW
- MacCabe Corner – SA/Vic/NSW

South Australia’s eastern border was supposed to follow the 141st meridian, but the first surveyors measured incorrectly. A 70-year border dispute followed, and eventually resulted in the disjointedness of MacCabe Corner, with Victoria using the original incorrect calculation, and New South Wales using the new and correct one.
