= 129th meridian east =

Line of longitude

129th meridian east (interactive map)

In Australia the meridian nominally defines the eastern border of Western Australia with the Northern Territory and South Australia.

The meridian 129° east of Greenwich is a line of longitude that extends from the North Pole across the Arctic Ocean, Asia, Australia, the Indian Ocean, the Southern Ocean, and Antarctica to the South Pole.

The 129th meridian east forms a great circle with the 51st meridian west.

In Australia, the meridian nominally defines the eastern border of Western Australia, and the western borders of the Northern Territory and South Australia. However, the border of Western Australia actually meets the Northern Territory border and South Australian border at the 26th parallel south, at what is known as Surveyor Generals Corner.

== From Pole to Pole ==
Starting at the North Pole and heading south to the South Pole, the 129th meridian east passes through:

Co-ordinates	Country, territory or sea	Notes
90°0′N 129°0′E	Arctic Ocean	
77°21′N 129°0′E	Laptev Sea	
73°6′N 129°0′E	Russia	Sakha Republic — islands of the Lena Delta and the mainland Amur Oblast — from 55°30′N 129°0′E
49°27′N 129°0′E	China	Heilongjiang; Jilin — from 43°31′N 129°0′E
42°6′N 129°0′E	North Korea	
40°28′N 129°0′E	Sea of Japan	
37°43′N 129°0′E	South Korea	Passing just west of Busan
35°4′N 129°0′E	East China Sea	Korea Strait — passing just west of the island of Tsushima Island, Nagasaki Prefecture, Japan (at 34°8′N 129°10′E)
32°58′N 129°0′E	Japan	Nagasaki Prefecture — islands of Nakadorijima, Wakamatsujima and Kabajima, Gotō Islands
32°44′N 129°0′E	East China Sea	
28°50′N 129°0′E	Japan	Kagoshima Prefecture — islands of Kaminonejima and Yokoatejima, Tokara Islands
28°47′N 129°0′E	East China Sea	
27°48′N 129°0′E	Japan	Kagoshima Prefecture — island of Tokunoshima
27°41′N 129°0′E	Pacific Ocean	Passing just east of the island of Halmahera, Indonesia (at 0°13′N 128°54′E)
1°55′N 129°0′E	Halmahera Sea	
1°20′S 129°0′E	Ceram Sea	
2°49′S 129°0′E	Indonesia	Island of Seram
3°21′S 129°0′E	Banda Sea	
8°12′S 129°0′E	Indonesia	Island of Sermata
8°16′S 129°0′E	Timor Sea	
14°52′S 129°0′E	Australia	Western Australia / Northern Territory border Western Australia / South Australia border — from 26°0′S 129°0′E
31°41′S 129°0′E	Indian Ocean	Australian authorities consider this to be part of the Southern Ocean
60°0′S 129°0′E	Southern Ocean	
66°59′S 129°0′E	Antarctica	Australian Antarctic Territory, claimed by Australia

== See also ==
- 128th meridian east
- 130th meridian east
