= Haddon Corner =

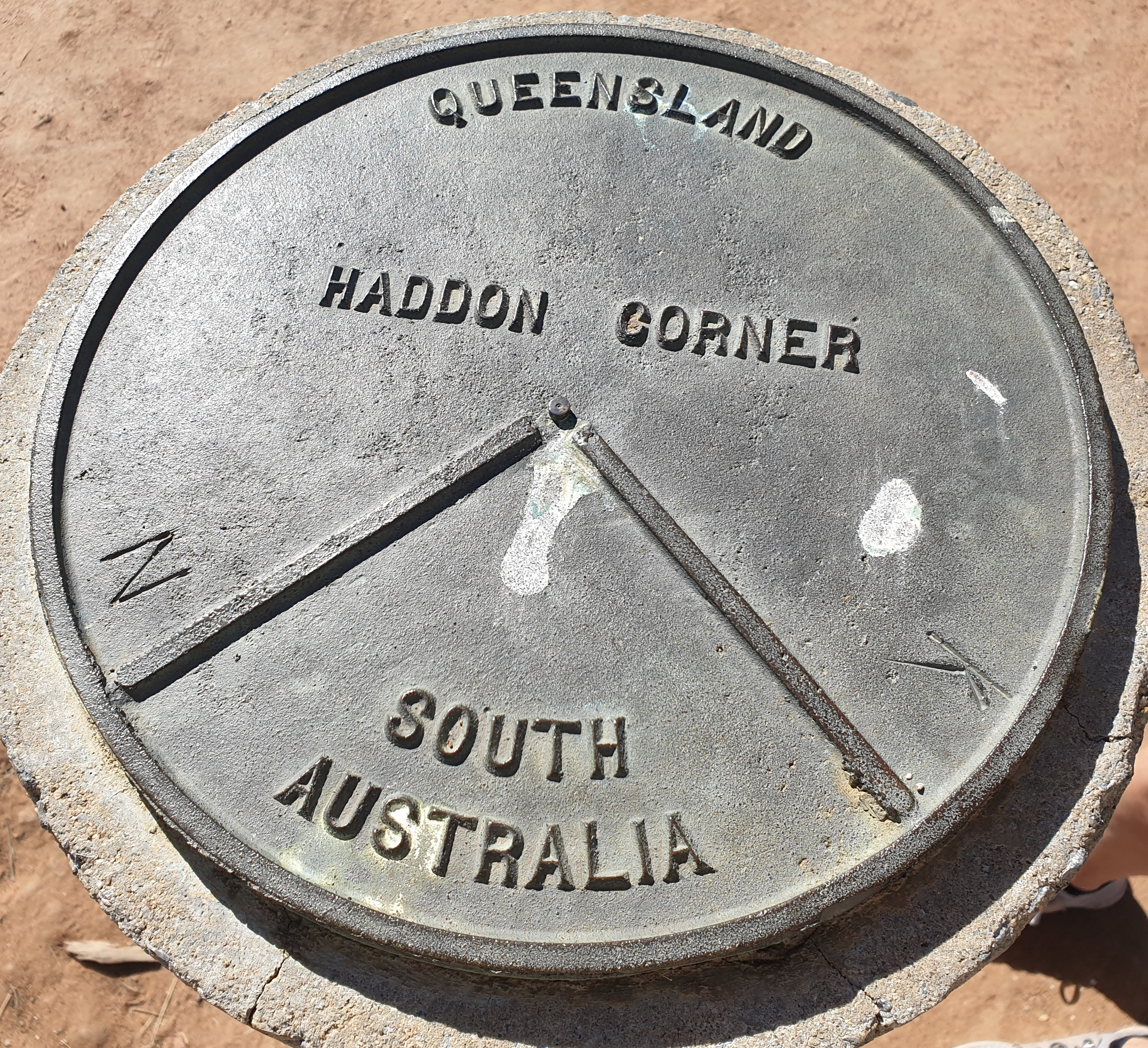
- Survey mark at Haddon Corner, 2019

- Location within Queensland
- 25.9964°S 140.9994°E
- Location: South-West Queensland, on the border corner with South Australia, Tanbar, Shire of Barcoo, Queensland, Australia

History
- Design period: 1870s - 1890s (late 19th century)

Queensland Heritage Register
- Official name: Haddon Corner
- Type: state heritage
- Designated: 9 November 2012
- Reference no.: 602807

Australia map with named state corners

Haddon Corner is a heritage-listed site in Tanbar, Shire of Barcoo, Queensland, Australia. It is in outback Channel Country at South-West Queensland, on the border corner with South Australia. It was added to the Queensland Heritage Register on 9 November 2012.

It was first surveyed by Augustus Poeppel in 1880. Haddon Corner lies at the intersection of the 26th parallel south circle of latitude and the 141st meridian.

== History ==
Karuwali (also known as Garuwali, Dieri) is a language of far western Queensland. The Karuwali language region includes the landscape within the local government boundaries of the Diamantina Shire Council, including the localities of Betoota and Haddon Corner.

Haddon Corner, marked in 1880 during the official survey of the western section of the border between Queensland and South Australia undertaken in 1879–1880, defines the north-eastern corner between Queensland and South Australia. Its marking was a surveying feat of its time.

Letters patent issued by Queen Victoria in June 1859 separated the new Colony of Queensland from New South Wales (NSW). They described Queensland's border as the watershed from Point Danger (28°8"S) west to the Dumaresq River; the Dumaresq, Macintyre and Barwon Rivers to latitude 29 degrees South; and along latitude 29 degrees South to the 141st meridian of East longitude, which was the eastern boundary of South Australia.

Although legal opinion advised that the 141st meridian was the western boundary of Queensland, Surveyor-General Augustus Charles Gregory believed otherwise. In a memorandum of 28 September 1860 he wrote "the western boundary ... appears to be the 141st meridian; but it is probable that it was not described in the Letters Patent erecting the Colony, with greater distinctness, expressly with a view to a future adjustment, when more certain information should have been collected as to the natural features of the country... It is now submitted that the 141st meridian passes through the tract of country known as the "Plains of Promise" and that the Eastern shore [of the Gulf of Carpentaria] possesses no harbours. It would therefore be desirable to adopt the 138th meridian as the boundary; as that line would pass through a barren tract of country, and bring "Investigator's Road' [an anchorage] within the limits of Queensland.'

Furthermore, expeditions in 1861-1862 funded by the South Australian, Victorian and Queensland governments to rescue the missing explorers Burke and Wills, who had failed to return from a journey from Cooper Creek to the Gulf of Carpentaria, led to the exploration of an enormous area of the inland and were predicted to stimulate interest in this previously unknown tract of land beyond Queensland's western boundary. Writing to the Secretary of State for the Colonies on 5 September 1861, the Queensland Governor George Bowen indicated his colony's willingness to protect any settlers so attracted, provided that the western boundary could be extended to include the Gulf. The proposal was accepted on condition that the additional territory could be reclaimed later should another colony be formed in northern Australia.

In response, a despatch dated 14 December 1861 from the Secretary of State for the Colonies advised that the proposed annexation to the 138th Meridian of longitude should be revoked under Act 24 and 25 Victoria, c.44. This immediately provoked a despatch from Sir George Bowen, dated 18 January 1862, stating that Queensland had taken provisional control of this area. Subsequently, on 12 April 1862 Letters Patent were issued describing the accession of "so much of our Colony of New South Wales as lies to the northward of the 26th parallel of south latitude and between the 141st and 138th meridian of east longitude...". Thereby two more corners in Queensland's western boundary were created and the colony acquired part of the Barkly Tableland and the area which later became the Mount Isa mineral field. A revised definition of the extent of Queensland was subsequently proclaimed on 23 June 1862.

In July 1862 Sir Charles Nicholson reported to the Secretary of State for the Colonies that: "On the west, the whole of the basin of the 'Barcoo' for several hundred miles, as far as the 142nd meridian of East longitude, is becoming rapidly occupied by squatters, and the authorised possession of the greater part of it has already, I believe, been secured under pastoral licenses". Pastoralists began settling the Cooper Creek and Bulloo River country and the adjacent portion of South Australia in 1864 with Bulloo Downs Station being the first run in the Bulloo area. By the end of the decade the Cooper country was also settled.

During the 1870s, settlement extended west to the Diamantina, Mulligan and Georgina areas. In 1873, the pastoral districts were named - Gregory South comprised the Bulloo and lower Cooper area and the remainder became Gregory North. Initially runs in both districts were stocked with cattle and sheep. By 1885 all available land in Queensland's far south-west had been claimed. This land, comprising the floodplains of the Mulligan, Georgina, Diamantina and Bulloo Rivers and Cooper Creek, which form part of a vast inland drainage system originating in Queensland's central west and north-west and eventually reaching Lake Eyre, became known as Channel Country. During floods, the semi-arid region becomes a network of channels, watering cattle-fattening grasslands.

Agitation by pastoralists in the Cooper region for surveying of the border because of uncertainty as to its position began in the 1870s. In 1877 James McLeod, the new owner of Cullamurra run, applied to the South Australian Commissioner of Crown Lands to have the colony's border surveyed urgently, after finding himself in dispute with his eastern neighbour John Conrick of Nappa Merrie over their station boundaries.

Another factor in the determination of Queensland's borders was the collection of customs duties at the border and establishment of border customs offices. Inter-colonial border duties were introduced in Australia in the 1850s, after the Murray River became the boundary between New South Wales and Victoria. Their introduction demonstrated that the Australian colonies were developing in divergent and independent ways. As each new colony was declared, it established its own customs administration, which was responsible for the collection of lucrative custom duties and the prevention of smuggling.

As the western regions of the colony developed and internal trade routes were established, custom facilities were required along the borders with New South Wales and South Australia. In mid-1862, the Queensland Government had assented to the provisions of the New South Wales Border Customs Act, introduced to provide for a mutual Queensland-New South Wales system of collecting customs duties payable on goods crossing their shared border. Queensland's Customs Duties Act 1870 provided the colony with independent legislation to regulate the collection of duties on goods imported from other colonies. A small Customs Border Patrol consisting of a police inspector, sub-inspector and four constables was appointed with powers to collect duties from 1 January 1871. They travelled along the Queensland-New South Wales border, collecting duties and keeping careful records regarding the type and value of goods and the amount of monies collected. They also recommended 11 sites suitable for custom offices and these were later established. Those near the South Australian border were at Beetoota, Birdsville and Oontoo.

The marking of the Queensland-South Australian border was undertaken in 1879–1880 by the South Australian Government as the final section of a survey of its border on the 141st meridian, which had started at the Murray River. The surveyor chosen to undertake the border survey was William Barron, who had recently accompanied an expedition to South Australia's western districts. In May 1879 Barron, accompanied by a survey team with horses and camels, set out from Mulligan Springs, 24 kilometres (15 mi) east of Mount Hopeless in north-east South Australia. After checking the border line north to the end of the completed survey at the 29th parallel (Fort Grey), he began working towards the 26th parallel. The work was difficult and tedious, involving trudging over sand ridges and claypans, and marking the line by mileposts recording the distance from the survey starting point at the Murray River. William Barron marked the border from Cameron Corner 90 miles (140 km) north to Cooper Creek, where his health failed and he was forced to return to Adelaide.

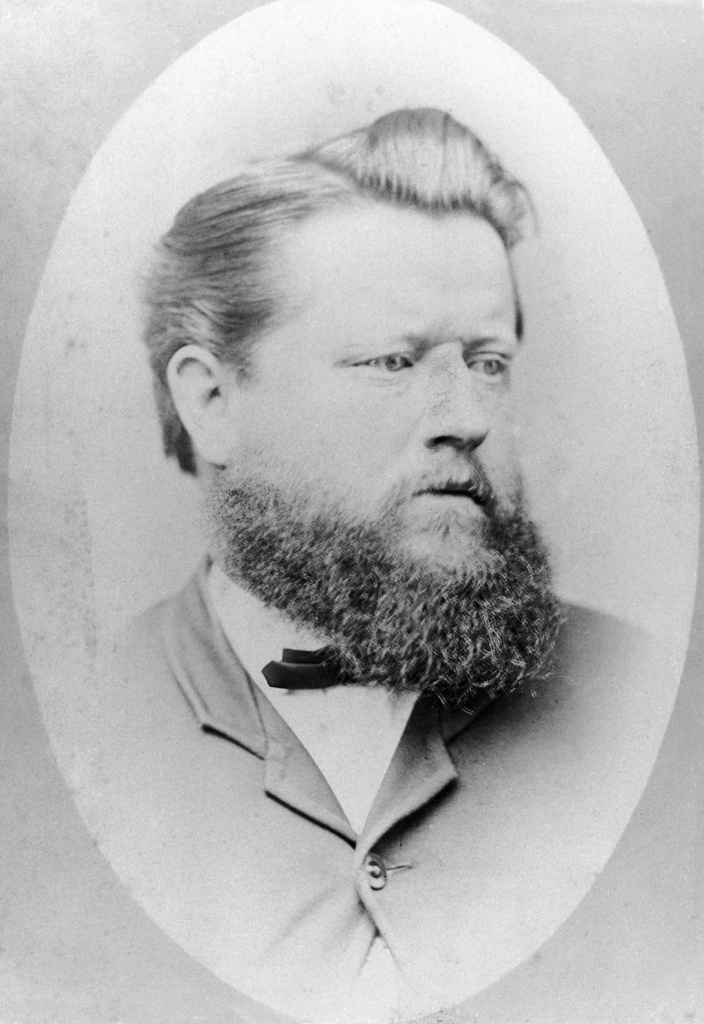
Augustus Poeppel, circa 1880

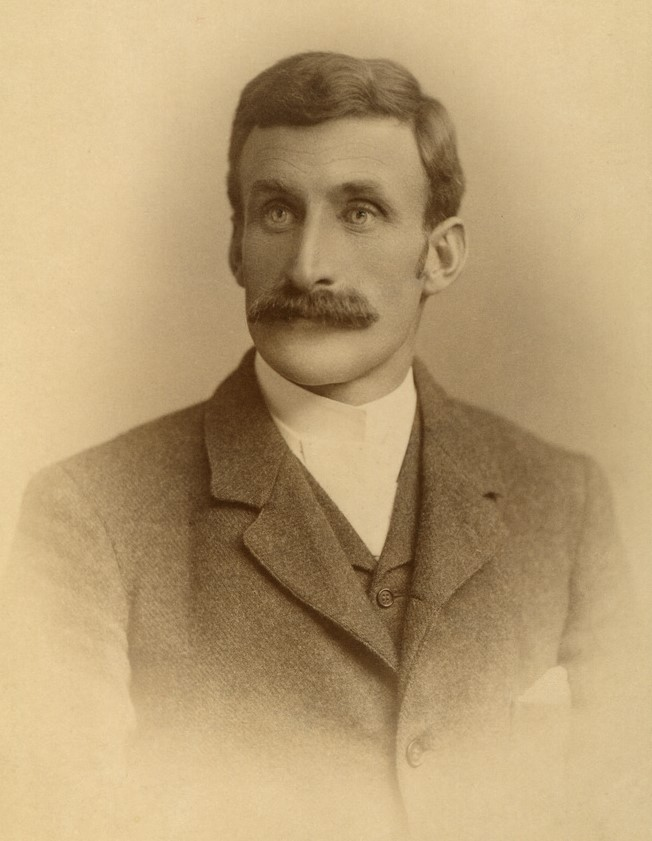
Lawrence Wells, circa 1890

Surveyor Augustus Poeppel took over the survey in January 1880, assisted by Lawrence Allen Wells. Arriving at the survey camp at Innamincka on 3 February 1880, Poeppel spent the following month taking observations and preparing rations and equipment. On 5 March, with two months' rations and the animals in good condition, the survey team returned to work. They continued the line to the 26th parallel where they met their Queensland colleague Alexander Hutchinson Salmond. Together the surveyors took star observations for latitude to fix the position at 26 degrees S and 141 degrees E (now known as Haddon Corner, named after the nearby pastoral lease). The corner was marked with a willow post, 12 feet (3.7 m) long, sunk over an iron bar flanked by rock trenches following the angle. The survey line was marked by mileposts still recording the distance from the surveying starting point at the Murray River.

The party continued on to survey to the next corner at 26 degrees South 138 degrees East.

Augustus Poeppel was born in Hamburg, Germany in 1839, the son of an architect. Emigrating with his family in 1849, he settled in South Australia before moving to Victoria to become a mining surveyor and architect. In 1878, after short periods in New Zealand and Western Australia, Poeppel joined the South Australian Lands Department and was soon appointed to the border surveys. During the Queensland-Northern Territory border survey, from the 142-mile post, he suffered from trachoma and lost 13 kilograms (29 lb) in weight, forcing his withdrawal in July 1885. His health was broken and he later lost sight in one eye. He retired to Melbourne where he died in 1891 aged 52.

Lawrence Wells, born in 1860 in South Australia, entered that colony's Survey Department in 1878. In the following year, at the age of 23, he joined the border surveys, eventually assisting with almost the entire survey of the Queensland-South Australian-Northern Territory borders, which was completed in 1886. Later Wells became a well-known explorer, known as "the last of the great inland explorers". In 1891–1892 he accompanied the Elder Scientific Exploring Expedition, which discovered the East Murchison goldfield; in 1896 he led the Calvert Scientific Exploring Expedition, investigating northern Western Australia; and in 1903 he led South Australia's North-West Prospecting Expedition. Later Wells held administrative positions in the state and federal public services, and was appointed Order of the British Empire in 1937.

Alexander Hutchison Salmond was born in Scotland in 1850. He acquired navigational skills as a cadet in the British merchant navy before arriving with his family in Rockhampton in 1864. His career was spent working in the remote Australian inland. Salmond became a licensed surveyor in 1878 and was based in Cunnamulla until lured to the Western Australian goldfields in the early 1890s. Thereafter he worked in Kalgoorlie and in Carnarvon in the northwest. In 1903 he led an expedition into the Kimberley region and the Salmond River (near Wyndham) is named after him.

Following the completion of the Queensland-South Australian border survey in 1880, there was renewed interest in the land along the border as well-watered country had already been taken. Dependent for its water supplies on a scanty rainfall and the sinking of wells, this land had been ignored in favour of land further west on the Diamantina flood plains. In 1880 William and John Hastie Howie, who already held land on the Queensland side of the border, took up Haddon Downs, the north-eastern corner of South Australia which gave the border corner its name. Haddon Downs is now part of another early holding, Cordillo Downs.

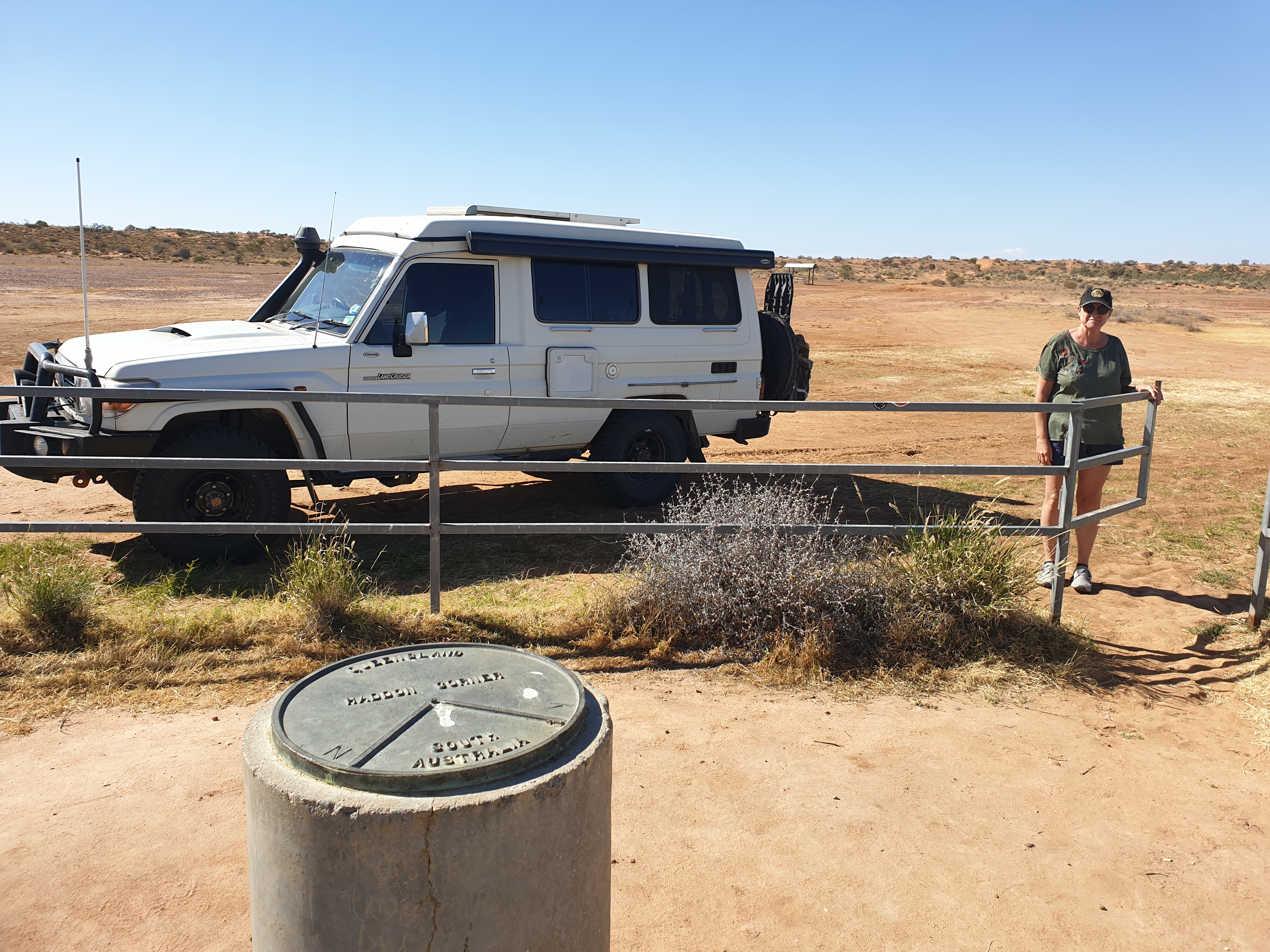
Survey marker on concrete pillar, Haddon Corner, 2019

Given the enormous physical difficulties which the surveyors faced in the task, their survey of the Queensland-South Australian border was impressive. Today, Global Positioning Systems (or GPS) are used pinpoint place by longitude and latitude more accurately, and now it is known that the intended corner between Queensland and South Australia at 26 degrees S 141 degrees E was not completely achieved. However, The Queensland Boundaries Declaratory Act 1982 confirmed "that each land boundary of the State ... as ... defined in the Letters Patent ... by reference to a parallel of latitude or a meridian of longitude is and always has been the boundary ... permanently fixed by marking it upon on the surface of the earth before 1900...". Also the movement of tectonic plates on the earth means that the longitude and latitude of any place on earth may change slowly over time.

The corner post as a survey mark is protected under the Survey and Mapping Infrastructure Act 2003 and the Survey and Mapping Infrastructure Regulation 2004 whereby a person must not interfere with a survey mark unless certain conditions are met.

The original timber corner post has been replaced by a concrete pillar.

Haddon Corner is a well-known tourist destination as of 2014.

Corners in Australia
Name	Surveyor Generals	Poeppel	Haddon	Cameron	MacCabe
States	WA/NT/SA	NT/SA/Qld	SA/Qld	SA/Qld/NSW	SA/Vic/NSW

== Description ==
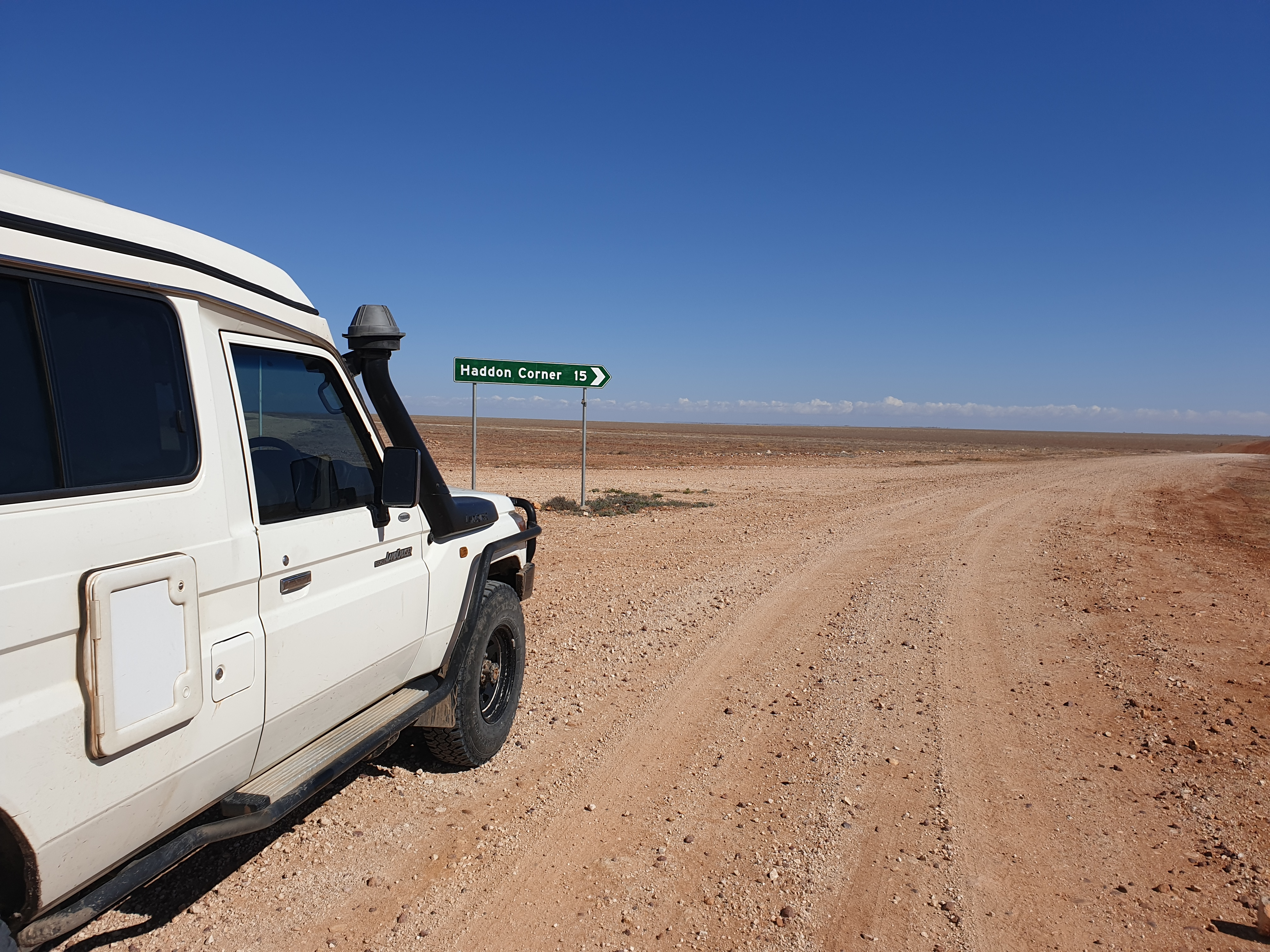
Turn-off to Haddon Corner, 2019

Haddon Corner is in south-western Queensland, adjacent to the Queensland-South Australia border, at the north-eastern corner of South Australia. It is located approximately 335 kilometres (208 mi) north of Cameron Corner and approximately 300 kilometres (190 mi) east of Poeppel Corner. The area is on a gentle divide of poorly coordinated drainage between Cooper Creek (to the east) and the Diamantina River (to the west). The wider region is part of Channel Country. The degree confluence 26 degrees S 141 degrees E (with no official marking) is found several hundred metres mainly south (and a little east) of the Corner post. Like Queensland's other borders, there is discrepancy between the specified latitude or longitude and the border fence or post. Arrabury Road goes from the Birdsville Developmental Road via Haddon Corner and leads to the South Australian town of Innamincka.

== Heritage listing ==
Haddon Corner was listed on the Queensland Heritage Register on 9 November 2012 having satisfied the following criteria.

The place is important in demonstrating the evolution or pattern of Queensland's history.

Haddon Corner (1880), marking the north-eastern extension of the Queensland-South Australia border, is important in demonstrating the priority placed on clear border demarcation by the governments of Queensland and South Australia. Set borders were an important part of colonial economic and administrative development, providing certainty for governments and pastoralists, and enabling the collection of customs duties.

Haddon Corner is the result of early cooperation between Australian colonies and provides lasting evidence of the feat of endurance which marking the Queensland-South Australia border involved.

The place is important in demonstrating a high degree of creative or technical achievement at a particular period.

Haddon Corner represents the culmination of a difficult feat of geodetic surveying and is an early application of this branch of surveying in Queensland.

The place has a strong or special association with a particular community or cultural group for social, cultural or spiritual reasons.

Haddon Corner is important to the Australian community as a geographical and cultural landmark, and is a well-known tourist attraction.

The place has a special association with the life or work of a particular person, group or organisation of importance in Queensland's history.

Haddon Corner has an important association with the life and career of Augustus Poeppel (1839–91) and Lawrence Allen Wells (1860–1938), who later surveyed Poeppel Corner and the Queensland-Northern Territory border.

== See also ==
- Border corners of Australia
- Cameron Corner Survey Marker
- MacCabe Corner
- Poeppel Corner
- Surveyor Generals Corner
- South Australia–Victoria border dispute

Corners in Australia
Name	Surveyor Generals	Poeppel	Haddon	Cameron	MacCabe
States	WA/NT/SA	NT/SA/Qld	SA/Qld	SA/Qld/NSW	SA/Vic/NSW
