= Oontoo, Queensland =

Oontoo
- Town
- Coordinates: 27.6511°S 141.0175°E
- Country: Australia
- State: Queensland
- LGA: Shire of Bulloo
- Location: 346 km (215 mi) W of Thargomindah; 542 km (337 mi) W of Cunnamulla; 836 km (519 mi) W of St George; 1,330 km (830 mi) W of Brisbane

Government
  - State electorate: Warrego
  - Federal division: Maranoa

Oontoo is an abandoned outback town within the locality of Durham in the Shire of Bullo, Queensland, Australia.

== Geography ==
Oontoo is in South West Queensland, immediately east of the border with South Australia.

As at 2025, there are no buildings in the town. The land use is grazing on native vegetation.

== History ==
The township of Oontoo once existed in the area along the banks of the Cooper Creek. The Queensland Government offered approximately 70 town lots for sale on 11 April 1886. A border customs post was established at Oontoo in 1886 on a 1 square mile (259 ha) piece of land resumed from Nappa Merrie cattle station. The post was created to collect taxes from drovers who crossed to Queensland border travelling down Strzelecki Creek.

The first customs officer was Mr Ivory who arrived in 1886 and lived in a tent until a house was completed the following year. In 1887 the post was also used as a depot for materials used in the construction of the rabbit proof fence.

A shanty public house followed soon afterward with a more substantial stone hotel built by Thomas Costello in 1888. The hotel had eight rooms, kitchen, stables and a store. Several race meetings were held in the town starting in 1888. The town soon boasted a store, doctor and school.

Severe flooding occurred in 1891 with Cooper Creek breaking its banks after 4.5 inches (114 mm) of rain fell in the area in January.

By 1897 the population had shrunk to 14.

The customs post was closed in 1902.
