= Poeppel Corner =

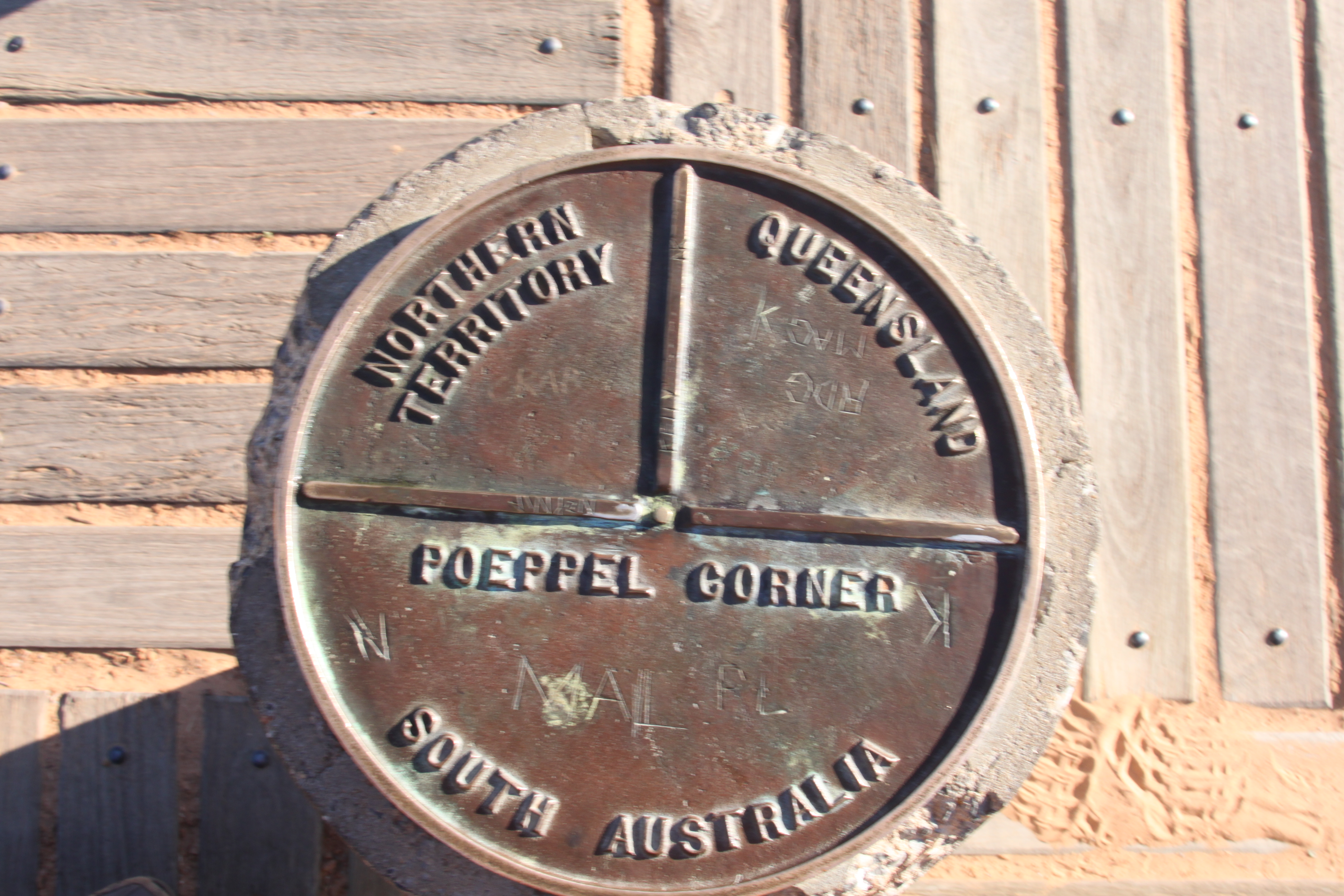
Poeppel Corner Marker, South Australia, Northern Territory, Queensland

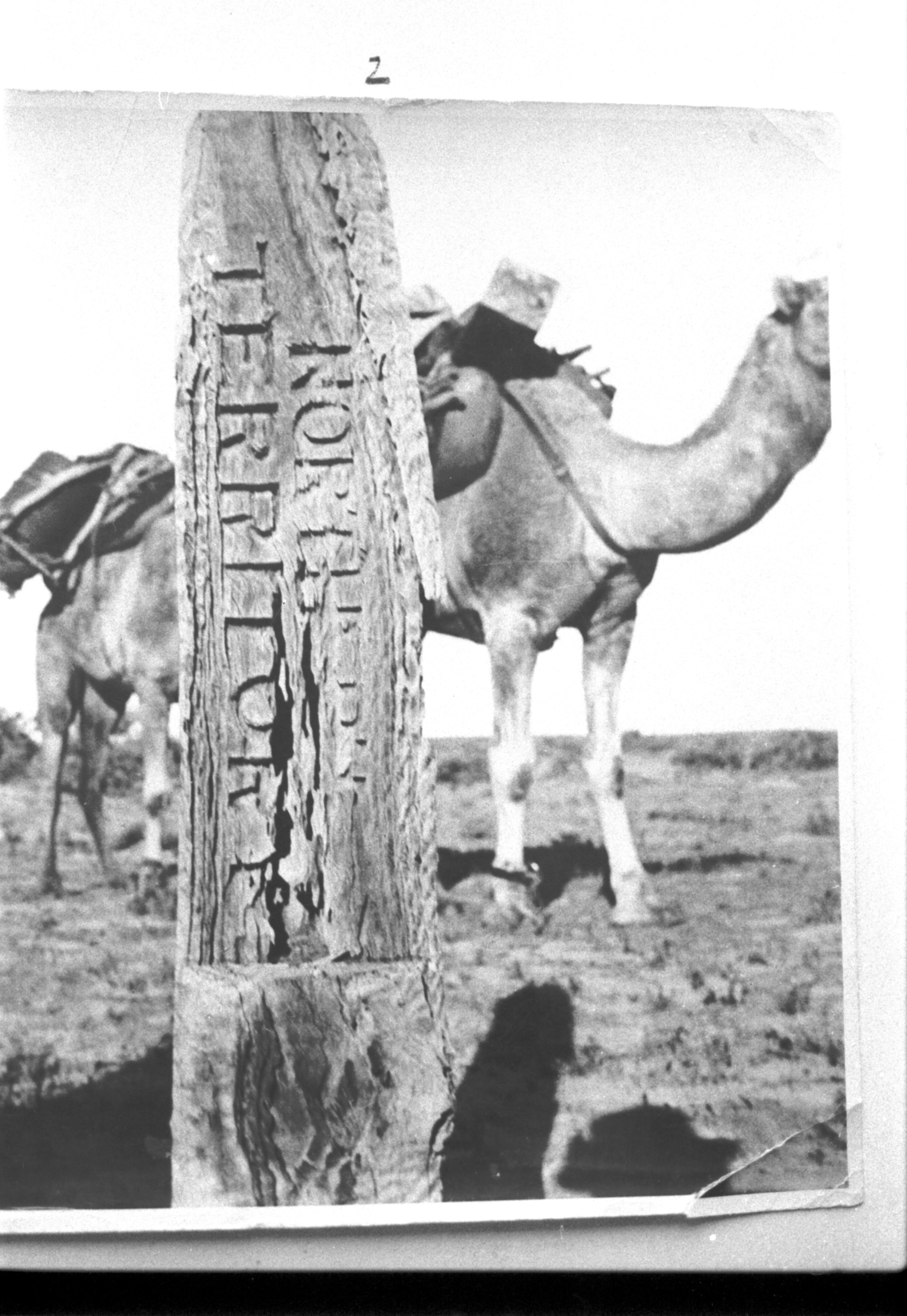
The Poeppel Corner marker, c. 1920s

Poeppel Corner (known as Poeppel's Corner in Queensland) at latitude 26° S and longitude 138° E is a corner of state boundaries in Australia, where the state of Queensland meets South Australia and the Northern Territory.

== Geography ==
Australia map with named state corners

Poeppel Corner is about 174 km west of Birdsville, in the middle of the Simpson Desert.

New Year's Eve occurs three times each year at thirty minute intervals in Poeppel Corner (also in Cameron Corner and Surveyor Generals Corner), because it is at the intersection of three time zones.

== History ==
Augustus Poeppel, after whom the point is named, conducted a survey in the mid-1880s to find the exact location of the central Australian colonial borders. His team used camels to drag a coolibah post to mark the intersection. Originally the point was located in a salt lake, but it was found that the measuring chain used was a few centimetres too long. Another survey was conducted by Lawrence Wells, who relocated the post to its current position.

== Tourism ==
As with the other three corners it is a destination for four-wheel-drive tourists.

== Heritage listing ==
The Poeppel Corner Survey Marker is a heritage-listed site, having been added to the Queensland Heritage Register in 2012.

Corners in Australia
Name	Surveyor Generals	Poeppel	Haddon	Cameron	MacCabe
States	WA/NT/SA	NT/SA/Qld	SA/Qld	SA/Qld/NSW	SA/Vic/NSW

== See also ==
- Border corners of Australia
- Cameron Corner Survey Marker
- Haddon Corner
- MacCabe Corner
- Surveyor Generals Corner
- Geography of Australia
