= South Australia–Victoria border dispute =

Australian political dispute

The border between the Australian states of South Australia and Victoria was established in 1836 by imperial letters patent "as the 141st degree meridian of longitude east of Greenwich". In 1836 the land in what is now called Victoria was part of the colony of New South Wales, the original Victorian border was drawn between the colonies of South Australia and New South Wales. An error came about in establishing the position of the 141st meridian, and more than 75 years and a protracted legal dispute passed before the precise placement of the border was settled, resulting in the forfeiture of more than 1,300 km^{2} (500 sq mi) of territory from South Australia to Victoria.

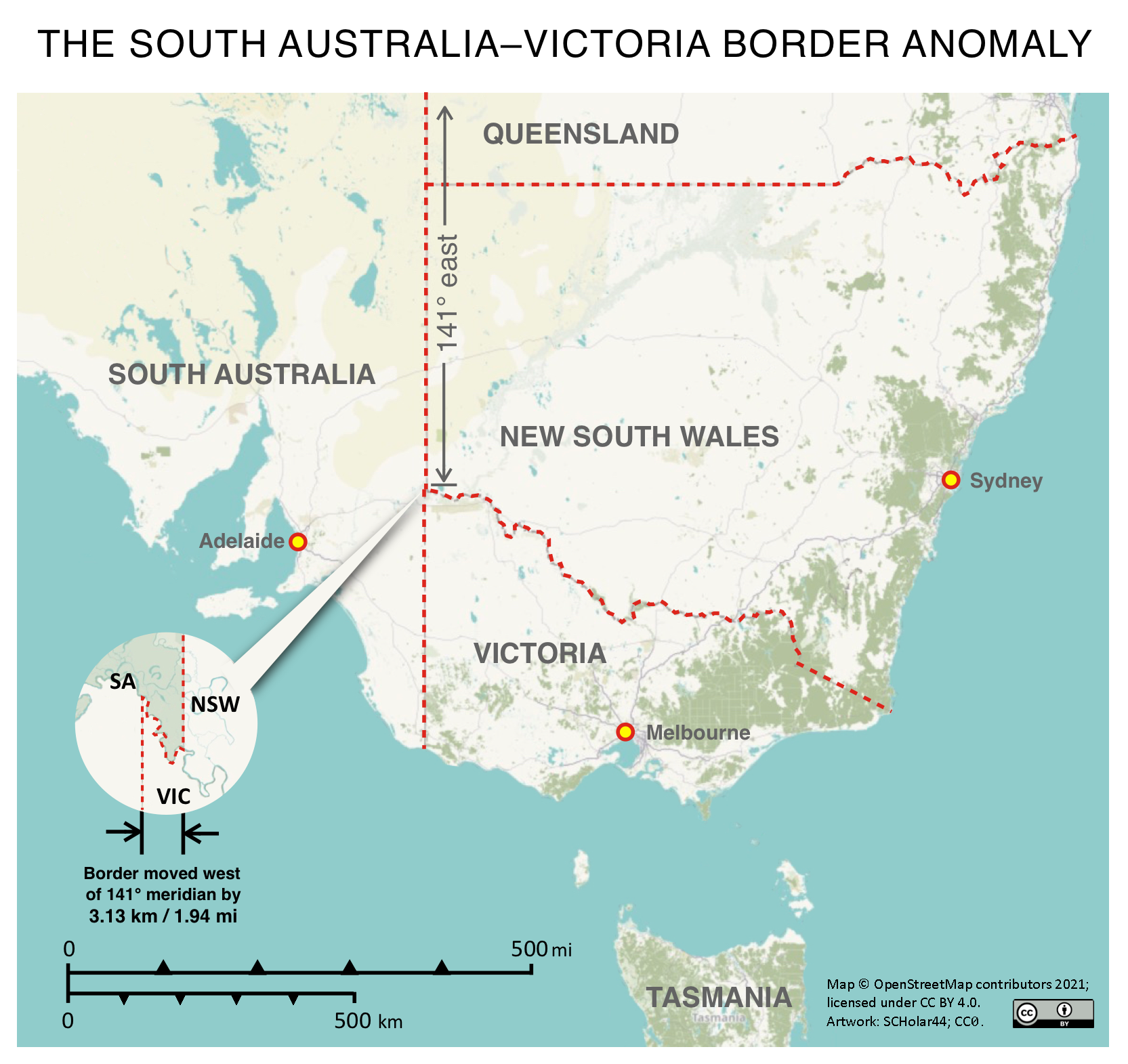

== Tyers survey ==
In 1839 Charles Tyers was transferred from the Royal Navy to the Colonial Service and instructed by Sir George Gipps, the Governor of New South Wales, to ascertain the precise longitude at the mouth of the Glenelg River so that a distance to the 141st meridian (the eastern border of South Australia) could be measured.

Several months later, Tyers completed a survey from Melbourne to the Glenelg River and on an expanse of sandy beach he formed a broad arrow with limestone rocks. This became known as Tyers' Mark and was used to determine the starting point for the border survey. Due primarily to inadequate equipment, this was later determined to be 2 miles and 4 chains (3.3 km) in error.

Following the proclamation of government in the province of South Australia in 1836, the region between the coast and the Murray River was rapidly being settled by Europeans through squatters selecting large runs for sheep grazing. With no clear border, legal oversight was impossible; an accurate position needed to be defined. The earliest relevant reference to the boundary of South Australia was in a despatch dated 30 September 1844 from the South Australian governor, George Grey to the British Secretary of State for War and the Colonies, Lord Stanley. Grey stated that it would be extremely difficult to determine with accuracy a number of points on the Earth's surface through which the 141st degree of east longitude passes, and pointed out that in addition to that difficulty there would be attendant expense.

== Wade–White surveys ==
For several years following Tyers' survey no action was taken to extend his work but by 1845 the need to have the boundary line defined on the ground had become urgent, particularly to the east of Mount Gambier. South Australian pastoralists had worked their way east from the coast and there were disputes when they met pastoralists from the Wimmera country pushing their way westwards with flocks of sheep.

There was uncertainty as to which Government should grant pastoral licenses to the squatters and which had legal control. In November 1846 the Colonial Secretary's Office directed surveyor Henry Wade to proceed from Sydney to the disputed territory to define a "Boundary for Police Purposes".

By March 1847 Wade had got his party of seven and equipment at the mouth of the Glenelg River. He was joined by assistant surveyor Edward White who had been appointed by the South Australian government to act as an observer on its behalf.

After much deprivation and hardship due to drought and reluctance by his men to continue with poor work conditions, Wade was still 155 miles (250 km) from the Murray River after nine months of swamp, sand dunes and broken equipment. The expedition collapsed at the 36th parallel of latitude. On 16 December 1847 the South Australian Government published a proclamation that the "line as marked on the ground" by Wade should be "deemed and construed" to be the eastern boundary of South Australia. In March 1849, New South Wales issued a proclamation in similar terms. Wade died in 1854.

As the survey was only partially completed the two colonies were in agreement that surveyor White should complete Wade's line to the Murray River as soon as possible. This was doubly urgent as the colony of Victoria was to be proclaimed within twelve months further complicating legal and later political matters.

In August 1849 the extension from Wade's line was begun. White and his party of five were similarly troubled by the severe nature of the Big Desert mallee country: where there was little water in 1847 there was none two years later. Within two weeks mutinous men had deserted him and two of his three horses collapsed from being without water for four days. White led the other until it also lay down, he himself was also on the verge of collapse but he managed to bleed the horse and drink half a pint of the blood. Lost, he did not know how far from the Murray River he was but he managed to stagger on for about two miles (3.2 km) to find himself on the riverbank at the border of three states and the survey completed. After drinking and resting he retreated back to the dead horses and collecting his saddle and bridle he returned to the river, managed to cross it and borrow a horse at Chowilla sheep station. He rode 180 miles (290 km) to Adelaide and filed a report on the survey. White died three years later.

== Smalley and Todd survey ==
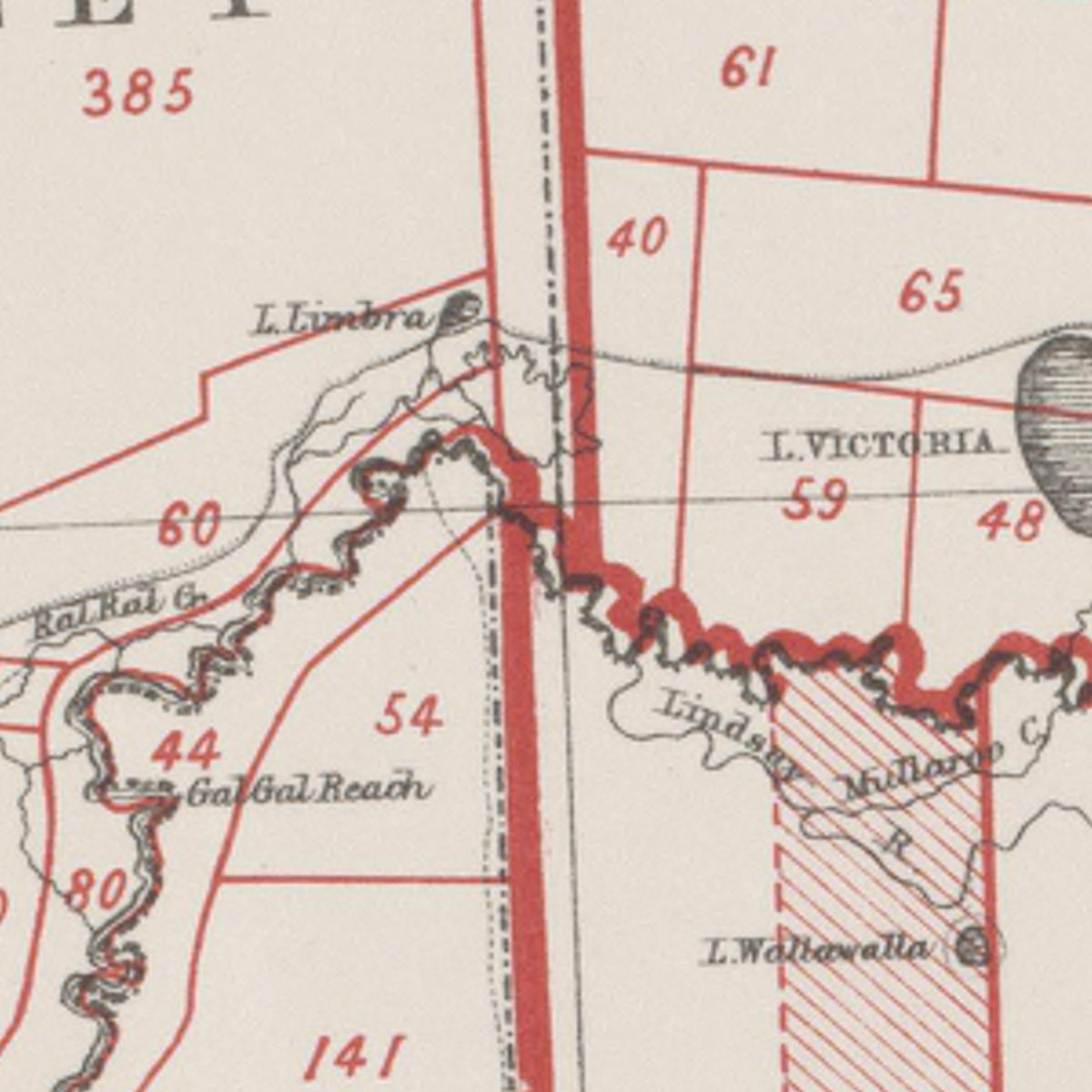
The border between Victoria, South Australia and New South Wales, as marked on an 1883 map showing Victoria's western border is further to the west than that of New South Wales.

Doubts as to the accuracy of the Wade-White line grew with the availability of better astronomical equipment and the advent of the telegraph. As a result of appointments of Government Astronomers in Sydney and Melbourne there were far more precise values for the longitudes of these places and hence the 141st longitude of the legal border.

By agreement, an expedition left Adelaide in April 1868 for Chowilla near the Murray River and the border. It was led by George Smalley, N.S.W. Government Astronomer and Charles Todd South Australian Superintendent of Telegraphs. The purpose was to make transit observations of eleven stars whilst similar observations were made in Melbourne and Sydney. Whilst Tyers had used a small three inch (76 mm) theodolite, this expedition had a 45-inch (1,100 mm) telescope, the largest available portable device in Australia at the time. The site of the transit observations near the border was temporarily linked to the Adelaide-Sydney telegraph line, allowing the precise time of the transit observations to be transmitted instantaneously to Sydney, where these were recorded against the Sydney Observatory's chronograph.

As a result of their observations Smalley and Todd declared the new 141st meridian. This led to the discovery that the proclaimed border on the ground was at least two miles and 19 chains (3.6 km) to the west of the more accurate measurement of the 141st meridian. A new border between New South Wales and South Australia on the newly verified 141st meridian line, was jointly accepted by Smalley, on behalf of the New South Wales Government, and Todd, on behalf of the South Australian Government, and new N.S.W.- S.A border markers were set in place. This border realignment had other implications, as the 141st meridian also forms part of the Queensland-South Australian border (between what is now Cameron Corner and Haddon Corner) and the original Victoria-S.A. border had been supposed to lie on the same meridian. The survey of the Queensland-S.A. border had not yet taken place and, when it was done, used the actual 141st meridian. However, despite the involvement of the Melbourne Observatory in the astronomical work, Victoria was not a party to the agreement, between South Australia and New South Wales, and did not agree to a corresponding realignment of its border with South Australia.

The "Disputed Territory" as it was termed between the surveyed border and the actual 141st meridian contained over 500 square miles (1295 km^{2}) of land. By 1849, 47% of it had already been sold freehold or leased out by the Victorian Government. If the more accurate border had been adopted, Victoria would not have owned the land to be able to sell or lease it. This was the beginning of the battle of the Disputed Territory, a bone of contention which was to last for more than forty years.

== Legal dispute ==
The South Australian Government did not let the matter rest. In 1874 it suggested the value of the land was about £800,000. Between 1883 and 1893 South Australia sent more than 70 letters or telegrams to Melbourne seeking Victorian relinquishment or financial redress. There were many futile conferences. The nearest to an agreement between the two states was in 1908. Then it was decided, subject to ratification by Parliament, that £215,000 should be regarded as compensation to South Australia. Parliament did not ratify the proposal, nor did anything come of the 1909 South Australian premier's plan to send surveyors to subdivide some of the land on the east of White's marked border, the last "legally proclaimed" border.

South Australia finally abandoned all hope of settlement, due to Victoria's intransigence, and in 1911 it sued in the original jurisdiction of the High Court only to have its suit dismissed. In 1914, it resorted to an appeal to the Judicial Committee of the Privy Council which ruled in favour of Victoria.

== Serviceton ==
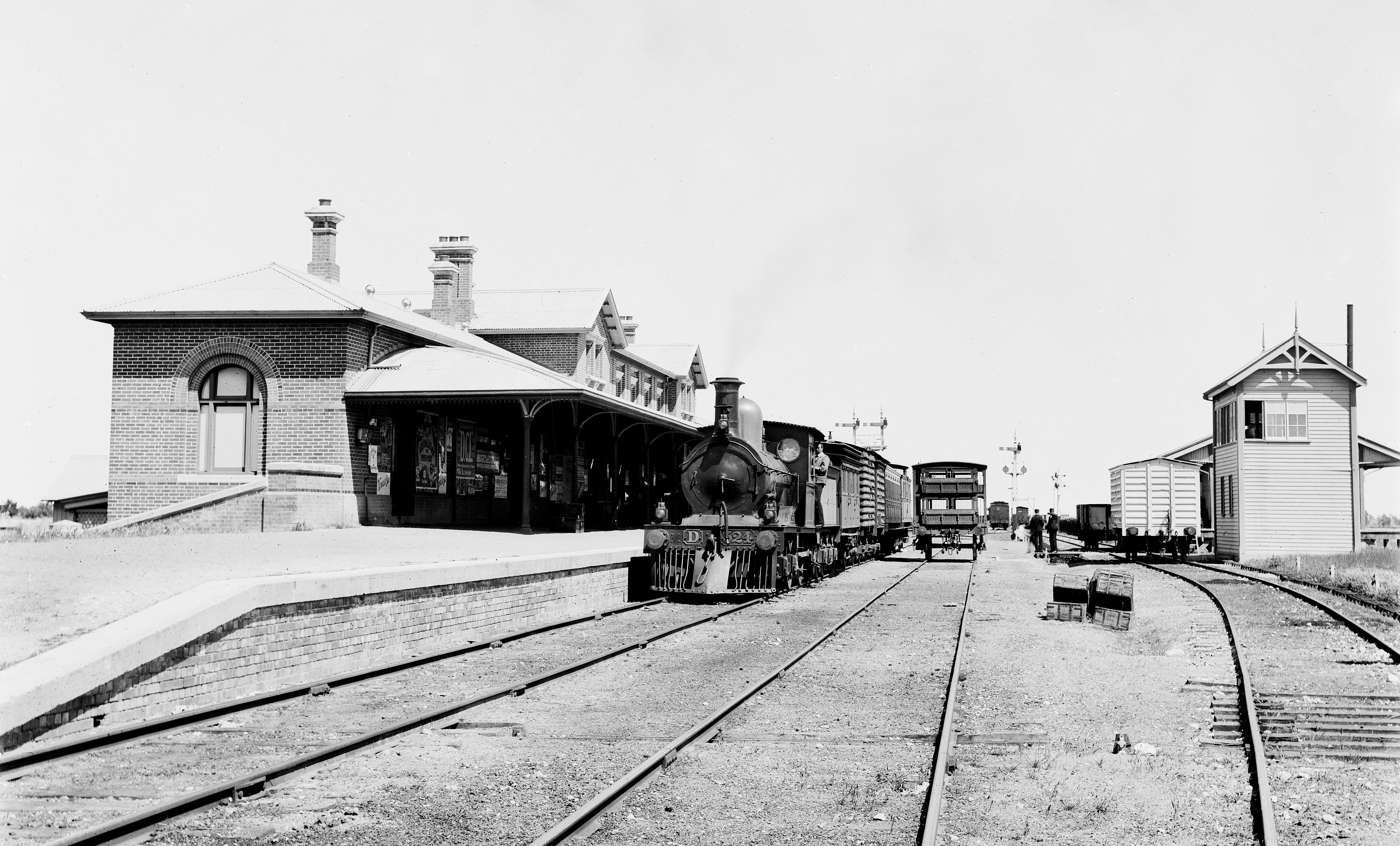
A Victorian Railways mixed train at Serviceton station in the 1910s, about the time the 75-year border dispute was resolved

When the railway line was built from Melbourne to Adelaide, Serviceton station was built in the disputed territory and paid for equally by both governments to provide a place for the exchange of locomotives and crews. While the station is no longer used, the building remains in the tiny town of Serviceton.

== See also ==
- Port Phillip District
