= North Australia =

Former administrative regions of Australia

North Australia is the name of two distinct entities in Australian history. The first was a British colony, authorised by letters patent in 1846 and intended as a new penal colony at Port Curtis, but never established; the letters patent were revoked before any colonial administration took office. The second was an administrative territory of the Northern Territory of Australia, created on 1 February 1927 under the Northern Australia Act 1926 and abolished on 12 June 1931.

The two entities had no connection to one another other than the name. The 1846 colony was a British colonial project; the 1927 territory was a Commonwealth administrative division.

== Colony (1846–1847) ==
North Australia
- Colony of New South Wales of United Kingdom
- 1847–1846
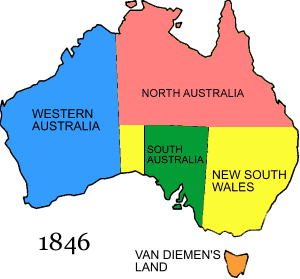
- Map showing the proposed Colony of North Australia (1846)
- Capital: Port Curtis (proposed)
- Area
  - Coordinates: 20°48′S 139°31′E
- Government
  - Type: Proclaimed Crown colony (never established)
- Lieutenant-Governor
  - 1846–1847: George Barney
- History
  - Letters patent issued: 17 February 1846
  - Proclaimed: 30 January 1847
  - Letters patent revoked: 11 December 1846
Preceded by	Succeeded by
Colony of New South Wales	Colony of New South Wales
- Today part of: Northern Territory and Queensland

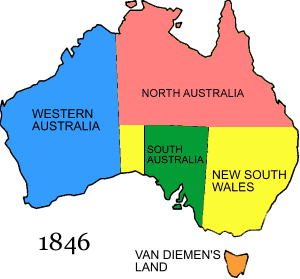

A colony of North Australia was briefly authorised by the British government by letters patent of 17 February 1846, but was never established. The colony was to comprise that part of the Colony of New South Wales that is now the Northern Territory of Australia and that part of the state of Queensland lying north of the 26th parallel. The colony was intended as a new penal colony after the end of transportation to the existing Australian colonies.

Since 1822, when John Bigge recommended the establishment of a convict settlement at Port Curtis (now the location of Gladstone, Queensland), the idea had been revived several times. As some difficulty was being experienced in finding work for time-expired convicts in Van Diemen's Land (Tasmania), it was decided to send them to a new area and give them land and a certain amount of government help. Edward Smith-Stanley, 14th Earl of Derby and William Ewart Gladstone, successive secretaries of state for the colonies, fathered the project.

Charles Augustus FitzRoy, the Governor of New South Wales, was to be the Governor and, in May 1846, Colonel George Barney was appointed to be Lieutenant-Governor and Superintendent. Gladstone selected Barney as a man used to authority and with previous experience in Australia. Barney was dispatched and arrived in Sydney on 15 September 1846 on the William Hyde. He quickly surveyed the coast in a small steamer, decided that Port Curtis was the most suitable place for a settlement and returned to Sydney.

After a change of government ministries in Britain, Henry Grey, 3rd Earl Grey succeeded Gladstone and promptly vetoed the whole project. The letters patent authorising the colony were revoked on 11 December 1846.

Report of the revocation did not reach Australia and Barney until 15 April 1847. On 8 January 1847, Barney, his family, various officials and 87 soldiers and convicts sailed on the chartered barque Lord Auckland. The ship arrived off the southern entrance of Port Curtis and ran aground on shoals off the southern tip of Facing Island. On 30 January 1847, the (already revoked) colony of North Australia was proclaimed at Settlement Point on Facing Island and Barney was sworn in as Lieutenant Governor. The settlers spent seven weeks on Facing Island before being rescued by the supply ship Thomas Lowry and delivered to the intended site of settlement, the region now known as Barney Point. There was much discomfort from the extreme summer heat. News of the revocation of the colony reached Barney and the party returned to Sydney. The convict settlement lasted barely two months and cost the British government £15,000.

The colony's intended role as a convict penal settlement attracted much criticism in the New South Wales Legislative Council.

== Territory (1927–1931) ==
North Australia
- Territory of Australia
- 1927–1931
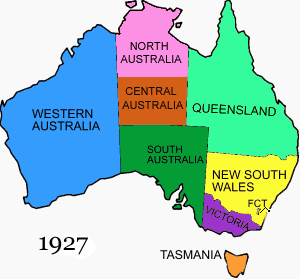
- A map of Australia from 1927 to 1931, with North Australia in the north
- Capital: Darwin
- Area
  - Coordinates: 16°37′S 133°15′E
- Government
  - Type: Directly administered federal territory
- Government Resident
  - 1927–1931: Robert Hunter Weddell
- History
  - Established: 1 February 1927
  - Disestablished: 12 June 1931
Preceded by	Succeeded by
Northern Territory	Northern Territory
- Today part of: Northern Territory

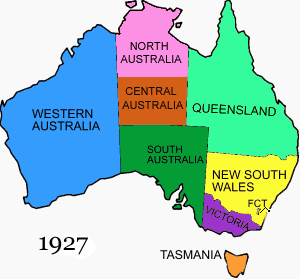

North Australia was a short-lived administrative area of the Northern Territory of Australia. George Pearce, Minister for Home and Territories in the federal government in the 1920s, thought that the Northern Territory of Australia was too large, sparsely populated and disparate to be adequately administered as a whole. On 1 February 1927, under the Northern Australia Act 1926 (Cth), administration of the Northern Territory was split into two administrative areas, North Australia and Central Australia, respectively above and below latitude 20° S.

Each territory was administered by a Government Resident. The Government Resident of North Australia was based in Darwin; the Government Resident of Central Australia was based at Stuart (now Alice Springs). Each was assisted by a half-elected Advisory Council of four members. Ordinances of the Northern Territory continued in force in both territories, which maintained a common non-voting representative to the Australian House of Representatives.

The Act also created the North Australia Commission, which was responsible for preparing plans for the development of North Australia and making recommendations to Parliament. The Commission operated only in North Australia; development of Central Australia remained with the responsible minister. The Commission cost £27,500 a year to function and was criticised as an extravagance interested in the pastoral industry over local whites. The Great Depression starting in late 1929 increased opposition to the body, which was abolished by legislation in 1930.

The Northern Territory (Administration) Act 1931 repealed the Northern Australia Act 1926 and returned development of the Northern Territory to the federal government. The territory of North Australia was disestablished on 12 June 1931, when administration of the Northern Territory reverted to a single area.

== See also ==
- Northern Australia
- History of Australia
- Central Australia
- Central Australia (territory)
- States and territories of Australia
- Territorial evolution of Australia
- Proposals for new Australian states
