= 141st meridian east =

Line of longitude

141st meridian east (interactive map)

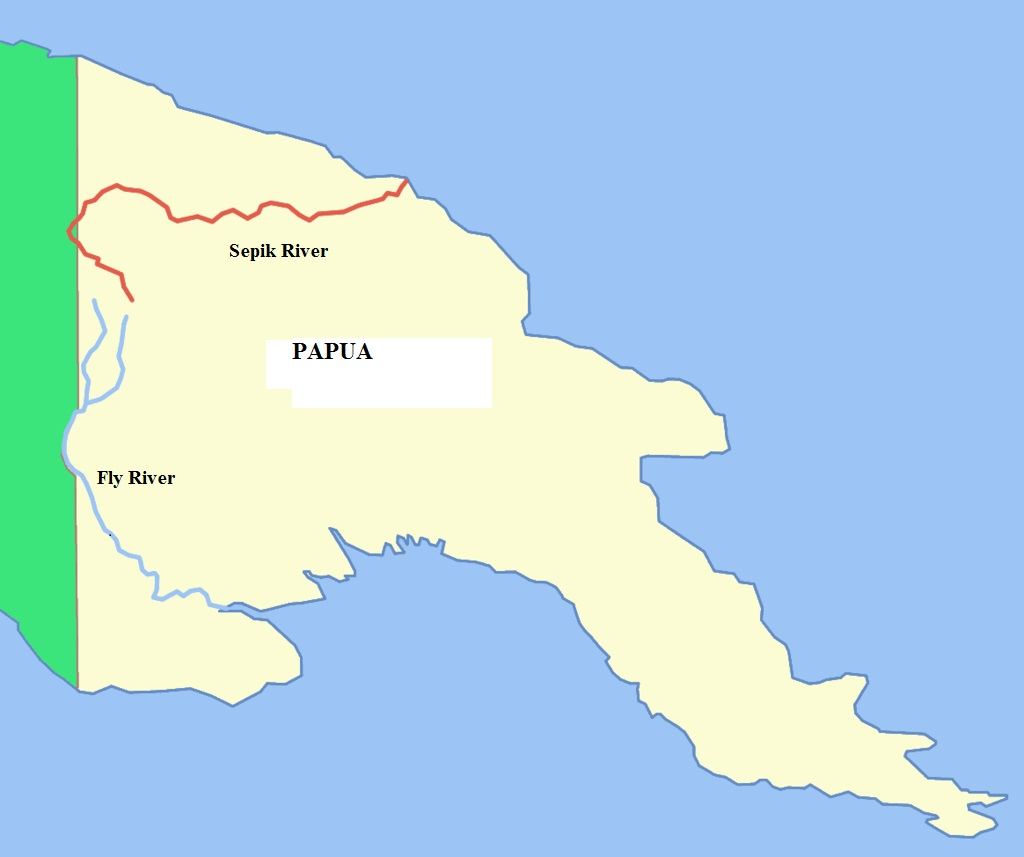
The 141st meridian divides the island of New Guinea between Indonesia (in green) and Papua New Guinea above the northern crossing of the Fly River with said meridian.

In Australia the meridian defines part of the border of South Australia with Queensland, all of its border with New South Wales, and it approximates its border with Victoria.

The 141st meridian east of Greenwich is a line of longitude that extends from the North Pole across the Arctic Ocean, Asia, the Pacific Ocean, Australasia, the Indian Ocean, the Southern Ocean, and Antarctica to the South Pole.

The 141st meridian east forms a great circle with the 39th meridian west.

== As a border ==
On the island of New Guinea, the meridian defines part of the land border between Indonesia on the west and Papua New Guinea on the east. The Fly River forms the border where it flows west of the 141st meridian. South of the Fly, the border runs slightly to the east of, and parallel to, the meridian (see Indonesia–Papua New Guinea border).

In Australia, it forms the eastern boundary of the state of South Australia, bordering Queensland and New South Wales. The border between South Australia and Victoria was originally proclaimed to be exactly on the 141st meridian, but measurement errors resulted in the present border being about 3.6 km (2.2 mi) west of this line at 140°57'45" (see South Australia–Victoria border dispute).

== From Pole to Pole ==
Starting at the North Pole and heading south to the South Pole, the 141st meridian east passes through:

Co-ordinates	Country, territory or sea	Notes
90°0′N 141°0′E	Arctic Ocean	
76°1′N 141°0′E	Russia	Sakha Republic — Kotelny Island, New Siberian Islands
74°54′N 141°0′E	East Siberian Sea	Sannikov Strait
74°15′N 141°0′E	Russia	Sakha Republic — Little Lyakhovsky Island, New Siberian Islands
73°59′N 141°0′E	East Siberian Sea	Sannikov Strait
73°47′N 141°0′E	Russia	Sakha Republic — Great Lyakhovsky Island, New Siberian Islands
73°23′N 141°0′E	East Siberian Sea	Laptev Strait
72°52′N 141°0′E	Russia	Sakha Republic; Khabarovsk Krai — from 62°29′N 141°0′E
72°42′N 141°0′E	Laptev Sea	
72°33′N 141°0′E	Russia	Khabarovsk Krai
58°25′N 141°0′E	Sea of Okhotsk	
53°24′N 141°0′E	Russia	Khabarovsk Krai
51°40′N 141°0′E	Strait of Tartary	Passing just west of Moneron Island, Sakhalin Oblast, Russia (at 46°13′N 141°11′E)
45°26′N 141°0′E	Japan	Hokkaidō Prefecture — Rebun Island
45°21′N 141°0′E	Sea of Japan	
43°14′N 141°0′E	Japan	Hokkaidō Prefecture — island of Hokkaidō (passing through Otaru)
42°18′N 141°0′E	Pacific Ocean	Uchiura Bay
41°54′N 141°0′E	Japan	Hokkaidō Prefecture — Oshima Peninsula, island of Hokkaidō
41°43′N 141°0′E	Tsugaru Strait	
41°29′N 141°0′E	Japan	Aomori Prefecture — Shimokita Peninsula, island of Honshū
41°11′N 141°0′E	Mutsu Bay	
40°56′N 141°0′E	Japan	Island of Honshū — Aomori Prefecture — Iwate Prefecture — from 40°13′N 141°0′E — Miyagi Prefecture — from 38°52′N 141°0′E
38°14′N 141°0′E	Pacific Ocean	Sendai Bay
37°46′N 141°0′E	Japan	Fukushima Prefecture, island of Honshū
37°6′N 141°0′E	Pacific Ocean	Passing just east of the island of Nishinoshima, Tokyo Prefecture, Japan (at 27°15′N 140°54′E)
2°36′S 141°0′E	Indonesia / Papua New Guinea border	
6°19′S 141°0′E	Papua New Guinea	The border diverts west to follow the Fly River
6°53′S 141°0′E	Indonesia	The border with Papua New Guinea runs parallel to the meridian, about 2 km (1.2 mi) to the east
9°7′S 141°0′E	Arafura Sea	
11°2′S 141°0′E	Gulf of Carpentaria	
16°57′S 141°0′E	Australia	Queensland; South Australia / Queensland border — from 26°0′S 141°0′E; South Australia / New South Wales border — from 29°0′S 141°0′E; Victoria — from 34°1′S 141°0′E, the border with South Australia runs parallel to the meridian, about 3 km (1.9 mi) to the west (see above)
38°4′S 141°0′E	Indian Ocean	Australian authorities consider this to be part of the Southern Ocean
60°0′S 141°0′E	Southern Ocean	
66°46′S 141°0′E	Antarctica	Adélie Land, claimed by France

== See also ==
- 140th meridian east
- 142nd meridian east
- Treaty of Zaragoza
