= William McKinnon (police officer) =

Australian police officer (1902–1997)

Bill McKinnon, seated on camel, in the Jubilee Day Parade in Alice Springs (Mparntwe), 1951

William "Bill" McKinnon (16 June 1902 – 15 May 1997) was an Australian police officer who worked for much of his career in the Northern Territory. McKinnon was involved in a number of reported incidents, including the death of Yokununna in 1934 where he was investigated for shooting an unarmed man, and the Petrov Affair. He was also the lead investigator in the Sundown murders.

== Early life ==
McKinnon was born in Ballina, in New South Wales, the youngest of four children of James and Susanna McKinnon. The family had emigrated to Australia in 1837 from the Isle of Skye in Scotland. His parents were sugar cane farmers and later also dairy farmers and they moved to Queensland where he completed his schooling first at Nambour (1911–1916) and then at Cleveland.

== Early career ==
In September 1922, McKinnon left his parents' home in Ballina, where he had been working as a grocery boy, with the intention of becoming a seagoing radio officer and he began studying at a radio school in Sydney. However, McKinnon did not complete the course. After breaking a rule, he was embarrassed by the school's response and decided not to return. Still wishing to go to sea, McKinnon signed up as a 'fireman's peggy' with the Union Steamship Company and completed one round trip on the RMS Niagara to Vancouver with them. It appears that McKinnon did not enjoy life at sea and, in July 1923, he joined the New South Wales Police Force as a mounted recruit and worked with them in several country towns throughout New South Wales. He left this police force after he accidentally discharged his rifle into his own head and was invalided out in May 1925. Despite this, he joined the Queensland Police Service in July 1925 but was discharged within six months for causing problems.

McKinnon worked as a warder within the Queensland prison system between April 1926 and December 1927 at the St Helena and Boggo Road Gaols. He then took a two-year contract with the police in Rabaul in Papua New Guinea beginning December 1927. After a falling out with the police superintendent, his contract was cancelled in November 1928. For part of his time in Rabaul, McKinnon was an 'acting gaoler' at the racially-segregated prison.

After being again let go from a police force, McKinnon spent some time working on ships around Papua New Guinea and then, on returning to Australia, on farms and then at the BHP steel works in Port Kembla on a 'pick and shovel gang'.

In 1930, during the Great Depression, McKinnon lost his job and tried his hand as a salesman but struggled to make a living wage.

== Life in the Northern Territory ==
McKinnon was accepted into the Northern Territory Police Force, commencing duty on 31 August 1931 in Alice Springs (Mparntwe) which then had a population of about 200 'Europeans'. For the next three years, based from there, McKinnon worked on the South West Camel Patrol, which covered most of central Australia. He would later comment, "I was not even aware that camel-teams existed in Australia, and I had never camped out in my life". On these patrols, he would travel with one or two Aboriginal trackers and six to eight camels for trips of three or four months at a time travelling over 3,000 kilometres (1,900 mi) on an average trip. One tracker he travelled with regularly was known as Dingo Mick and it was he who taught McKinnon how to cook damper and, more generally cook while on patrol.

During these trips, McKinnon would frequently take photographs of people and places that he saw, including self portraits, which he sent to Brisbane newspapers for publication. The Queenslander published some of these as a full-page spread.

On 21 February 1932, on one of these trips, McKinnon was recorded as being the first man (likely, the first European man) to climb to the highest point of Kata Tjuta when he was travelling alongside Hedley Herbert Finlayson. At the top, he built a cairn.

=== Death of Yokununna ===
In 13 October 1934, McKinnon fatally shot a Pitjantjatjara man named Yokununna at Uluru on one of his camel patrols. Yokununna had earlier been arrested by McKinnon on suspicion about his involvement in another Aboriginal man's death and, after escaping from McKinnon and his trackers, he had taken shelter in a cave and this is where McKinnon shot him. In the official record of events, McKinnon states that he shot at some distance and was not aiming to shoot him. However, his personal journals, found in 2019, contradict this. Yokununna's death, as well as an early incident where McKinnon was accused of 'thrashing' Aboriginal boys at Hermannsburg (Ntaria), led to a government inquiry. The Commonwealth Board of Enquiry into the alleged ill-treatment of Aborigines near Ayers Rock was led by Charles Mountford to investigate McKinnon's actions.

During the enquiry, the board took evidence from a number of locations, including Uluru, Hermannsburg and Alice Springs (Mparntwe). McKinnon was allowed to accompany the party and conduct his own defence. The board ultimately found McKinnon not guilty of killing Yokununna but did find that the "shooting of Yokununna […] though legally justified, was not warranted". McKinnon was, however, found guilty of violence towards the men at Hermannsburg and this finding angered many, including Mountford.

As a result of the investigation, McKinnon was denied a salary increase for one year.

=== 1936–1950 ===
From 1936 to 1938, McKinnon was officially based at the Alice Springs Police Station but worked primarily at Charlotte Waters until the station closed and then at Finke (Aputula) where he opened the new station there. During this period, he also relieved other officers at Arltunga (1936), Barrow Creek (1937) and Tennant Creek (1938) while also sometimes returning to the camel patrols. In these role he was often tasked with collecting children that would become The Stolen Generations and he called this "[d]istasteful, difficult, and sometimes dangerous work".

He was first promoted in October 1941 and transferred to Darwin, where he was present during the Bombing of Darwin. He remained serving with the police throughout World War II and served for most of it at Borroloola and Katherine until he was allowed, in March 1944, to transfer to Tennant Creek where his wife and young daughter had been evacuated.

McKinnon was again in Darwin after the end of the war. In August 1947, he was promoted to senior sergeant and, on 17 April 1950, to inspector and transferred back to Alice Springs. In 1951, McKinnon was promoted to senior inspector and returned again to Darwin.

=== 1954–1962 ===
In 1954, McKinnon led the police contingent at the Darwin Airport where he was to aid Evdokia Petrova, the wife of a defecting diplomat, during the Petrov Affair. He was under strict orders that there would be no violence but he was later accused of almost starting an international incident while there when he aimed his loaded gun at the Russian guards. He would later say of this "[w]e should all have been dismissed or we should all have got a medal. We got neither."

In 1955, McKinnon moved back to Alice Springs, still working with the police, and he lived in a house next to the courthouse. The courthouse was regularly visited by Olive Pink and she and McKinnon could regularly be seen arguing, Pink viewed McKinnon as 'unclean' and that he should have been convicted for murdering Yokununna while he saw her as a 'regular nuisance' with a 'most dangerous tongue'. In December 1957, McKinnon led the investigation into the Sundown murders. The same year, McKinnon won £6,000 in a NSW lottery.

In 1959, McKinnon was awarded with a medal from the Queen for 'long service and good conduct'. He retired from the police force in June 1962.

== Personal life and death ==
McKinnon had married Doreen Letchford Taylor in Alice Springs on 10 December 1934.

After retiring, he and his wife moved to Buderim in Queensland. McKinnon later died at Nambour on 15 May 1997.

== Collections ==
McKinnon was an avid collector and donated many of his personal archives to Library & Archives NT; these include:

- NTRS 321, Correspondence and memoirs relating to Northern Territory Police Force, including photographs of Central Australia (c1932–1981).
- NTRS 1336, Photographs of Darwin and police work in the Northern Territory (1931–1945).

Library & Archives NT also hold an oral history interview with McKinnon which was recorded in 1981.
