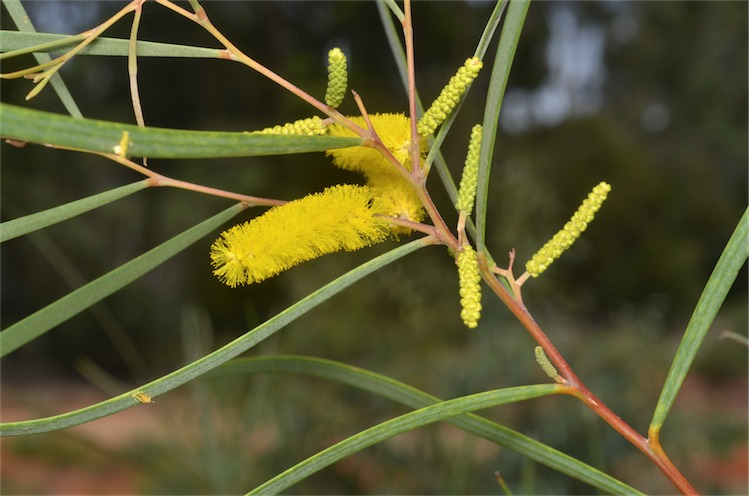

Conservation status
- Data Deficient (TPWCA)

Scientific classification
- Kingdom: Plantae
- Clade: Tracheophytes
- Clade: Angiosperms
- Clade: Eudicots
- Clade: Rosids
- Order: Fabales
- Family: Fabaceae
- Subfamily: Caesalpinioideae
- Clade: Mimosoid clade
- Genus: Acacia
- Species: A. desmondii

Binomial name
- Acacia desmondii Maslin
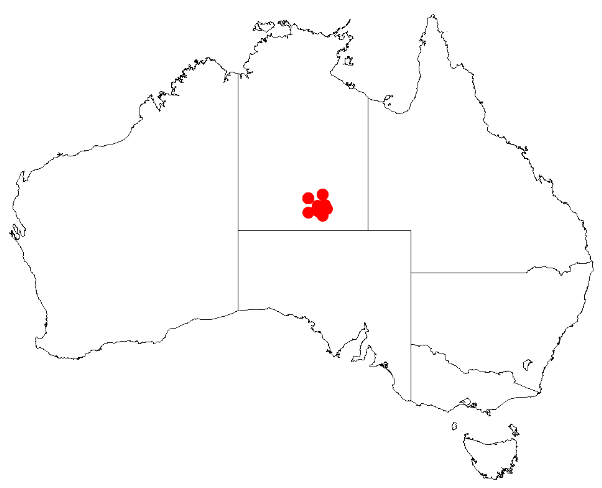
- Occurrence data from Australasian Virtual Herbarium

Synonyms
- Acacia nelsonii Maslin nom. illeg.; Racosperma nelsonii Pedley

= Acacia desmondii =

Des Nelson wattle

Species of legume

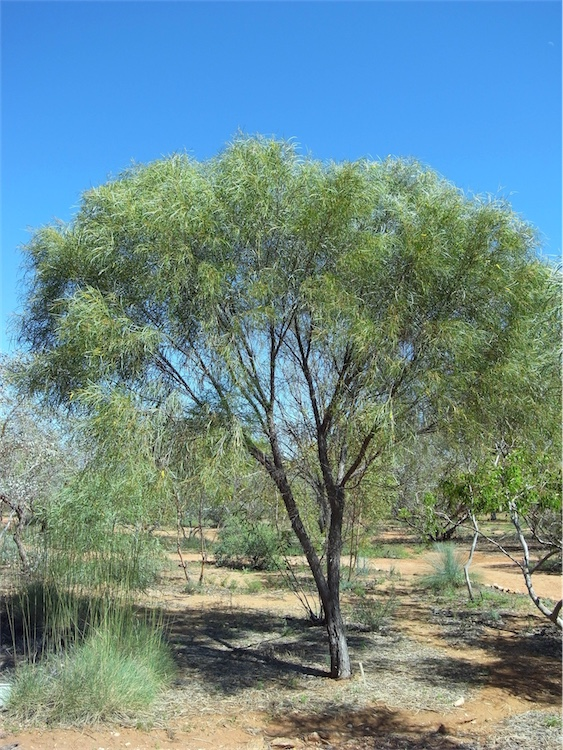
In Olive Pink Botanic Garden

Acacia desmondii, commonly known as Des Nelson wattle, is a species of flowering plant in the family Fabaceae and is endemic to the Northern Territory in Australia. It is a shrubby tree with minni ritchi bark, linear flattened, glabrous phyllodes, spikes of light golden yellow flowers and oblong to elliptic, firmly papery and brittle pods.

== Description ==
Acacia desmondii is a shrubby tree that typically grows to a height of 3–6 m (9.8–19.7 ft) and has grey, fibrous bark, and minni ritchi bark on young plants and some side branches. Its branchlets are more or less terete, obscurely ridged and glabrous. The phyllodes are linear, 120–230 mm (4.7–9.1 in) long, 0.9–2.3 mm (0.035–0.091 in) wide, tapered towards the base and sometimes curved near the tip. The phyllodes are flattened but rather thick and glabrous with fine, uniform striations produced by many closely spaced veins. The flowers are light golden yellow and borne in spikes in axils 1–3 mm (0.039–0.118 in) long on a peduncle 2–10 mm (0.079–0.394 in) long. Flowering occurs between July and November, and the pods are straight to curved, 25–90 mm (0.98–3.54 in) long, 2–4 mm (0.079–0.157 in) wide and raised over and constricted between the seeds, appearing somewhat like a string of beads, 25–90 mm (0.98–3.54 in) long and 2–4 mm (0.079–0.157 in) wide, firmly papery and brittle. The seeds are oblong, 4.0–4.5 mm (0.16–0.18 in) long and shiny black.

== Taxonomy ==
This species of wattle was first formally described in 1980 by Bruce Maslin who gave it the name Acacia nelsonii in the Journal of the Adelaide Botanic Gardens from specimens collected on Todd River Station in 1979, but the name was illegitimate because it had previously been used in 1914 for a Mexican species. In 1987, Maslin changed the name to A. desmondii in the journal Nuytsia. The specific epithets (nelsonii and desmondii) honour Desmond J. Nelson, a botanist who worked for CSIRO in Alice Springs, "in recognition of his contribution to botanical exploration in the Northern Territory".

== Distribution ==
Acacia desmondii is endemic to a small area among the plains and hills of the Rodinga Range, Train Hills and Pillar Range on Allambi Station and Todd River Station in the Finke, MacDonnell Ranges and Simpson Strzelecki Dunefields bioregions in the south of the Northern Territory where it often grows along stony watercourses and in dry rocky gullies at the foot of the ranges and on rocky sandstone cliffs.

== Conservation status ==
Acacia desmondii is listed as "data deficient" under the Northern Territory Government Territory Parks and Wildlife Conservation Act.

== See also ==
- List of Acacia species
