= Aputula =

Aputula (Finke)
- Town
- Coordinates: 25°34′52″S 134°34′40″E
- Country: Australia
- State: Northern Territory
- LGA: Central Land Council
- Location: 159 km (99 mi) east of Stuart Highway

Government
  - Territory electorate: Namatjira
  - Federal division: Lingiari

Population
  - Total: 191 (2021)
- Postcode: 0872
- Mean max temp: 37.5 °C (99.5 °F)
- Mean min temp: 5.6 °C (42.1 °F)
- Annual rainfall: 188.8 mm (7.43 in)

Aputula, alternatively spelt Apatula (formerly Finke until the 1980s), is a remote Indigenous Australian community in the Northern Territory of Australia. It is 317 km (197 mi) south of Alice Springs and 159 km (99 mi) east of Kulgera roadhouse on the Stuart Highway, near the border with South Australia. The Finke River (named after German explorer and pastoralist William Finke), runs within a few kilometres of the community. The river, which is part of the Lake Eyre basin, is dry for most of the year, but is subject to occasional floods.

== Location and geography ==
Aputula is the farthest populated place from the sea in mainland Australia, and therefore the nearest settlement to the geographical centre: the Lambert centre point of mainland Australia is 23 kilometres (14 miles) west-southwest of the township.

== History ==
A railway siding called Finke Siding was created on the Central Australia Railway around 1925. It began as a small working men's camp, where the fettlers (railway workers) lived in concrete buildings without family. The nearest police and postal services were at Charlotte Waters and the district's cattle yards and railway station were at Rumbalara. Car travellers were rare. Aboriginal people started visiting the siding as soon as it was built. Lower Southern Arrernte and Luritja people established a camp in the sandhills nearby, trading dingo scalps, wild flowers, artefacts and other items for water and food.

A police station was built in the late 1930s, after the Charlotte Waters one closed down and the policemen, trackers, their families and some "aged and infirm" Aboriginal people moved to Finke. Residents petitioned for a postal service in 1938. Aboriginal visitors increased as people from Ernabella came to pick up supplies from the train. During the war years, the Central Australian Railway was the main transport route for thousands of soldiers from the southern states going to war in the Pacific, and the siding got its first repeater station operator as well as its first privately owned business.

After World War II, local pastoralists convinced the government to move its cattle yards from Rumbalara to Finke because the water quality at Finke was much better, and the population was thus boosted. In 1947, the first pub, Finke Hotel, owned by Ted Colson (who had been the first European person to cross the Simpson Desert), was opened. An air strip, which gave access to the Royal Flying Doctor Service, and race track were built by the Aboriginal residents. In 1949 the government started subsidising the town's water supply, but the 1950s saw a water crisis. In 1953, the school was opened, and Town of Finke formally proclaimed on 18 August 1955, with town lands made available by auction in October.

In the 1960s, the Aboriginal population of Finke rose as drought and government patrols moved nomads off traditional hunting grounds, and there less work on cattle stations owing to changes in the industry. The people lived in wurlies, hunted rabbits and sold artefacts to increasing numbers of train tourists.

Most non-Aboriginal people left Finke when the railway line was shifted westwards in the late 1970s, following the huge track-damaging floods of 1973 and 1974. The Indigenous population did not move. Instead, with the help of Margaret Bain, a Uniting Church missionary from Ernabella, they moved off the sand dunes into houses they built themselves. It was during this time that the town came to be known as Aputula, and transitioned from a European township to an Aboriginal community. The name comes from a place called 'Putula' (an Arrernte word) near the community, which used to be the site of a water soakage, where Arrernte people used to get their water, before the white people and the railway line came to the area. It also became a "dry town", after the council bought the pub and Johnny Briscoe, the town's first Aboriginal Health Worker, became the publican and ran it dry before giving away its liquor licence.

The Aputula Housing Company, founded in the 1970s, has played an important part in the economy, and was run by local people as well as a group of Torres Strait Islanders who moved inland after the war.

Several of the old buildings in Aputula, including the old police station, school and railway buildings have been nominated for heritage listing by the NT Heritage Council.

=== Camel police ===
Finke used to have a police force mounted on camels, possibly "the largest police patrol in the world", and the last police station in the NT to use camels. Aboriginal trackers were an essential part of the patrols, which were often responsible for finding people lost in the bush. The last camel patrol left Finke in 1953. Trackers were also invaluable in solving crimes such as the Sundown murders in 1957. Finke police were also responsible for inspecting stock, registration of births, marriages and deaths, looking after mines, protecting birds and collecting taxes. The policemen's wives ran the post office, and also distributed rations while their husbands were away on patrol and nursed sick people (there were no nurses or doctors in Finke).

== Climate and demographics ==
Aputula holds the record of having the two hottest days ever recorded in the Northern Territory: 48.3 °C (118.9 °F) on 1 and 2 January 1960.

In the 2021 census, the town and the immediately surrounding area had a population of 191 in 42 families; there were 59 private dwellings.

The residents are Pitjantjatjara, Yankunytjatjara, Luritja, and Lower Southern Arrernte people. Most of the current inhabitants of Finke are migrants from the Western desert, who acknowledge that they are living on Southern Arrernte soil. The site has never been used as an Aboriginal camping place, even in pre-European times, because of the lack of water.

== Notable inhabitants ==
- Ted Colson (1881–1950), pioneer and pastoralist, known for being the first European person to cross the Simpson Desert.
- Brownie Doolan (1918–2011), tracker and the last person to speak the Lower Arrernte language.
- Tali Tali Pompey (about 1945/47 – 16 November 2011), artist.

== Sports ==
- Australian rules football, with a team in the SANFL APY League
- Finke Desert Race
- Simpson Desert Bike Challenge
