= Olive Pink =

Australian botanical illustrator, anthropologist, gardener and activist

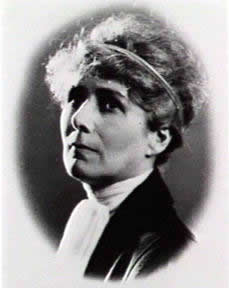
- Born: Olive Muriel Pink; 17 March 1884; Hobart, Tasmania, Australia
- Died: 6 July 1975 (aged 91); Alice Springs, Northern Territory, Australia

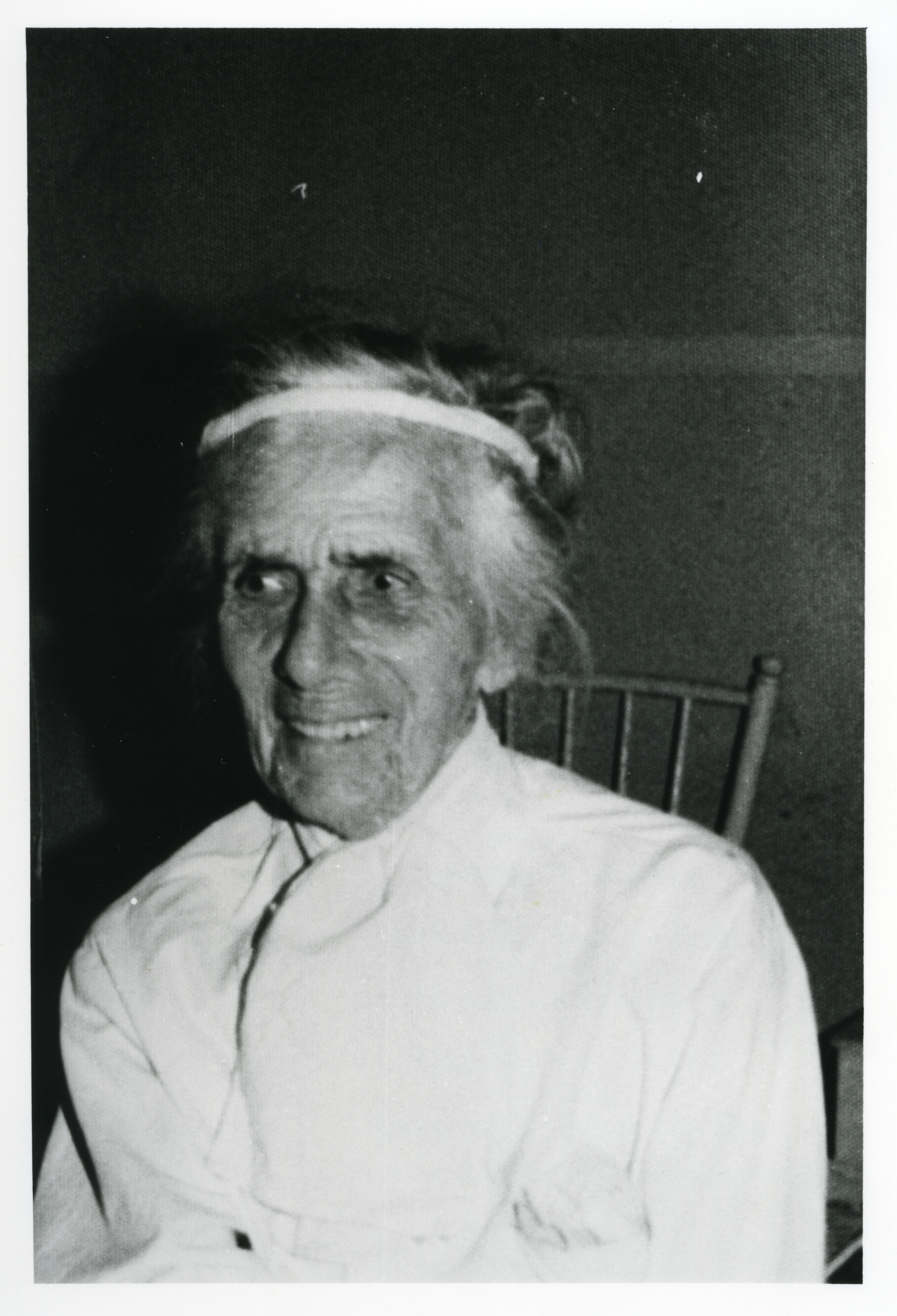
Olive Pink on her 90th birthday in 1974

Olive Muriel Pink (17 March 1884 – 6 July 1975) was an Australian botanical illustrator, anthropologist, gardener, and activist for Aboriginal rights who spent much of her life in Central Australia.

Pink spent much of her life agitating and being a passionate advocate for improved rights and conditions for Australia's Indigenous people. She never married, having lost a "very dear friend" Harold Southern, a fellow artist who was killed at Gallipoli in 1915. In her later years, Pink concentrated on botanical pursuits and established the currently named Olive Pink Botanic Garden in Alice Springs.

== Early life ==
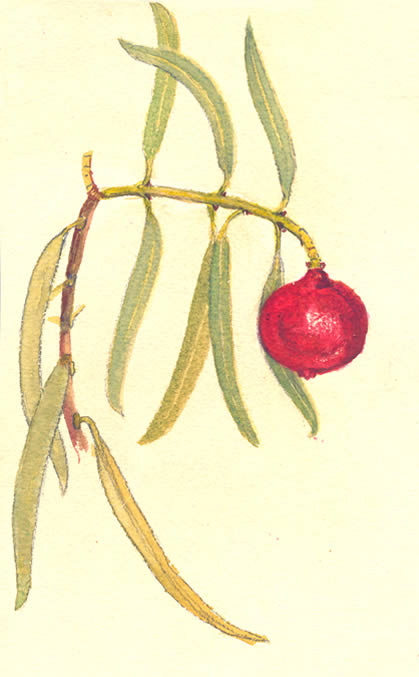
Illustration of a quandong by Olive Pink

Pink was born in Hobart, Tasmania, the eldest child of Robert Stuart Pink and his wife Eveline Fanny Margaret (née Kerr). She received her education from Hobart Girls High School and later studied art at Hobart Technical School under artist and sculptor Benjamin Sheppard. In 1909 she joined as staff of the school.

Her father died in 1907, and in 1911 she moved with her mother and brother to Perth, Western Australia, and then in 1914 to Sydney, offering art lessons both privately and in private girls' schools. In May 1915, she joined the New South Wales Department of Public Works as a tracer, having attained a town planning diploma the previous year. Sometime later she moved to the NSW Government Railways and Tramways where she designed various advertising posters. During this period, she developed her artistic skills further by attending classes at the Sydney Art School, one of the most influential art schools in Australia, run by Julian Ashton.

== Central Australia ==
In 1926 she holidayed with well-known welfare worker and anthropologist Daisy Bates in remote Ooldea on the edge of the Nullarbor Plain, having her first encounter with Aboriginal culture. This visit was one of the major experiences which inspired her to pursue a career in Anthropology. (Note: While initially friends, Pink was later infuriated by the comparisons made between herself and Bates. This was due in part to Bates's claims of cannibalism and infanticide among the Aboriginal women at Ooldea, which Pink rebutted.) In 1930, Pink found herself retrenched from her government position and with her interest having been piqued by visits to the remote countryside, she travelled to Central Australia sketching desert flora.

She returned to Sydney and attended lectures in anthropology at the University of Sydney and became secretary to the Anthropological Society of New South Wales. Between 1933 and 1936 she received grants from the Australian National Research Council, then chaired by AP Elkin (with whom she had a difficult relationship), to work among the Eastern Arrernte people near Alice Springs and the Warlpiri people of the Tanami Desert in Ilpirra Country. She published several papers on the Arrernte in 1933 and 1936, but, sensitive to cultural needs, refused to release her work on the Warlpiri; this effectively ended her anthropological career and also raised questions about why she decided to publish similar information about the Arrernte. At this time TGH Strehlow damned her lack of professional qualifications and attempted to have her prevented from visiting Aboriginal reserved and missions, She also met Albert Namatjira during this period and purchased two of his early paintings. The two remained friends until his death in 1959.

During this early period of work Pink started agitating by writing letters to politicians and newspapers to raise the profile and awareness of difficulties faced by Aboriginal people; this practice would continue for the rest of her life. She strongly criticised government officials, missionaries and pastoralists, making uncompromising demands and constantly badgering politicians. In 1938 she sought help from the Sheetmetal Workers' Union, an organisation with communist ties, which resulted in her being investigated by ASIO as a communist sympathiser. It was found that she was no threat.

In 1946, with a small grant from Quaker benefactors and the Sheetmetal Worker's Union, Pink attempted to establish a "secular sanctuary" (or commune) for the Warlpiri people in the Tanami Desert at Thompsons Rockhole (Pirdi Pirdi). While there she would continue her research and operate a ration depot. In 1946 she moved Papinya with about thirty Warlpiri people until drought, the breakdown of her car, and a violent incident with two Warlpiri men she had refused food forced her back to Alice Springs in the same year. This area would later become Yuendumu.

Back in Alice Springs and suffering financial difficulties she lived in huts and a tent on the outskirts of the town and living off the proceeds of her home grown fruit and flowers and exhibitions of her artwork at the museum she established at her home. She also worked at the local courthouse and continued agitating for reform via extensive correspondence. During this period she heard reports of poor conditions in the Alice Springs Gaol and, after being refused an official visit, disrupted the court so that she was given a fine or 5 days in prison. She was furious when the then Warden Philip Muldoon paid her fine rather than have her in the gaol. It was also in this period she met with the artist Sidney Nolan and his wife, with whom she discussed her experiences with Aboriginal people. She refused the old age pension and lived on an income of approximately £6.00 a week.

Also during this period Pink also had a series of arguments with the local police inspector William (Bill) McKinnon and the pair could frequently be seen arguing; Pink viewed McKinnon as 'unclean' and that he should have been convicted for the death of Yokununna while he saw her as a 'regular nuisance' with a 'most dangerous tongue'. He also believed her to be a 'menace to the security of Court House business' and banned her from visiting. It is possible that McKinnon led, or allowed, the harassment of Pink by government officials which saw her being evicted from her hut on Gregory Terrace.

In 1955 she applied to the Northern Territory Administrator for a reservation of about 20 hectares of land on the eastern bank of the Todd River as a flora reserve. The following year the grant was gazetted as the Australian Arid Regions Flora Reserve, with assistance from the Minister for the Territories, Sir Paul Hasluck. Pink was appointed as the honorary curator.

Hasluck had considerable correspondence with Pink over many years. In the Northern Territory Newsletter obituary in 1975 he told the following story:

At the Arid Zone reserve Miss Pink planted trees and, with the aid of her Aboriginal helper, watered them and tended them. Each tree bore the name of some prominent citizen and if that citizen fell out of favour with her she ceased to water it. So that if the leaves of 'Mr Archer' were drooping and the leaves of 'Mr Marsh' were bright and green or 'Mr Barclay' was growing vigorously one knew at once what had happened in the handling of her latest request. I visited her on several occasions and could never restrain a curious glance at my tree and felt suitably gratified if I saw that 'Mr Hasluck' was being watered regularly.

== Death ==
Pink lived in the reserve, assisted by her long-time companion and gardener, Johnny Jambijimba Yannarilyi, until her death in Alice Springs at the age of 91. She died in Alice Springs Hospital and is buried in the Alice Springs Memorial Cemetery, within the Quaker section, a group with which she held close ties throughout her life and close to the Aboriginal section of the cemetery. Pink was also buried, according to her instructions, with her gravestone facing west (opposite to others buried there), toward Mount Gillen which she loved.

== Legacy ==
In 1975, the botanical garden she built was renamed the Olive Pink Botanic Garden and opened to the public in 1985. That garden was the inspiration for Anne Boyd's 2017 orchestral composition Olive Pink's Garden. Boyd's 2022 opera, Olive Pink, was premiered in the garden.

A collection of Pink's sketches, in pencil and crayon, is held in the University of Tasmania Library, to whom she bequeathed most of her art collection. Several Namatjira paintings previously owned by her were bequeathed and are held at the Tasmanian Museum and Art Gallery.

Much of her correspondence has also been collected by major cultural institutions including the National Archives of Australia, AIATSIS and Library & Archives NT.

== See also ==
- List of Australian botanical illustrators
