= Tali Tali Pompey =

Australian artist

- Born: c. 1945-1947; Finke, Northern Territory, Australia
- Died: 16 November 2011; Alice Springs, Northern Territory
- Occupation: Painter
- Years active: 2002 – present
- Organization: Kaltjiti Arts
- Style: Western Desert art
- Children: 6 sons, 2 daughters

Tali Tali Pompey (about 1945/47 – 16 November 2011) was an Aboriginal artist from central Australia. She had a short career as an artist, beginning only in 2002. During this time, however, her work was taken in by several major public galleries.

== Life ==
Pompey was born on a sand dune near Finke, in the southern Northern Territory. This inspired her name; tali is the word for a sandhill in languages of the Western Desert. Pompey's parents were Yankunytjatjara people from lands further south, around Kalka and Kaṉpi in South Australia. Pompey grew up in the area around Finke, and then moved south to Ernabella when she was a young woman. At the time, this was a Christian mission set up for Aboriginal people coming in from the desert. While living in Ernabella, learned art and craft at the community's craft room. She learned how to sew, make batik, dye fabrics and spin sheep's wool to make rugs.

Pompey's husband, whom she married at Ernabella, was a Pitjantjatjara elder and law keeper for the country around Kaltjiti. They moved to Kaltjiti after it was set up as an outpost in the 1960s. They had 8 children, including six boys and two girls.

Pompey started painting for the community's art centre, Kaltjiti Arts, in 2002. She painted regularly and became quickly noticed by critics. In 2003, one of Pompey's paintings, titled Pita, was chosen as a finalist for the National Aboriginal and Torres Strait Islander Art Award. Another of her works, Para – Desert Gums, was chosen as a finalist for the competition in 2010.

In the ten years that she worked as an artist, Pompey's works became well represented in Australian collections. In 2007, she suffered a mild stroke, which affected the movement in her left hand. She recovered and then continued to paint up until her death. She died on 16 November 2011, in Alice Springs.

== Artwork ==
Pompey's paintings depict features of the central Australian landscape, such as sand hills, flowers and trees. These are painted with a soft-focus, hazy look. Most of her paintings are minimalist in style, combining basic shapes of colour with dotted fields or lines. She was known for thick brushstrokes and a wide use of colour.

Pompey's designs were also used in a series of rugs made by Kaltjiti Arts, which combined traditional Kashmiri techniques with Australian Western Desert designs.

Pompey's work has been exhibited widely in Australia, mostly in group exhibitions. The Mossenson Galleries in Melbourne held two solo exhibitions of Pompey's work. The first was in 2005. The second was in 2012, after her death, and showed a selection of her final works.

Examples of her paintings are now held in the National Gallery of Victoria, and the Art Gallery of South Australia.
