= Colson Track =

Dirt track in Australia

Colson Track Northern Territory–South Australia
- The Colson Track (blue and white)

General information
- Type: Track
- Length: 336 km (209 mi)

Major junctions
- North end: Numery Station 24.012223°S 135.426978°E; Hale, Northern Territory
- South end: Lynnies Junction 26.323285°S 136.822924°E; Simpson Desert, South Australia

Location(s)
- Region: Central Australia (NT), Far North (SA)

Restrictions
- Permits: 2 required

Colson Track is a remote dirt track in Australia running between Numery Station in Hale, Northern Territory, and the Simpson Desert in South Australia. It is named in honour of Ted Colson, the first person of European descent to make a successful crossing of the Simpson Desert on foot.

== Description ==
The northern terminus is marked by a sign near the boundary of Numery Station. The southern terminus of the track is at Lynnies Junction, where it meets with the WAA Line, just east of Rig Road, in the western Simpson Desert. The length of the track is 336 km, much of which is in swales between sand dunes. The track is defined only by wheel ruts, but it may disappear with washouts and long grass making navigation difficult.

The surface is mostly red sand and may be corrugated. The track should be negotiated by four-wheel drive high clearance vehicles only. A permit to cross Aboriginal land is required. An additional permit is required for travel across the Simpson Desert.

== See also ==
- Hay River Track
