= Anne Boyd =

Australian composer

Anne Elizabeth Boyd AM (born 10 April 1946) is an Australian composer and emeritus professor of music at the University of Sydney.

== Early life ==
Boyd was born in Sydney to James Boyd and Annie Freda Deason Boyd (née Osborn).

Her father died when she was age 3, and her mother sent her to live with relatives on a sheep station (Maneroo) near Longreach, in central Queensland. This intimate experience with the Australian landscape – its expansiveness, its dramatic changes, and its "indescribable energy" – had a profound influence on her future as a composer. She began composing while still at Maneroo, at the age of eight, for the resources she had available: recorder and voice. She moved to Canberra aged 11.

In New South Wales she received her education at Albury High School and Hornsby Girls' High School.

Boyd studied music at the University of Sydney, where she was one of Peter Sculthorpe's first students. Sculthorpe had a profound influence on her; she said that his music was the first time she had heard music which expressed her experience of the Australian landscape. After receiving her Bachelor of Arts (Honours) degree, she received a PhD in composition from the University of York in England.

== Career ==
In 1990 Boyd became the first Australian and the first woman to be appointed to a professor of music at the University of Sydney. Before that Boyd was the foundation head of the Department of Music at the University of Hong Kong (1981–90) and taught at the University of Sussex (1972–77). In 1996 she was appointed a Member of the Order of Australia for her contributions to music as a composer and as an educator.

Boyd's struggle to maintain funding for music courses in the Faculty of Arts at the University of Sydney was featured in the documentary Facing the Music (2001). The Department of Music was incorporated into the Sydney Conservatorium at the same university from the start of 2005.

== Music ==
Many of Boyd's compositions have an East Asian influence, especially the music of Japan (such as the wood flute and the Japanese mode) and Indonesia (such as the gamelan orchestra and the Balinese modes). Many of her works are of a spiritual or meditative nature, such as the a cappella work As I Crossed a Bridge of Dreams (1975). She has written song cycles, opera, piano, choral, orchestral and chamber music. Her musical compositions include: Goldfish Through Summer Rain 1979, The Little Mermaid 1980, Black Sun 1990, Revelations of Divine Love 1995, Meditations on a Chinese Character 1996, A Vision: Jesus Reassures His Mother 1999, and YuYa 2005.

Her 2017 orchestral composition Olive Pink's Garden was inspired by the Olive Pink Botanic Garden in Alice Springs, and her 2022 opera about the life of Olive Pink was premiered there.

CDs include: Meditations on a Chinese Character 1997, and Crossing a Bridge of Dreams 2000.

== Athletic performances ==
Boyd is an endurance runner and marathoner who has won her age group in marathons, half marathons and 10 km races. Boyd ran her first marathon after only 18 months' training. She has been described as a 'lady of musical and running talents' and an 'inspiring distance runner', running with her daughter and raising money for cancer. She won her age group in the Sydney Striders marathon trophy.

== Awards and recognition ==
- Member of the Order of Australia (AM), 1996 Australia Day Honours, "in recognition of service as a composer and educator"
- Awarded honorary degree by University of York, 2003
- Recipient of a Special Award for Distinguished Services to Australian Music at the APRA/AMC Classical Music Awards in 2005.

=== Bernard Heinze Memorial Award ===
The Sir Bernard Heinze Memorial Award is given to a person who has made an outstanding contribution to music in Australia.

| Year | Nominee / work | Award | Result | Ref. |
|---|---|---|---|---|
| 2014 | Anne Boyd | Sir Bernard Heinze Memorial Award | awarded | |
