= Mark McKenna (historian) =

Australian historian specialising in Australian republicanism and Aboriginal history

Mark McKenna FAHA (born 1959) is a professor of history at the University of Sydney, noted for his work on Aboriginal history, a biography of Manning Clark and the history of republicanism in Australia.

== Biography ==
=== Early life and education ===
McKenna was born in 1959 and grew up in the Sydney suburb of Toongabbie. After graduating with a Bachelor of Arts from the University of Sydney, he lived in Europe for a period and then taught in high schools in Sydney before completing his PhD at the University of New South Wales in 1996.

=== Awards and recognition ===
McKenna was elected a Fellow of the Australian Academy of the Humanities in 2013.

His book Return to Uluru about the shooting death of Yokununna by William (Bill) McKinnon was shortlisted for the 2022 Prime Minister's Literary Award for Australian history.

McKenna's The Shortest History of Australia, was shortlisted for the non-fiction category at The Age Book of the Year Awards in 2026.

== Bibliography ==
=== Books ===
- McKenna, Mark (1996). The Captive Republic: A History of Republicanism in Australia 1788–1996. Melbourne: Cambridge University Press.
- —— (2002). Looking for Blackfellas' Point: An Australian History of Place. Sydney: UNSW Press.
- —— (2002). Building a Closet of Prayer in the New World: The Story of the Australian Ballot. London: Menzies Centre for Australian Studies.
- ——; Hudson, Wayne (2003). Australian Republicanism: A Reader. Carlton: Melbourne University Press.
- —— (2004). This Country: A Reconciled Republic?. Sydney: UNSW Press.
- —— (2011). An Eye for Eternity: The Life of Manning Clark. Carlton: The Miegunyah Press.
- —— (2016). From the Edge: Australia's Lost Histories. Melbourne: The Miegunyah Press.
- —— (2021). Return to Uluru (1st ed.). Black Inc.
- —— (2025). The Shortest History of Australia (1st ed.). Black Inc. ISBN 9781760643591.

=== Essays ===
- McKenna, Mark (March 2018). "Moment of Truth: History and Australia's Future". Quarterly Essay. 69: 1–86.
