= Philip Muldoon =

Australian prison warden (1897–1979)

Philip Francis Muldoon also known as Phil Muldoon (3 May 1897 – 9 June 1979) was a clerk, police officer and prison warden who spent much of his life in the Northern Territory of Australia.

== Early life ==
Muldoon was born is Mount Barker, South Australia and was the son of John Joseph Muldoon, a migrant from Ireland, and Mary Jane née Peake who was also born in Mount Barker. He was the tenth of thirteen children.

He attended school an Hanhdorf College and left at the age of 14 to work on the family farm and apprentice to a blacksmith. In 1914 he began working for the Postmaster-General's Department (PMG) as a delivery boy in the Mount Barker area until his father's death later in 1914.

After his father's death his family moved to Adelaide and Muldoon became a clerk in the PMG's offices there before a brief transfer to Mount Gambier before accepting a transfer to Darwin in the Northern Territory.

== Life in the Northern Territory ==
Muldoon arrived in Darwin on 4 April 1919 aboard the Mataram and after a brief period working for the PMG there, on 19 May 1919, was appointed to the Northern Territory mounted police where he worked initially in Darwin and then a brief transfer to Timber Creek.

In 1924 Muldoon was a relieving officer in Katherine and then to Newcastle Waters and during the period at Newcastle Waters Muldoon took leave and travelled to Adelaide where he met Bertilla Williams and they married on 12 May 1928. Early in their marriage, when Bertilla had returned to Adelaide to give birth to their first child Muldoon became seriously ill and was treated for Dengue fever by the Royal Flying Doctor Service. This proved to be a serious illness and was nearly fatal and, for medical reasons, he was transferred to Alice Springs where he worked for the police station there.

In Alice Springs he was able to greet Bertilla and their son, Brian Vincent, when they arrived on the first passenger train to arrive in the town in August 1929. Because of his health Muldoon had been given the choice to be transferred to Canberra but chose to remain in the Northern Territory.

While in Alice Springs Muldoon spent time as a police officer, a role in which he also acted as the mining warden, in Arltunga, Barrow Creek, Tennant Creek and at the Hatches Creek wolfram field.

His second child, Patricia Anne, was born in Alice Springs, at Adelaide House in 1937.

In 1938 Muldoon resigned from the police force due to his health and, on 1 November 1938, accepted the position of prison warden at Her Majesty's Gaol and Labour Prison, Alice Springs which had just been built. He was its first warden and was officially referred to as its Keeper. He worked there alongside Bertilla who was the unpaid matron and cared for the female prisoners.

During the Muldoons' management, the gaol had a reputation for being neatly maintained and the pair led the creation of substantial vegetable, fruit and flower gardens. Muldoon also constructed the first tennis court for people within the Alice Springs CBD, as the only other court was located at the Alice Springs Telegraph Station, this court, with its ant-bed floor, was used by the prison population during the week and other residents of the town on weekends.

Former residents of the gaol talk highly of Muldoon and say that he was a kind man who treated all prisoners alike and Max Cartwright called him "[a] most humane and dedicated Christian man thus created a model prison system".

One famous incident in his time as warden was when he paid the fine of Olive Pink, out of his own money, so that she would not be sent there for 5 days. She had intentionally committed an offense, after being denied an inspection of the gaol, in order to spend time there.

Muldoon retired on 11 October 1958 due to his health and, in 1960, he received an Imperial Service Medal from the Queen.

Later in his life Muldoon wrote his memoirs, which were never published, and they were later found, by chance, at the Alice Springs tip and were later deposited at Library & Archives NT.

Muldoon and his wife relocated to Henley Beach, South Australia on 8 July 1964. Muldoon died on 9 June 1979 there.

== Resources about ==
The following resources are available about Muldoon:

- Memoir - Typescript of memoirs of PF (Phil) Muldoon including service as police officer, mining warden and prison officer (NTRS 331).
- Oral History - Interview with Phil Muldoon / interviewed by Catherine Slessor (1964) at Library & Archives NT (NTS 2368 TS 7602). His wife, Bertilla, was also interviewed in 1981 (NTRS 226 TS 291).
