= Bob Beer =

Australian adventurer (1942–2021)

Robert Anthony Beer (8 March 1942 – 3 July 2021) was an Australian adventurer who was the first person to run across the Simpson Desert, Australia.

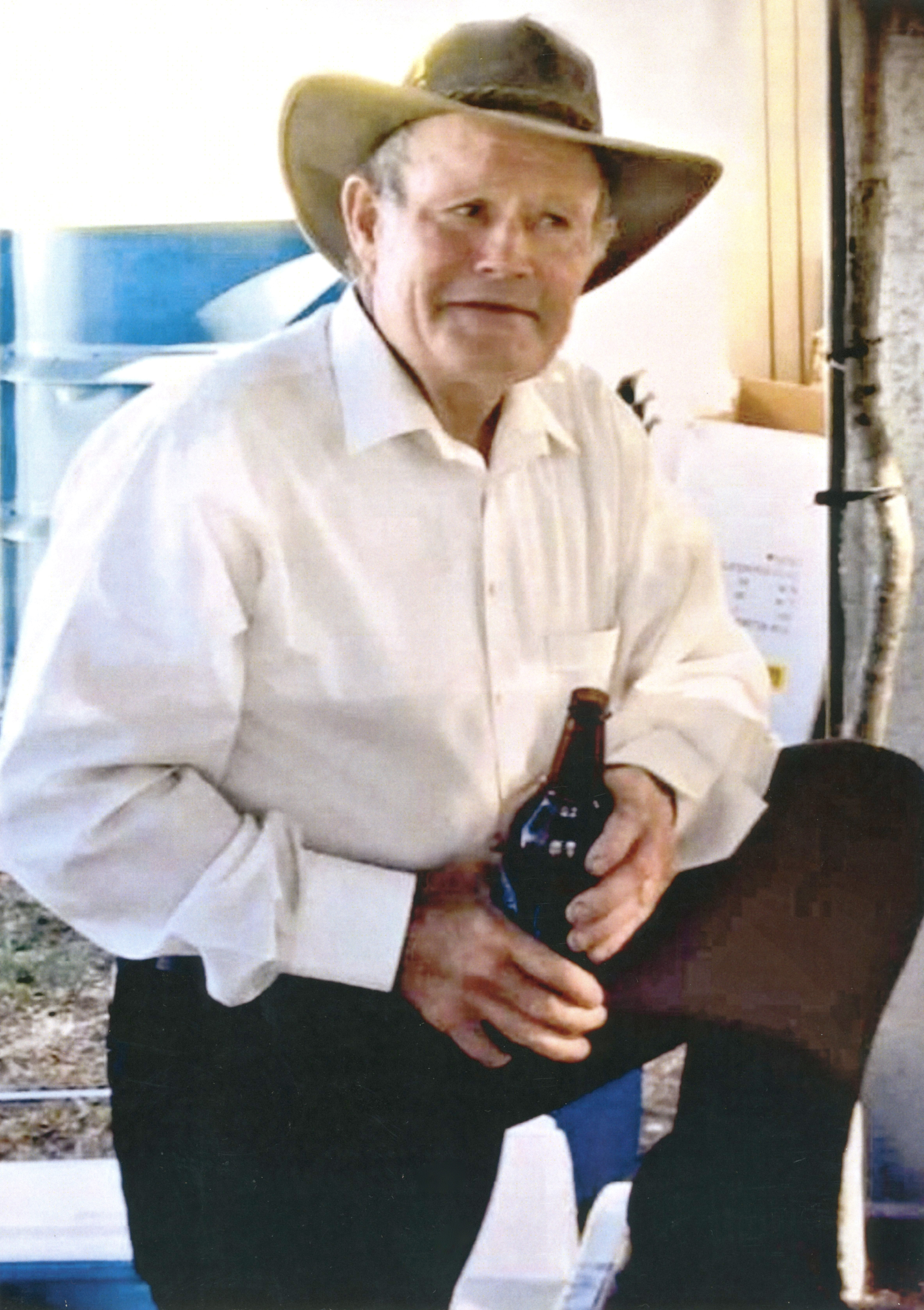

== Background ==
Beer was born in Walcha, New South Wales and grew up on a rural property, near Ingleba, New South Wales. Beer attended school in Ingleba, Walcha and Armidale. Following school, Beer was a tent fighter in Selby Moore's Boxing Tent and was known as 'The Beast'. Beer lived in New Zealand for some time and worked as a professional deer shooter. During this time Beer summited Mt Cook via the Grand Traverse. Beer also worked in Australia as a deckhand, rigger, scaffolder and various roles in construction.

== The Simpson Desert run and other adventures ==
In 1977, Beer cycled across Australia from Perth, Western Australia to Port Macquarie, New South Wales in 36 days. Beer was not assisted by a backup crew.

In 1978, Beer walked across Australia from Port Augusta, South Australia to Karumba, Queensland in 52 days. Beer was not assisted by a backup crew.

In 1980, Beer became the first person to run across the Simpson Desert, Australia. Beer ran 420 km across the desert in 6.5 days, starting at Alka Seltzer Bore, South Australia and finishing at Birdsville, Queensland. Beer was assisted by a backup crew which included adventurers, Hans Tholstrup and Neville Kennard. The trip was sponsored by Australian entrepreneur, Dick Smith. A documentary was made about this trip called "The Runner".

In 1996/1997, Beer kayaked solo across Australia from Port Alma, Queensland to Murray Mouth, South Australia. Beer paddled up the Fitzroy River and then towed his Kayak on a trolley behind a bicycle over the Great Dividing Range to Goondiwindi, Queensland. Beer then kayaked from Goondiwindi to the Murray Mouth. Beer travelled a total of 4,562 km in 146 days. Beer managed to complete the trip despite contracting Ross River fever. Beer wrote a book about this trip titled "The inland sea man: across Australia by kayak".

In 1999, Beer cycled around Australia in a figure of eight, travelling a total of 18,350 km to raise money for the Garvan Institute of Medical Research. Beer was not assisted by a backup crew.
