= Simpson Desert Bike Challenge =

Annual bike race in Australia

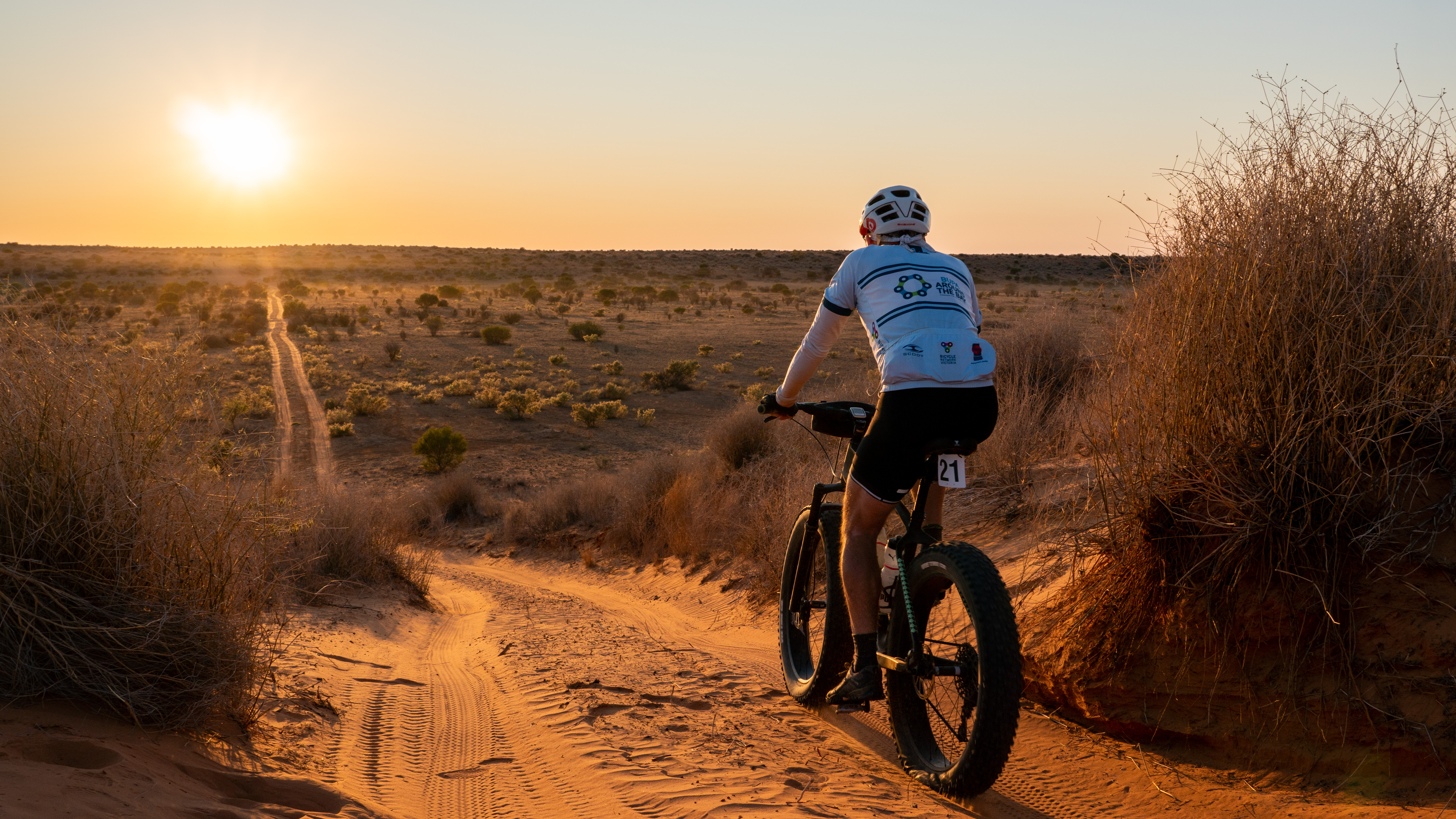
- Simpson Desert Bike Challenge competitor
- Status: Active
- Location: Simpson Desert
- Coordinates: 25.0466°S 136.7435°E
- Country: Australia
- Inaugurated: 1987
- Most recent: 2024
- Organizer: Desert Challenge Inc.
- Website: desertchallenge.org

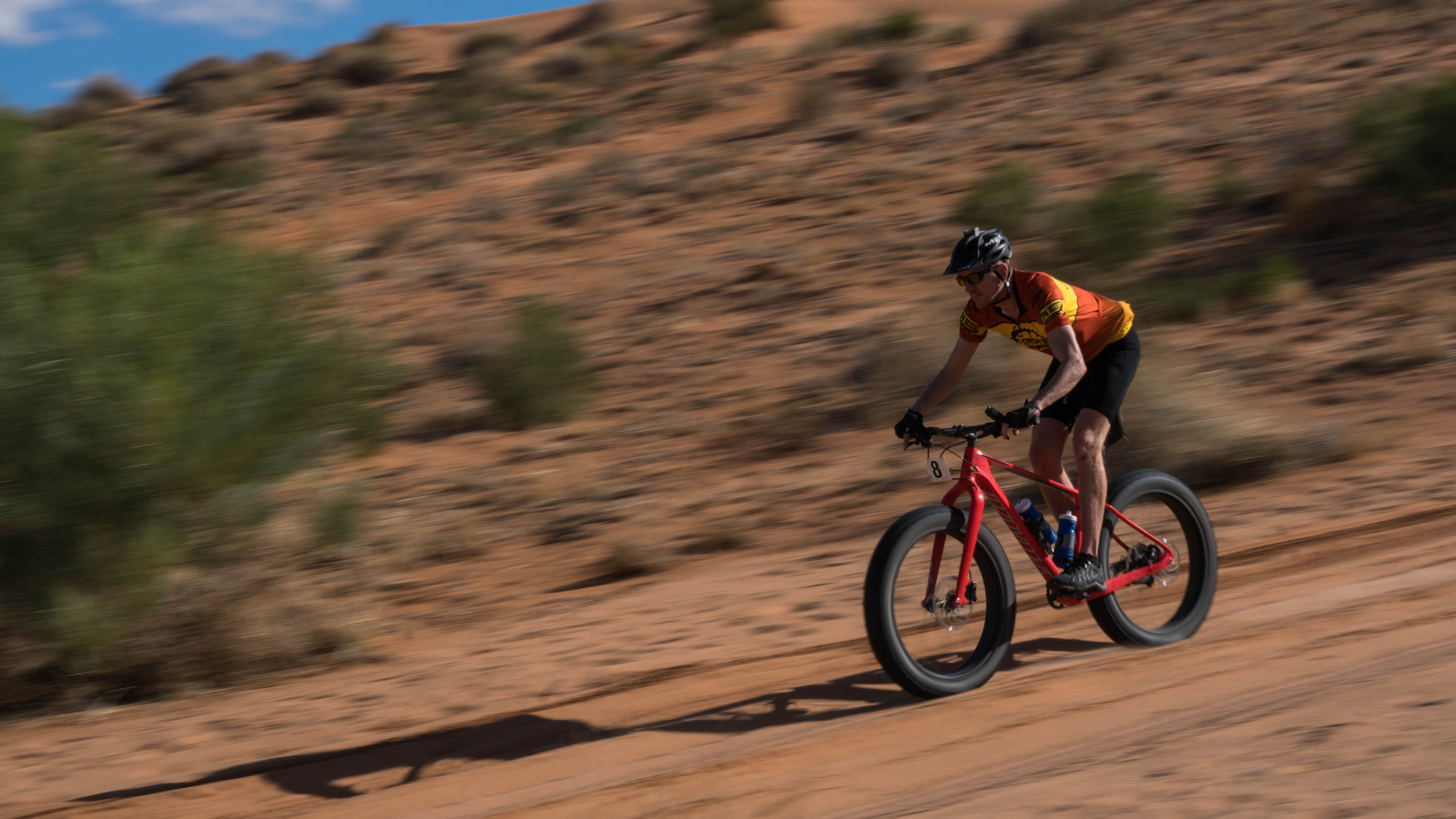
Simpson Desert Bike Challenge - Fat Bikes are the best tool to tackle the sandy tracks

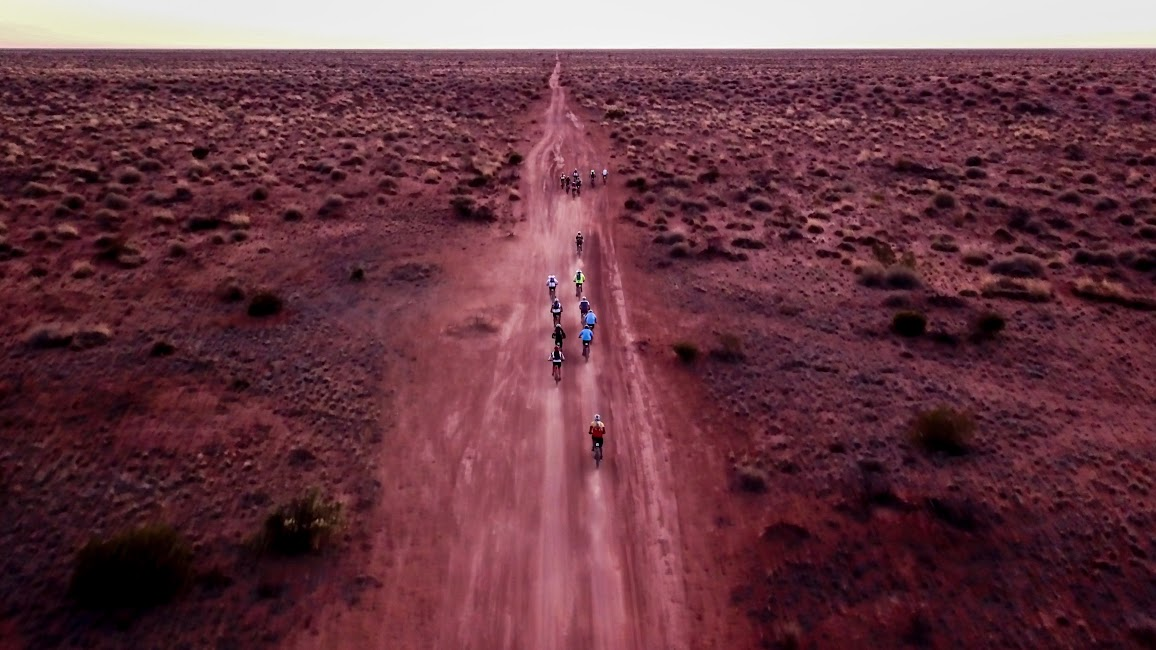
SDBC 2018 - right after the start on day 1

The Simpson Desert Bike Challenge (SDBC) is an annual staged mountain bike race held in the Simpson Desert of Australia. First held in 1987, the SDBC is run by the non-profit organisation Desert Challenge Inc

The SDBC covers between 500 and 600 kilometres and lasts five days. The times taken to finish each stage are aggregated to determine the overall winner. Although the course changes every year, the SDBC typically starts in South Australia and finishes in Birdsville, Queensland. The route takes riders and support crews through the largest parallel sand dune desert in the world.

Riders of all ages and abilities are allowed to participate. For example, past competitors have included a cop, a coffee shop owner, and an IT manager.

The SDBC is unofficially the world's longest-running mountain bike stage race. According to several endurance event rating sites, the SDBC race is one of the world's toughest endurance events.

There is no prize pool for the SDBC . All proceeds are donated to charity. Since 2008 the committee has donated the proceeds to the Royal Flying Doctor Service of Australia (RFDS) Money is raised for the RFDS through online fundraising of riders, a post-race auction, as well as donations collected during the event for (fun) fines. So far more than $312,000 have been raised by the organization, which is run by a group of volunteers and incorporated in South Australia as the non-for-profit organization Desert Challenge Inc.

== Race location and routes ==
The SDBC" crosses the Munga-Thirri–Simpson Desert National Park (proclaimed a national park on 26 November 2021, formerly Munga-Thirri—Simpson Desert Conservation Park and the Munga-Thirri-Simpson Desert Regional Reserve) a large area of dry, red sandy plain and dunes in the Northern Territory, South Australia and Queensland. The course varies from year to year as several routes have been surveyed and developed.

The SDBC it is basically a moving race village, comprising riders and their support crews, 4 wheel drive vehicles and event crew.

The race routes traverse tracks that were constructed for oil exploration in the 1970s. In wet conditions, track closures are common and the race may need to be diverted.

== Race concept and purpose ==
There are no settlements or service locations between the SDBC start and finish lines. As the event crosses protected conservation areas, it has to comply with a range of rules designed to protect the environment. The SDBC follows a format in which riders are always travelling between a front and rear convoy.

Each day, riders complete a morning and afternoon stage.

- Race distance: 485–570 km (301–354 mi)
- Race duration: 5 days (9 or 10 stages; on day five there are one or two stages)
- Stage distances: ~ 75 km morning, ~ 45 km afternoon.

Due to the significant daily distances and the requirement for riders to arrive at night camp before dark, the SDBC has a minimum speed requirement. Riders must maintain a minimum average of 12 km (7.5 mi) per hour to stay ahead of the rear convoy – which is led by the sweep vehicle. If caught by the “sweep,” riders have to take a lift to the end of that stage. Riders are allowed to restart the next stage in the afternoon or the next morning.

All riders who complete every stage of the SDBC get the “100% SDBC medal.” The average percentage of riders winning the 100% medal is 36% – although there have been years where no rider completed the course (e.g. 2008) as well as one year where no rider was swept at all (2016).

Water stops are located approximately every 20 km (12 mi) and every rider has to stop and collect water. At the start and end of every stage, the weight of each rider is recorded to manage risks related to dehydration. Beyond water stops, riders must be self-sufficient.

Medical teams are present at each water stop to monitor the physical and mental status of the riders. Support vehicles must travel in either the front convoy ahead of the riders or in the rear convoy behind the Sweep vehicle. Vehicles experiencing difficulties crossing dunes can expect prompt assistance. Regulations require each vehicle to have UHF radio and a high visibility safety flag.

== Event origins ==
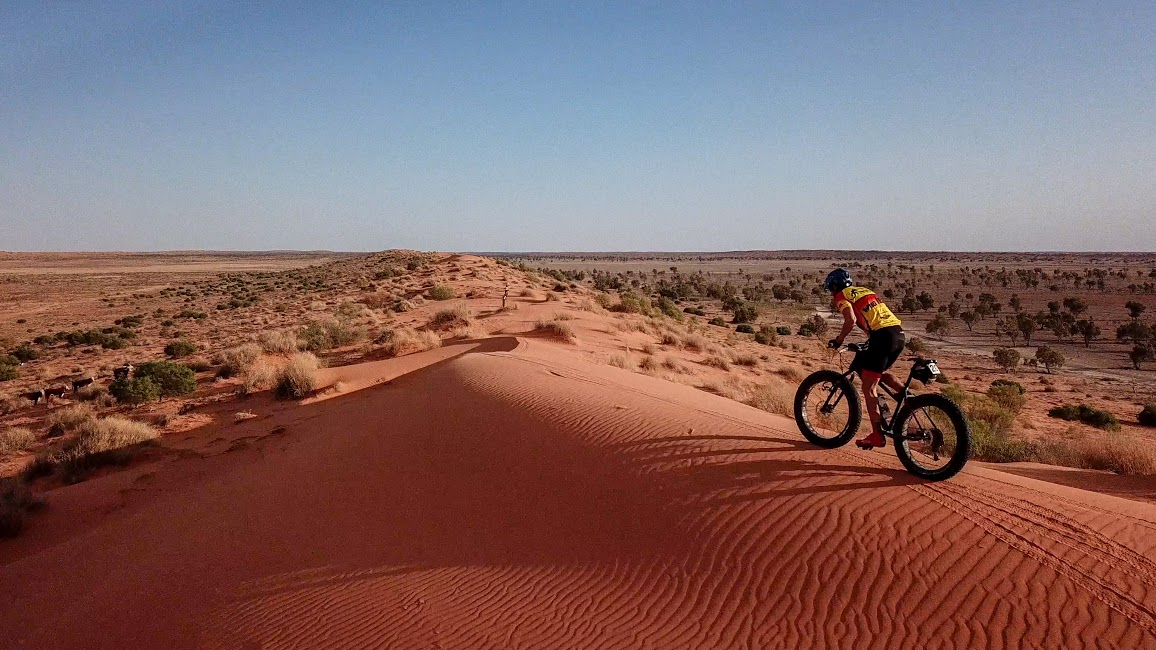
Simpson Desert Bike Challenge 2018, Day 5, Stage 9 - Riding on Big Red

In 1988, Jack and Mary Mullins organised and directed the first Simpson Desert Cycle Classic In 1988. The event raised money for the Paraquad Association.

The Mullins ran the SDBC until 1994, when Rod and Loz Townsend took it over. During those years an association with the Paraplegic Benefit Fund was created as a recipient charity. The Townsends managed the event until 2001.

In 2006 a management committee for the SDBC was elected. This committee established Desert Challenge Inc..

== Race results ==
Simpson Desert Bike Challenge - Race Winners
Year	Overall Winners			100% Finishers
Year	1st Place	2nd Place	3rd Place	No. of riders who completed all race stages / overall no. of riders
2026	Scott Reynolds	Stuart Neden	James Tranter	5/13
2025	Dale Coutts	Ben Swincer	Mark Nurmela	3/7
2024	Stuart Neden	Max Coleman	Geeb Smith	5/10
2023	Marc Fox	Benjamin Fallon	Mark Hartmann	3/12
2022	Peter Gwynne	James Tranter	Eckart Altenkamp & Malcolm Murray	14/23
2021	n/a (cancelled due to COVID-19 pandemic)			
2020	n/a (cancelled due to COVID-19 Pandemic)			
2019	Rasmus Altenkamp	Michael Liebert	Chris Baillie	5/15
2018	Derek Ragless	Eckart Altenkamp	Aurelia Strozik	6/18
2017	Eckart Altenkamp	Graham Hancox	Adam Gowlett	4/11
2016	Justin Morris	Jason Morrison	Peter Moore	20/20
2015	Paul Schroder	Peter Moore	Ollie Klein	10/20
2014	Bruce Wood	Bill Somerville	Michael Chidgey	9/20
2013	Ronn Slusser	Lynton Stretton	Chris Baillie	15/22
2012	Alan Keenleside and Murray Rook	n/a	Lynton Stretton	7/17
2011	Paul Schroder	Ken Glasco	Neil Thies	13/17
2010	Ron Whitehead	Simon Honore	Lynton Stretton	12/24
2009	Alan Keenleside	Lynton Stretton	Jason Dreggs	1/30
2008	Lynton Stretton	Warren Quinn	Heinz von Holzen	0/12
2007	Bruce Wood	Andrew Koop	Matthias Axt	2/17
2006	Ed Bourke	Heinz von Holzen	Jason Iwanow	5/11
2005	Jaap Viergever	Anthony Brattolli	John Dermody	6/24
2004	Jaap Viergever	Craig Peacock	Leon Fisher	18/30
2003	Adrian Laing	Kim Proctor	Carl Barrow	13/16
2002	Leon Fisher	Carl Barrow	Trevor Best	3/22
2001	Leon Fisher	Ed Bourke	Ian Langstaff	21/32
2000	Jack Oldfield	Ed Bourke	Michael Rueger	4/54
1999	Jack Oldfield	Ed Bourke	Ben Edols	2/41
1998	Jack Oldfield	Alun Hoggett	Lincoln Gore	6/37
1997	James Aylmer	Bob Simpson	Leon Fisher	2/44
1996	Luke Mahoney	David Cossettini	Richard Millard	22/43
1995	Richard Millard	Darren Benson	Micheal Worden	14/51
1994	Robert Eckel	Tom Landon-Smith	Novak Thompson	Unknown / 31
1993	Ian Thompson	David Austin	Mark Baker	Unknown / 15
1992	Ron Versteegh	Brett Lovell	Ian Wright	Unknown / 52
1991	Lenny Van Berkel	Ronald Versteegh	Ian Wright	Unknown / 12
1990	Peter Wood	Mal Cummack	Kevin Piercy	12/21
1989	Ross Martin	Peter Barnard	Jim Smith	Unknown / 18
1988	Greg Mickle	Danny Mariotti	Rob Bray	Unknown / 19
1987	Peter Hanson	Leon Fisher	Phil McDonald	Unknown / 30

== Event history ==
In the early years of the SDBC, riders used non-suspension mountain bikes with skinny tyres. They were forced to push their bikes over the sand dunes. The route usually ran along the Rig Road and Birdsville Track, now known as the “Classic Route”.

After 2009, many competitors started uses fat bikes. With 4+ inch wide tyres, those bikes made it possible to ride on soft sand and cross even steep dunes without having to push. Today, the event is dominated by fat bikes.

The advance in bike technology allowed SDBC organisers to choose different route options, including the French and WAA lines – which feature more challenging sand dunes than the classic route.

The climatic conditions in the desert vary from year to year. There have been extremely dry and hot years as well as wet years which did create an even more challenging set of circumstances for riders. Due to flooding and well as bush fires, there have also been years where the SDBC had to be held in alternative locations. In 2020, due to the global pandemic of COVID-19, the SDBC was cancelled for the first time.

Simpson Desert Bike Challenge History - Year by Year
Year	Description
1987	Over Easter 1987, the inaugural SDBC took place. It was organised by Hans Tholstrup and sponsored by Caltex and Friends Provident Life insurance. The course ran along the French Line, which featured deep sand for much of its length - which forced the race to be shortened to six stages. Thirty riders competed, including two women. The youngest riders were 13, riding BMX bikes; one of them finished all stages. The oldest participant was 73.
1988	Flooding in the Simpson Desert forced the relocation of the SDBC.. The start was in Kulgera and the course took riders along back roads past Uluru and finished at Kata Tjuta. Twenty-three riders competed, Nineteen riders finished the course.
1989	Eighteen riders competed.
1990	Twenty-one riders competed. Twelve riders completed the entire 575 km (357 mi).
1991	Eighteen riders competed.
1992	Conditions were wet in the desert. Many vehicles got bogged down on the way to Purni Bore, the start location. One rider took his bike to cover the last 65 km (40 mi) to the start line due to his vehicle and crew being stuck in the mud. His support crew did only arrive at Purni Bore hours before the race started. Stephan Vanderhee, #23, had several tyre punctures during the afternoon of day 3 until he ran out of spare tubes. That forced him to ride the final 30 km (19 mi) on his rims. That night, Vanderhee worked until 11 pm on his bike rims with steel wool and a file and appeared at the start line the next morning with a new tube and his original tyre still intact. Twenty-one riders completed the entire 576 km (358 mi). Fifty-three riders competed, including five women.
1993	Eighteen riders competed.
1994	Thirty-one riders competed, including three women. Twenty-nine riders completed the entire course.
1995	Fifty-one riders competed, including five women. Fifteen riders completed the entire course of 581 km.
1996	Forty-three riders competed, including five women. Twenty-two riders completed the entire course of 681 km (423 mi)
1997	The temperature reached 45 Degree Celsius on two days and the Rig Road had thick dust on the dunes. The front convoy bogged down on one dune and were overtaken by the riders. Forty-five riders competed, including five women. Two of the women riders were Japanese\. Of the men, two were Japanese, one was Canadian (who fell and broke his shoulder on the first day) and one was British. Also participating was a blind rider, Chad Towns, who followed his son on a bike with “clickers” on the spokes plus a friend following him. A “Mr. Bean” participated in his white business shirt, long army shorts, black shoes and white socks. He inspired the SDBC Mr. Bean Award. Two riders completed the entire course of 585 km (364 mi).
1998	Bob and Jayne Simpson rode a tandem bicycle. Thirty-seven riders competed, including three women. Six riders completed the entire course of 581 km (361 mi).
1999	Course: Rig Road + Outside track. The conditions were hot with significant sand drifts on top of many dunes. On day 2, only two riders got past the 40 km (25 mi) mark (Jack Oldfield and Ed Bourke). Both riders arrived at the lunch stop just before the sweep vehicle. Many vehicles got bogged down on the dunes. On day 4, a shower created muddy conditions. Bicycle wheels got jammed with heavy mud, forcing cyclists to manually remove mud from their bikes every few minutes. Some racers carried the bikes on their shoulders. The race route had to be diverted from the inner to the outer Birdsville track. Forty-one riders competed, including six women. Two riders completed the entire course of 587 km (365 mi).
2000	Course: Rig Road, K1 with the convoy to Big Red via QAA Line, then out and back on Inside track. The conditions were hot and dry. On day 3, due to water in the Warburton Crossing, the riders went up the K1 line. Day 4 saw a transport stage across the QAA line to Big Red - instead of riding. The dunes on the QAA line were too steep and sandy (for non-fat bikes). The race did finish off with an out-and-back stage on the Birdsville Inside Track on the last day. Fifty-four riders competed, including two women. Four riders completed the shorten 457 km (284 mi) course. Jack Oldfield won, his third win in a row.
2001	Course: Classic Route; Rig Road and Inside track Conditions were cool, with overnight lows of 1 degree Celsius. There was relatively little soft sand. On the afternoon of day 4 riders traversed massive cracks in the claypan on the Goyder Lagoon. One rider, Graham Butt, broke the seat on his bicycle during one of the stages He cycled the next 65 km (40 mi) standing up and eventually won a 100% medal. Thirty-two riders competed, including two women. Twenty-one riders completed the entire 592 km (368 mi) course.
2002	Course: Classic Route; Rig Road and Inside track Conditions were dry with warm temperatures. However, on the morning of day 2, sandy conditions hindered many riders. riders. The Sweep collected all but four of the 22 competitors. Twenty-two riders competed, including one woman. Three riders completed the entire distance of 593 km (368 mi)
2003	Course: Rig Road + Outside track. Race Distance was (only) 519 km (322 mi) due to shortened day 2. Conditions were relatively cool with very little soft sand.. On day 1, there was heavy rainfall on the course. The next morning, the riders were transported to the “Lone Gum”, where the race resumed. Sixteen riders competed, including two women. Thirteen riders completed the entire 519 km (322 mi).
2004	Course: Rig Road + Inside track. Race Distance was 510 km (320 mi) due to shortened day 2, 3 & 4. Conditions were cool and the track was firm due to previous rain. However, rain started on day and continued into day 3, causing very muddy and slippery conditions. Thirty riders competed, including one woman. Eighteen riders completed the entire race.
2005	Course: Rig Road + Inside track Conditions were dry and hot . However, headwind picked up on the morning of day 2 which left only 8 riders completing that very stage... with another 2 of these riders failing to get through the afternoon section. From there onwards, good conditions did allow most of the field to get through the remaining days. Twenty-four riders competed, including two women. Six riders completed the entire 587 km (365 mi)
2006	Course: Rig Road + Inside track Eleven riders competed, including one woman. Five riders achieved 100%. Several participants cancelled, including an Army contingent deployed to Afghanistan and the Air Force contingent deployed to Malaysia.
2007	Course: Rig Road + Inside track The conditions were dry and hot conditions. Large amounts of sand lay across the track. 17 riders competed, including two women, Two riders achieved 100% of 592 km (368 mi)
2008	Winds between 40 and 50 knots and temperatures up to 44 degrees Celsius created very difficult race conditions. Twelve riders competed, none achieved 100%
2009	Course: Rig Road, K1 Line, QAA Line Thirty riders competed, including three women. One rider achieved 100% of 489 km (304 mi). Alan Keenleside was the first rider to appear on a fat bike. Over $22,000 for the Royal Flying Doctors.
2010	Ongoing rains soaked the low-lying areas of the Simpson. The organisers chose an Out-and-back route in the Great Victoria Desert. The riders traveled along the Anne Beadell Highway from west of Coober Pedy (Mabel Creek Station) to Anne's Corner and back. Twenty-four riders competed, including three women. Twelve riders achieved 100% of 587 km (365 mi). First year in which several competitors use fat tyre bikes. Due to the wet conditions, the sand was firm. The fat bikes did not get a real opportunity to demonstrate their advantages on soft ground. Achieved $14,823.90 for the RFDS.
2011	SDBC was diverted due to bush fires. The organizers choose northern loop starting at Oodnadatta, via Eringa to Charlotte Waters and return via Mt Dare and Dalhousie Springs. The last stage on day 5 was a circuit loop on 4WD tracks around Oodnadatta. The Pink Roadhouse was the final location. Seventeen riders competed, 13 riders achieved 100% of 466 km (290 mi) Fat bikes made up half of the field.
2012	Course: Rig Road, K1 Line, QAA Line Conditions in the Simpson Desert were somewhat wet. The oldest rider was Lou McLaren (#16) - at 74 years of age the oldest participant yet. Sixteen riders competed (11 with fat bikes), including one woman. Seven riders achieved 100% of 572 km (355 mi) $38,000 for the Royal Flying Doctor Service.
2013	Course: Rig Road, K1 Line, QAA Line Race director Greg Roger missed the race. The experienced 4x rider and head of the medical team Leon Malzinskas were selected to replace him. Twenty-two riders completed, including two women; fifteen riders achieved 100% of 532 km (331 mi)
2014	Course: Rig Road, K1 Line, QAA Line On the afternoon of day 1, half the field was swept. Under normal conditions, stage 2 is a relatively easy run, but a headwind stopped many riders. Twenty riders competed, including two women; nine riders achieved 100% of 587 km (365 mi)
2015	Course: French & QAA Line SDBC returned to the French Line Due to relatively "easy" weather conditions (cool weather each morning, low winds, firm tracks), the front riders were consistently faster than the vehicles. The convoy heading into the desert first got quickly under the pressure of being overtaken by the bikes - which caused the organisers to delay the start of the cyclists by 1/2 hour. The 2015 field featured one rider in a traditional 26" bike and one on a 29 inch MTB tyres - the rest of the field was made up of fat bikes running on 4+ inch wide tyres. Twenty riders competed, ten achieved 100% of 488 km (303 mi).
2016	Course: French & QAA Line Moist conditions caused the tracks to be very firm and fast. Around Poeppel's Corner, the course had to be diverted due to water in the (normally dry salt) lakes. The first year ever where no rider was swept. $35,000 raised for the RFDS.
2017	Course: Classic Route (Rig Road, Warburton Crossing, Inside Birdsville Track) The first two days brought record high temperatures (49 Degree Celsius at lunch on day 2 with zero wind. A storm on day 3 brought a very cool change and rain – turning the clay pans sticky and forcing some riders to carry their bikes. The Birdsville Inside Track was so buggy that the riders had to travel the long loop to Birdsville on the Outside instead. Dr. Mal returned to the event for a record 15th time (this time again as a head medic) Eleven riders completed, four riders achieved 100% of 593 km (368 mi). $26,000 for the RFDS.
2018	Course: WAA Line, Rig Road, K1 & QAA Line Fort the first time, the course went along the WAA line, running between French Line and Rig Road. The race featured the longest daily distance in SDBC history: 144.5 km (89.8 mi) on day 2. Half the field was swept on the afternoon of day 1 and many vehicles - including the sweep – got seriously bogged. As a result, several riders - instead of being swept - did ride into the evening and arrived at night camp in complete darkness. Several riders who were swept did not arrive at camp until midnight. Eighteen riders competed, including three women and five members of the Australian Army. Six riders achieved 100% of 540 km (340 mi). Aurelia Strozik rode to 3rd place, the first woman to place on the podium of the SDBC. $40,000 for the RFDS.
2019	Course: QAA line, the French line First SDBC running from East to West, starting in Birdsville, Queensland and finishing at Mt Dare Hotel in South Australia. The race started in Birdsville with a prologue stage, then heading west towards the sunset. The race also featured a first-ever single 100 km (62 mi) stage (day 4). Riders faced steep and soft dunes. Only 30% of riders completed the route. It was the afternoon stage of day 3 which did the damage: The combination of fatigue, extreme heat and soft sand challenged all competitors with only a few managing to stay ahead of the sweep. Fifteen riders competed, including two 2 women. Five riders achieved 100% of 499.6 km (310.4 mi). Rasmus Altenkamp, age 22, was the youngest champion in SDBC history
2020	SDBC cancelled because state borders were closed due to COVID-19 pandemic.
2021	SDBC cancelled because state borders were closed due to COVID-19 pandemic.
