= Simpson Desert =

Desert in Central Australia

- Munga-Thirri
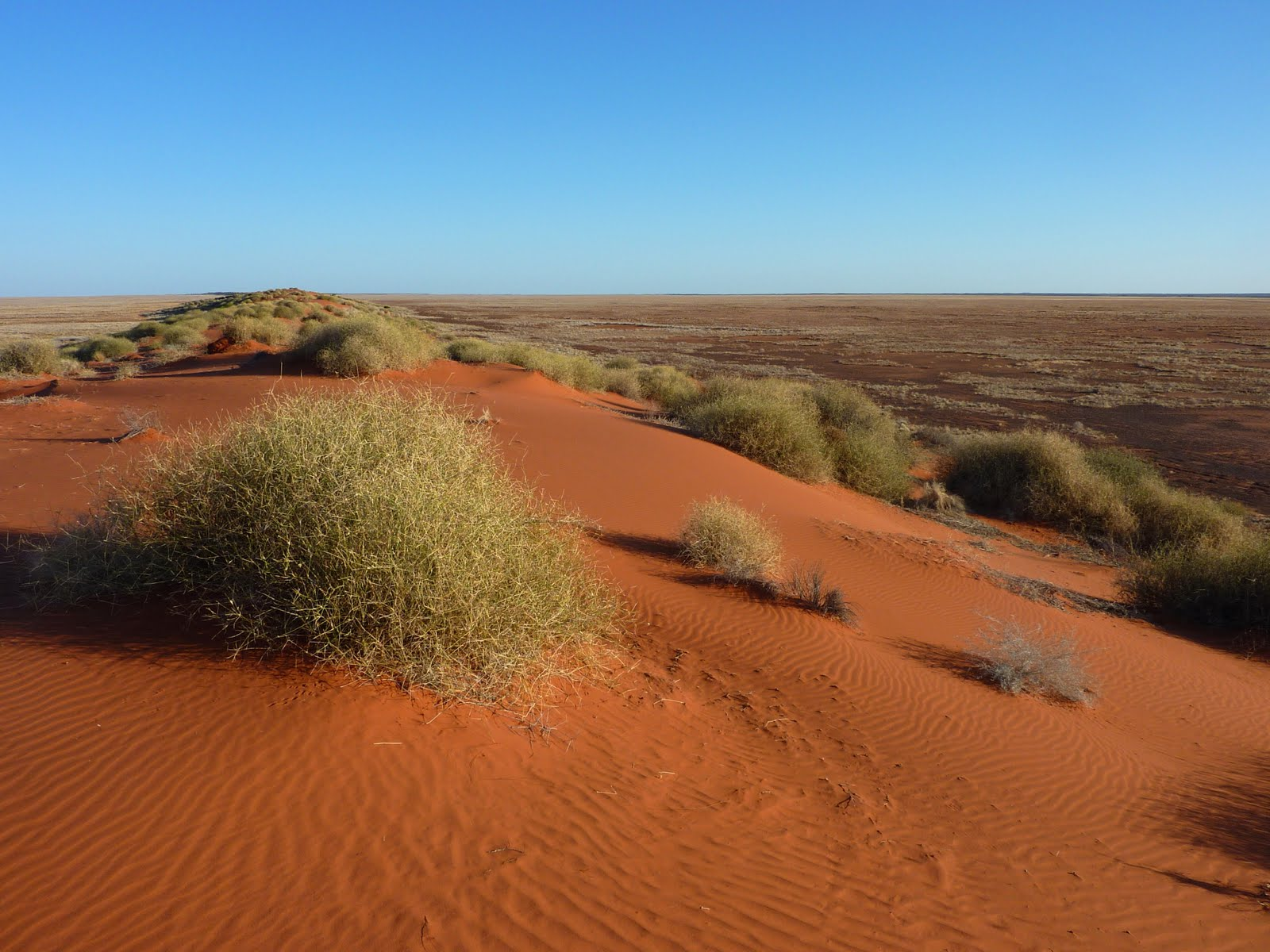
- Dunes at the edge of the Simpson Desert

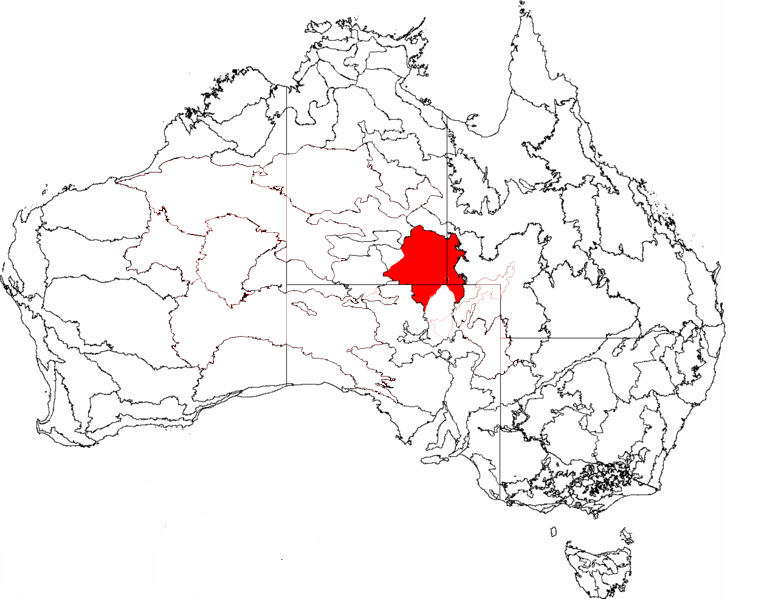
- The IBRA boundaries of the Simpson Desert
- Area: 176,500 km^{2} (68,100 mi^{2})

Geography
- Country: Australia
- States: Northern Territory; Queensland; South Australia
- Coordinates: 24.57°S 137.42°E

The Simpson Desert is a large area of dry, red sandy plain and dunes in the Northern Territory, South Australia and Queensland in central Australia. It is the fourth-largest Australian desert, with an area of 176,500 km^{2} (68,100 sq mi).

The Wangkangurru Yarluyandi people know this area as Munga-Thirri.

The desert is underlain by the Great Artesian Basin, one of the largest inland drainage areas in the world. Water from the basin rises to the surface at numerous natural springs, including Dalhousie Springs, and at bores drilled along stock routes, or during petroleum exploration. As a result of exploitation by such bores, the flow of water to springs has been steadily decreasing in recent years. It is also part of the Lake Eyre basin.

The Simpson Desert is an erg that contains the world's longest parallel sand dunes. These north-south oriented dunes are static, held in position by vegetation. They vary in height from 3 m (9.8 ft) in the west to around 30 m (98 ft) on the eastern side. The largest dune, Nappanerica or Big Red, is 40 m (130 ft) in height.

== History ==
=== Aboriginal history ===
Aboriginal peoples have lived in the Simpson Desert for at least 5000 years and continue to do so today. However, when Europeans came to the area in the late 19th century, they thought that it was an uninhabitable desert that wasn't suitable for human life. The Lower Southern Arrernte and Eastern Arrernte communities inhabited the western regions, while the Karangura and Wanggamala resided in the east. The Wangkangurru people lived in the Simpson Desert using hand-dug wells called mikiri from long before European colonization until the Federation Drought. The diet of the Aboriginal peoples in the Simpson Desert before colonization consisted of breads and seed patties made out of Nardoo (Marsilea drummondii) and Pigweed (Aizoon quadrifidum) seeds. They also hunted game as well, there being a variety of fauna to hunt, such as kangaroos, wallabies, bandicoots, hopping mice, rats native to the area, lizards, snakes, and dingoes.

=== Post-colonisation ===
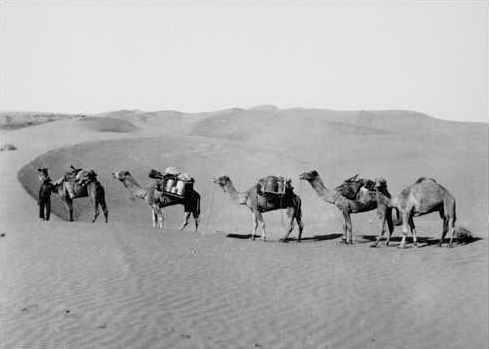
Ted Colson's expedition across the Simpson Desert in 1936

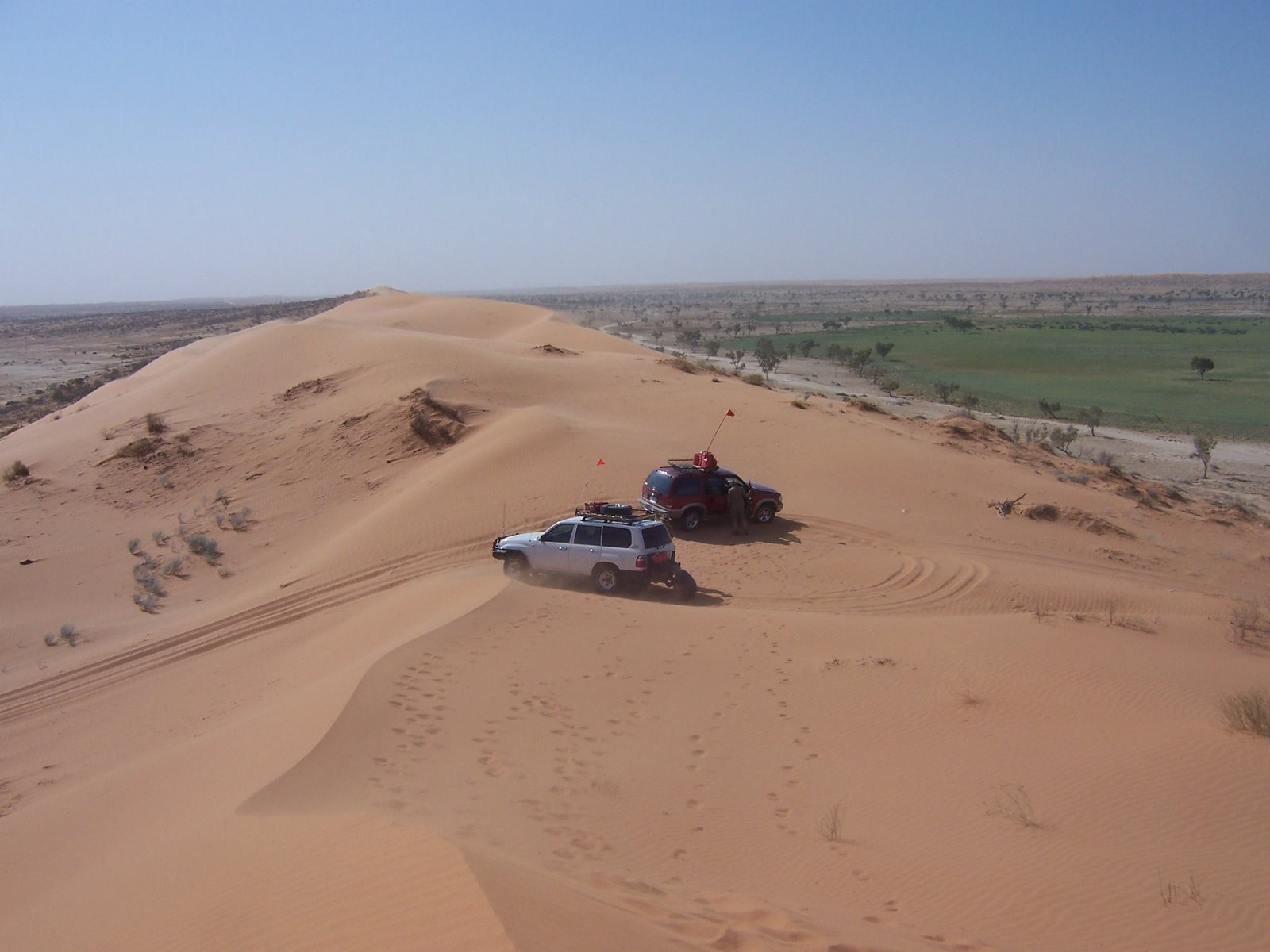
Big Red, Simpson Desert, 2007

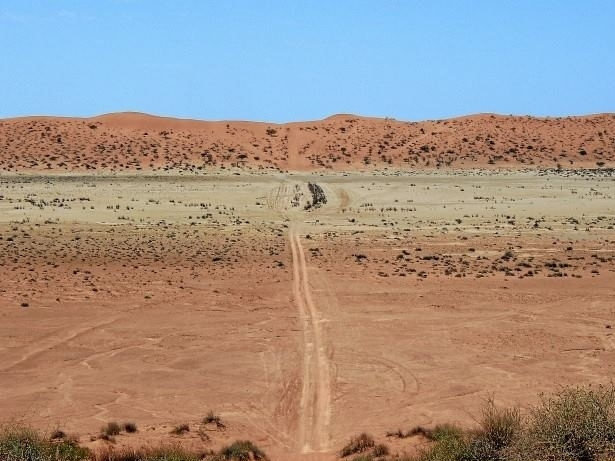
Track through the Simpson Desert

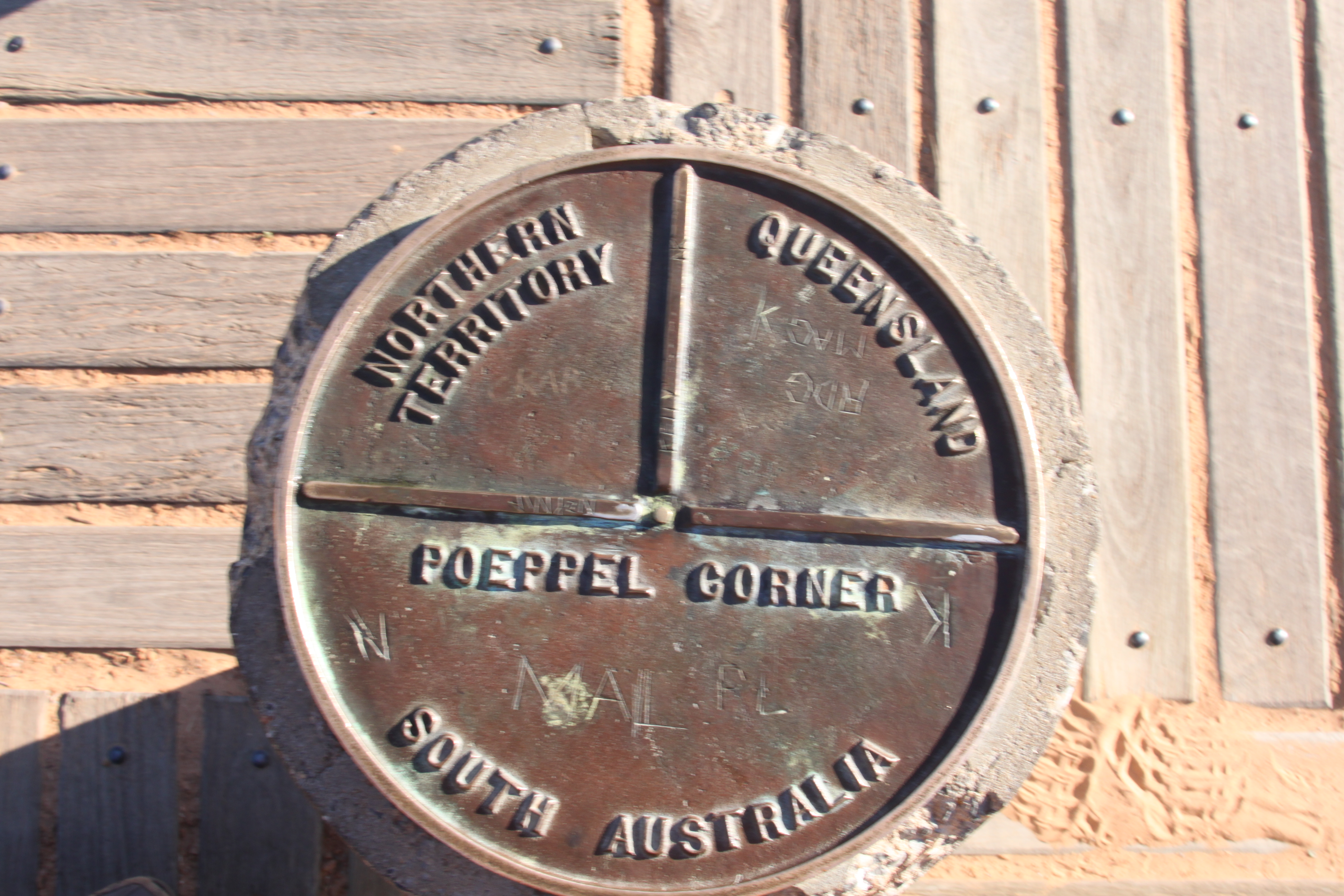
Poeppel Corner marker, South Australia, Northern Territories, Queensland

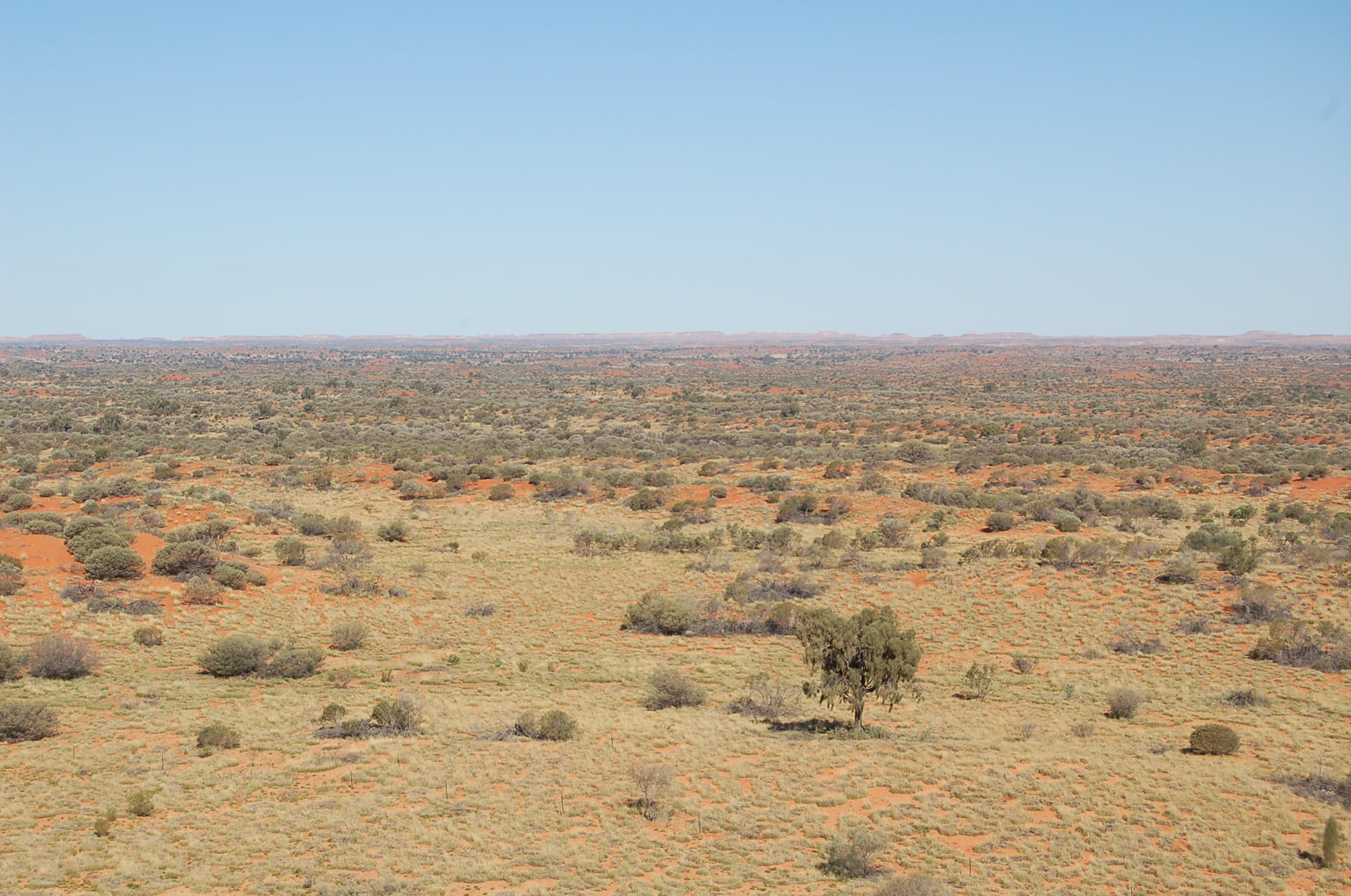
Edge of Simpson Desert from Chambers Pillar

Explorer Charles Sturt, who visited the region from 1844 to 1846, was the first European to see the desert. In 1880, Augustus Poeppel, a surveyor with the South Australian Survey Department, determined the border between Queensland and South Australia to the west of Haddon Corner, and in doing so, marked the corner point where the States of Queensland and South Australia meet the Northern Territory. After he returned to Adelaide, the links in his surveyor's chain were found to have been stretched. Poeppel's border post was too far west by 300 m. In 1884, surveyor Larry Wells moved the post to its proper position on the eastern bank of Lake Poeppel. The tristate border is now known as Poeppel Corner. In January 1886, surveyor David Lindsay ventured into the desert from the western edge, in the process discovering and documenting, with the help of a Wangkangurru Aboriginal man, 9 native wells, and travelling as far east as the Queensland/Northern Territory border.

In 1936, Ted Colson became the first nonindigenous person to cross the desert in its entirety, riding camels. The name Simpson Desert was coined by Cecil Madigan, after Alfred Allen Simpson, an Australian industrialist, philanthropist, and geographer, and president of the South Australian branch of the Royal Geographical Society of Australasia. Mr Simpson was the owner of the Simpson washing machine company.

In September 1962, geologist Reg Sprigg, his wife Griselda, and their two children completed the first vehicular crossing of the desert.

In 1980, Bob Beer became the first person to run across the Simpson. Beer ran 420 km across the desert in 6.5 days, starting at Alka Seltzer Bore, South Australia and finishing at Birdsville, Queensland. A documentary was made about this trip called “The Runner”.

In 1984, Denis Bartell was the first white man to successfully walk solo and unsupported west-to-east across the Simpson, 390 km in 24 days, relying on old Aboriginal wells for water. In 2006, Lucas Trihey was the first nonindigenous person to walk across the desert through the geographical centre away from vehicle tracks and unsupported. He carried all his equipment in a two-wheeled cart, and crossed from East Bore on the western edge of the desert to Birdsville in the east. In 2008, Michael Giacometti completed the first, and only, east-to-west walk across the Simpson Desert. Starting at Bedourie in Queensland, he walked solo and unsupported, towing all his equipment, food, and water in a two-wheeled cart to Old Andado homestead. Also in 2008, Belgian Louis-Philippe Loncke became the first non-indigenous person to complete a north–south crossing of the desert on foot, unsupported, and through the geographical centre.

In 2016, explorer Sebastian Copeland and partner Mark George completed the longest unsupported latitudinal crossing (west-to-east across the dunes) of the Simpson They linked the Madigan Line, Colson Track and French Line for the first time, walking from Old Andado homestead to Birdsville, a distance of 650 km (404 miles) in 26 days.

In 1967, the Queensland government established the Munga-Thirri National Park, formerly known as the Simpson Desert National Park.

== Access ==
No maintained roads cross the desert. The Donohue Highway is an unpaved outback track passing from near Boulia towards the Northern Territory border in the north of the desert. Some tracks were created during seismic surveys in the search for gas and oil during the 1960s and 1970s. These include the French Line, the Rig Road, and the QAA Line. Such tracks are still navigable by well-equipped four-wheel drive vehicles that must carry extra fuel and water. Towns providing access to the South Australian edge of the Simpson Desert include Innamincka to the south and Oodnadatta to the southwest; and from the eastern (Queensland) side include Birdsville, Bedourie, Thargomindah, and Windorah. The last fuel on the western side is at the Mount Dare hotel and store. Before 1980, a section of the Commonwealth Railways Central Australian line passed along the western side of the Simpson Desert. The less travelled Madigan Line runs from Old Andado Station to Birdsville. The geographic centre of the desert can be reached by driving 80 km north from the French Line via the Centre Line. The French Line is the most popular track used to cross the Simpson Desert. Most people chose to cross from west to east as prevailing winds assist in the crossing and the west sides of the dunes are less steep making ascents easier.

=== Pmere Atherre Antenterreme Indigenous Protected Area ===
IPA is an Australian government program that provides resources for Aboriginal people who oversee their land. Since 1997 the program has expanded to support 96 IPAs, including the Simpson Desert IPA. The new Pmere Atherre Antenterreme/Simpson Desert Indigenous Protected Area covers 47,311 square kilometres.

== Visitor attractions ==
The desert is popular with tourists, particularly in winter, and popular landmarks include the ruins and mound springs at Dalhousie Springs, Purnie Bore wetlands, Approdinna Attora Knoll and Poeppel Corner (where Queensland, South Australia and the Northern Territory meet). Because of the excessive heat and inadequately experienced drivers attempting to access the desert in the past, the Department of Environment & Natural Resources has decided since 2008–2009 to close the Simpson Desert during the summer – to save unprepared "adventurers" from themselves.

Another attraction is the Big Red Bash, which is billed as the most remote music festival on Earth. The event features concerts and a Big Red Bash drag race across sand dunes to raise money for the Royal Flying Doctor Service.

The desert can also be crossed by bicycle. The Simpson Desert Bike Challenge crosses the Simpson Desert every year in September.

== Climate ==
The area has an extremely hot, dry desert climate. Rainfall is minimal, averaging only about 150 mm per year and falling mainly in summer. The average summer temperature in the desert is 28 degrees Celsius and it can go as high as 50 degrees. Large sand storms are common. Winters are generally cool, but heatwaves even in the middle of July are not unheard of.

Some of the heaviest rain in decades occurred during 2009–2010, and caused the Simpson Desert to burst into life and colour. In early March 2010, Birdsville recorded more rain in 24 hours than is usual in a whole year. Rain inundated Queensland's north-west and Gulf regions. In total, 17 million megalitres of water entered the State's western river systems, leading to Lake Eyre. In 2010, researchers uncovered the courses of ancient river systems under the desert.

== Ecology ==
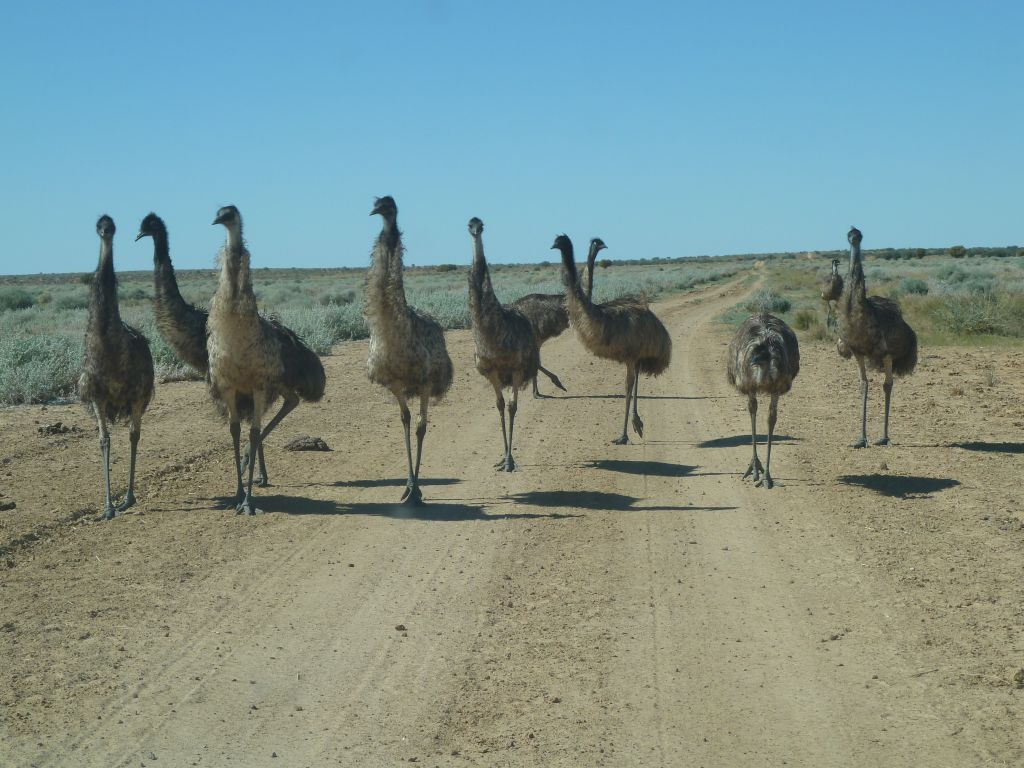
Emus in Simpson Desert

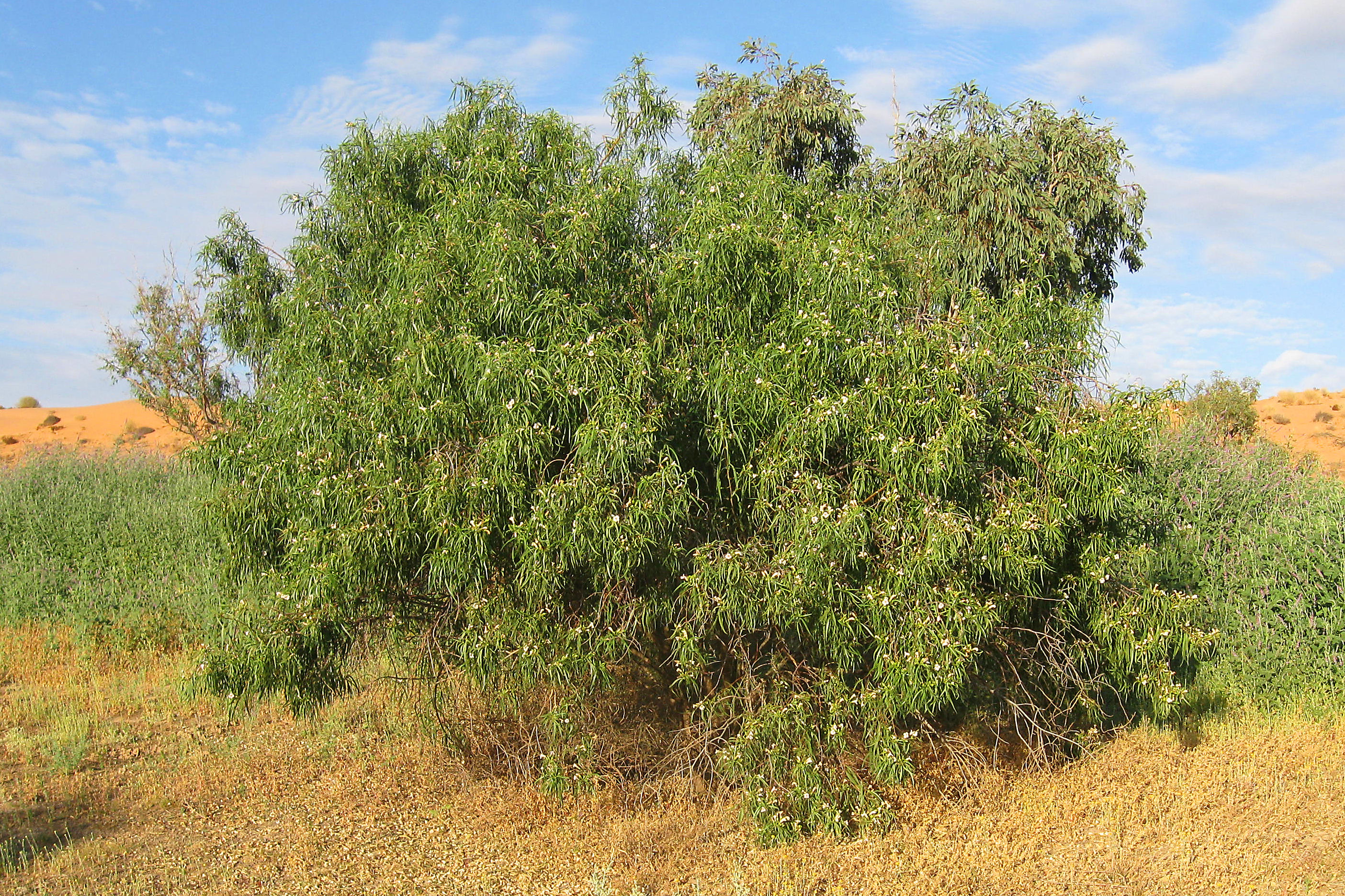
Emu bush growing in the desert

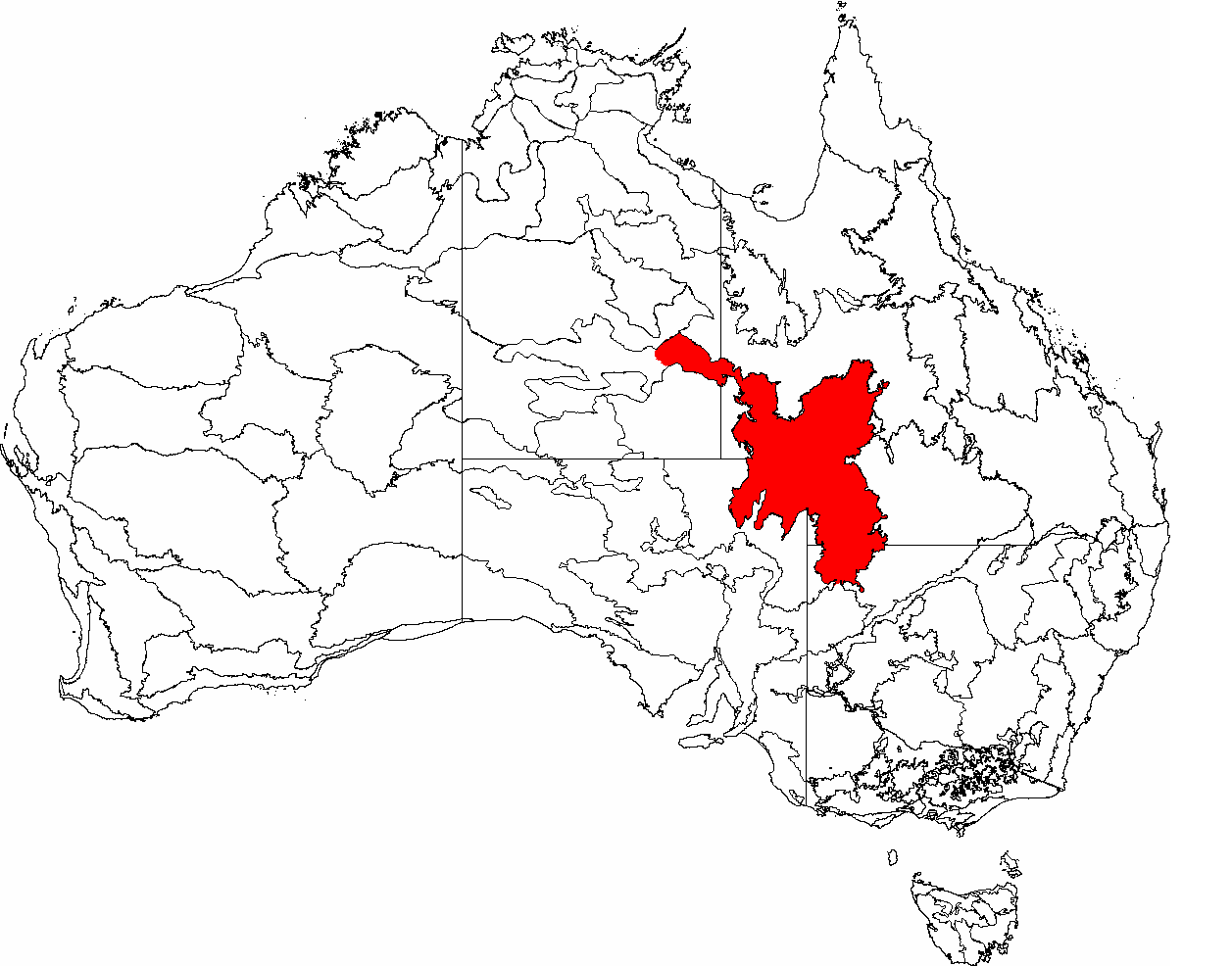
The IBRA regions, with the Channel Country in red

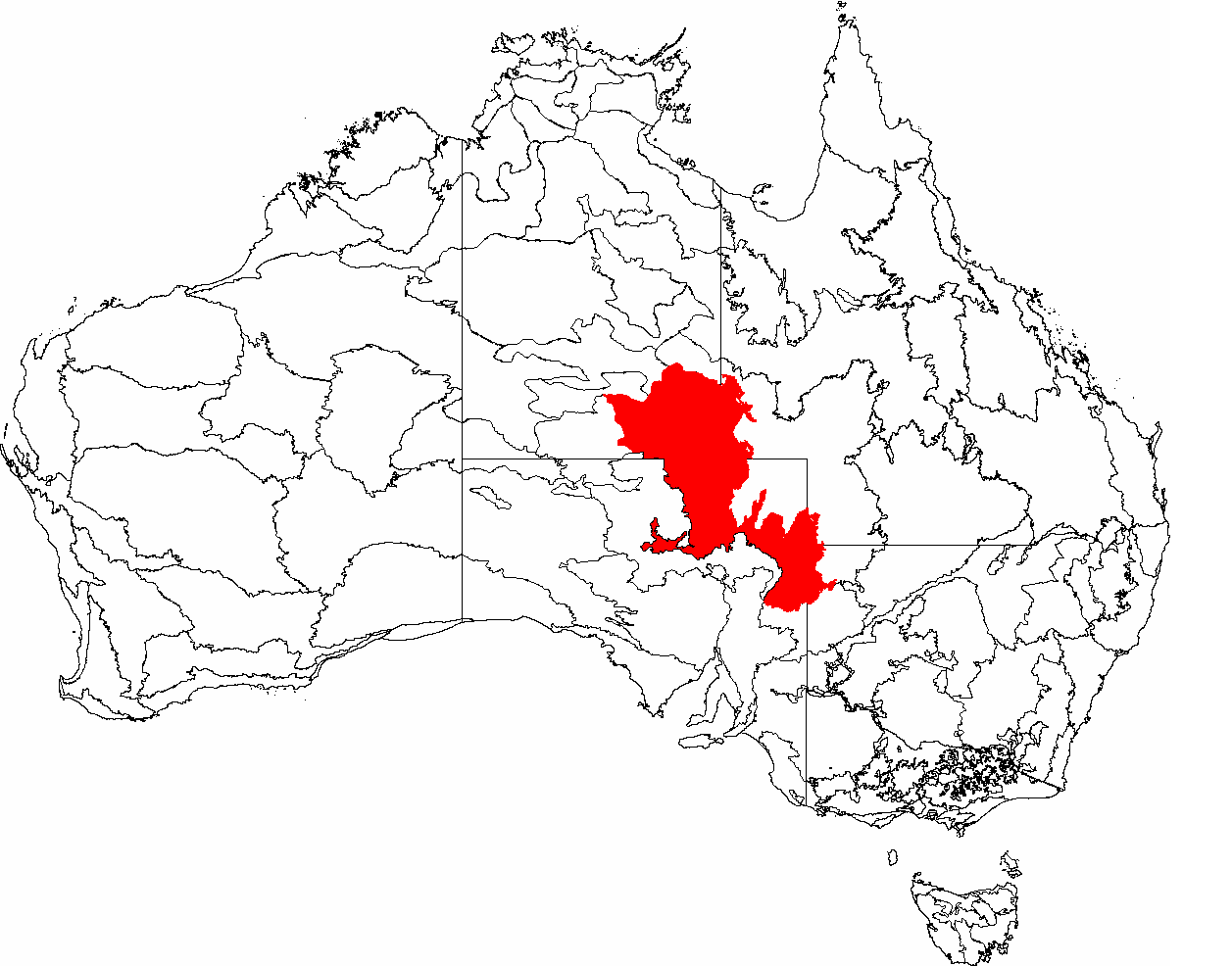
The IBRA regions, with the Simpson-Strzelecki Dunefields in red

The Simpson Desert is also a large part of the World Wildlife Fund ecoregion of the same name, which consists of the Channel Country and the Simpson Strzelecki Dunefields bioregions of the Interim Biogeographic Regionalisation for Australia (IBRA).

The flora of the Simpson Desert ecoregion is limited to drought-resistant shrubs and grasses, especially Zygochloa paradoxa grass that holds the dunes together and the spinifex and other tough grasses of side slopes and sandy desert floor between the dunes. The Channel Country section of the ecoregion lies to the northeast of the desert proper around the towns of Bedourie and Windorah in Queensland, and consists of low hills covered with Mitchell grass cut through with rivers lined with coolabah trees. The ecoregion also includes areas of rocky upland and seasonally wet clay and salt pans, particularly Lake Eyre, the centre of one of the largest inland drainage systems in the world, including the Georgina and Diamantina Rivers.

Wildlife adapted to this hot, dry environment and seasonal flooding includes the water-holding frog (Litoria platycephala) and a number of reptiles that inhabit the desert grasses such as the perentie. Endemic mammals of the desert include the red kangaroo, dingo, echidna and kowari (Dasycercus byrnei), while birds include the grey grasswren (Amytornis barbatus) and Eyrean grasswren (Amytornis goyderi). Lake Eyre and the other seasonal wetlands are important habitats for fish and birds, especially as a breeding ground for waterbirds, while the rivers are home to birds, bats, and frogs. The seasonal wetlands of the ecoregion include Lake Eyre and the Coongie Lakes, as well as the swamps that emerge when Cooper Creek, Strzelecki Creek, and the Diamantina River are in flood. The birds that use these wetlands include the freckled duck (Stictonetta naevosa), musk duck (Biziura lobata), silver gull (Larus novaehollandiae), Australian pelican (Pelecanus conspicillatus), great egret (Ardea alba), glossy ibis (Plegadis falcinellus), and banded stilt (Cladorhynchus leucocephalus). Also, the mound springs of the Great Artesian Basin are important habitat for a number of plants, fish, snails, and other invertebrates.

Native vegetation is largely intact as the desert is uninhabitable, so habitats are not threatened by agriculture, but are damaged by introduced species, particularly rabbits and feral camels. The only human activity in the desert proper has been the construction of the gas pipelines, while the country on its fringes has been used for cattle grazing and contains towns such as Innamincka. Mound springs and other waterholes are vulnerable to overuse and damage. Protected areas of the ecoregion include the Simpson Desert, Goneaway, Lochern, Bladensburg, Witjira and Kati Thanda-Lake Eyre National Parks as well as the Innamincka Regional Reserve, and the Munga-Thirri–Simpson Desert National Park.

Ethabuka Reserve is a nature reserve in the north of the desert owned and managed by Bush Heritage Australia.

== Dunefields ==
The extensive dunefields of the Simpson Desert display a range of colours from brilliant white to dark red, and include pinks and oranges.

=== Morphology ===
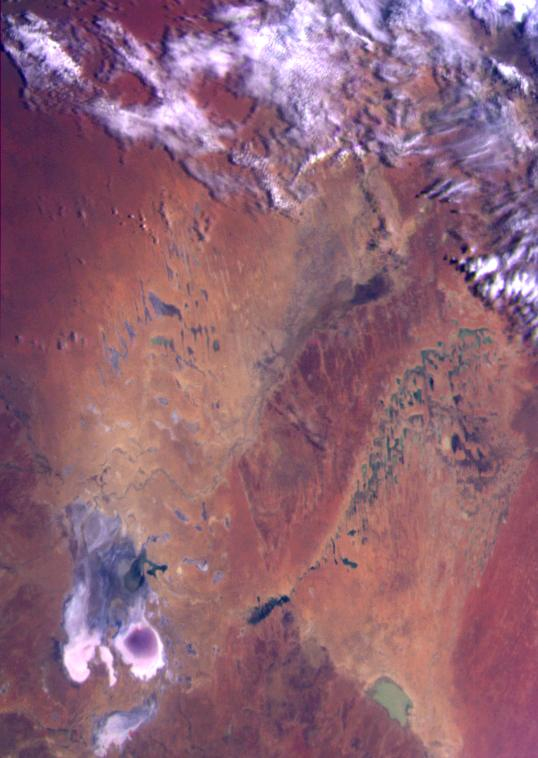
Simpson Desert visible dune lines and Lake Eyre at bottom left

The sand ridges have a trend of SSE-NNW and continue parallel for great distances. This pattern is seen throughout the deserts of Australia. Some of the ridges continue unbroken for up to 200 km. The height and the spacing between the ridges are directly related. Where five to six ridges occur in 1 km, the dune height is around 15 m, but when only one or two ridges occur in 1 km, the height jumps to 35–38 m. In cross section, the lee side is the eastern slope with an incline of 34-38°, while the stoss side is the western slope with an incline of only 10-20°. In cross section, the cross beds are planar with foresets alternating between east and west. The foresets have incline angles of 10-30°.

=== Sediment ===
The sand is predominately made up of quartz grains, which are rounded and subangular. They range in size from 0.05 to 1.2 mm with 0.5 mm being the typical size for the crests and 0.3 mm being the average size on the dune flanks. The active crests have sand sediment, but on the interdunes, the sediment is not as well sorted. The sediment varies in colour from pink to brick red, but by the rivers and playas, the sediment colour is light grey. The progression of the colour from grey to red is due to the release of iron oxide from the sediment when weathered.

== See also ==
- Australasian realm
- Ecoregions of Australia
- List of deserts by area
- Simpson Desert Important Bird Area
- Colson Track
- Hay River Track
