= Sundown murders =

Murders of three people in Australia in 1957

The Sundown murders were the murders of Sally (Thyra) Bowman (43), her daughter Wendy Bowman (14), and family friend Thomas Whelan (22) on Sundown Station in northern South Australia outback in December 1957. The search for their killer was one of the biggest manhunts in South Australian history.

== Murders ==
Pete and Sally Bowman with their two daughters Wendy and Marion managed Glen Helen station in the Northern Territory. In November 1957, a family friend named Thomas Whelan (22) travelled north to visit the family while on holiday. The Bowmans agreed to travel with Whelan back to Adelaide via Alice Springs by car. After arriving in Alice Springs on 4 December 1957, Pete and Marion took a plane and flew to Adelaide.

The remaining three travelled by car, with two family dogs. They had £85 in cash and were last spotted at Kulgera Homestead near the South Australian border, where the party purchased petrol. They then continued south towards Adelaide, but never arrived.

A huge ground search was launched, with both bosses and workers from nearby properties joining in. Eight days later, the vehicle was spotted by a Royal Australian Air Force aircrew under a clump of trees at the deserted Sundown Station.

Reaching the car some hours later, Aboriginal trackers found the bodies. All three victims had been beaten about the head and then shot. The trackers also found the spot where the killer had parked his car. They noted that the car was towing a two-wheel trailer. First reports announced that witnesses had seen a grey Ford Zephyr towing a green trailer travelling north to Alice Springs in the area around the time of the slayings. The car was later sighted east of Tennant Creek. Finke police and trackers played an important part in the murder investigation.

The prosecution case is as follows.

Mr. Scarfe said that what really happened might never be known. He suggested, however, that Raymond John Bailey held up the Bowman party at gunpoint and demanded money for petrol for the journey to Mount Isa, 1,000 miles away. Whelan went for his gun and was shot in the back. Bailey then clubbed the women with Whelan's gun (a Remington), put the bodies in the Bowman's Vanguard and drove to the opposite side of the road to hide them. He helped himself to Whelan's wallet before he hid the bodies. "Petrol is dear up in that neck of the woods and Bailey's old car and caravan would not be doing more than 10 or 12 miles to the gallon." Mr. Scarfe said.

== The accused ==
Raymond John Bailey
- Born: 3 December 1932; Gilgandra, New South Wales, Australia
- Died: 25 June 1958 (aged 25); Adelaide Gaol, Thebarton, South Australia, Australia
- Cause of death: Execution by hanging
- Other name: Raymond Carter
- Occupation: Carpenter
- Status: Executed
- Conviction: Murder
- Penalty: Death

Details
- Victims: Sally Bowman, 43; Wendy Bowman, 14; Thomas Whelan, 22
- Date: 5 December 1957
- Date apprehended: January 1958

Raymond John Bailey was born at Gilgandra on 3 December 1932. He had four brothers and a sister. Bailey left school at 14 and got work as a carpenter. He married young and worked for a time as an itinerant worker. He purchased a black 1938 DeSoto in Renmark in September 1957 and took a rifle he had agreed to buy but never paid for in Wirrulla.

Bailey was travelling north in the DeSoto car and caravan with his wife and young son. Bailey had told another traveller on the Alice Springs road that he was heading north looking for work.

He was working at Mount Isa Hospital, Mount Isa, Queensland, when the law caught up with him. Bailey was arrested in Mount Isa in January 1958 on charges of false pretences in relation of a motor vehicle and being in possession of an unlicensed weapon. Two days later he was charged with the murder of Thyra Bowman. He was extradited to Adelaide where he stood trial.

== Trial ==
The trial took place in Adelaide.

David Iles met Bailey when both men worked around Wirrulla, South Australia, in September 1957. Bailey and Iles struck up a friendship and the men went rabbit shooting. Iles later agreed to sell to Bailey his huntsman rifle but Bailey skipped town without paying for it. Iles took Constable Grope to the spot where the men fired the rifle and Grope recovered used cartridge cases. The cartridges later matched cartridges found at the murder scene.

Bailey was tried, convicted and executed in Adelaide Gaol. He was hanged on 24 June 1958. His two brothers had visited him the day before.

== Stay of execution ==
Bailey managed to get a stay of execution of one week by claiming that he was not the trio's killer but he himself killed the real killer in self-defence. The State Cabinet made a decision to test the accuracy of Bailey's new statement. The police flew Bailey back to the scene of the crime to see if Bailey could produce a body. Bailey and a fourteen-man team of police trackers, lawyers and gaol wardens flew to Alice Springs then drove south to the crime scene at Sundown Station. Bailey's story was that on the night of the murders he came across a man removing Mrs Bowman's shoes and after a fight he stabbed the man to death and then buried the man 4 miles (6.4 km) north of where the victims' bodies were found. After a three-and-a-half-hour search found no body, Bailey stated, "I have nothing more to say."

== Later investigations ==
Author and investigative journalist Stephen Bishop claims that detective Glen Patrick Hallahan lied on oath and in records of police interviews with Raymond Bailey. Detective Hallahan was one of the three high-ranking Queensland detectives known as the "Rat Pack" who had been exposed as corrupt by the Fitzgerald Inquiry in the late 1980s.

The main points that Bishop advanced included that the murder weapon, which Bailey claimed he had sold to a man near Coober Pedy before the murders, was never found. The description of the murders in Bailey's confession contradicted the post mortem results. Bailey claimed to have shot all three of the victims as they ran from him; however, the autopsies indicated that the Bowmans and Whelan were shot while lying on the ground unconscious. During his trial, Bailey claimed that he had only signed the confession after hearing his wife crying in another room. Bailey told the court that detectives then told him that they would leave her alone if he signed. A grey Ford Zephyr was seen near the murder scene while Bailey drove a black 1938 DeSoto. Footprints believed to belong to the killer had been found at the murder scene, and were estimated as being a size 7 or 8. Bailey wore a size 5½ shoe.

In February 2013, Bishop appealed to the Governor of South Australia, Kevin Scarce, to grant a posthumous pardon for Bailey, but was declined.
