= Death of Yokununna =

1934 killing of an Aboriginal man in Australia

Yokununna or Yukun (died 13 October 1934) was an Aṉangu Pitjantjatjara man who was shot and killed in 1934 by mounted constable William (Bill) McKinnon at Uluru, Northern Territory, Australia. His family emphasise that his name was "Yukun", and that in Pitjantjatjara, Yukunngana would mean "I am Yukun." However, his name has historically been recorded as "Yokununna", much to the frustration of family.

His death led to the 1935 Commonwealth Board of Enquiry into the alleged ill-treatment of Aborigines near Ayers Rock.

== Death ==
In August 1934 McKinnon, alongside Aboriginal trackers Paddy and Carbine, was sent to investigate the killing of an Aboriginal man, Kai Umen, near Mount Conner. Kai Umen was a station hand who had been killed for breaking tribal law. A few weeks into his search they came across Yukun, and five other men, who were travelling in a different direction to the murder and were highly unlikely to be involved, despite this they were questioned and detained.

Two of the other men were Paddy Uluru and Joseph Donald.

A week later the men escaped and Yokununna was shot by Paddy. Two of the men were recaptured but the others, including the badly wounded Yukun, took shelter in a cave within Uluru. This cave was 40 metres from the base of Uluru and nearby to Mutijulu Waterhole. On 13 October 1934, McKinnon shot Yukun within the cave and wrote in official reports that he shot at some distance, not aiming to hit him, though his personal journals (found in 2019) contradict this. Within these journals McKinnon admits that he fired directly at Yukun.

The surviving men were taken in for trial and sentencing in February of 1935. One of these men, Joseph Donald, returned to his family and told them the story. He later recounted it to filmmaker David Batty (Rebel Films) in 1986 who took a recording of it.

Yukun was then buried near the waterhole but his body was later exhumed and removed from the site for the Board of Enquiry.

== Board of Enquiry ==
The killing of Yukun led to the Commonwealth Board of Enquiry into the alleged ill-treatment of Aborigines near Ayers Rock led by Charles Mountford who was appointed by the Governor-General on 8 May 1935. This is sometimes known as the 1935 Cleland Enquiry. The purpose of this enquiry was not only to investigate the death of Yukun but also charges of 'ill-treatment' against Aboriginal people at Hermannsburg Mission; McKinnon was implicated in both incidents.

During the enquiry the Board took evidence at a number of locations including Uluru, Hermannsburg and Alice Springs and McKinnon accompanied the party and conducted his own defence. T. G. H. Strehlow was also a part of the enquiry and acted as interpreter for them. Strehlow recorded the exhumation of the remains in his diary:

The body of Jokanana [Yokununna] was exhumed by McKinnon, White and the Professor this morning and will be taken back by the Professor... Saw the scene of the final tragedy today. I was greatly shocked by the way in which poor Jokanana met his death – a poor, hunted creature, shot callously at least twice in the cave, without being able to defend his life or escape. And now he is being taken back – his bones and head wrapped up in calico parcel; his vitals, lungs, blood, entrails, liquefying flesh in a large billy can. And that is permitted by our white man’s civilisation

— T. G. H. Strehlow, diary entry, 12 June 1935

The Board found McKinnon not guilty of the killing but found that the “shooting of Yokununna […] though legally justified, was not warranted”. He was found guilty of violence towards the men. Mountford was angered by this finding and believed it to be unjust.

McKinnon was able to continue in his role within the police and was promoted to senior inspector in 1951.

== Return of remains ==
After the Board of Enquiry Yukun's remains were sent to the University of Adelaide by John Burton Cleland, the chairman of the Board of Enquiry, and his skull was inked 'Yockanunna [sic]. Complete Skeleton'. In 2017 the remains were transferred to the South Australian Museum; at some point the skull was separated from the postcranial remains which are now unprovenanced.

The skull of Yukun was returned (repatriated) to Uluru on 13 October 2022 (the 88th anniversary of his death); more than 100 people gathered and he was buried close to the Mutijulu Waterhole.

== Legacy ==
Comparisons have been drawn between the deaths of Yukun and Kumanjayi Walker.

== Resources ==
The story of McKinnon's killing of Yukun is detailed in Australian historian Mark McKenna's book, Return to Uluru: a killing, a hidden history, a story that goes to the heart of the nation (2021) published by Black Inc.

This book was the winner of the 2022 Chief Minister's Northern Territory History Book Awards and was shortlisted for the 2022 Prime Minister's Literary Awards.

The family's experience throughout the repatriation has also been documented

== See also ==
- List of Indigenous Australian historical figures
