= Olive Pink Botanic Garden =

Botanical garden in Alice Springs, Northern Territory

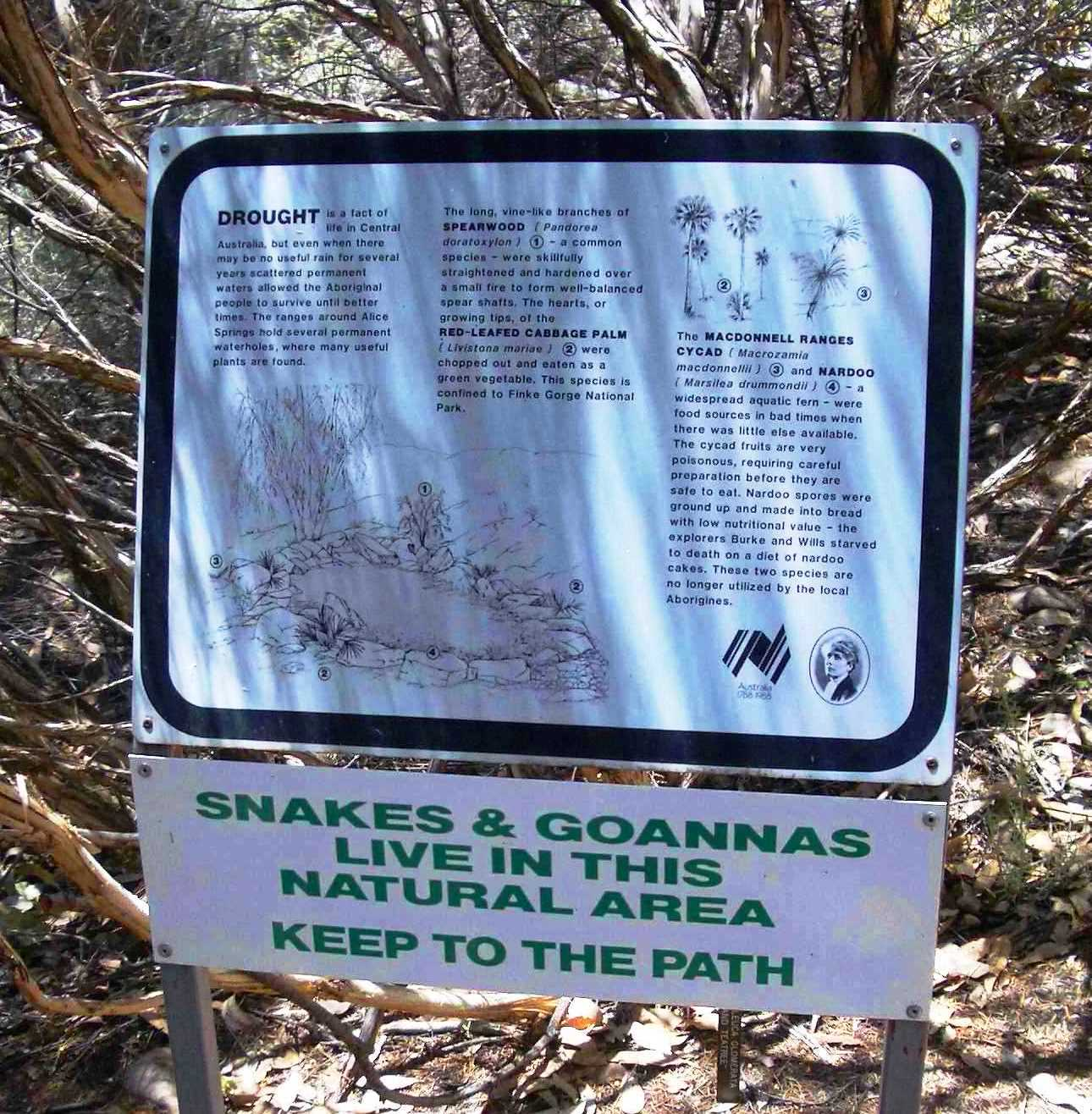
- Snakes and Goannas sign in Olive Pink Botanic Garden
- Interactive map of Olive Pink Botanic Garden
- Location: Alice Springs, Northern Territory
- Coordinates: 23.7064°S 133.8849°E
- Area: 16 hectares (40 acres)

Olive Pink Botanic Garden is a 16-hectare (40-acre) botanic garden in Alice Springs in the Northern Territory of Australia, specialising in plants native to the arid central Australian region.

== History ==
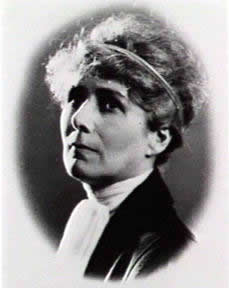
Olive Pink, founder of the garden

The 16 ha area that is now Olive Pink Botanic Garden was gazetted in 1956 as the Australian Arid Regions Flora Reserve after intense lobbying by the garden's founder, and first honorary curator, Olive Muriel Pink.

The garden is part of a substantial area of contiguous Crown Land that extends east from the Todd River on the southern edge of Alice Springs' central business district. Prior to 1956, the land was unoccupied and grazed variously by feral goat, rabbit, and cattle populations, such that the vegetation on the floodplain was substantially modified and devoid of tree and shrub cover when Pink took up occupancy there in 1956.

Pink, with her Warlpiri assistant gardeners, spent the next two decades battling drought conditions and almost non-existent operational funding to develop her vision for the reserve. Together they planted a somewhat eclectic collection of trees and shrubs native to the central Australian region as well as various cacti, garden flowers, and introduced trees around Home Hut that could withstand the harsh summers. This beautiful garden is located in the mid of Alice Springs, famous for its native plants, and many species of animals.

After Pink's death in 1975, the Northern Territory Government assumed control of the reserve and set about fulfilling Miss Pink's vision of a public area for the appreciation of native flora. During the next decade networks of walking tracks were put in place, the visitor centre built, extensive plantings of mulga, red gums and various other tree species established, a waterhole and sand dune habitat created, and an interpretive display installed.

The garden opened to the public in 1985 as the Olive Pink Flora Reserve, and was renamed Olive Pink Botanic Garden in 1996. The garden is managed by a voluntary board of trustees which has employed a succession of curators to manage the expanding plantings and visitors' experience of the reserve.

Olive Pink Botanic Garden was listed on the Register of the National Estate on 30 May 1995, and on the Northern Territory Heritage Register on 18 March 2009, because of its strong links to Miss Olive Pink, anthropologist, campaigner for Aboriginal social justice, artist and visionary gardener.

The garden was inspiration for Anne Boyd's orchestral composition Olive Pink's Garden (2017). Boyd's 2022 opera, Olive Pink, was premiered in the garden.
