= Queensland borders =

Borders of the state of Queensland, Australia

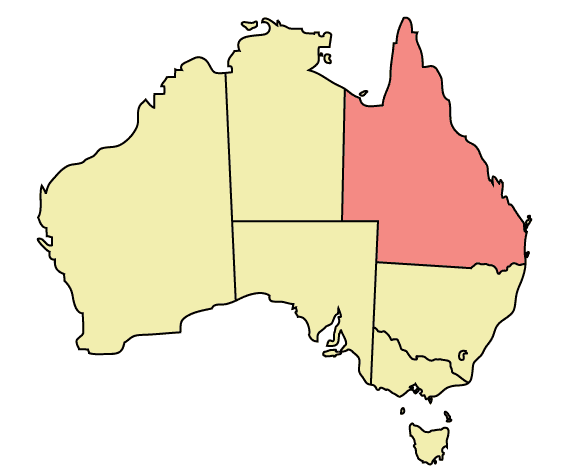
Queensland, the north-east state of Australia

Queensland is the north-eastern state of Australia and has land borders with three other Australian states and territories: New South Wales (to the south), South Australia (to the south-west) and Northern Territory (to the west). To the north of Queensland is the Torres Strait separating the Australian mainland from Papua New Guinea. To the east of Queensland is the Coral Sea, part of the Pacific Ocean. There are many islands off the Queensland coast which form part of the state of Queensland.

The far western boundary with the Northern Territory is aligned along the 138th meridian east until Poeppel Corner at the intersection of this meridian and the 26th parallel south. It is here that Queensland borders South Australia. The boundary follows this latitude until it reaches the 141st meridian east at Haddon Corner where the border turns south reaching Cameron Corner on the 29th parallel south, the most western part of the border with New South Wales. The border follows this latitude towards the coast at about the 154th meridian east before following the courses of a number of rivers, then across a number of mountain ranges until it reaches Point Danger. From west to east, these rivers are the Barwon River, Macintyre River and Dumaresq River.

Southern border towns include Mungindi, Goondiwindi and Texas.

== 1838 Royal Geographical Society proposal ==
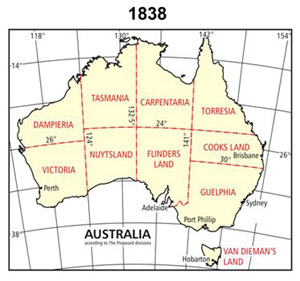
James Vetch proposal, 1838

By 1838 the coastline of the Australian continent had been well defined by mariners such as James Cook, Matthew Flinders and Phillip Parker King. As for the interior of Australia, little was known by the European settlers except for the area south of a line from Moreton Bay to Victoria as it is now (the south-east of the continent). This knowledge had been obtained from the journeys of explorers such as John Oxley, Charles Sturt, Thomas Mitchell, Allan Cunningham and George Evans.

There were many proposals for the subdivision of the Australian continent dating back to the 1830s. This proposal by Captain James Vetch was published by the Royal Geographical Society in their journal of 1838. Vetch tried to give each colony equal areas, possess a tract of sea coast with possible harbour sites and be as compact as possible.

The boundaries of his proposed colonies were defined using lines of latitude and longitude. This was generally used by colonial administrators when there was either no natural features such as rivers and ranges or due to exploration of the country not being well enough advanced to know if there were any natural features.

== 1846 colony of North Australia ==
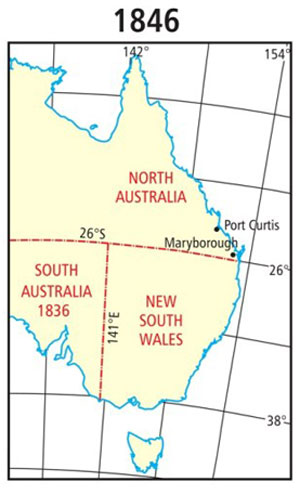
The southern boundary of the short-lived Colony of North Australia, 1846–1847, was further north than the later boundary of Queensland.

The loss of the American Colonies due to the American War of Independence (1775–1783) forced the British Government to find another place to send its convicted felons. Its most recent acquisition (1770) New Holland (now Australia) was chosen and the first penal settlement established at Port Jackson in 1788 by Captain Arthur Phillip. Other settlements soon followed, Norfolk Island, Van Diemen's Land (now Tasmania), Port Macquarie and in 1824 Moreton Bay.

In 1840 the transportation of convicts to New South Wales ceased although Van Diemen's Land continued to receive large numbers of convicts. When William Ewart Gladstone became Secretary of State for the Colonies in 1845, he was confronted with the problem of the large numbers of pardoned convicts roaming around Van Diemen's Land unable to find work. Rather than revive transportation to New South Wales, which he knew would be very unpopular, he decided to create a new colony in the northern part of New South Wales. To this new colony he proposed to send the pardoned convicts of Van Diemen's Land, and he hoped that in time they could form the backbone of a new vibrant free colony.

In May 1846, Lieutenant Colonel George Barney of the Royal Engineers was chosen as the new colony administrative head. He was soon despatched to Sydney and instructed to find a suitable site to the north of Moreton Bay, but not that far north that the tropical climate would have an adverse effect on the health of the settlers, preventing them from hard work and industry. Port Curtis (now Gladstone in Queensland) was chosen. Also in the same month, the official Letters Patent were issued by Queen Victoria forming a new colony to be called North Australia. The southern boundary of this new colony was to be 26 degrees of south latitude (just south of present day Maryborough, Queensland).

On 8 January 1847, the Lord Auckland sailed from Sydney with the new colonial officials and their families arriving at Port Curtis on 25 January 1847. On entering the port the Lord Auckland grounded on a shoal. The officials quickly headed for shore and a few days later, the official swearing in of Lieutenant Governor Barney and his officials took place.

In July 1846, back in Britain, the Government had changed, and Henry Grey, 3rd Earl Grey had replaced Gladstone as Secretary of State for the Colonies. The new government had decided to abandon the new colony and advised the Queen to revoke the Letters Patent. This decision took many months to reach the Governor of New South Wales, Sir Charles Augustus FitzRoy, and then to be transmitted to Barney ordering the abandonment of the North Australia colony and the return to Sydney.

The officials in Port Curtis had endured 4 months of indecision, rain, heat, and mosquitoes before they returned to the civilisation of Sydney where they arrived in May 1847. No pardoned convict ever reached the new colony.

== 1851 John Dunmore Lang colony ==
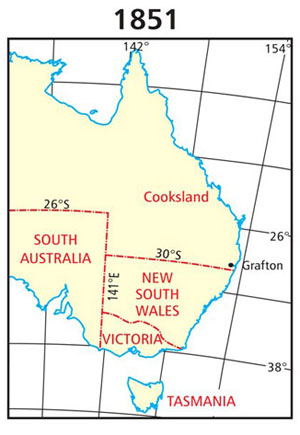
1851 map of the proposed Cooksland state border along a line at 30 degrees south latitude

In 1823, John Dunmore Lang (1799–1878) a Presbyterian clergyman, politician, immigration organiser, educationist, journalist, patriot and statesman arrived in Sydney to take up his ministry.

Lang soon realised that the poverty he left behind in Britain could be relieved to some extent by emigration to Australia, feeling that a well-off Protestant peasantry would reduce the problems of English industrialism. To this end he was always looking for suitable new areas and country away from the problems of Sydney and Hobart.

In 1845, Lang visited Moreton Bay and was so impressed that in 1848 he persuaded and personally selected approximately 600 immigrants to come to Moreton Bay, who arrived in Moreton Bay in 1849 on the ships Fortitude, Chaseley, and Lima. Lang's promise of free land in proportion to their passage money was not realised due to colonial bureaucracy and his scheme failed.

In the years 1847–49, while visiting England, Lang wrote a series of letters to Earl Grey (Secretary of State for the Colonies) recommending that a new colony be created out of New South Wales to the northward of 30 degrees of south latitude. The British Government must have been influenced by Lang’s proposals as in 1851 they passed an imperial act, the Australian Constitutions Act 1850 (13 & 14 Vict. c. 59 (Imp)), which contained a clause (section 34) which provided for the establishment of new colonies in the future.

In 1856, the Secretary of State for the Colonies announced that it was their intention to create a new colony whose southern border line would run not far to the south of 30 degrees south latitude (just south of present day Grafton, New South Wales) but would be accommodated to suit the natural features of the country.

During the next few years strong debate ensued, petitions for and against (from both the squatters and merchants in the proposed border area) were sent to the Governor of New South Wales, Sir William Denison, and the Secretary of State for the Colonies in Britain. Lang kept agitating for his colony, which he proposed to call "Cooksland", after Captain James Cook, where he hoped to settle Protestants as small farmers who would grow crops of cotton and sugar.

The considerable influence of the New England and Armidale squatters was to greatly affect the location of the border. They feared that if they were to be located in the new colony, their power base, which was in the Sydney Parliament, would be eroded. As a result, in 1857 Denison proposed a border starting further north along the coastline at Point Danger (about 28 degrees south latitude). He wrote to Henry Lebouchere, the Secretary of State for the Colonies and recommended that the boundaries of the new north-eastern colony be:

"Starting from Cape Danger and following the range of hills which now separate the district of Clarence River from that of Moreton Bay, it should continue along the ridge forming the boundary of the basins of the Richmond and the Clarence until it reaches the Parallel of 29º of south latitude, along which it should continue westward till it reaches the meridian of 141º East…"

== Boundaries proclaimed at separation ==
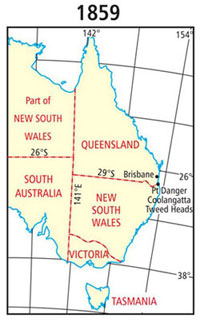
Queensland boundaries as proclaimed at separation in 1859

On 6 June 1859, Queen Victoria signed the Letters Patent that proclaimed a separate colony from New South Wales was created and to be called Queensland. It also established the first borders of the state based on Denison's proposal as follows:

"...Now know you, that We have, in pursuance of the powers vested in Us by the said Bill and Act, and of all other powers and authorities in Us in that behalf vested separated from our Colony of New South Wales, and erected in to a separate Colony, so much of the said colony of New South Wales as lies northward of a line commencing on the sea coast at Point Danger, in latitude about 28º 8’ south, and following the range thence which divides the waters of the Tweed, Richmond, and Clarence Rivers from those of the Logan and Brisbane Rivers, westerly, to the great dividing range between the waters falling to the east coast and those of the River Murray; following the great dividing range southerly to the range dividing the waters of Tenterfield Creek from those of the main head of the Dumaresq River; following that range westerly to the Dumaresq River; and following that river (which is locally known as the Severn) downward to its confluence with the Macintyre River; thence following the Macintyre River, which lower down becomes the Barwan, downward to the 29th parallel of south latitude, and following that parallel westerly to the 141st meridian of east longitude, which is the eastern boundary of South Australia, together with all and every the adjacent Islands, their members and appurtenances, in the Pacific Ocean: And do by these presents separate from our said colony of New South Wales and erect the said territory so described into a separate colony to be called the colony of Queensland..."

== 1862 change to Queensland's western border ==
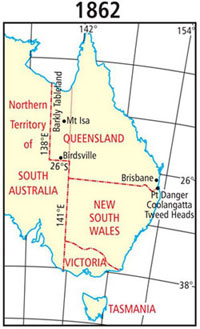
1862 change to Queensland's western border

The western boundary of the colony of Queensland was not clearly described in the Letters Patent of 1859:

"...downward to the 29th parallel of south latitude and following that parallel westerly to the 141st meridian of east longitude which is the easterly boundary of South Australia..."

Legal opinion given at the time stated that the 141st meridian was the western boundary of the colony. In a memorandum to the Governor of Queensland dated 28 September 1860, the Surveyor General of Queensland, Augustus Charles Gregory, described his views on the division of Northern Australia. That was with reference to the adjustment of the political boundaries. On Queensland's western boundary, he said:

"The western boundary of Queensland, as at present defined, appears to be the 141st meridian, but it is probable that it was not described in the Letters Patent erecting the Colony, with greater distinctness, expressly with a view to a future adjustment, when more certain information should have been collected as to the natural features of the country."

He went on to say:

"It is now submitted that the 141st meridian passes through the tract of country known as the 'Plains of Promise', and that the eastern shore possesses no harbours. It would therefore be desirable to adopt the 138th meridian as the boundary; as that line would pass through a barren tract of country, and bring Investigator Road [harbour] within the limits of Queensland."

Investigator Road is an anchorage off Sweers Island in the Gulf of Carpentaria at 17.1155°S 139.5855°E named by Matthew Flinders on 21 November 1802. The Plains of Promise was the area now in the vicinity of Burketown at 17.975°S 129.416°E, which was named by John Lort Stokes, Commander of HMS Beagle in August 1841.

In 1861, the South Australian, Victorian and Queensland governments funded expeditions to rescue the Burke and Wills expedition. They had failed to return from their journey to the Gulf of Carpentaria in 1860. The Queensland Government realised that the expeditions would increase the knowledge of the country in the vicinity of the Gulf.

On 5 September 1861, Queensland Governor George Bowen informed the Secretary of State for the Colonies that Queensland Parliament would protect any settlers who moved into the area. That was on the provision that the western boundary of Queensland was extended to include the Gulf of Carpentaria.

This proposal was accepted by the British Government, provided that the Queensland Government understood that the additional territory west of the 138th meridian could be taken back at a later date. That was with a view for the formation of another separate colony in that area.

On 12 April 1862, a supplementary commission altering the boundary of Queensland was issued by the British Government. These Letters Patent described the additional territory annexed to the Colony of Queensland as:

"So much of our Colony of New South Wales as there to the northward of the twenty-sixth parallel of south latitude and between the one hundred and forty first and one hundred and thirty-eighth meridians of east longitude, together with all and every, the adjacent islands, their members and appurtenances in the Gulf of Carpentaria."

It was at that stage that the bend in the western boundary of Queensland came into existence.

== Surveying the Queensland-New South Wales border ==
The state corners

In 1863, surveyors Francis Edward Roberts from Queensland and Isaiah Rowland from New South Wales were chosen to survey the boundary line between Queensland and New South Wales. The survey of the Queensland-New South Wales border was to be made up of 3 components:

- Point Danger to the Dumaresq River
- Dumaresq to the Macintyre and Barwon rivers
- 29th parallel of south latitude.

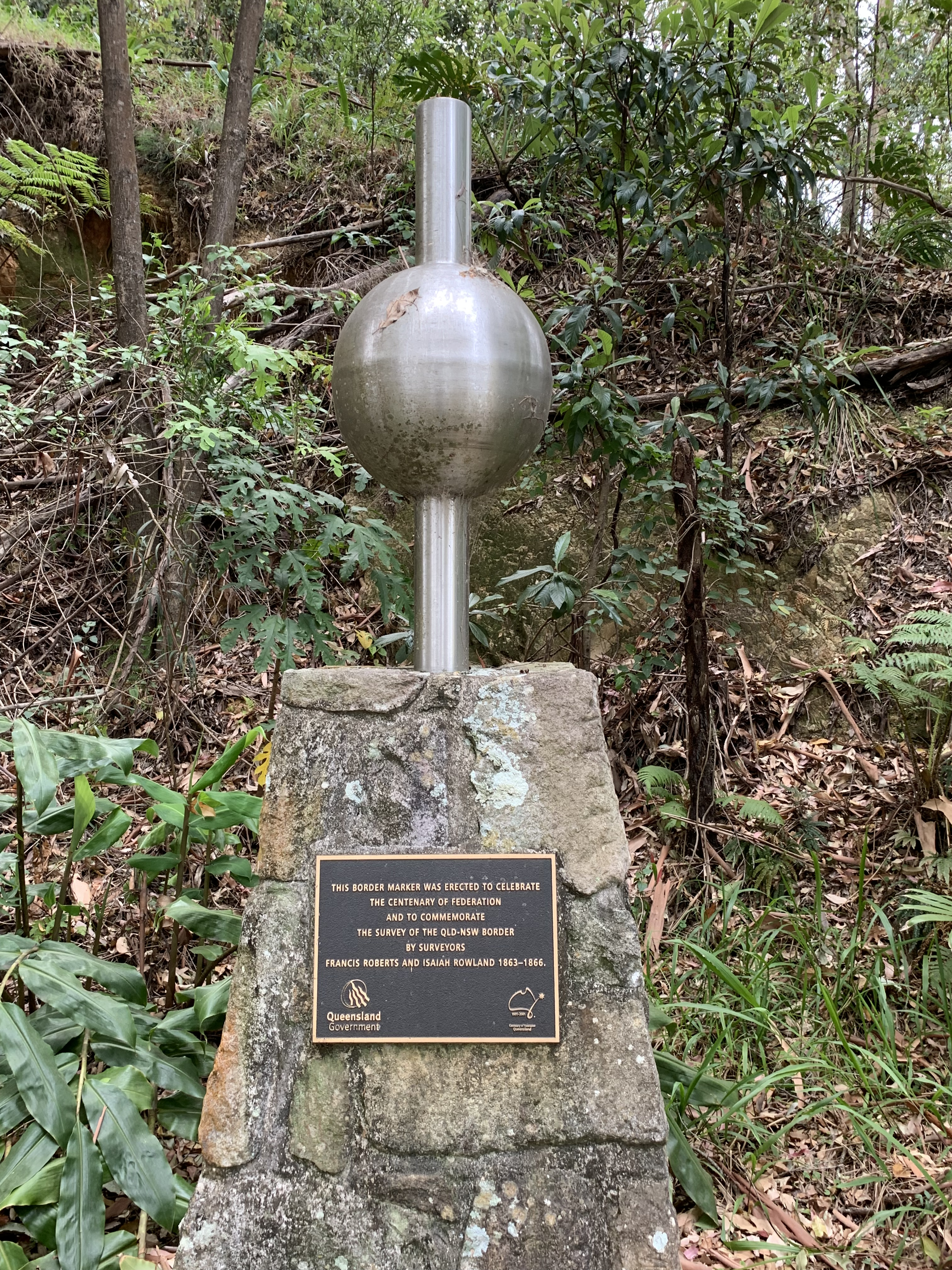
Monument to Roberts and Rowland, 2018

Only the parallel of latitude and the border ranges had to be surveyed. The river section did not require survey, as it was a natural feature and was readily identifiable.

Starting from Point Danger in June 1863, the surveyors marked a rock with their initials. The mark included a colony abbreviation and the last two digits of the year. However, the rock mark was lost at the turn of the century, probably from quarrying.

Two separate surveys were carried out, but in many instances both surveyors used the same tree to mark the corners. As a result of the two different surveys, Rowland and Roberts defined the border in different positions. At the direction of the Queensland Surveyor-General, Roberts deviated from the definable position of the watershed in order to increase accuracy of the survey.

The New South Wales and Queensland governments have since essentially adopted the survey of Roberts in preference to that by Rowland.

In 2001 as part of the celebration of the centenary of the Federation of Australia, a monument to Roberts and Rowland was placed on the border of Queensland and New South Wales at 28.2408°S 153.3771°E.

=== Gregory's and Greaves' survey ===
The initial survey of latitude 29ºS was fixed in 1865 by the Queensland Surveyor General, Sir Augustus Charles Gregory and District Surveyor from Armidale, New South Wales, William Albert Baylesford Greaves.

The purpose of the survey was to give landholders in the vicinity of the border an indication of the extent of their leases and rent payable in each colony.

WD Campbell reported in The Surveyor in 1895:

"In 1865, an arrangement was made between New South Wales and Queensland for the fixing of the position of the intercolonial boundary line, the 29th parallel of latitude, at the intersections of the Rivers Barwon, Mooni, Bokhara, Narran, Biri and Culgoa, to enable the Governments of the respective colonies to adjust the rents of leases of the several pastoral runs affected, some of which were partly in both colonies... The marking of the border was done with steel [iron] pins one inch in diameter and two feet long, driven a few inches below the surface ... This process was repeated at each of the above named rivers, and the work was completed in five or six weeks."

=== Official determination survey ===
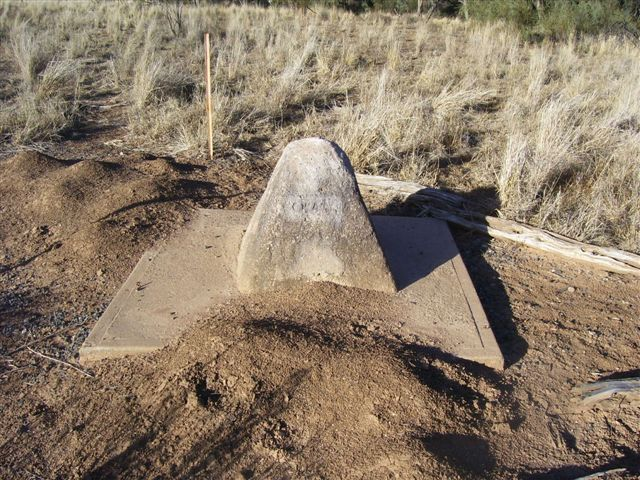
Zero Obelisk

The official survey of the 29ºS parallel was conducted by John Brewer Cameron (NSW) and George Chale Watson (Qld) between 1879 and 1881.

Astronomical observations were taken at the Barringun telegraph station to determine the latitude and longitude. Following those observations, the Zero Obelisk was erected on the banks of the Warrego River, just north of the town.

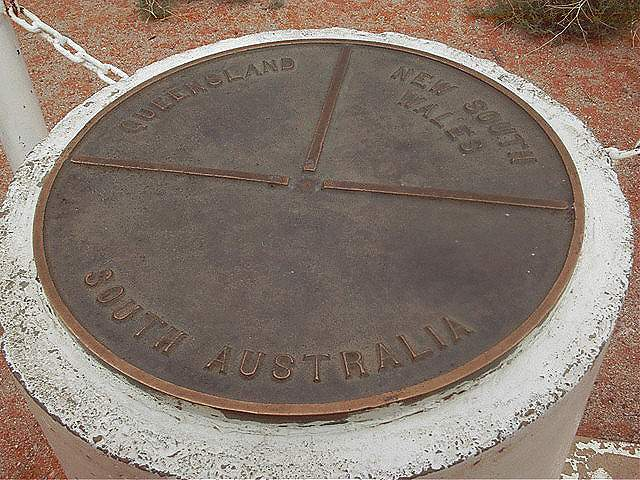
Cameron's Corner survey mark

From that mark, the first 5 mile chord was produced westerly and the mile posts offset from that chord to the arc (chord and arc are used when surveying latitude to allow for curvature of the Earth). That continued until the survey intersected longitude 141º (now known as Cameron Corner), a distance of 285 miles 24.96 chains. That spot is marked by the Cameron Corner Survey Marker.

Watson withdrew from the survey and Cameron then returned to the Zero Obelisk at Barringun and marked the line to the east in a similar fashion. Cameron then erected a 1 ton survey post on the west bank of the Barwon River to mark the end of the survey.

== Surveying the Queensland-South Australia border ==
The survey of the Queensland-South Australian border was first carried out by the South Australian surveyor William Barron, as Queensland did not have a surveyor available at the time. Barron carried the marking of the 141st meridian up to its intersection with the 29th parallel of south latitude (Cameron Corner), and then on to Cooper Creek (90 miles north of that intersection). Barron was forced to return to Adelaide in late 1879 by ill health.

The South Australian surveyors Augustus Poeppel and his assistant Lawrence Wells, took over the survey in January 1880. The line to the 26th parallel was continued, a distance of 552¼ miles from the Murray River.

There, Poeppel met up with Queensland surveyor, Alexander Hutchinson Salmond. Together, they took star observations for latitude using both a transit theodolite and sextant to fix the position of that parallel. They marked the corner with a willow post 12 feet long, which was sunk over an iron bar.

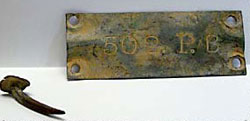
A zinc plate from a milepost

The line was marked by mile posts mounded and trenched. A zinc plate was attached to the posts declaring the distance from the centre of the Murray River.

Poeppel then continued to mark the 26th parallel to the west. He reached the 138th meridian by the end of 1880 and returned to Adelaide in March 1881 because of the prevailing drought conditions. Many hardships were encountered on the survey, as the line passed through vast stony waterless plains, salt lakes and large sand hills. It was thought to be the most inhospitable country in Australia.

While Poeppel was recuperating in Adelaide, the South Australian triangulation survey had reached beyond the border. It was found that when checking the mile posts, they were in error since Poeppel's chain was 1 inch too long as a result of wear.

== Surveying the Queensland-Northern Territory border ==
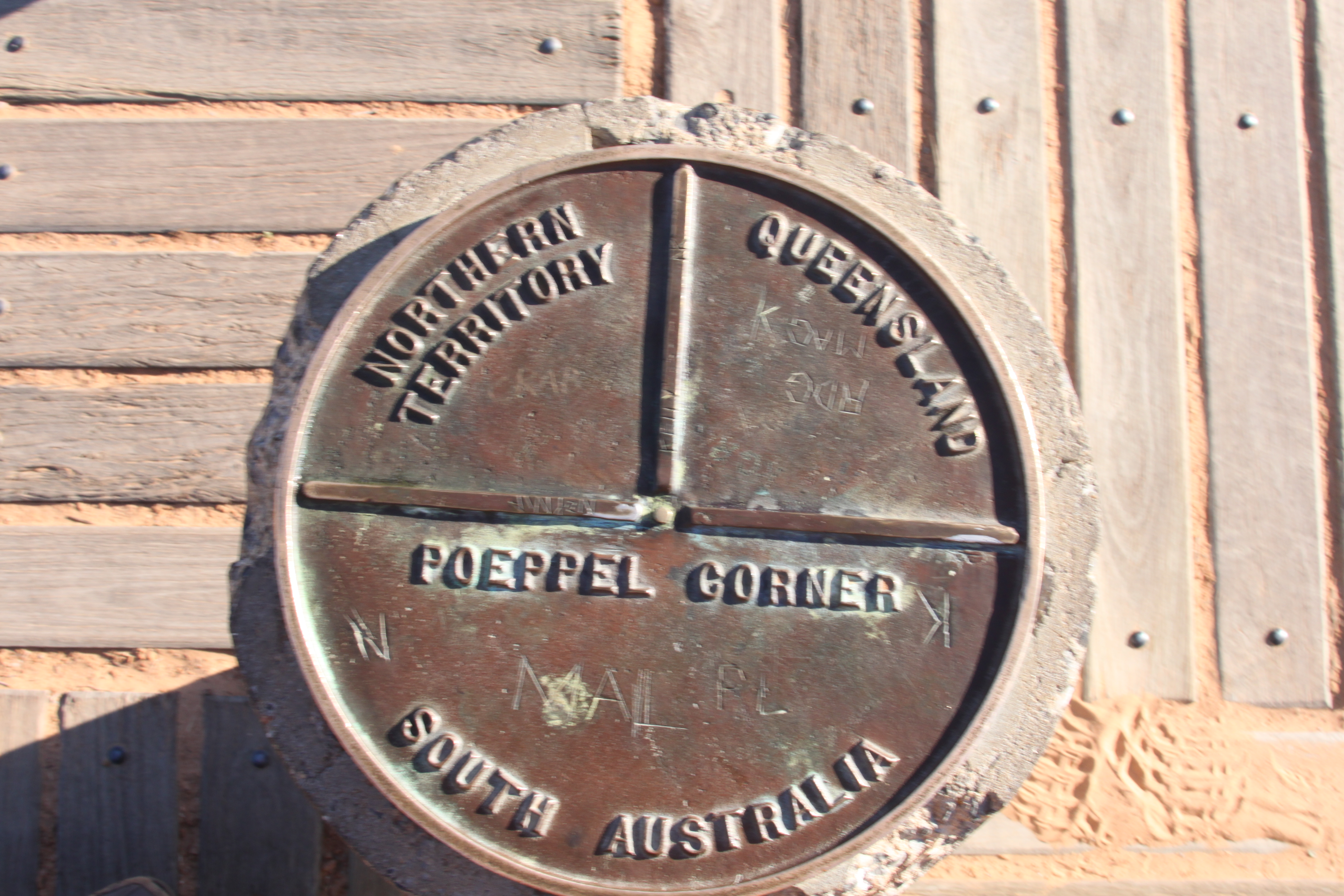
Poeppel Corner Marker

The work of running the line true north along the 138th meridian from the intersection of the 26th parallel (Poeppel Corner) to the Gulf of Carpentaria was carried out in early 1884 by Augustus Poeppel. He was assisted by Lawrence Wells, along with 6 assistants and 2 cameleers.

At the 250 mile post, the survey ceased for the 1884 Christmas break, allowing the survey party to have a well-earned rest. Until then, drought conditions had prevailed.

In January 1885, the rains came and local stations recorded as much as 43 centimetres (17 in) in a few days. After the rains, conditions had improved and the survey recommenced with rapid progress until they reached the ranges north of the Nicholson River. There, the team experienced all sorts of difficulties including rocky terrain, a fire that destroyed their camp and raids by Aboriginals.

At the 324 mile post, Poeppel had to return to Adelaide because of severe eye problems.

John Carruthers took his place as leader of the survey, and Lawrence Wells continued as second in command. The country improved as the survey continued northwards and the pastoral stations became more frequent and closer to the boundary. Once they had reached the shores of the Gulf of Carpentaria in September 1886, they erected a large terminal survey post, 50 links above high water mark.

It was later discovered that problems with Poeppel's theodolite caused him and his team to have run the line at about 359°58'30", instead of true north 360°. That resulted in a discrepancy of about 600 metres into the Northern Territory at the shores of the Gulf of Carpentaria.

=== Checking longitude 138 degrees ===
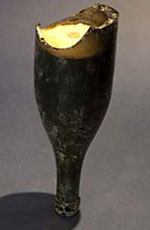
The remains of one of surveyor Cecil Twisden Bedford's bottles

Queensland did not provide a team for the survey but checked the position of the mile post on the border line west of Boulia. Staff surveyor Cecil Twisden Bedford was chosen by the Queensland Surveyor General, William Alcock Tully, to carry out this check survey.

Arriving in Boulia in August 1885, Bedford established his starting point in the post and telegraph reserve. That was the location that the longitude reading determined by electric telegraph was recorded.

Bedford then traversed westward to the border, connecting on to the border between the 255 mile and 255 mile 77 chain posts in February 1886.

Bedford's traverse was marked with wooden mile posts for the 147 miles to the border. A bottle containing concrete and an empty brass cartridge case was sunk 2½ feet below every fifth wooden post.

Bedford's second in command, William Davidson, in later years wrote:

"As white ants were very bad out there, it is quite possible that very few traces remain of our work above ground, but perhaps the bottles of cement we placed at every five miles along our line may prove interesting to scientists of some future generation, should they ever be unearthed."

In 1988, as a special project for the Australian Bicentenary, the Queensland Division of the Institute of Engineering and Mining Surveyors of Australia retraced Bedford's survey and found his bottles.

=== Fixing the longitude ===
In 1887, Queensland staff surveyors Robert Hoggan and Robert Grant McDowall carried out observations at the post and telegraph station in Boulia. That fixed the longitude of Bedford's initial starting point.

The method used was the exchange of time signals via the electric telegraph. That was between the Brisbane Observatory of known longitude and Bedford's starting point beside the telegraph office in Boulia. By using a traverse, they obtained a longitude value for the mile post out on the border west of Boulia. Bedford's observation revealed that the mile posts placed on the border by the South Australian surveyors were accurate.

== Maritime and island boundaries ==
In 1863, in response to a query from Governor Bowen, the British government advised that "no islands beyond the three mile limit which were uninhabited by British subjects when New South Wales was granted responsible government could be considered part of any Australian colony". This placed a number of offshore islands in international waters outside of Queensland's jurisdiction, to Bowen's dissatisfaction. In 1868, the British government issued letters patent allowing the colony of New South Wales to grant leases for guano mining on islands west of the 154th meridian east. The New South Wales government subsequently began issuing licences for islands adjacent to the Great Barrier Reef, again to the dissatisfaction of Queensland.

Despite the de jure status of offshore islands outside of the colony's jurisdiction, the Queensland government began issuing competing mining licences and undertaking enforcement actions on islands in the Torres Strait and Coral Sea. Lobbying eventually caused the British government to expand Queensland's jurisdiction to islands within 60 miles (97 km) of shore, although the amended letters patent of 30 May 1872 were somewhat ambiguous. The letters patent brought most of the Torres Strait Islands and Torres Strait Islanders under Queensland jurisdiction. In 1879, the remaining islands in the strait were annexed via British letters patent and Queensland legislation, thereby bringing the entirety of the Torres Strait under Queensland control.

After Federation, the Coral Sea Islands Territory was established off Queensland's east coast through the Coral Sea Islands Act 1969. This act specified that the western boundary of this new territory would lie along the eastern edge of the Great Barrier Reef.

== See also ==
- Queensland and New South Wales boundary encroachments
