= Weemelah, New South Wales =

Weemelah
- Town
- Coordinates: 29°01′0″S 149°15′0″E
- Country: Australia
- State: New South Wales
- LGA: Moree Plains Shire
- Location: 27 km (17 mi) E of Mungindi

Government
  - State electorate: Northern Tablelands
  - Federal division: Parkes

Population
  - Total: 139 (2011 census)

Weemelah is a small village in Moree Plains Shire, New South Wales, Australia. It is 3 km north off the Carnarvon Highway and 27 km east of Mungindi. At the 2006 census, Weemelah had a population of 139.

The main industry is agriculture. The Country Women's Association of New South Wales meets in Weemelah Hall. The nearest public transport is at Moree railway station. There are no schools in Weemelah and local children travel to Mungindi for their education.

In January 2004, the residents of Weemelah were isolated due to extensive flooding in the area.

Weemalah is situated on the Mungindi, or North West railway line, 762 km from Sydney. A railway station was opened in December 1914 as Bunarba, and was renamed Weemalah in 1926. Passenger trains operated to Moree between 1926 and 1974. The station has now been demolished and no trace of it remains. However, large grain-loading facilities still exist, and Weemalah is the northernmost point of grain train operation on the line, because the line from there to Mungindi was closed in 1974 due to flood damage.

Preceding station	Former services	Following station
Neeworra towards Mungindi	Mungindi Line	Bengerang towards Werris Creek
