= Mungindi =

- Town
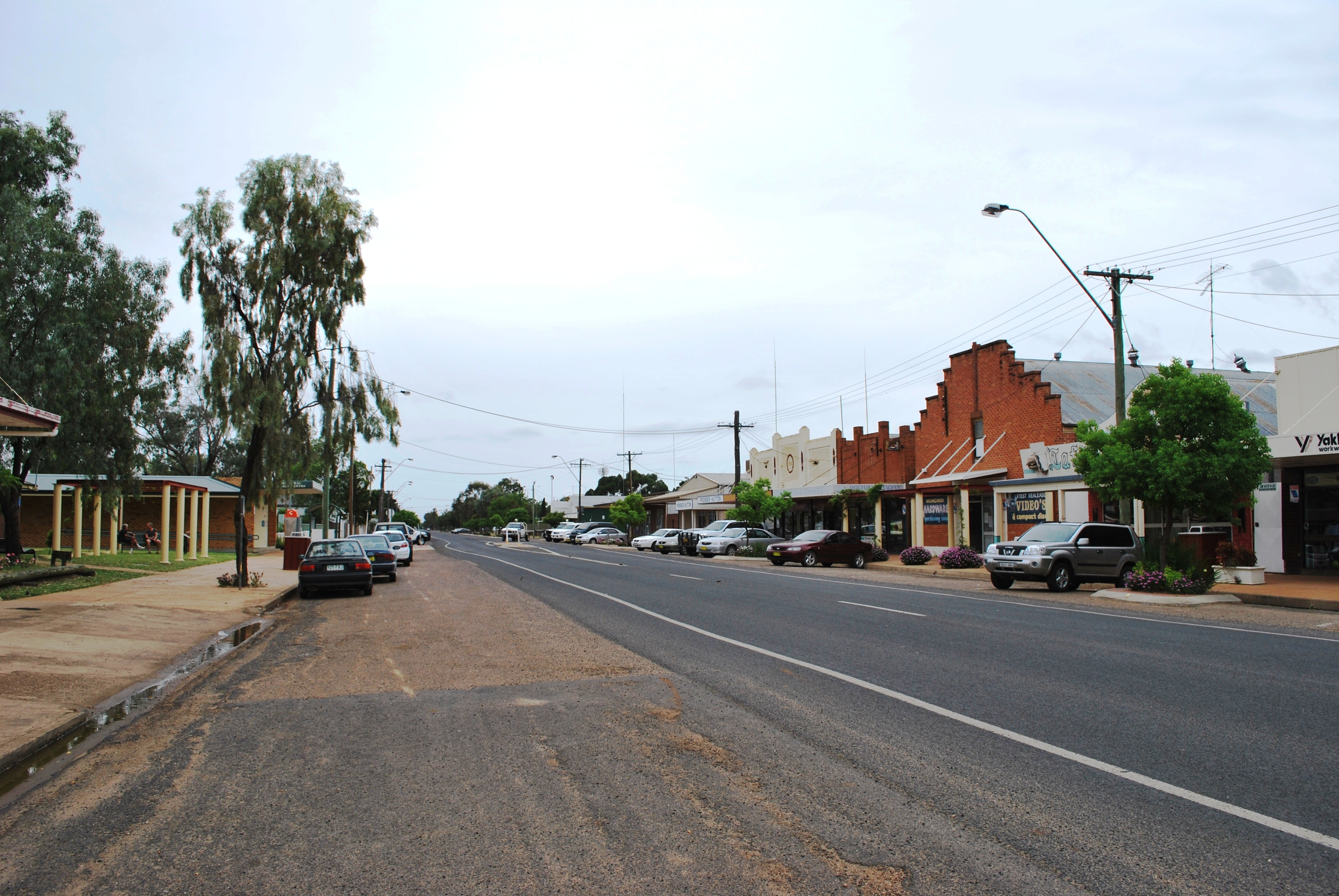
- Main street, 2008

- Coordinates: 28°58′37″S 148°59′22″E
- Country: Australia
- State: New South Wales
- LGAs: Moree Plains Shire (NSW); Balonne Shire (QLD); Goondiwindi Region (QLD)
- Location: 738 km (459 mi) NW of Sydney; 511 km (318 mi) WSW of Brisbane; 133 km (83 mi) S of St George; 122 km (76 mi) NW of Moree

Government
  - State electorates: Northern Tablelands (NSW); Warrego (QLD)
  - Federal divisions: Parkes (NSW); Maranoa (QLD)

Population
  - Total: 611 (2021 census)
- Postcode: 2406
- County: Benarba (NSW); Belmore (QLD)
Localities around Mungindi
Dirranbandi (Qld)	Thallon (Qld); Daymar (Qld)	Talwood (Qld)
Collarenebri (NSW)	Mungindi	Boomi (NSW)*
Collarenebri (NSW)	Bullarah (NSW)	Weemelah (NSW)

Mungindi /ˈmʌŋɪndaɪ/ is a rural town and locality on the border of New South Wales (NSW) and Queensland, Australia. The town is within Moree Plains Shire in New South Wales. Within Queensland, the locality is split between the Shire of Balonne (the western part) and the Goondiwindi Region (eastern part). The town itself is in the Shire of Balonne. It has a New South Wales postcode. Mungindi is on the Carnarvon Highway and straddles the Barwon River, which forms the border between New South Wales and Queensland. In the 2021 census, the locality of Mungindi had a population of 487 people in New South Wales and 124 people in Queensland, a total of 611 people.

== Geography ==
Mungindi means water hole in the river in Kamilaroi. Located on both sides of the New South Wales and Queensland border, Mungindi is one of very few border towns in the Southern Hemisphere with the same name on both sides of the border. The state border runs down the centre of the Barwon River and under the centre of the Mungindi Bridge.

Nearby towns are Moree in New South Wales and St George in Queensland. Nearby villages are, in New South Wales, Weemelah, Garah, Ashley and Boomi, and in Queensland, the towns of Thallon, Dirranbandi and Hebel. Mungindi Aerodrome is on the New South Wales side.

=== Climate ===
Climate data for Mungindi Post Office (1991–2020 normal, extremes 1965–present)
Month	Jan	Feb	Mar	Apr	May	Jun	Jul	Aug	Sep	Oct	Nov	Dec	Year
Record high °C (°F)	48.2 (118.8)	47.8 (118.0)	42.9 (109.2)	38.0 (100.4)	33.0 (91.4)	28.9 (84.0)	29.9 (85.8)	37.8 (100.0)	39.9 (103.8)	42.1 (107.8)	45.8 (114.4)	47.0 (116.6)	48.2 (118.8)
Mean daily maximum °C (°F)	36.2 (97.2)	34.4 (93.9)	32.4 (90.3)	28.8 (83.8)	24.1 (75.4)	20.3 (68.5)	19.9 (67.8)	22.2 (72.0)	26.3 (79.3)	30.0 (86.0)	32.8 (91.0)	34.8 (94.6)	28.5 (83.3)
Daily mean °C (°F)	29.0 (84.2)	27.6 (81.7)	25.2 (77.4)	21.0 (69.8)	16.5 (61.7)	13.3 (55.9)	12.5 (54.5)	14.1 (57.4)	18.1 (64.6)	22.0 (71.6)	25.2 (77.4)	27.4 (81.3)	21.0 (69.8)
Mean daily minimum °C (°F)	21.9 (71.4)	20.8 (69.4)	18.0 (64.4)	13.2 (55.8)	8.9 (48.0)	6.3 (43.3)	5.2 (41.4)	6.0 (42.8)	9.9 (49.8)	13.9 (57.0)	17.5 (63.5)	20.0 (68.0)	13.5 (56.3)
Record low °C (°F)	9.0 (48.2)	8.0 (46.4)	5.5 (41.9)	0.4 (32.7)	−1.1 (30.0)	−3.3 (26.1)	−4.4 (24.1)	−2.6 (27.3)	−0.6 (30.9)	2.0 (35.6)	6.1 (43.0)	7.0 (44.6)	−4.4 (24.1)
Average precipitation mm (inches)	69.2 (2.72)	63.0 (2.48)	44.6 (1.76)	17.1 (0.67)	29.6 (1.17)	31.1 (1.22)	28.1 (1.11)	20.6 (0.81)	25.8 (1.02)	38.1 (1.50)	61.5 (2.42)	58.9 (2.32)	487.8 (19.20)
Average precipitation days (≥ 1 mm)	5.1	4.8	4.0	1.9	3.0	3.5	3.5	2.6	2.9	4.6	5.2	5.3	46.4
Source 1: National Oceanic and Atmospheric Administration
Source 2: Bureau of Meteorology

== History ==
The Mungindi area was originally inhabited by the Kamilaroi (Gamilaraay) Aboriginal people. Their traditional land extends from the Barwon River to south of the Namoi River near Gunnedah. Gamilaraay (Gamilaroi, Kamilaroi, Comilroy) is a language spoken in south-west Queensland and north-west New South Wales. The Gamilaraay language region includes the land within the local government boundaries of the Balonne Shire Council, including the towns of Dirranbandi, Thallon, Talwood and Bungunya as well as the border towns of Mungindi and Boomi extending to Moree, Tamworth and Coonabarabran in NSW.

Yuwaalaraay (also known as Yuwalyai, Euahlayi, Yuwaaliyaay, Gamilaraay, Kamilaroi, Yuwaaliyaayi) is an Australian Aboriginal language spoken on Yuwaalaraay country. The Yuwaalaraay language region includes the area within the local government boundaries of the Shire of Balonne, including the town of Dirranbandi as well as the border town of Hebel extending to Walgett and Collarenebri in New South Wales.

Major Thomas Mitchell passed through Mungindi in the 1830s, during his exploration of the interior in search of areas suitable for agricultural development.

By the 1850s, with stock moving on both sides of the Barwon River, the ford at Mungindi just upstream from the present bridge became the principal crossing. Reliable waterholes and shaded flats on the riverbanks provided early drovers with a pleasant camp in the area, which the Gamilaroi Aboriginal People had held since antiquity as an important meeting place. Regular use of the track is indicated by the fact that two, 40-chain (800 m) stock routes were proclaimed by 1868, both to Mungindi, one from St George and one from Whyenbah via Dareel.

Queensland became a separate colony in 1859 and by 1862 the Queensland Government was operating a packhorse mail service between Surat and Yarawa.

By 1894, when the NSW school was twelve months old and had become a full public school with an average minimum attendance of 30, the Queensland Government opened Mungindi Provisional School opened with an enrolment of 22 students. On 1 January 1909, the Queensland school became Mungindi State School. The Queensland school closed in 1968. The Queensland school was at 92–100 Barwon Street (28.9722°S 148.9874°E).

Mungindi marks the northernmost point of the Mungindi (or North West) railway line and lies 798 kilometres (496 mi) from Sydney. The line opened on 7 December 1914 and was closed between Weemelah and Mungindi on 5 January 1974 when services were withdrawn following flooding. The former railway station is now used as a private residence.

On 28 January 1919, the Queensland Government placed restrictions on the border crossing at Mungindi to prevent the spread of the Spanish flu into Queensland, which were enforced by the Queensland Police. A medical screening process was used to determine if Queensland residents could safely return to the state.

St Brigid's Catholic School opened on n 24 January 1924, operated by four Sisters of Mercy who came from the Gunnedah. A new school was built in 1930 and the name was changed to St. Joseph's. The Sisters of Mercy withdrew from the school in 1975, but operated the boarding school until 1980. The Little Company of Mary then operated the boarding school from 1981 to 1983. In 1984, the Sisters of St Joseph's took over the operations of the school.

During 2020 and 2021, the Queensland borders were closed to most people due to the COVID-19 pandemic. Border crossing points were either closed or had a Queensland Police checkpoint to allow entry to only those people with an appropriate permit. The Carnarvon Highway at Mungindi had a police checkpoint.

On 1 September 2020, a fire destroyed many shops on St George Street, including the grocery store and butcher.

== Demographics ==
In the 2016 census, the locality of Mungindi had a population of 601 people in New South Wales and 146 people in Queensland, a total of 747 people.

In the 2021 census, the locality of Mungindi had a population of 487 people in New South Wales and 124 people in Queensland, a total of 611 people.

== Heritage listings ==
Mungindi has the following heritage-listed sites:

- Cameron's 1 Ton Survey Post, at the Barwon River, Queensland

== Education ==
Mungindi Central School is a primary and secondary school for boys and girls providing Preschool to Year 12 education at 59–67 Wirrah Street in New South Wales (28.9799°S 148.9908°E). Enrolment is open to children living in the local area including children living in Queensland.

St Joseph's Primary School is a Catholic primary school for boys and girls at 72–74 Bucknell Street (28.9795°S 148.9879°E).

== Amenities ==
Mungindi has two times zones during daylight-saving-time. The town has a preschool in Queensland and the other educational facilities are in NSW. The hospital is on the northern side of the river and the two hotels are on each side of the river.

The district is a hub for regional cotton, beef cattle, and wheat industries.

Mungindi is also the home of the Mungundi Cotton Tails, a men's football team.

== Attractions ==
The One Ton Post was erected by surveyor John Brewer Cameron in 1881 to celebrate the completion of two long and hard years of surveys. The Post is situated 5 kilometres (3 mi) west of the town where the border fence leaves the river and goes 700 kilometres (430 mi) due west on the 29th parallel south to the South Australian border.

== In popular culture ==
The author Scott Monk featured Mungindi in his novel Raw, which features a character called Brett who was sent to an institution farm.

== Transport ==
Preceding station	Former services	Following station
Terminus	Mungindi Line	Neeworra towards Werris Creek
