= Bengerang, New South Wales =

Town in New South Wales, Australia

Coordinates: 29°02′55″S 149°27′04″E

Bengerang is a locality on the Mungindi railway line in north-western New South Wales, Australia. It was the site of a railway station between 1913 and 1975. The railway remains open to goods traffic, mainly wheat from surrounding silos.

Preceding station	Former services	Following station
Weemelah towards Mungindi	Mungindi Line	Garah towards Werris Creek
