= Moppin, New South Wales =

Coordinates: 29°12′S 149°45′E

Moppin is a locality on the Mungindi railway line in north-western New South Wales, Australia. It was the site of a railway station between 1913 and 1975.

Preceding station	Former services	Following station
Garah towards Mungindi	Mungindi Line	Ashley towards Werris Creek
