= Ashley, New South Wales =

Ashley
- Town
- Country: Australia
- State: New South Wales
- LGA: Moree Plains Shire
- Elevation: 195 m (640 ft)

Population
  - Total: 351 (2021 census)
- Postcode: 2400

Ashley (29°18′S 149°49′E) is a small rural locality of 351 people on the Carnarvon Highway, 17 km north of Moree, New South Wales, Australia and 692 km from Sydney. The village boundaries are within the Moree Plains Shire local government area. The village is at a height of 201.4 metres and is in Bogree parish, Courallie County.

Ashley was named after the English home of Mr Hassall, MP for Moree in the State Parliament. The public school opened as Medgun Creek in February 1898 and the name was changed to Ashley in October 1908 before finally closing in August 1968. A post office opened on 20 April 1899 and closed in 1978. The railway opened on 29 September 1913 and closed on 17 December 1974.

There is a general cemetery, hall, a park and a small Rural Fire Service. It is a major cotton producing centre with two large modern cotton gins operating in the district. The cotton is grown on the irrigated black plains that surround the area. Other agriculture produce such as sheep, wool, wheat and beef cattle are also found in the Ashley area.

The Midkin Nature Reserve, on Gingham Road, has been placed on the Register of the National Estate.

Preceding station	Former services	Following station
Moppin towards Mungindi	Mungindi Line	Camurra towards Werris Creek
