= Garah, New South Wales =

Garah
- Town
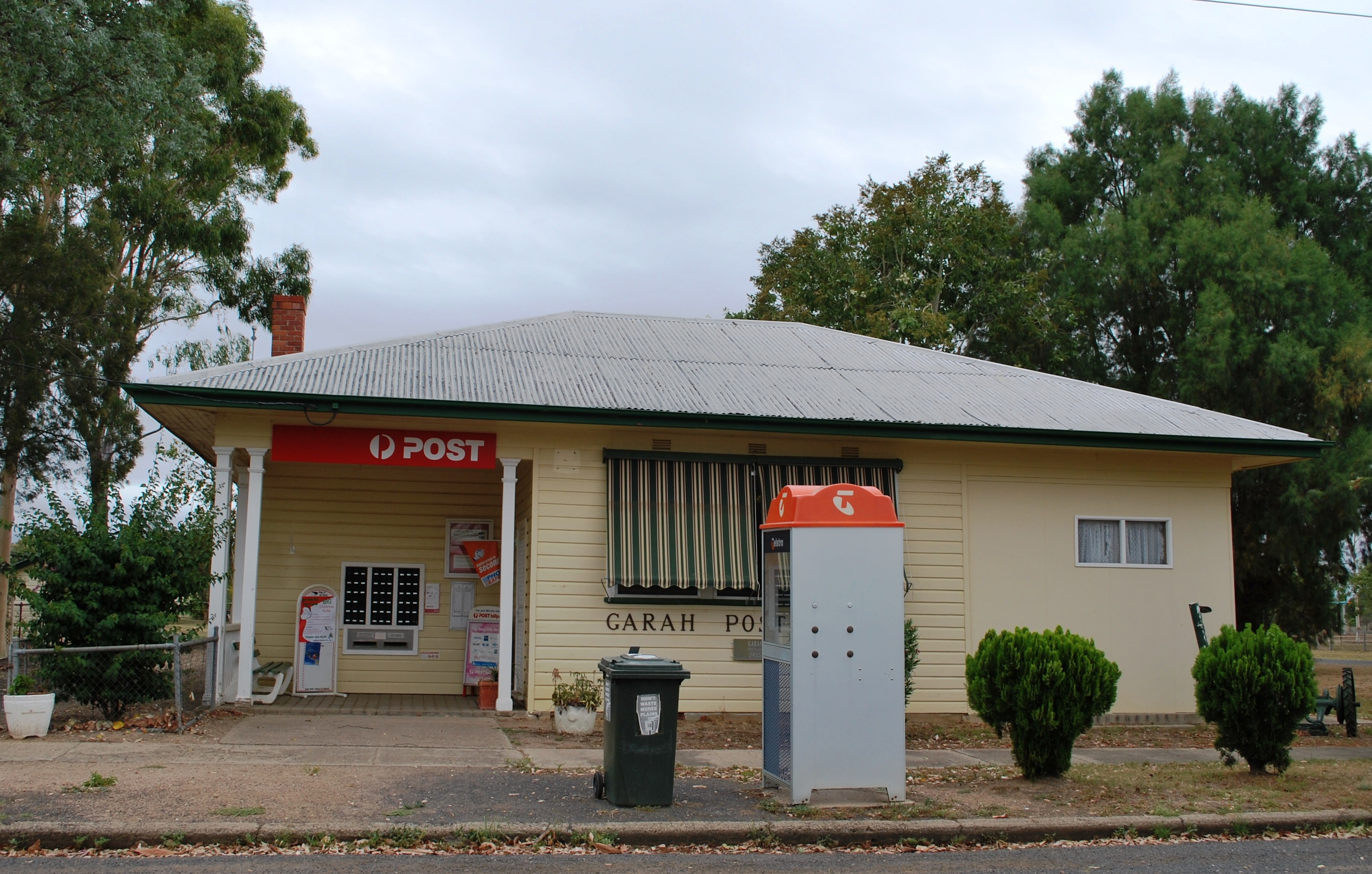
- Post office at Garah

- Coordinates: 29°03′0″S 149°37′0″E
- Country: Australia
- State: New South Wales
- LGA: Moree Plains Shire
- Location: 667 km (414 mi) NW of Sydney; 484 km (301 mi) SW of Brisbane; 51 km (32 mi) NW of Moree

Government
  - State electorate: Northern Tablelands
  - Federal division: Parkes

Population
  - Total: 306 (2016 census)
- Postcode: 2405

Garah is a town in north western New South Wales, Australia. The town is in the Moree Plains Shire local government area. At the 2016 census, Garah and the surrounding area had a population of 306.

== Geography ==
Garah is on the Carnarvon Highway, 667 kilometres (414 mi) north west of the state capital, Sydney and 51 kilometres (32 mi) north west of the regional centre of Moree. It is on the Mungindi railway line (also known as the North West railway line) between Mungindi and Moree.

== History ==
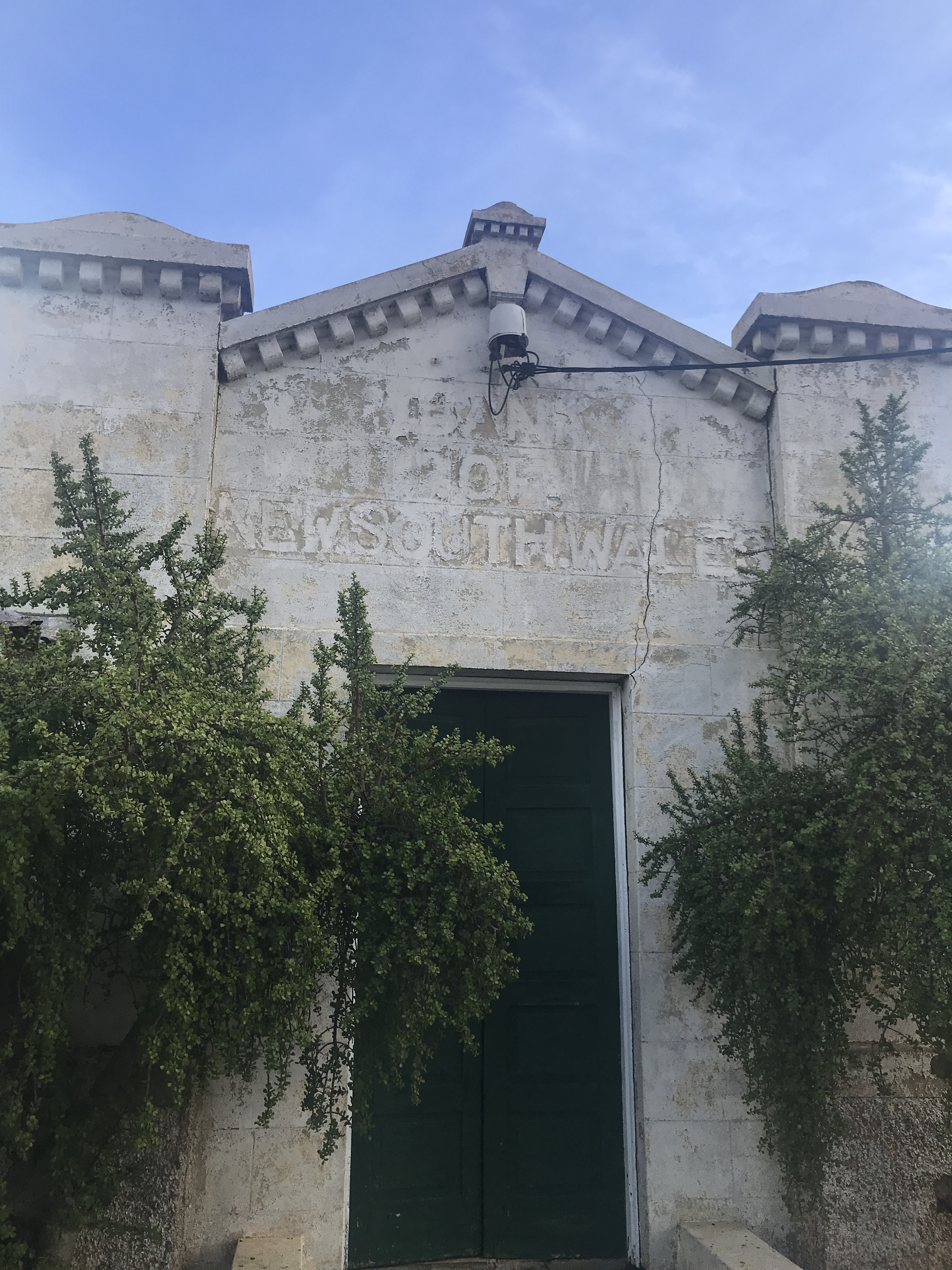
Signage on the former Bank of New South Wales, 2019

The name of the town is an Aboriginal word meaning long or a long distance.

The Garah railway station was open between 1913 and 1974.

A branch of the Bank of New South Wales was opened in Garah in January 1919.

The Presbyterian church in Garah was officially opened on Sunday 21 April 1929 by the Right Reverend A. P. Camerson, church Moderator.

== Facilities ==
Facilities in the town include a post office, primary school, police station, tennis courts, grain silo, CWA hall, town hall, pre-school, corner shop, pub, race course, small petrol bowser, Catholic church and a Presbyterian Church. Local activities include agriculture.

== Events ==
Garah is also said to have the oldest running picnic races in Australia.

Preceding station	Former services	Following station
Bengerang towards Mungindi	Mungindi Line	Moppin towards Werris Creek
