= Neeworra, New South Wales =

Coordinates: 29°02′S 149°05′E

Neeworra is a locality on the Mungindi railway line in north-western New South Wales, Australia. It was the site of a railway station between 1914 and 1975. The railway line has now closed through this location.

Preceding station	Former services	Following station
Mungindi Terminus	Mungindi Line	Weemelah towards Werris Creek
