= Queensland and New South Wales boundary encroachments =

Coordinates: 28°59′56.69″S 140°59′57.13″E

Several Queensland and New South Wales boundary encroachments are anomalies along the boundary between the Australian states of New South Wales (NSW) and Queensland. Due to various historical anomalies, several stations and properties that are officially part of Queensland are south of the 29 degrees south parallel, marking the official border. Three of these can be seen easily on Google Maps near Cameron Corner, where the New South Wales Lands Department surveyor John Brewer Cameron, who spent two years from 1880 marking the border between NSW and Queensland, erected a post in September 1880.

The cause of this has been traced to surveyors' errors, variously due to differences between the Francis Edward Roberts and Isaiah Rowland survey between 1863 and 1865 and other surveys performed since then. The first discovery of incorrectly allocated land was in 1884 when surveyor Johnson was instructed to survey a 40-acre (160,000 m^{2}) Conditional Purchase (No. 83–10) adjacent to the border at Tweed Heads for the Government of New South Wales. The area he surveyed had already been allocated and marked by the Government of Queensland surveyors.

Other issues include historical land grants. Areas surveyed by FE Roberts were discovered, in the 1930s to have been allocated incorrectly by the Queensland Government. After attempts in 1933 to have the area resumed by NSW, the NSW government decided that as the incorrect survey had been accepted by both governments, it was unlikely to win in any court case, and accepted these areas as part of Queensland. The Queensland Government resumed 20 areas from 10 titles totalling approximately 4 hectares of land that extended across the 29 degrees south parallel.

Due to the rural area and small size of these encroachments (8 hectares), this has not caused any significant or legislative issues as has occurred previously with other border encroachment issues globally or nationally, such as the South Australia-Victoria border dispute.
