= Mungindi Bridge =

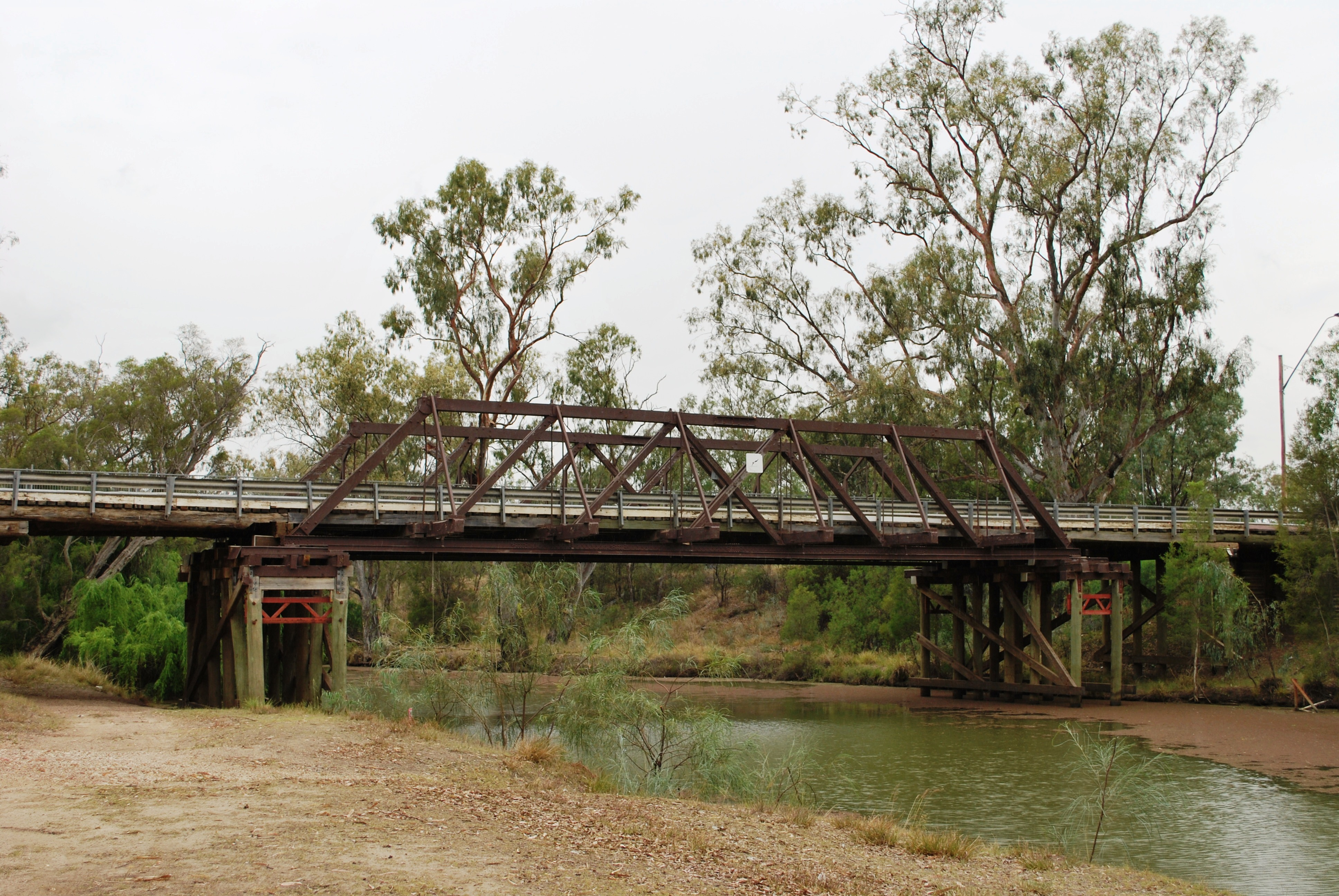
- The old timber Dare-type truss bridge looking upstream. The river forms the state border with Queensland on the left bank and New South Wales on the right.
- Coordinates: 28°58′33″S 148°59′05″E
- Carries: Carnarvon Highway: Motor vehicles; Pedestrians
- Crosses: Barwon River
- Locale: Mungindi, New South Wales
- Other name(s): Barwon River Bridge
- Maintained by: Roads & Maritime Services

Characteristics
- Material: Prestressed concrete
- Total length: 78 metres (256 ft)
- Width: 9.6 metres (31 ft)
- No. of spans: 3

History
- Constructed by: Civil Mining & Construction
- Construction end: 2010
- Replaces: Timber Dare-type truss bridge (1914–2010)

The Mungindi Bridge is a road bridge that carries the Carnarvon Highway across the Barwon River on the Queensland/New South Wales border at Mungindi, New South Wales, Australia.

== Current bridge ==
The current Mungindi Bridge is a two-lane concrete bridge with a pedestrian footpath on one side. The bridge is higher to improve flood immunity of the rural highway. Construction of the current bridge and road approaches was jointly funded by New South Wales and Queensland state governments under the Southern Queensland Accelerated Road Rehabilitation Project.

== Old bridge ==
The original Mungindi Bridge was a Dare-type truss road bridge, designed by Harvey Dare. It was one of forty Dare-type truss bridges built in New South Wales. The bridge was built by Lawson and Wladro in 1914. It was a single timber truss span of 27.7 metres (91 ft), with two timber approach spans at each end giving the bridge an overall length of 61.6 metres (202 ft).

== See also ==
- Historic bridges of New South Wales
- List of bridges in Australia
