= Scott Monk =

Australian author (born 1974)

Scott Monk (born 14 June 1974) is an Australian author.

== Life ==
Born in Macksville, New South Wales, Monk grew up in Bowraville, Lithgow and Dubbo. He attended the University of Canberra.

Monk finished his debut novel, Boyz 'R' Us, at age 19 and published it in 1996 at age 22. The novel won the Royal Blind Society's Talking Book Award the following year. He moved to Adelaide in 1996, where he joined The Advertiser as a cadet journalist. Three years later, he won South Australia's Young Journalist of the Year Award. After moving to Sydney, he worked for The Australian.

Monk is a Christian who has spoken publicly about how his faith influences his writing.

== Publications ==
- Boyz ‘R’ Us. Milsons Point: Random House Australia. 1996. ISBN 978-1-741-66018-0.
- Raw. Milsons Point: Random House Australia. 1996. ISBN 978-1-741-66012-8.
- The Crush. Milsons Point: Random House Australia. 2000. ISBN 978-1-741-66000-5.
- The Never Boys. Milsons Point: Random House Australia. 2005. ISBN 978-1-741-66006-7.
- Beyond the Knock-Knock Door. Milsons Point: Random House Australia. 2009. ISBN 978-1-741-66407-2.
