= John Brewer Cameron =

Australian surveyor (1843–1897)

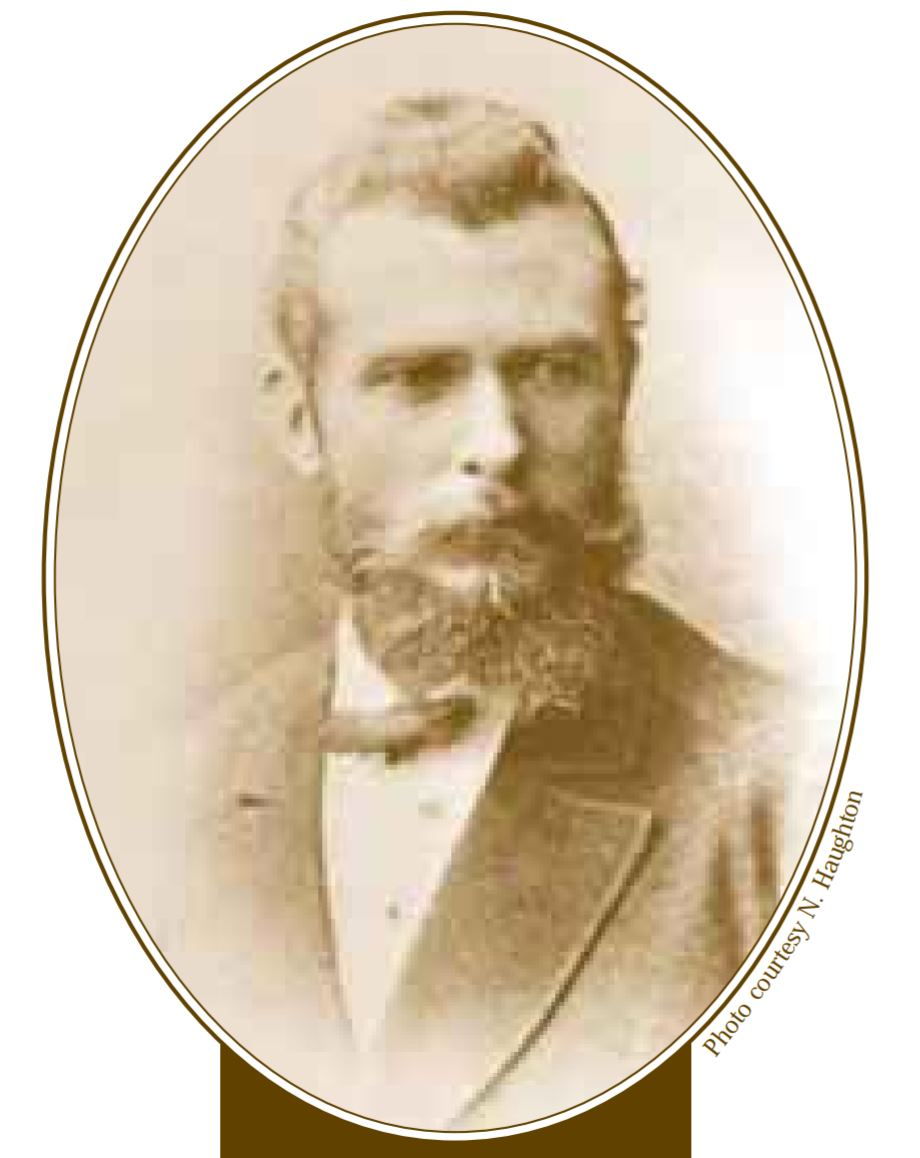
John Brewer Cameron

John Brewer Cameron (1843–1897) was a geodetic surveyor in Australia. He is best known for his survey of the border between Queensland and New South Wales. He also surveyed part of the border between South Australia and Western Australia.

== Early life ==
John Brewer Cameron was born on 31 December 1843 in Kilmonivaig, Inverness, Scotland.

== Border between Queensland and New South Wales ==
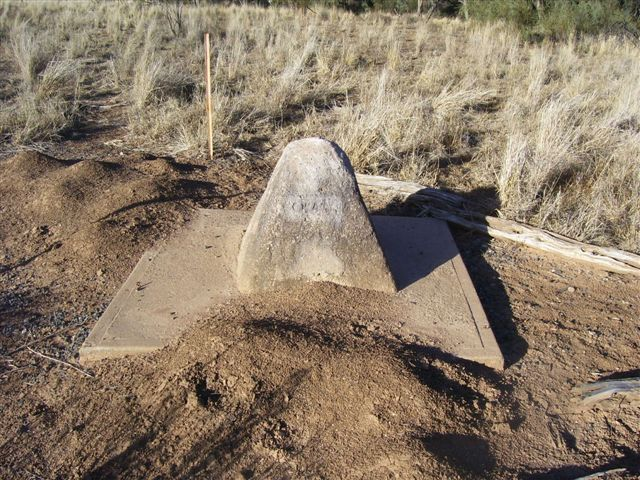
Zero Obelisk

Between 1879 and 1881 the official survey of the 29ºS parallel border between Queensland and New South Wales was conducted by Cameron (employed by the New South Wales Government) and George Chale Watson (employed by the Queensland Government).

Astronomical observations were taken at the Barringun telegraph station to determine the latitude and longitude. Following these observations, the Zero Obelisk was erected on the banks of the Warrego River, just north of the town of Barringun.

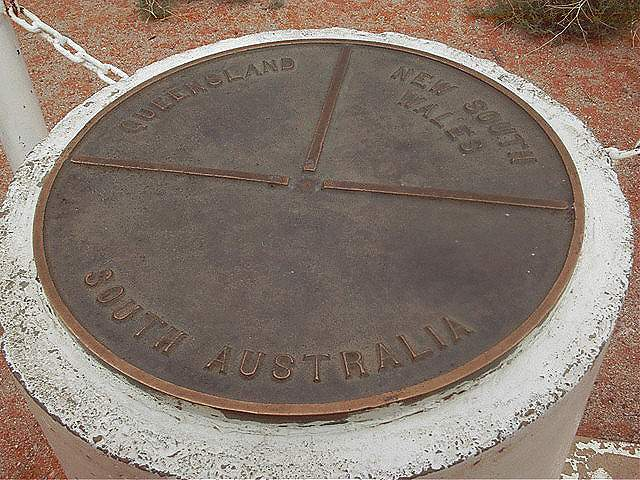
Cameron's Corner survey mark, 2001

From this mark, the first 5-mile chord was produced westerly and the mile posts offset from this chord to the arc (chord and arc are used when surveying latitude to allow for curvature of the Earth). This continued until the survey intersected longitude 141º (a point now known as Cameron Corner), a distance of 285 miles 24.96 chains. That spot is marked by the Cameron Corner Survey Marker.

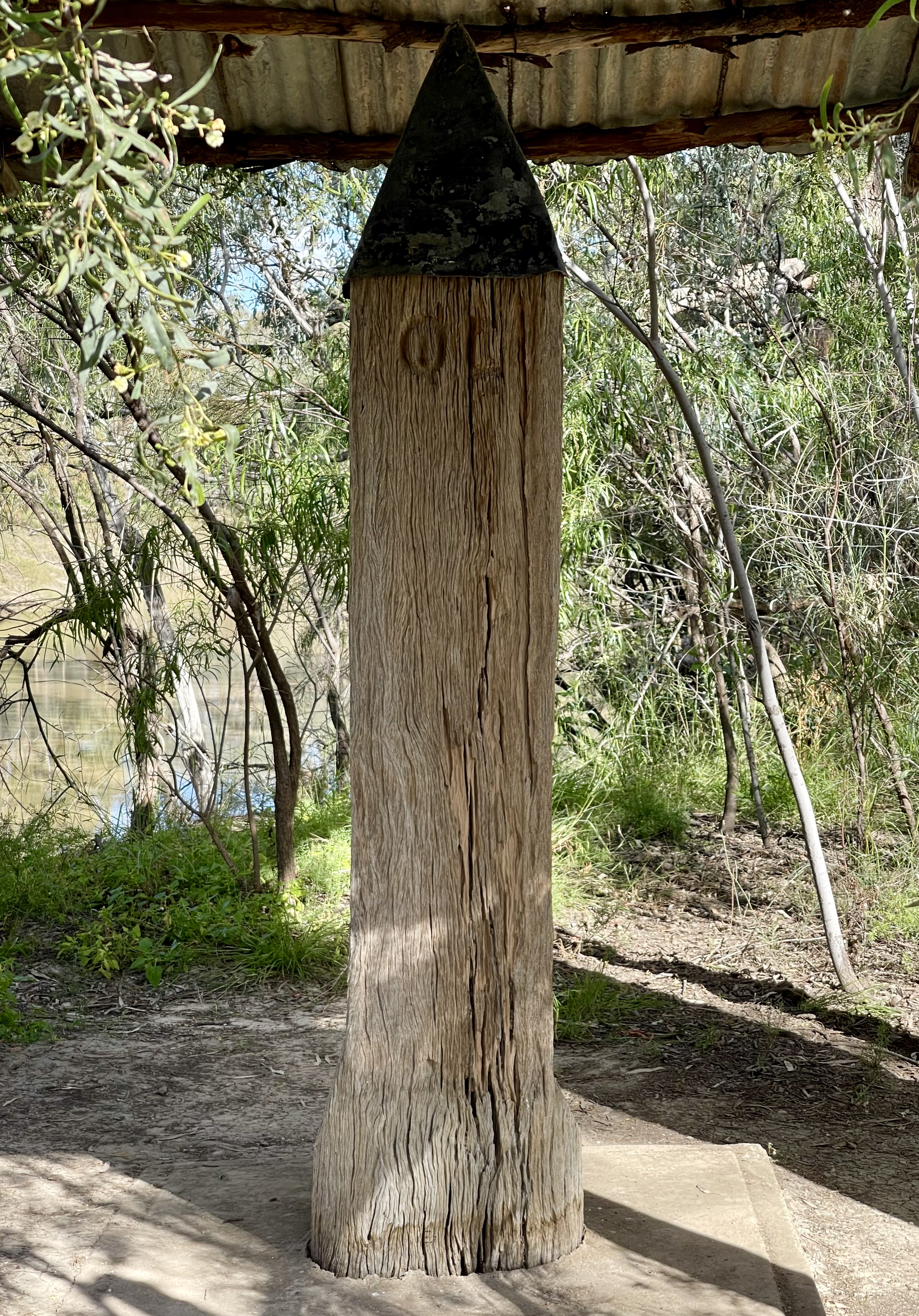
Cameron's 1 Ton Survey Post, 2021

Watson withdrew from the survey and Cameron then returned to the Zero Obelisk at Barringun and marked the line to the east in a similar fashion. Cameron then erected a 1 ton survey post on the west bank of the Barwon River to mark the end of the survey.

== New Guinea ==
For approximately the last 10 years of his life he was living in New Guinea. There he worked as a surveyor in New Guinea, mostly in the service of the government but also on private work. He owned a large amount of good land and used part of it as a plantation.

He was the first magistrate in the western part of the territory. He established the Government station at Mabaduan (9.2773°S 142.7373°E), but then relocated to Daru, leaving the station in charge of Mr Hely.

== Death ==
Cameron came to Brisbane in December 1897 to seek partners to help him develop his land in New Guinea. While there, he died of heart disease on 31 December 1897 at the Grand Hotel where he was staying. As he was unmarried and his family were in Victoria, a private funeral was arranged in Brisbane, and the Premier of Victoria communicated news of his death to his family. He was buried on 31 December 1897 in Toowong Cemetery.

== Legacy ==
The border point Cameron Corner is named after him and also the locality of Cameron Corner.

The Zero Obilisk, Cameron Corner Survey Marker and Cameron's 1 Ton Survey Post are listed on the Queensland Heritage Register.
