= Zero Obelisk =

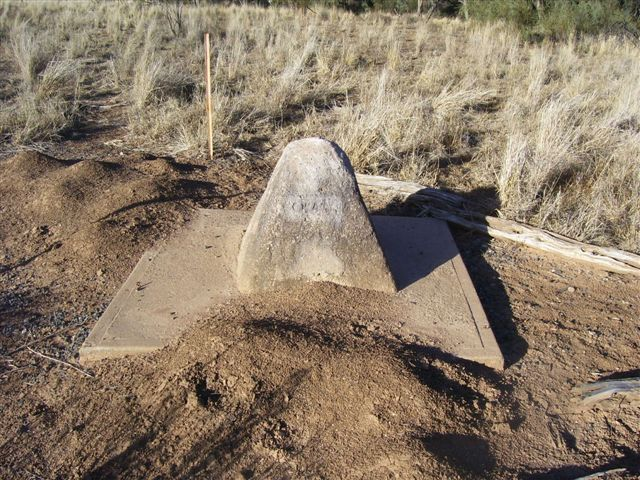
- Zero Obelisk

- Location within Queensland
- 28.9991°S 145.6688°E
- Location: East Bank, Warrego River, Barringun, Shire of Paroo, Queensland, Australia

History
- Design period: 1870s - 1890s (late 19th century)
- Built: 1879

Queensland Heritage Register
- Official name: Zero Obelisk
- Type: state heritage (built)
- Designated: 21 October 1992
- Reference no.: 600763
- Significant period: 1879 (fabric, historical)

Zero Obelisk is a heritage-listed survey marker on the east bank of the Warrego River, Barringun, Shire of Paroo, Queensland, Australia. It was established in 1879. It was added to the Queensland Heritage Register on 21 October 1992. The Zero Obelisk marks the beginning of the first official survey of the border between the colonies of Queensland and New South Wales in 1879–80.

== History ==
=== Surveyors ===
The need for an official survey of the border had been recognised for many years but the work was not begun until mid 1879, when officers from both colonies met at the telegraph station at Barringun in New South Wales which was close to the border (Latitude 29°S). The surveyors were JB Cameron and J Conder, Trigonometrical Surveyors, from New South Wales and GC Watson, Surveying Commissioner of Crown Lands, Warrego District, from Queensland.

John Brewer Cameron was born in Scotland and immigrated to Victoria with his family in 1853. Noted for being athletic and adventurous, he travelled first to the Victorian goldfields and then to New Zealand. Returning to Victoria, he joined a government geodetic surveying party working in the area near Mount Baw Baw. This experience led him to decide to take up a career in surveying. He went to Fiji as a surveyor in 1869, then returned in 1872 to Victoria where he specialised in surveying and geodesy. By 1879 he was a First Class surveyor in the Trigonometrical branch of the New South Wales Lands Department and a member of the Royal Geographical Society of New South Wales. In this year he undertook his most notable commission, to survey the border between Queensland and New South Wales.

=== Survey ===
The survey work began at Zero Obelisk at Barringun, the division of work between the surveyors being described by Cameron in a letter to his uncle, Ewen Cameron:

Mr Watson is responsible for chainage while I am for the astronomical portion in finding true meridian, giving true bearing, setting off the chords, and finding latitude at every convenient site.

After observations at Barringun to determine the latitude, the team began surveying the border in a westerly direction to the intersection with the border with South Australia at Longitude 141° E, known as Cameron Corner. This was a distance of 235 miles (378 km) over difficult country. Watson and Cameron did not get on and they had to contend first with flooding in both the Warrego and Paroo systems and then drought. Health problems and shortages of both food and water added to their problems. Watson withdrew at the one hundred mile post due to lack of water, but Cameron was determined to carry on. This section of the survey took 12 months and 15 days to complete and details of it were given in the first Annual Report of the NSW Department of Lands 1880 Appendix 1.

In 1881, Cameron returned to Barringun to survey the easterly section to the Barwon River. This 200 mile survey was easier with good water and grass available throughout. When the survey was complete Cameron commemorated the event by placing a wooden post carved with his name on the river bank (Cameron's 1 Ton Survey Post). Although this was not the first border survey, it was the official survey.

In 1883, Cameron moved to New Guinea where he carried out important surveys under the direction of Sir William MacGregor. He died on 30 December 1897 in Brisbane during a return trip to New Guinea and is buried in the Toowong Cemetery.

== Description ==
The Zero Obelisk at Barringun is a truncated pyramid of concrete render over stone, measuring 0.9 by 0.9 by 0.9 metres (2 ft 11 in × 2 ft 11 in × 2 ft 11 in) marking the Queensland - New South Wales border at Barringun. Part of an inscription on the Queensland side which reads "G. WAT" (George Chale Watson) is still visible.

== Heritage listing ==
Zero Obelisk was listed on the Queensland Heritage Register on 21 October 1992 having satisfied the following criteria.

The place is important in demonstrating the evolution or pattern of Queensland's history.

The Zero Obelisk, Barringun marks the first official survey of the border between what were then the separate colonies of New South Wales and Queensland when an accurate definition of the border was important for legal and economic reasons. It illustrates a remarkable feat of surveying in the nineteenth century and is a reminder of the extraordinarily difficult conditions under which many early surveyors worked.

The place demonstrates rare, uncommon or endangered aspects of Queensland's cultural heritage.

The Zero Obelisk is one of the few extant physical reminders of the official survey undertaking to mark the Queensland - New South Wales border.

The place has a special association with the life or work of a particular person, group or organisation of importance in Queensland's history.

As a commemoration of one of his most notable accomplishments, the obelisk has an important association with the life and career of JB Cameron and other surveyors, whose work contributed to the development of Australia.
