= Carnarvon Highway =

Highway in Australia

Carnarvon Highway Queensland–New South Wales
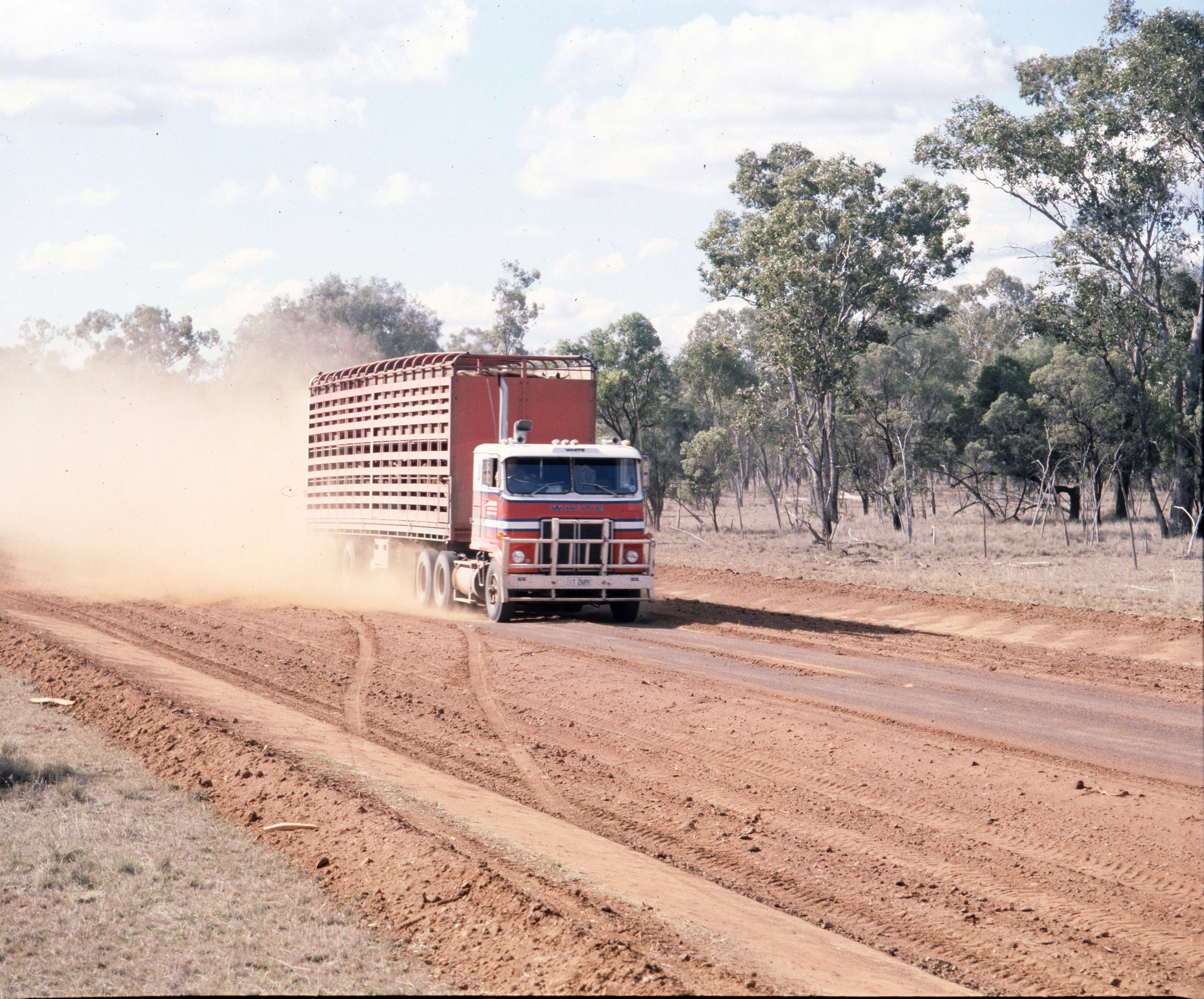
- Carnarvon Highway between St George and Surat, 1979

General information
- Type: Highway
- Length: 697 km (433 mi)
- Gazetted: November 1933 (NSW, as Main Road 232); August 1998 (NSW, as State Highway 28)
- Route number(s): A7 (2004–present) (Rolleston–Roma); A55 (2004–present) (Roma–St George); National Route 46 (1997–present) (St George–QLD/NSW border)
- Former route number: National Route 55 (1983–2004) (Rolleston–St George); National Route 55 (1983–1997) (St George–QLD/NSW border)

Major junctions
- North end: Dawson Highway; Rolleston, Queensland
- Warrego Highway; Moonie Highway; Balonne Highway; Castlereagh Highway; Barwon Highway
- South end: Gwydir Highway; Moree, New South Wales

Location(s)
- Major settlements: Injune, Roma, Surat, St George, Mungindi

Highway system
- Highways in Australia; National Highway • Freeways in Australia; Highways in Queensland; Highways in New South Wales

Carnarvon Highway is a state highway in Queensland and New South Wales, Australia, linking the township of Rolleston in Queensland's Central Highlands Region, via the town of St George, eventually to Moree in northern New South Wales. It is the main access road to the Carnarvon National Park, and serves as a strategic route to take B-doubles and other large vehicles (which cannot use Bruce Highway) to the Queensland ports north of Rockhampton.

== Route ==
Carnarvon Highway commences at the intersection with Dawson Highway just west of Rolleston in Queensland, and heads in southerly direction until it reaches Roma, where it shares a short concurrency with Warrego Highway, and continues south to St George, where it meets the Moonie, Balonne, and Castlereagh Highways. It crosses the state border at Mungindi to eventually terminate at the intersection with Gwydir Highway in Moree, in New South Wales.

== History ==
The passing of the Main Roads (Amendment) Act of 1929 (which amended the original Main Roads Act of 1924) through the Parliament of New South Wales on 8 April 1929 provided for the declaration of State Highways, Trunk Roads and Main Roads, partially funded by the State government through the Main Roads Board (later the Department of Main Roads, and eventually Transport for NSW). Main Road 232 was declared on 21 November 1933, from the intersection with Main Road 338 (Moree-Boggabilla Road, later to become Newell Highway) at Moree, via Ashley, Garah and Boomi to the state border with Queensland at Boonangar, and Main Road 367 was declared on 23 March 1937 from the intersection with Main Road 232 at Garah to the state border with Queensland at Mungindi.

The passing of the Roads Act of 1993 through the Parliament of New South Wales updated road classifications and the way they could be declared within New South Wales. Under this act, Carnarvon Highway was declared as State Highway 28 on 7 August 1998, from the intersection with Newell Highway at Moree via Ashley and Garah to the state border with Queensland at Mungindi, subsuming Main Road 367; the southern end of Main Road 232 was truncated to meet Carnarvon Highway at Garah. The highway today, as Highway 28, still retains this declaration.

It was formerly known as Carnarvon Developmental Road north of Roma.

Queensland signed its portion of Carnarvon Highway as National Route 55 between 1983 and 1997. However, New South Wales had previously signed Castlereagh Highway between Gilgandra and Walgett as National Route 55 in 1974, extending it to the border by 1983. This caused a major discrepancy for many years in that National Route 55 met the border at Mungindi but abruptly begun again over 100 kilometres (62 mi) west along the border at Hebel. The Queensland Road Department eventually changed this in 1997, diverting National Route 55 along its portion of Castlereagh Highway over the border south to Hebel; the former allocation between St George and Mungindi was then re-allocated National Route 46, however the New South Wales portion remained unallocated. With Queensland's conversion to the newer alphanumeric system in 2004, its route number was updated to route A7 between Rolleston and Roma (continuing north along Dawson and Gregory Highways to Emerald and Charters Towers), and A55 between Roma and St George; it is still allocated National Route 46 between St George and the border, and is still unallocated between the border and Moree.

== Roads of Strategic Importance upgrades ==
The Roads of Strategic Importance initiative, last updated in March 2022, includes the following projects for Carnarvon Highway.

=== Corridor upgrade ===
A lead project to upgrade the Townsville to Roma corridor, including sections of Gregory, Dawson and Carnarvon Highways and surrounding state and council roads, at an estimated cost of $125 million, commenced construction of some work projects in 2020. Planning continues for other projects.

=== Intersection upgrade Arcadia Valley Road ===
A project to upgrade the intersection with Arcadia Valley Road at a cost of $925,000 was completed in January 2022. This project was targeted for "early works" by the Queensland Government.

=== Intersection upgrade Castlereagh Highway ===
A project to upgrade the intersection with Castlereagh Highway at a cost of $3.4 million is due for completion in mid-2022. This project is targeted for "early works" by the Queensland Government.

=== Intersection upgrade Salmon Road ===
A project to upgrade the intersection with Salmon Road at a cost of $4.8 million is due for completion in mid-2022. This project is targeted for "early works" by the Queensland Government.

=== Orange Hill safety treatments ===
A project to upgrade Carnarvon Highway near Orange Hill at a cost of $3.9 million was expected to finish in late 2021. This project was targeted for "early works" by the Queensland Government.

== Other upgrades ==
=== Widen and seal ===
A project to widen and seal a section of road north of Injune, at a cost of $5.22 million, started in May 2021.

A project to widen and seal a section of road east of St George, at a cost of $4.5 million, was completed in August 2021.

=== Replace steel culvert ===
A project to replace a steel culvert just east of Surat, at a cost of $3.6 million, was completed in October 2021.

=== Widen and replace culvert ===
A project to widen and replace a culvert north of Roma, at a cost of $1.36 million, started in September 2021.

== Proposals ==
The Queensland Inland Freight Route is a proposal to upgrade the existing highways from Charters Towers to Mungindi. This would involve significant upgrades to Carnarvon Highway between Rolleston and Mungindi.

== List of towns on the Carnarvon Highway ==
- Moree
- Ashley
- Garah
- Mungindi
- St George
- Surat
- Roma
- Injune
- Rolleston

== Major intersections ==
State	LGA	Location	km	mi	Destinations	Notes
Queensland	Central Highlands	Rolleston	0	0.0	Dawson Highway (A7 west, State Route 60 east) – Springsure, Moura, Blackwater	Northern terminus of highway, route A7 continues west along Dawson Highway
Queensland	Maranoa	Roma	263	163	Warrego Highway (A2 west) – Mitchell	Concurrency with route A2; Southern terminus of route A7, northern terminus of route A55
Queensland	Maranoa	Roma	269	167	Warrego Highway (A2 east) – Miles, Brisbane	Concurrency with route A2; Southern terminus of route A7, northern terminus of route A55
Queensland	Maranoa	Surat	343	213	Surat Developmental Road (State Route 87) – Meandarra	
Queensland	Balonne	St George	449	279	Moonie Highway (State Route 49 east) – Dalby	Concurrency with State Route 49
Queensland	Balonne	St George	459	285	Balonne Highway (State Route 49 west) – Mitchell, Cunnamulla	Concurrency with State Route 49
Queensland	Balonne	St George	466	290	Castlereagh Highway (A55) – Dirranbandi, Hebel	Route A55 continues south along Castlereagh Highway; Northern terminus of National Route 46
Queensland	Balonne	Nindigully	503	313	Barwon Highway (State Route 85) – Goondiwindi	
Queensland	Balonne	Mungindi	577	359	Carnarvon Highway	Southern terminus of National Route 46
State border along Barwon River			577	359	Queensland – New South Wales state border	
New South Wales	Moree Plains	Mungindi	577	359	Carnarvon Highway	
New South Wales	Moree Plains	Moree	697	433	Gwydir Highway (B76) – Goondiwindi, Narrabri, Collarenebri	Southern terminus of highway
1.000 mi = 1.609 km; 1.000 km = 0.621 mi: Concurrency terminus; Route transition

== See also ==
- Highways in Australia
- List of highways in Queensland
- List of highways in New South Wales
- Mungindi Bridge
