= Cameron Corner Survey Marker =

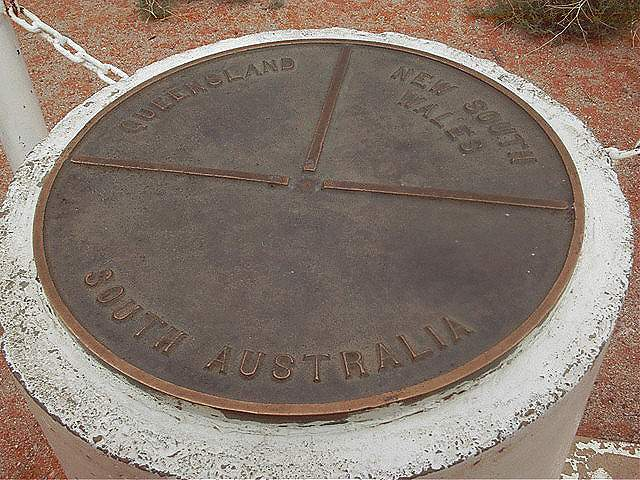
- Cameron Corner Survey Marker, 2001

- Location within Queensland
- 28.9991°S 140.9993°E
- Location: South-west Queensland, at the border corner with New South Wales and South Australia, Cameron Corner, Shire of Bulloo, Queensland, Australia

History
- Design period: 1870s–1890s (late 19th century)

Queensland Heritage Register
- Official name: Cameron Corner
- Type: state heritage (built)
- Designated: 9 November 2012
- Reference no.: 602806
- Significant period: 1880-

Cameron Corner Survey Marker is a heritage-listed survey marker in the locality of Cameron Corner, Shire of Bulloo, Queensland, Australia. The survey marker is at the border corner of South-West Queensland with New South Wales and South Australia; it was established in 1880. It was added to the Queensland Heritage Register on 9 November 2012.

== History ==
Corners of Australia

Cameron Corner Survey Marker was established in September 1880 during the first official survey of the western section of the border between Queensland and New South Wales (NSW) undertaken in 1879–1881. It defines the westernmost extension of the Queensland-New South Wales border. Its marking was a surveying feat of its time.

After debate about a suitable southern boundary for the proposed new colony to the north of New South Wales (NSW), letters patent were issued by Queen Victoria in June 1859 which separated the new Colony of Queensland from NSW. The letters patent described the border between the two colonies as having three components:

- the watershed from Point Danger (28°8"S) on the east coast west to the Dumaresq River
- a river section formed by the Dumaresq, Macintyre and Barwon Rivers to latitude 29 degrees South
- along latitude 29 degrees South to the 141st meridian of East longitude, which was the eastern boundary of South Australia.

The eastern and western sections of the border required surveying but the central river section did not.

The eastern section was surveyed between 1863 and 1866. In 1863 surveyors Francis Edward Roberts from Queensland and Isaiah Rowland from New South Wales were chosen to survey the boundary line from Point Danger west to the Dumaresq River. Starting in June, two separate surveys were carried out, and although in many instances both surveyors used the same tree to mark the border, Rowland and Roberts defined the border in different positions. At the direction of the Queensland Surveyor-General, Roberts deviated from the definable position of the watershed in order to increase the accuracy of the survey. Subsequently, the New South Wales and Queensland governments essentially adopted the survey of Roberts.

Marking the river section formed by the Dumaresq, Macintyre and Barwon Rivers to 29 degrees South took place in 1865. Queensland and New South Wales arranged for the fixing of the 29th parallel of latitude, at the intersections of the Barwon, Mooni, Bokhara, Narran, Biri and Culgoa Rivers, to enable the colonial governments to adjust the rents of leases of several pastoral runs in the vicinity, some of which were partly in both colonies. In addition, about 450,000 acres (180,000 ha) of land on the Queensland border could not be leased until its position was determined. Augustus Charles Gregory, Queensland Surveyor-General and William Albert Baylesford Greaves, NSW District Surveyor of the Northern Rivers, conducted this initial survey of latitude 29S. The marking of the border was done with steel (iron) pins one inch in diameter and two feet long, driven a few inches below the surface, radial reference bearings being taken to adjacent trees. This process was repeated at each of the above named rivers, and the work was completed in five or six weeks.

That left surveying of the western section of the border at latitude 29 degrees S to be completed. Pastoral occupation of south-west Queensland began in the 1860s. In July 1862 Sir Charles Nicholson had reported to the Secretary of State for the Colonies that: "On the west, the whole of the basin of the 'Barcoo' for several hundred miles, as far as the 142nd meridian of East longitude, is becoming rapidly occupied by squatters, and the authorised possession of the greater part of it has already, I believe, been secured under pastoral licenses...". Pastoralists began settling the Cooper and Bulloo country and the adjacent portion of South Australia in 1864 with Bulloo Downs Station being the first pastoral run in the Bulloo area. By the end of the decade the Cooper country was also settled.

During the 1870s, settlement extended west to the Diamantina, Mulligan and Georgina areas. In 1873, the pastoral districts were named – Gregory South comprised the Bulloo and lower Cooper area and the remainder became Gregory North. Initially runs in both districts were stocked with cattle and sheep. By 1885 all available land in Queensland's far south-west had been claimed. This land, comprising the floodplains of the Mulligan, Georgina, Diamantina and Bulloo Rivers and Cooper Creek, which form part of a vast inland drainage system originating in Queensland's central west and north-west and eventually reaching Lake Eyre, became known as Channel Country. During floods, the semi-arid region becomes a network of channels, watering vast grasslands suitable for cattle-fattening.

Another factor in the determination of the Queensland-NSW border was the collection of customs duties at the border and establishment of border customs offices. Inter-colonial border duties were introduced in Australia in the 1850s, after the Murray River became the boundary between New South Wales and Victoria. Their introduction demonstrated that the Australian colonies were developing in divergent and independent ways. As each new colony was declared, it established its own Customs administration, which was responsible for the collection of lucrative custom duties and the prevention of smuggling.

In mid-1862, the Queensland government assented to the provisions of the New South Wales Border Customs Act, introduced to provide for a mutual Queensland-New South Wales system of collecting customs duties payable on goods crossing their shared border. At first, the flow of goods into Queensland through the inland routes was not sufficient in either quantity or value to warrant the cost of collecting customs duty in remote areas. However, as settlement expanded, the Queensland government became concerned at the amount of revenue being lost in this way (estimated in 1870 at between £12,000 and £15,000 per annum, with approximately 340 pastoral stations, stores and public houses along the southern Queensland border being supplied primarily from New South Wales). Not only did more goods travel north than went south into New South Wales, but duty on such everyday commodities as tea and tobacco was twice as high in Queensland and a considerable amount of smuggling across the border took place.

As the western regions of the colony developed and internal trade routes were established, customs facilities were required along the borders with New South Wales and South Australia. The Customs Duties Act 1870 provided Queensland with independent legislation to regulate the collection of duties on goods imported from other colonies. A small Customs Border Patrol consisting of a police inspector, sub-inspector and four constables was appointed with powers to collect duties from 1 January 1871. They travelled along the Queensland-New South Wales border, collecting duties and keeping careful records regarding the type and value of goods and the amount of monies collected. They also recommended 11 sites where Custom offices could be established. It was soon reported that the effect of increased vigilance on the border was to concentrate the importation of goods at Brisbane, reducing the amount of such trade through inland centres.

Finally in June 1879 the surveying of the remainder of the Queensland-NSW border along the 29th parallel of south latitude extending into the Channel Country was undertaken. Survey parties from both colonies met at Barringun, near the border, and William Jacomb Conder, superintendent of the trigonometrical survey NSW, undertook preliminary work to fix the latitude of the border town on the Warrego River using astronomical observations. Having determined the position for the border and the longitude of a point on it and the direction of the true meridian found, surveyors John Brewer Cameron from NSW and George Chale Watson (Commissioner for Crown Lands for the Warrego and Gregory South) representing Queensland, started to survey westerly on 15 September 1879 from a point on the east bank of the Warrego River where they had erected the Zero Obelisk. The two surveyors divided their work with Watson being responsible for chainage and Cameron for the astronomical work required to undertake this geodetic survey. After marking the first 5-mile chord and offsetting the mileposts from this chord to the arc the work continued in this manner.

Very soon the surveyors struck floods. Cameron wrote "Had great difficulty in crossing creeks with the whole camp. The Irarah, Cuttaburra and Warrego being flooded... I had to construct two boats one of planks and the other of Canvas and frame: ... ferried eight tons ... in one afternoon including instruments". After crossing these swollen watercourses, they encountered the usual arid conditions of the south-west. In March 1880 after reaching the 100-mile post on the Paroo River, Surveyor Watson withdrew from the survey party, having written "As I believe Mr Cameron capable of working within great precision and he is evidently a painstaking officer over his professional duties, I have no reason to doubt but that the work would be precise enough for all the purposes of scientific accuracy as Mr Cameron, added to his other qualifications, has a supreme regard for his own reputation". According to Bill Kitson, Watson had other reasons for withdrawing – he resented having to continue his duties as land commissioner while working on the border survey as it meant he was unable to fully participate and made him "the laughing stock of the NSW contingent".

This left Cameron to complete the task of surveying the 29°S latitude over remote and desolate country. Cameron wrote that "At the 235-mile post we nearly lost all our horses in one night (32) owing to ... being unable to find the waterhole ... Having 100 gallons of water in camp I divided 50 gallons among the 32 horses with a little oatmeal which enabled them to travel to 'Warri Warri' Creek. I was obliged to give the horses a week's spell to recruit their strength". Cameron identified the corner between Queensland, NSW and South Australia with a timber post marked with the government arrow and LAT 29. The survey of 285 miles (459 km) from Barringun to the South Australian border had taken a total of 12 months and 15 days.

After reaching the South Australian border and marking the corner, Cameron returned to Barringun to survey the easterly section of about 200 miles (320 km) to the Barwon River, completing the entire border survey in October 1881. Cameron reported that his line passed 68.5 links (13.78 m) north of Gregory and Greave's steel pin in the Culgoa River and that its greatest distance from Gregory's 29th parallel was about three chains (60 m), at a point on the Macintyre River. He marked the end of the survey to the east with a one-ton post (Cameron's 1 Ton Survey Post) on the west bank of the Barwon River.

John Brewer Cameron was born in Scotland and migrated to Victoria with his family in 1853. After going to the Victorian goldfields and then New Zealand, he returned to Victoria and joined a government geodetic surveying party working in the Mount Baw Baw area. This experience led him to take up a career in surveying. He went to Fiji as a surveyor in 1869, returning to Victoria in 1872 where he specialised in surveying and geodesy. By 1879 he was a First Class Surveyor in the Trigonometrical Branch of the NSW Lands Department and a member of the Royal Geographical Society of New South Wales. He undertook the surveying of the Queensland-NSW border between 1879 and 1881. In 1883 he moved to New Guinea, acquired a plantation and later guided the Government Resident, Sir William MacGregor, on journeys of exploration. In 1896 Cameron became Government Surveyor of New Guinea. On 31 December 1897 he died suddenly from malaria while visiting Brisbane and was buried in Toowong cemetery. Afterwards, his former colleague in marking the NSW-Queensland border, George Watson, stated "and so passed away an energetic spirit worthy of classification as a man of genius. His boundary marks on the Queensland boundary will remain an imperishable monument of his skill as an astronomer."

Given the enormous difficulties Cameron faced in the task, his survey of the Queensland-NSW border was impressive. Current technology such as the Global Positioning System (or GPS) enables places to be pinpointed by longitude and latitude more accurately. It is now apparent that the intended corner between Queensland, New South Wales and South Australia at 29°S 141°E was not achieved. The corner surveyed by Cameron was actually 28°59′56.7″S 140°59′57.4″E. This is the location of the original corner post at Cameron Corner, which was replaced by the current concrete pillar, unveiled by the Ministers for Lands from NSW, Queensland and South Australia on 6 June 1969. The position of Cameron Corner as per Queensland's Digital Cadastral Database (DCDB), however, does not correlate with either the concrete pillar or the intended border corner. The DCDB places Cameron Corner 20 metres (66 ft) to the east of the concrete pillar and 112 metres (367 ft) north-west of its intended position of 29°S 141°E. The DCDB corner location that can be listed is that on Lot 1 AP21535. This variation in the intention and reality of the border corner shows the continued difficulties of surveying remote regions. This would be resolved by re-survey of Lot 1 on AP21535.

The Queensland Boundaries Declaratory Act 1982 confirmed "that each land boundary of the State ... as ... defined in the Letters Patent ... by reference to a parallel of latitude or a meridian of longitude is and always has been the boundary ... permanently fixed by marking it upon on the surface of the earth before 1900...".

The corner post as a survey mark is protected under the Survey and Mapping Infrastructure Act 2003 and the Survey and Mapping Infrastructure Regulation 2004 whereby a person must not interfere with a survey mark unless certain conditions are met.

Today, Cameron Corner Survey Marker is a well-known tourist destination.

== Description ==
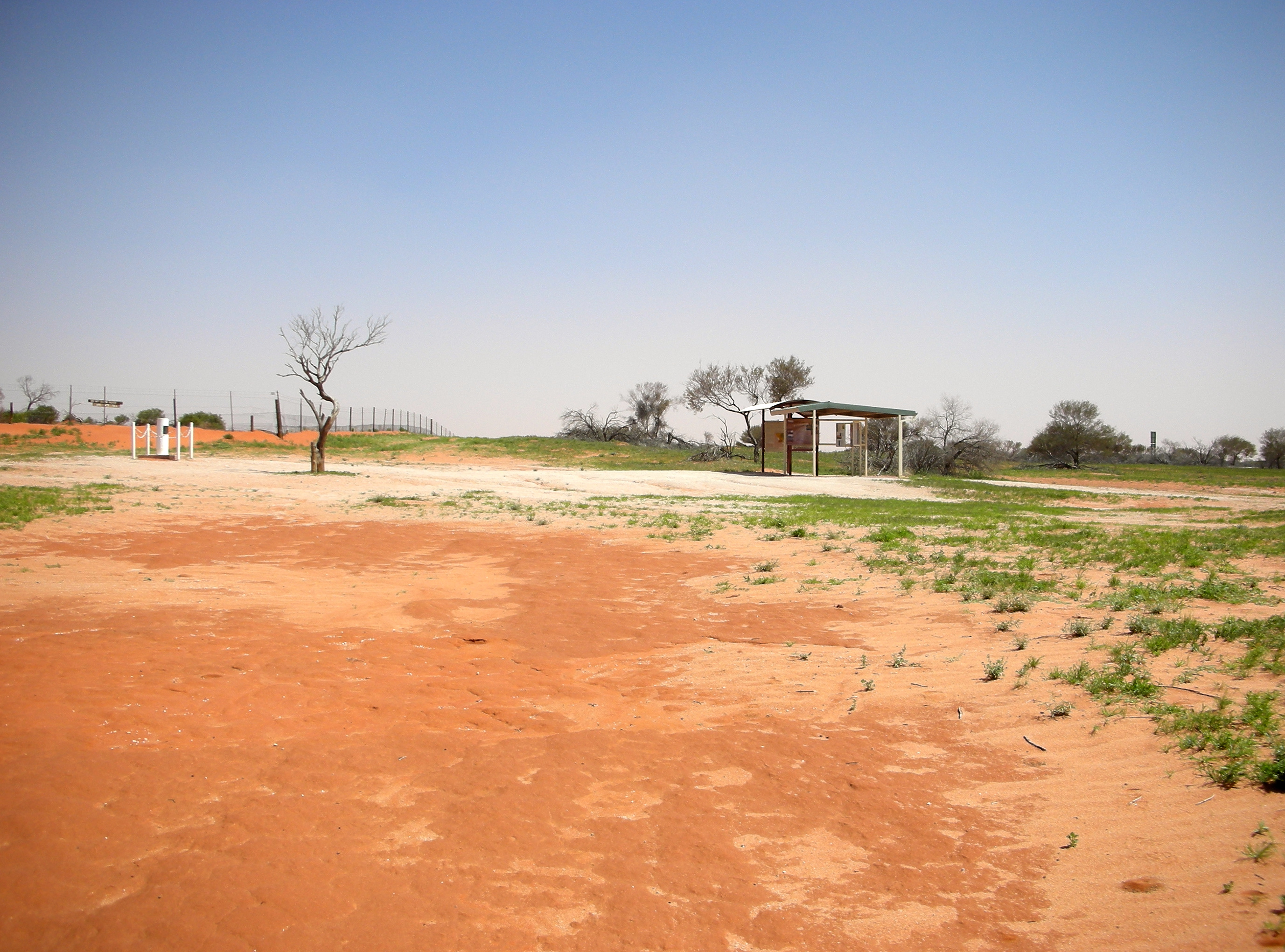
Shed and information boards, 2007

Cameron Corner Survey Marker is at the southernmost of Queensland's three south-western corners and is the westernmost point of the Queensland-New South Wales border. It is located approximately 335 kilometres (208 mi) south of Haddon Corner, 450 kilometres (280 mi) south-east of Poeppel Corner and 1,400 kilometres (870 mi) from the east coast, in an arid environment comprising ochre coloured dirt and sand with some native vegetation. The confluence of 141 degrees E and 29 degrees S (with no official marking) is located approximately 112 metres (367 ft) to the south-east.

Nearby are:

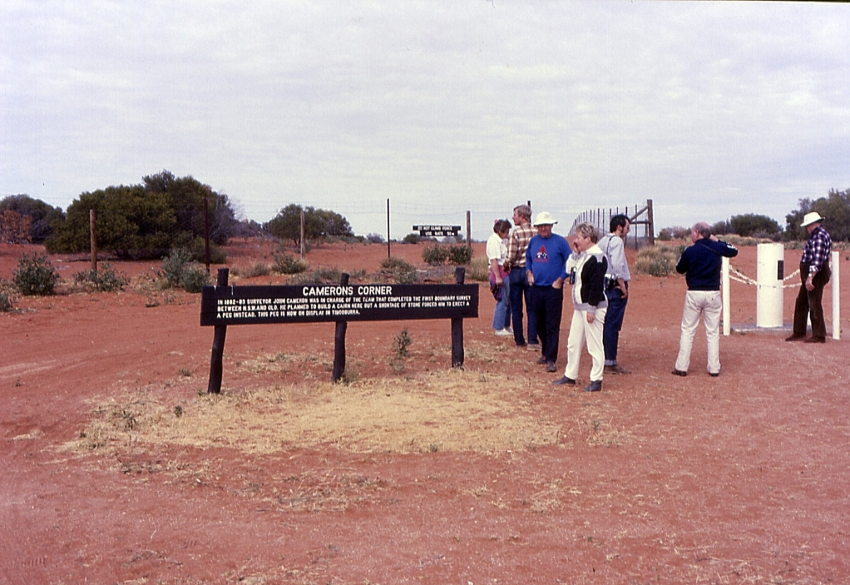
Closer view of signage and the survey post, circa 2007

- Cameron Corner Store
- a shelter shed with information boards on the NSW side of the border
- a road and road signs on the Queensland side of the border.
- part of the Dingo Fence, running parallel to the NSW border

Corners in Australia
Name	Surveyor Generals	Poeppel	Haddon	Cameron	MacCabe
States	WA/NT/SA	NT/SA/Qld	SA/Qld	SA/Qld/NSW	SA/Vic/NSW

== Heritage listing ==
Cameron Corner Survey Marker was listed on the Queensland Heritage Register on 9 November 2012 having satisfied the following criteria.

The place is important in demonstrating the evolution or pattern of Queensland's history.

Cameron Corner Survey Marker (1880), marking the westernmost extension of the first official survey of the Queensland-New South Wales border, is important in demonstrating the priority placed on clear border demarcation by the governments of Queensland and New South Wales. Set borders were an important part of colonial economic and administrative development, providing certainty for governments and pastoralists, and enabling the collection of customs duties.

Cameron Corner is the result of early cooperation between Australian colonies and provides lasting evidence of the feat of endurance necessary to complete the Queensland-New South Wales border survey.

The place is important in demonstrating a high degree of creative or technical achievement at a particular period.

Cameron Corner represents the culmination of a difficult feat of geodetic surveying and results from an early application of this branch of surveying in Queensland.

The place has a strong or special association with a particular community or cultural group for social, cultural or spiritual reasons.

Cameron Corner is important to the Australian community as a geographical and cultural landmark, and is a well-known tourist attraction.

The place has a special association with the life or work of a particular person, group or organisation of importance in Queensland's history.

Cameron Corner has an important association with the life and career of John Brewer Cameron (1843–97) as a commemoration of one of his most notable accomplishments.

== See also ==
- Border corners of Australia
- Haddon Corner
- Poeppel Corner

Corners in Australia
Name	Surveyor Generals	Poeppel	Haddon	Cameron	MacCabe
States	WA/NT/SA	NT/SA/Qld	SA/Qld	SA/Qld/NSW	SA/Vic/NSW
