= Circles of latitude between the 25th parallel south and the 30th parallel south =

Circles of latitude

Following are circles of latitude between the 25th parallel south and the 30th parallel south:

== 26th parallel south ==
26th parallel south (interactive map)

The 26th parallel south latitude is a circle of latitude that is 26 degrees south of Earth's equatorial plane. It crosses the Atlantic Ocean, Africa, the Indian Ocean, Australia, the Pacific Ocean and South America.

=== Australia ===
The 26th parallel south defines the northern border of South Australia with the Northern Territory and Queensland.

In Australia, the northernmost border of South Australia, and the southernmost border of the Northern Territory are defined by 26° south.

Additionally, 26° south also defines an approximately 127 metre section of the Western Australia/Northern Territory border at Surveyor Generals Corner due to inaccuracies in the 1920s for fixing positions under constraints of available technology.

The parallel also defines part of the Queensland and South Australia border between the 138th and 141st meridians east.

=== Around the world ===
Starting at the Prime Meridian and heading eastwards, the parallel 26° south passes through:

Coordinates	Country, territory or ocean	Notes
26°0′S 0°0′E	Atlantic Ocean	
26°0′S 14°57′E	Namibia	
26°0′S 20°0′E	South Africa	Northern Cape
26°0′S 20°49′E	Botswana	
26°0′S 22°43′E	South Africa	North West; Gauteng - passing just north of Johannesburg; Mpumalanga
26°0′S 31°6′E	Eswatini	
26°0′S 32°34′E	Mozambique	
26°0′S 32°34′E	Indian Ocean	Maputo Bay - passing just south of Maputo, Mozambique
26°0′S 32°55′E	Mozambique	Inhaca Island
26°0′S 32°59′E	Indian Ocean	
26°0′S 113°6′E	Australia	Western Australia - Dirk Hartog Island
26°0′S 113°11′E	Indian Ocean	Shark Bay
26°0′S 113°33′E	Australia	Western Australia - Peron Peninsula
26°0′S 113°43′E	Indian Ocean	L'Haridon Bight, Shark Bay
26°0′S 113°52′E	Australia	Western Australia - Peron Peninsula
26°0′S 113°54′E	Indian Ocean	Hamelin Pool, Shark Bay
26°0′S 114°11′E	Australia	Western Australia; Western Australia / Northern Territory border (~127 metres at Surveyor Generals Corner on the 129th meridian east); Northern Territory / South Australia border South Australia / Queensland border (from Poeppel Corner on the 138th meridian east); Queensland (from Haddon Corner on the 141st meridian east)
26°0′S 153°9′E	Pacific Ocean	Coral Sea
26°0′S 163°44′E	Pacific Ocean	
26°0′S 70°38′W	Chile	
26°0′S 68°26′W	Argentina	
26°0′S 57°51′W	Paraguay	
26°0′S 54°41′W	Argentina	
26°0′S 53°48′W	Brazil	Paraná; Santa Catarina
26°0′S 48°36′W	Atlantic Ocean	

== 27th parallel south ==
27th parallel south (interactive map)

The 27th parallel south is a circle of latitude that is 27 degrees south of the Earth's equatorial plane. It crosses the Atlantic Ocean, Africa, the Indian Ocean, Australasia, the Pacific Ocean and South America.

At this latitude the sun is visible for 13 hours, 52 minutes during the December solstice and 10 hours, 24 minutes during the June solstice.

=== Around the world ===
Starting at the Prime Meridian and heading eastwards, the parallel 27° south passes through:

Coordinates	Country, territory or ocean	Notes
27°0′S 0°0′E	Atlantic Ocean	
27°0′S 15°14′E	Namibia	
27°0′S 20°0′E	South Africa	Northern Cape, also North West, Free State and Mpumalanga
27°0′S 30°58′E	Eswatini	
27°0′S 31°59′E	South Africa	KwaZulu-Natal (bordering Eswatini)
27°0′S 32°52′E	Indian Ocean	
27°0′S 113°49′E	Australia	Western Australia; South Australia; Queensland - mainland and Bribie Island
27°0′S 153°10′E	Pacific Ocean	Passing just north of Moreton Island, Queensland, Australia; Passing just north of Easter Island, Chile
27°0′S 70°47′W	Chile	
27°0′S 68°18′W	Argentina	Passing near the cities of Resistencia (27°27′05″S 58°59′12″W), Corrientes (27°29′S 58°49′W) and Posadas (27°22′S 55°54′W).
27°0′S 58°30′W	Paraguay	
27°0′S 55°25′W	Argentina	
27°0′S 53°44′W	Brazil	Santa Catarina
27°0′S 48°35′W	Atlantic Ocean	

== 28th parallel south ==
28th parallel south (interactive map)

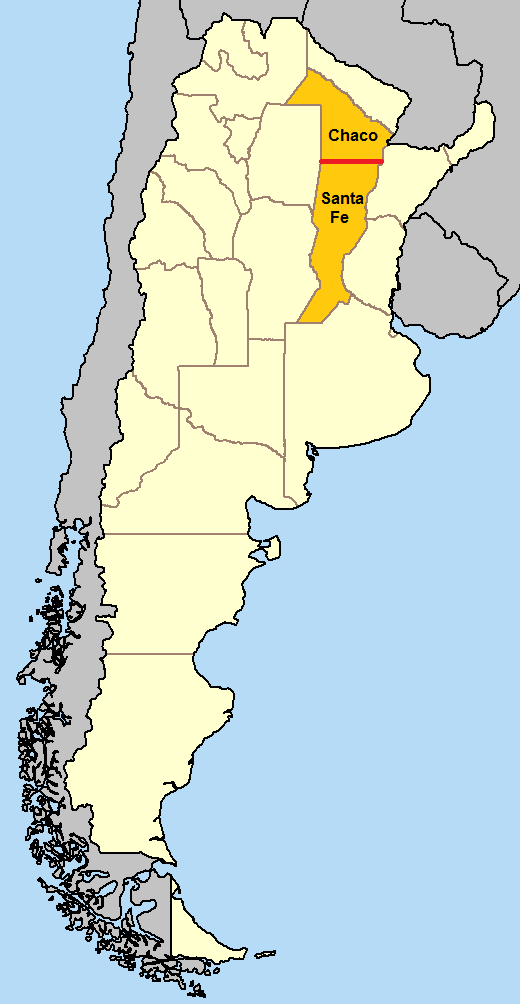
In Argentina, the 28th parallel south defines the border between Chaco Province and Santa Fe Province.

The 28th parallel south is a circle of latitude that is 28 degrees south of the Earth's equatorial plane. It crosses the Atlantic Ocean, Africa, the Indian Ocean, Australasia, the Pacific Ocean and South America.

At this latitude the sun is visible for 13 hours, 57 minutes during the December solstice and 10 hours, 19 minutes during the June solstice.

=== Around the world ===
Starting at the Prime Meridian and heading eastwards, the parallel 28° south passes through:

Coordinates	Country, territory or ocean	Notes
28°0′S 0°0′E	Atlantic Ocean	
28°0′S 15°42′E	Namibia	
28°0′S 20°0′E	South Africa	Northern Cape; North West - for about 15 km Northern Cape - for about 25 km North West - for about 21 km Free State; KwaZulu-Natal
28°0′S 32°35′E	Indian Ocean	
28°0′S 114°8′E	Australia	Western Australia; South Australia; Queensland, notably Gold Coast, Queensland by the Pacific
28°0′S 153°26′E	Pacific Ocean	just south of Marotiri, French Polynesia
28°0′S 71°9′W	Chile	
28°0′S 69°15′W	Argentina	Inland it notably demarcates the chief southern border of Chaco Province, namely with Santa Fe Province.
28°0′S 55°23′W	Brazil	Rio Grande do Sul; Santa Catarina: notably just south of Florianópolis by the Atlantic
28°0′S 48°38′W	Atlantic Ocean	

== 29th parallel south ==
29th parallel south (interactive map)

In Australia, the parallel defines most of the border between Queensland and New South Wales.

The 29th parallel south is a circle of latitude that is 29 degrees south of the Earth's equatorial plane. It crosses the Atlantic Ocean, Africa, the Indian Ocean, Australasia, the Pacific Ocean and South America.

In Australia, much of the border between Queensland and New South Wales is defined by the parallel.

=== Around the world ===
Starting at the Prime Meridian and heading eastwards, the parallel 29° south passes through:

Coordinates	Country, territory or ocean	Notes
29°0′S 0°0′E	Atlantic Ocean	
29°0′S 16°43′E	South Africa	Northern Cape; Free State
29°0′S 27°43′E	Lesotho	
29°0′S 29°9′E	South Africa	KwaZulu Natal
29°0′S 31°44′E	Indian Ocean	
29°0′S 114°45′E	Australia	Western Australia; South Australia; Queensland / New South Wales border — note that the border occasionally diverts slightly north and south of the parallel New South Wales; Queensland; New South Wales
29°0′S 153°29′E	Pacific Ocean	
29°0′S 168°1′E	Norfolk Island	
29°0′S 168°3′E	Pacific Ocean	Passing just north of Raoul Island, New Zealand
29°0′S 71°30′W	Chile	
29°0′S 69°44′W	Argentina	
29°0′S 56°25′W	Brazil	Rio Grande do Sul; Santa Catarina
29°0′S 49°25′W	Atlantic Ocean	

== 30th parallel south ==
30th parallel south (interactive map)

The 30th parallel south is a circle of latitude that is 30 degrees south of the Earth's equator. It stands one-third of the way between the equator and the South Pole and crosses Africa, the Indian Ocean, Australia, the Pacific Ocean, South America and the Atlantic Ocean.

If Earth were a perfect sphere, this would be the parallel that divides the Southern Hemisphere's area in half. However due to Earth's oblateness, the true latitude that does so lies a little bit to the north.

At this latitude the sun is visible for 14 hours, 5 minutes during the summer solstice and 10 hours, 13 minutes during the winter solstice. At solar noon on 21 December, the sun is at 83.83 degrees up in the sky and at 36.17 degrees on 21 June.

=== Around the world ===
Starting at the Prime Meridian and heading eastwards, the parallel 30° south passes through:

Coordinates	Country, territory or ocean	Notes
30°0′S 0°0′E	Atlantic Ocean	South Atlantic Ocean
30°0′S 17°9′E	South Africa	Northern Cape; Free State
30°0′S 27°14′E	Lesotho	
30°0′S 29°1′E	South Africa	KwaZulu-Natal - passing just south of Durban
30°0′S 30°57′E	Indian Ocean	
30°0′S 114°57′E	Australia	Western Australia; South Australia; New South Wales – passing just north of Woolgoolga
30°0′S 153°13′E	Pacific Ocean	Passing between islands in the Kermadec chain, New Zealand
30°0′S 71°24′W	Chile	Coquimbo Region - passing just south of Coquimbo
30°0′S 69°55′W	Argentina	San Juan Province; La Rioja Province; Catamarca Province - Lago Salinas Grandes; Córdoba Province; Santiago del Estero Province; Santa Fe Province; Corrientes Province
30°0′S 57°20′W	Brazil	Rio Grande do Sul - passing through Porto Alegre
30°0′S 50°7′W	Atlantic Ocean	

== See also ==
- Circles of latitude between the 20th parallel south and the 25th parallel south
- Circles of latitude between the 30th parallel south and the 35th parallel south
- Northern Territory borders
- South Australian borders
