= Torfhaus =

- Ortsteil of Altenau
- Interactive map of Torfhaus
- Location within Germany Location within Lower Saxony
- Coordinates: 51°48′09″N 10°32′12″E
- Country: Germany
- State: Lower Saxony
- District: Goslar
- Town: Altenau
- Elevation: 780 m (2,560 ft)
- Time zone: UTC+01:00 (CET)
  - Summer (DST): UTC+02:00 (CEST)
- Postal codes: 38667
- Dialling codes: 05320

Torfhaus is a village in the borough of the mining town of Altenau in the Harz mountains of Germany and lies at a height of about 800 m above sea level (NN). It is the highest settlement in Lower Saxony.

This small settlement consists mainly of restaurants, youth hostels, ski huts and large car parks. A resort area with hotel and cabins was built in 2012/2013. The B 4 federal road, which is a major traffic route, runs from Brunswick to the north via Torfhaus to Braunlage and on into the South and East Harz.

Today Torfhaus is a popular start point for walks along the Goethe Way to the Brocken, but also to the historic Dreieckiger Pfahl boundary stone and on over the mountains of the Wurmberg or Achtermannshöhe to Braunlage.

== Geography ==
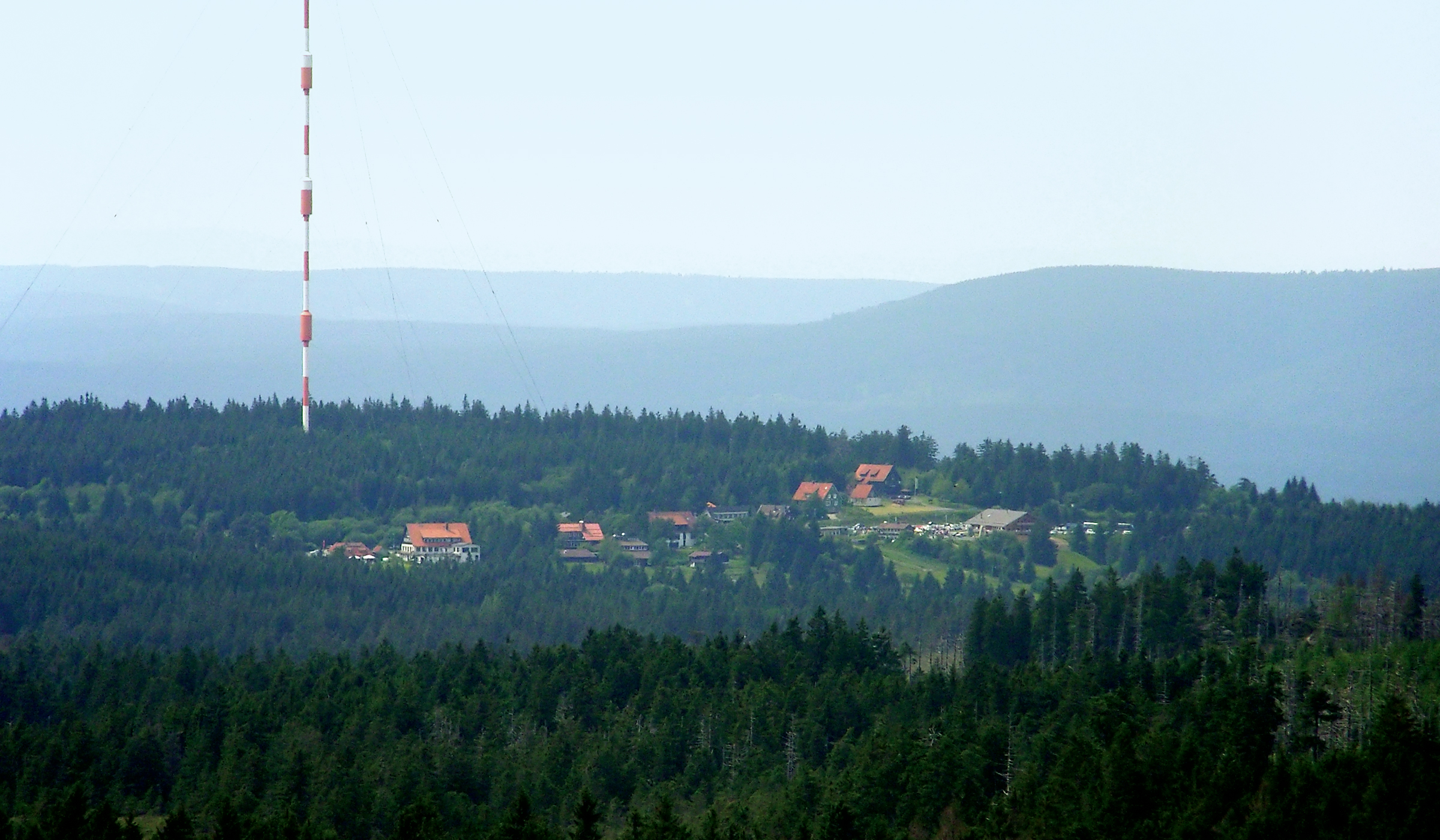
View of Torfhaus from the Goethe Way

Torfhaus lies about 7 km east of Altenau and roughly 9 km south of Bad Harzburg in the Upper Harz. The river Radau rises east of Torfhaus on the Torfhaus Moor (also called Radauborn Moor).

== Tourism and sport ==
Torfhaus lies at the heart of the Harz National Park and has inter alia a national park visitor centre, opened in 2009, as well as a youth hostel run by the German Youth Hostel Association. Numerous hiking trails, such as the Goethe Way, that runs to the Brocken, and is part of the Harz Witches' Trail, and mountain biking trails run through Torfhaus. Racing and touring cyclists generally prefer to cycle to Torfhaus via the Landstraße 504 from Altenau, which is also called the "Steep Face" (Steile Wand); The Bundesstraße 4, with its heavy motor traffic, is only used for round trips as an unavoidable route section. The cafe Brockenblick ("Brocken view") is a popular meeting point for motorcyclists. In winter, Torfhaus has various cross country skiing routes as well as hiking trails. There is also a toboggan run with a lift and a ski slope with a drag lift.

The Goethe Way runs along the Torfhausmoor (a raised bog). It is accessible on a board walk installed by the national park and enables as good view of the Brocken.

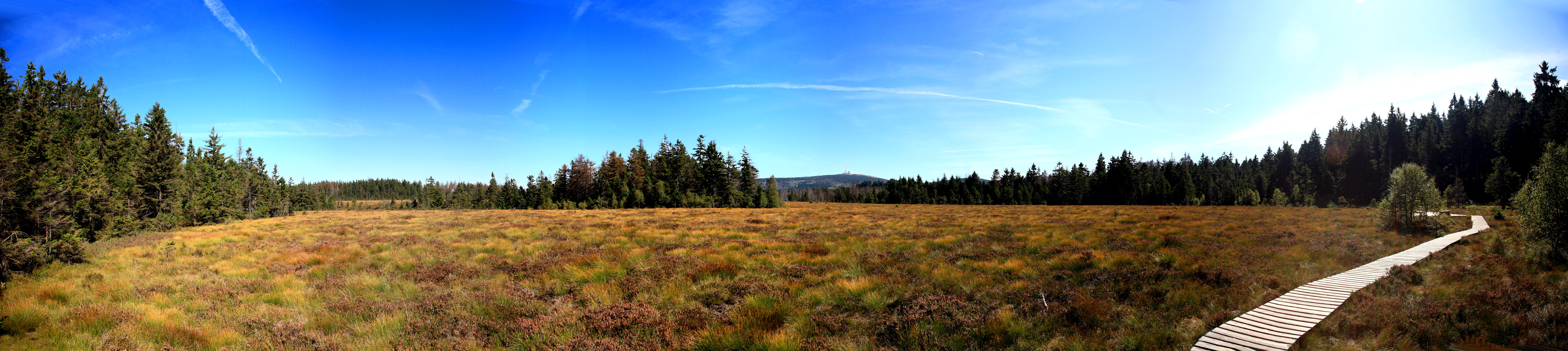
View over the raised bog to the Brocken
