= Dreieckiger Pfahl =

Boundary stone in Germany

Coordinates: 51°46′54.84″N 10°34′43.21″E

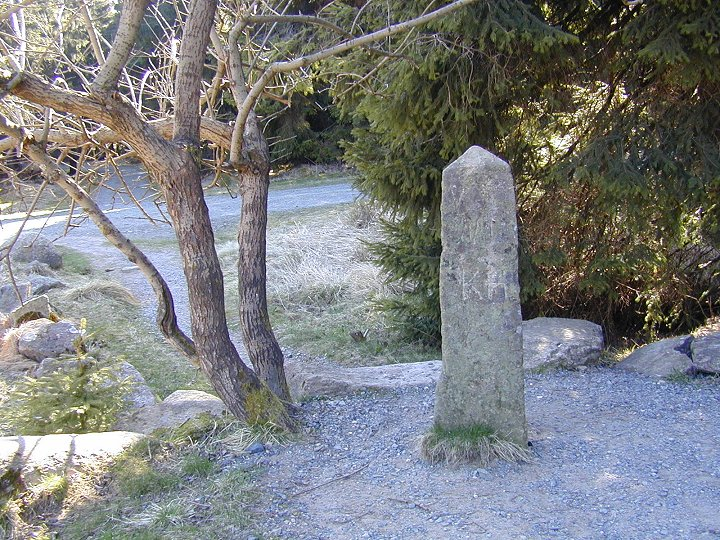
Dreieckiger Pfahl

The Dreieckige Pfahl ("Triangular Post") is a historic boundary stone, about 1.35 metres high and made of granite, located southwest of the Brocken, the highest mountain in the Harz Mountains of central Germany. The stone, erected before 1866, marked the border between the Kingdom of Hanover and the Duchy of Brunswick. Originally this spot was a tripoint. During the division of Germany the border between the German Democratic Republic and the Federal Republic of Germany ran past the Dreieckiger Pfahl. Today it marks the border between the states of Saxony-Anhalt and Lower Saxony, the post lying just within the Lower Saxon side. During the Cold War it was accessible from the west.

The historic stone stands at an elevation of about 870 metres, around 2.5 kilometres east of a car park on the B 4 federal road between Torfhaus and Oderbrück.

The first recorded mention of a boundary stone being located here dates to the year 1727. On a map of the Upper Forest of Braunlage (Oberforst Braunlage) is the note "drey Eckjer Pfahl anno 1698". From a description of the Harzburg Forest (Harzburger Forsten) the original stone is described thus:

Solcher Pfahl ist auch nach Communion Seite zur linken Hand mit Nr. 1 und einer Wolfsangel, nach Braunlagischer Seite mit drey Hieben und auf Elbingeroder Seite mit Nr. 1 und einem Kreuz ingleichen mit der Jahreszahl 1698 gesetzt und hat dabei seinen Namen erhalten.

...which translates roughly as...

Such a post was also erected with a No. 1 and a wolfsangel inscribed on the left hand side facing Communion, three gashes on the Elbingerode side, and a No. 1 and a cross with the year 1698 inscribed on the Braunlage side; hence its name.

The boundary markers were subsequently replaced on a regular basis. In 1736 a wooden post was erected and, in 1791, one made of stone. In 1844 a new post was made in oakwood.

The present triangular stone was erected before 1866. It bears the No. 1 and, on its northeastern and southwestern sides the letters KH for Kingdom of Hanover, and on the southeastern side the letters HB for the Duchy of Brunswick (Herzogtum Braunschweig). The original triangular shape was retained.

In 1894 a railway station was planned at the site of the Dreieckiger Pfahl. Engineer Louis Degen, who had drawn up plans for a Harz railway running on the territory of Brunswick from Walkenried via Wieda to Braunlage (later called the South Harz Railway), envisaged an extension of the line to the most northerly point of this piece of Brunswick terrain – the district of Blankenburg.

Previously, in 1892, the construction of a road requested by several parishes in the West Harz, which would have branched off at the Dreieckiger Pfahl from the road from Torfhaus/Oderbrück to Schierke and run to the Brocken Road, had been refused by the Chamber of the Principality of Stolberg-Wernigerode.

The station was to have been equipped with a run-around loop. However the railway was only built as far as Braunlage. A goods track ran to the north of Braunlage to the granite quarry on the Wurmberg mountain, but it never reached the Dreieckiger Pfahl.

Until 1945 there was a small restaurant at the Dreieckiger Pfahl, which was mainly frequented by hikers to the Brocken. The building was burnt down by American troops in April 1945, because SS and Wehrmacht soldiers as well as Hitler Youth had been hiding in huts in this area. The pub was never rebuilt.

Today, there is a rest area for hikers and mountain bikers in the vicinity of the Dreieckiger Pfahl as well as box no. 168 on the Harzer Wandernadel network of hiking checkpoints.
