= Boundary marker =

Physical marker that identifies a land boundary

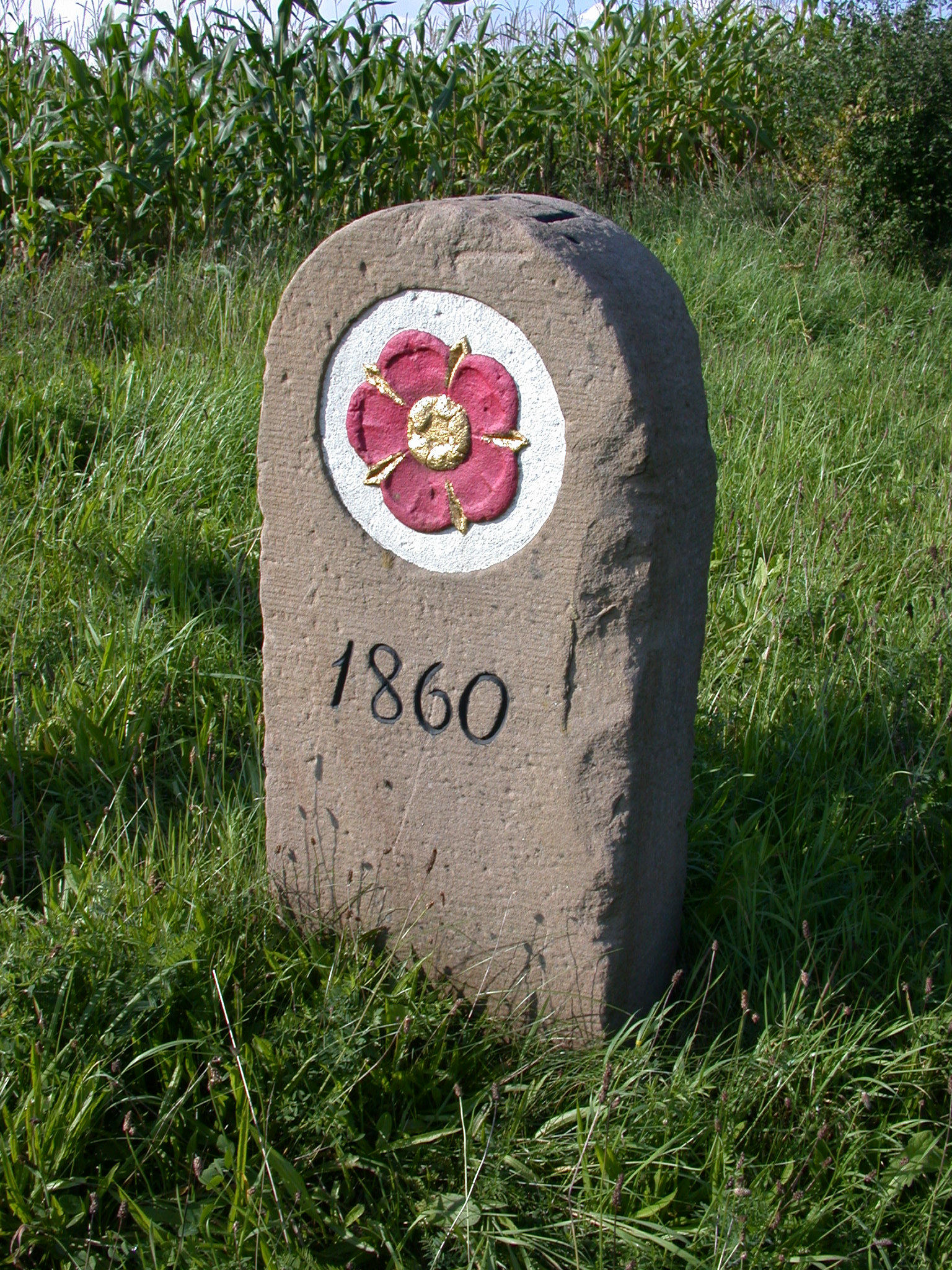
Historical boundary stone between the Principality of Lippe and the Kingdom of Prussia.

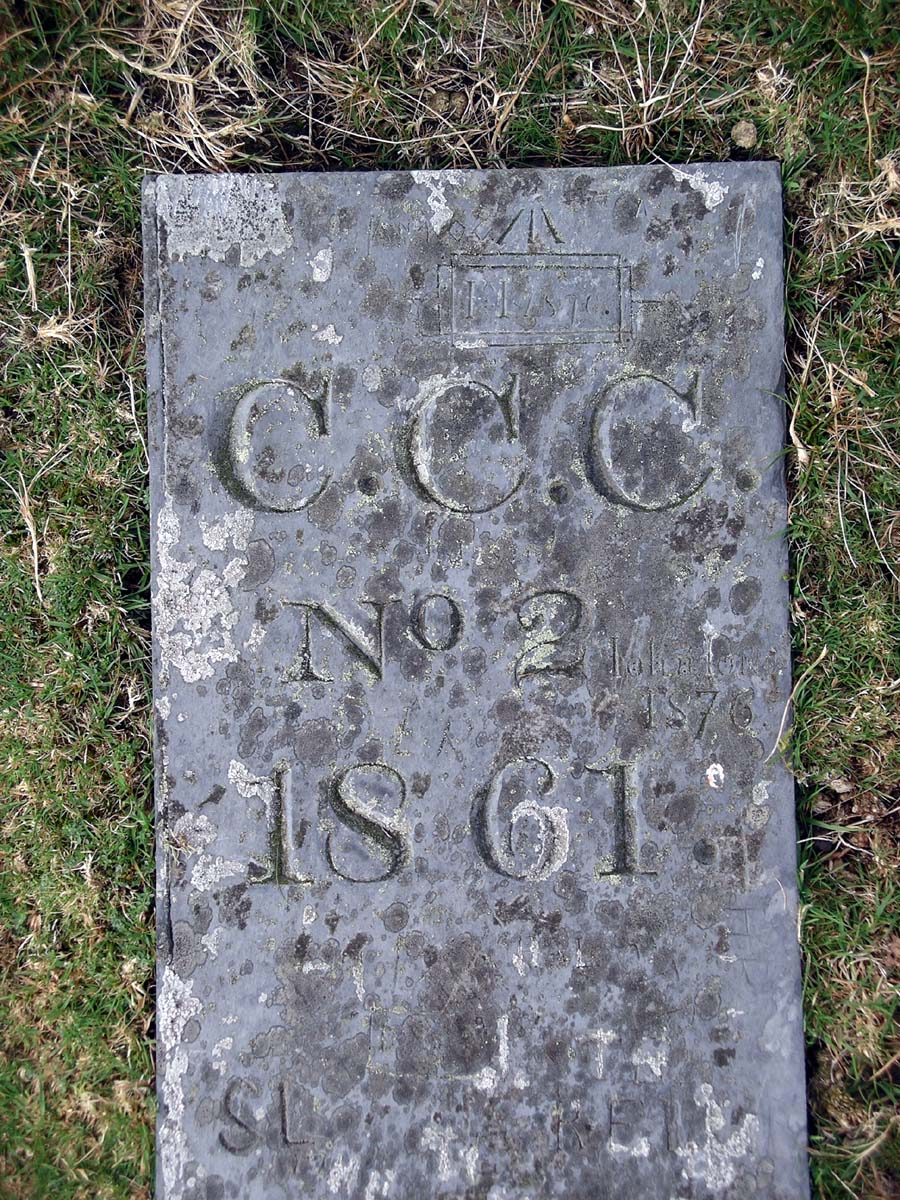
A slate boundary stone on Maesglase

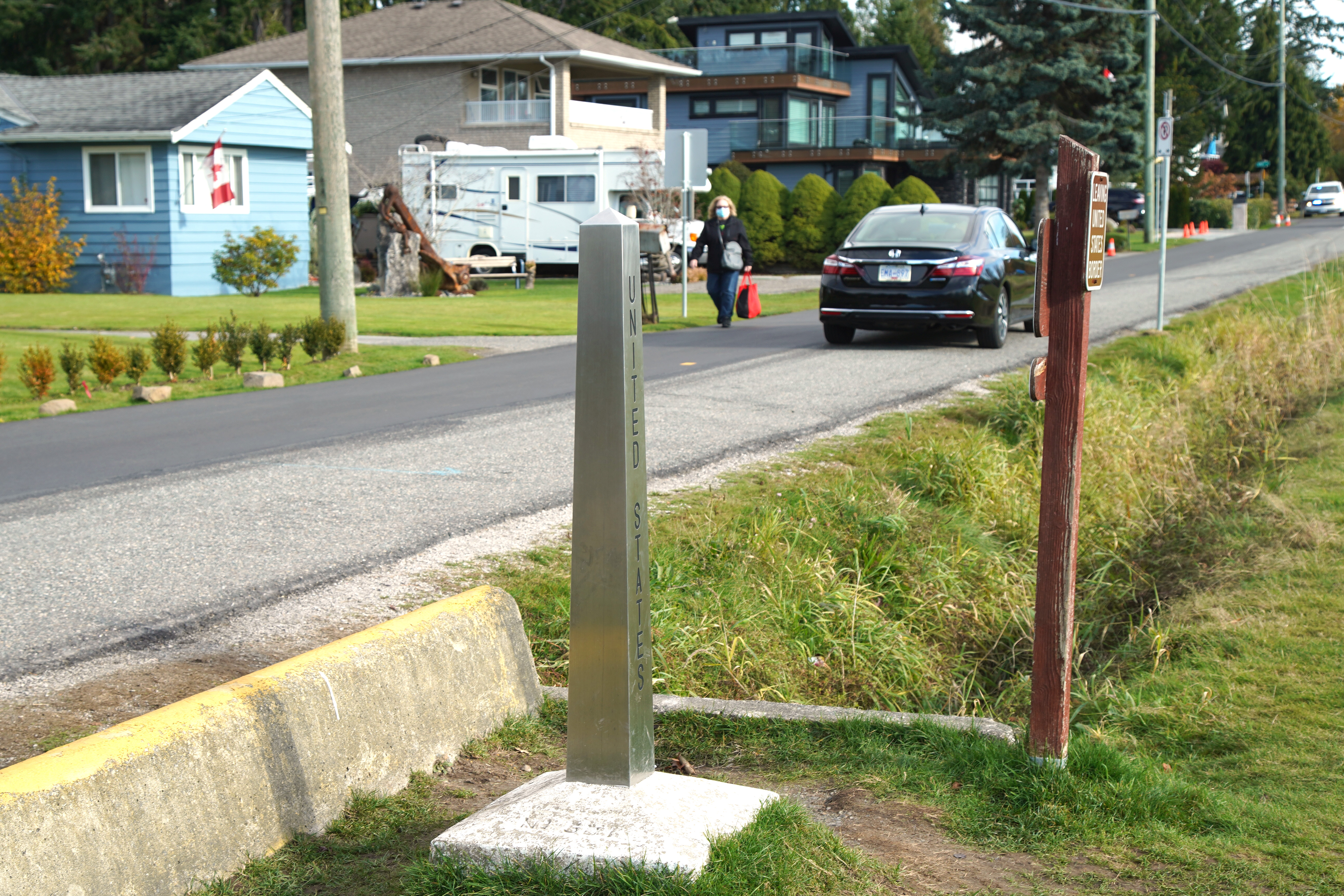
A boundary marker on 0 Avenue between Canada (left) and the United States (right)

A boundary marker, border marker, boundary stone, or border stone is a robust physical marker that identifies the start of a land boundary or the change in a boundary, especially a change in direction of a boundary. There are several other types of named border markers, known as boundary trees, pillars, monuments, obelisks, and corners. Border markers can also be markers through which a border line runs in a straight line to determine that border. They can also be the markers from which a border marker has been fixed.

== Purpose ==
According to Josiah Ober, boundary markers are "a way of imposing human, cultural, social meanings upon a once-undifferentiated natural environment." Boundary markers are linked to social hierarchies, since they derive their meaning from the authority of a person or group to declare the limits of a given space of land for political, social or religious reasons. Ober notes that "determining who can use parcels of arable land and for what purpose, has immediate and obvious economic implications."

Many borders were drawn along invisible lines of latitude or longitude, which often created a need to mark these borders on the ground, as accurately as possible, using the technology of the day. Advances in GPS technology have shown that there are many borders inaccurately marked on the ground.

Boundary markers have often been used to mark critical points on political boundaries, i.e. those between countries, states or local administrations, but have also been used to mark out the limits of private landholdings, especially in areas where fences or walls are impractical or unnecessary.

Boundary markers are integral to boundary law in the United States, both in the original colonial states and those added later during westward expansion (otherwise known as the Public Land Survey System). Man-made boundary markers, or monuments, are considered to be second-highest in the Order of Evidence in boundary law in the United States, behind only natural markers such as boulders and rivers. Boundary markers also have legal meaning in Japan, and are generally installed across the country. Markers are still used extensively for marking international borders, which are traditionally classified into two categories: natural boundaries, correlating to topographical features such as rivers or mountain ranges, and artificial boundaries, which have no obvious relation to topography. The latter category includes borders defined by boundary markers such as stones and walls. International boundary markers are placed and can be maintained by mutual agreement of the bordering countries.

== Construction ==
Boundary markers, traditionally, were often made of stone, but later many have been made with concrete or a mixture of materials. They are typically placed at a notable or especially visible point. Many are inscribed with relevant information such as the abbreviation of the boundary holder and often a date.

== History ==
=== Asia ===
==== China ====
The oldest known boundary stone in China is from Jiangsu Province. Dating from 12 A.D., it bears the inscription "the sea area from Jiaozhou Bay to the east of Guixan county belongs to Langya Shire and the waters from the south of Guixan county to the east of the estuary of Guanhe River belongs to Donghai Shire". More recently, the border between Russia and China was formally demarcated with boundary stones as the result of the Treaty of Kiakhta in 1727. In the nineteenth century, stones were used to outline the limits of the International Settlement in Shanghai.

==== Thailand ====
In ancient Thailand, sacred boundary stones called Sema Hin delimited Buddhist temple precincts. In some cases they feature inscriptions recounting the history of the temple; others were carved with wheels of the law, while some specimens consist of unfinished stone. In addition to temples, sema could enclose statues of Buddha or sacred mounds.

=== Near East and Africa ===
==== Israel ====
According to B. S. Jackson, stones were put in place in ancient Israel to "mark the boundary of a territory (public or private), and to seek to deter potential violators of that boundary through the use of threats". The Hebrew Bible contains a strict prohibition against the unauthorized displacement or removal of boundary markers.

==== Egypt ====
An example of boundary markers in ancient Egypt were the boundary stelae of Akhenaten. They defined the limits of the sacred city of Akhet-Aten, built by Akhenaten as the center of the Aten religious cult which he founded. Egyptologists categorize the stelae based on whether they are inscribed with the "Earlier Proclamation", a general explanation of why the location was selected and how the city would be designed, or the "Later Proclamation", which provides additional details about the perimeters of the city.

=== Europe ===
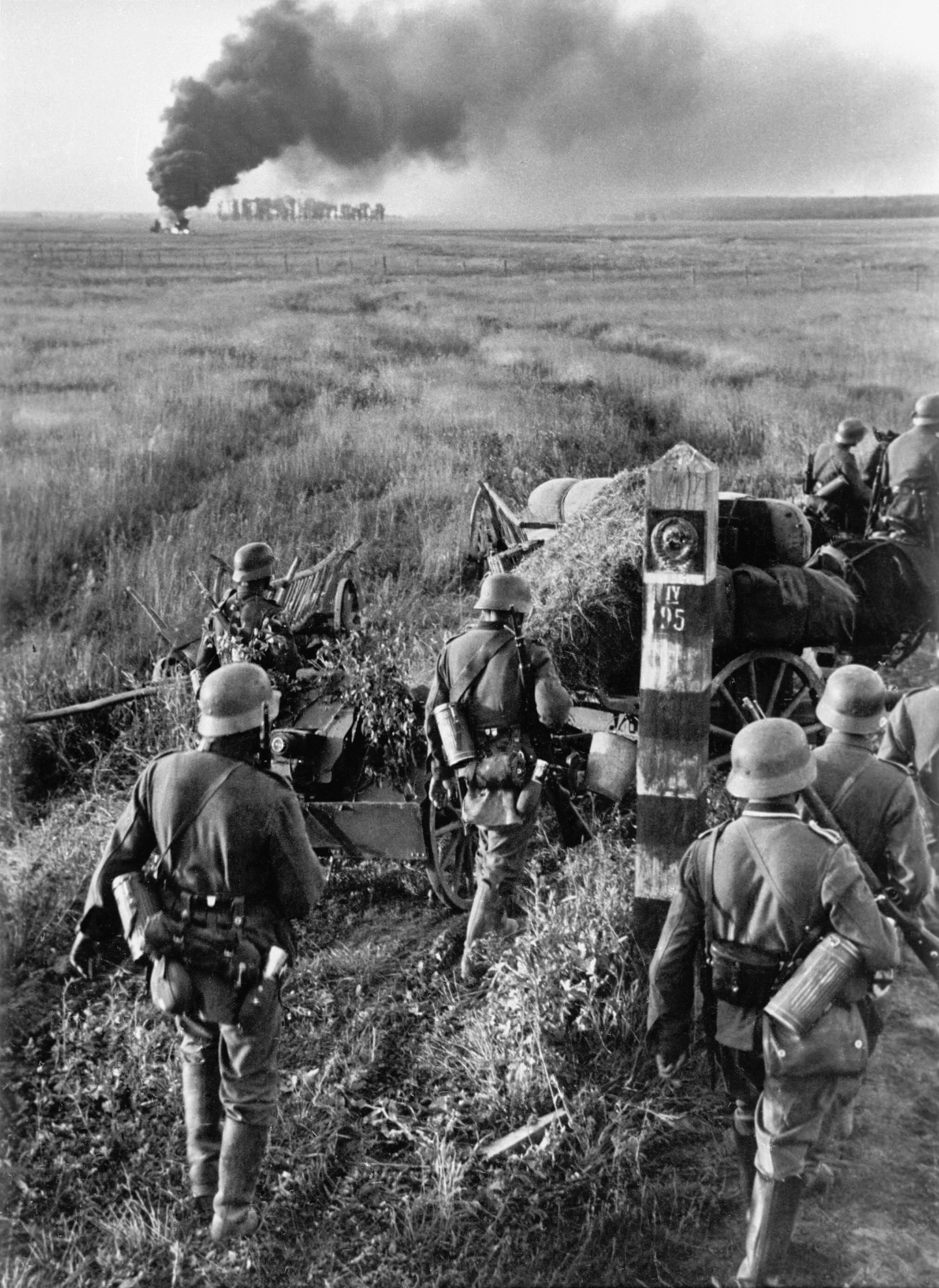
German troops at the Soviet state border marker during Operation Barbarossa, 1941

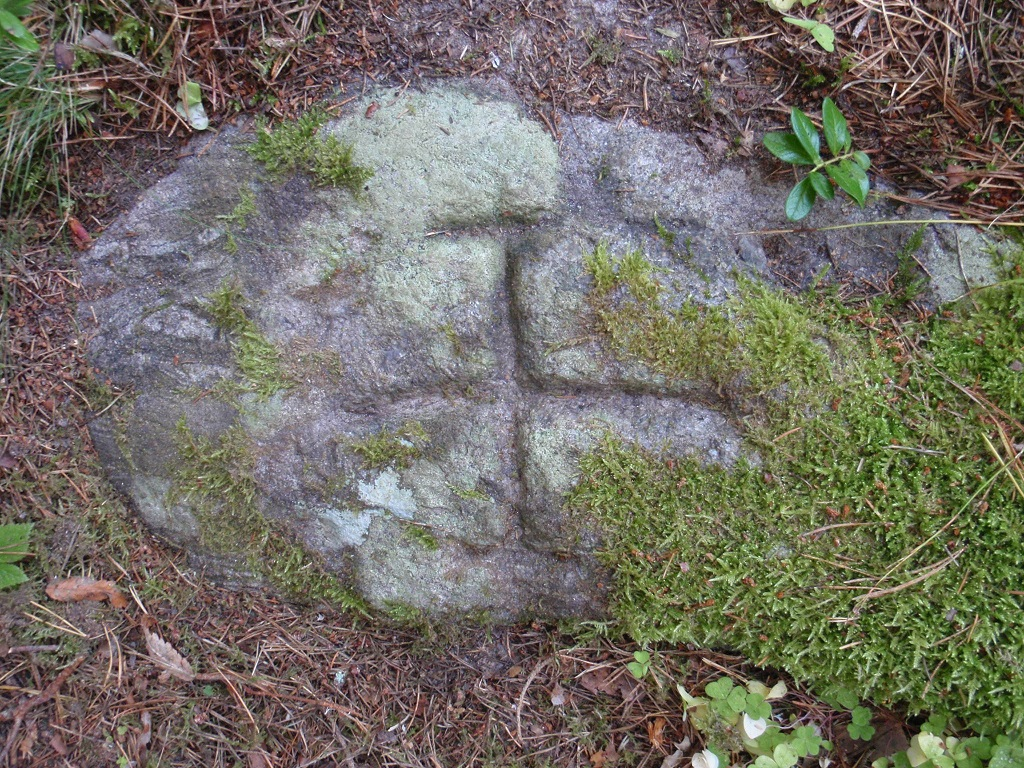
Boundary stone in Estonia

==== Finland ====
Glacial erratics and similar natural stones were often used as boundary markers between properties. Knowledge of their locations was typically maintained by oral tradition, wherein men of each house would walk the length of the border. These stones then became boundary markers for municipalities, and eventually provinces and countries. For example, Kuhankuono is a stone that marks the multipoint border between seven municipalities in Kurjenrahka National Park near Turku. Today, however, steel rods topped with a cube painted orange are usually used. Municipalities often post a traffic sign featuring their coat of arms on the border on major roads. On the Finnish-Russian border, many historical border stones, marked with Swedish and Imperial Russian symbols, are still in use. The actual Finnish-Russian border is marked by small white bollard, but on both sides of the border there are large striped bollards decorated with a coat of arms: a blue/white bollard on the Finnish side, a red/green bollard on the Russian side. Artificial cairns are found on the Norway-Russia-Finland tripoint (Treriksrøysa) and Norway-Sweden-Finland tripoint (Three-Country Cairn). The Sweden-Finland border on Märket is marked with holes drilled to the rock, because seasonal pack ice can shear off any protruding markers. In folklore, a type of haltija, rajahaltija, a kind of a local spirit, was believed to haunt borders that had been unjustly moved.

==== Germany ====
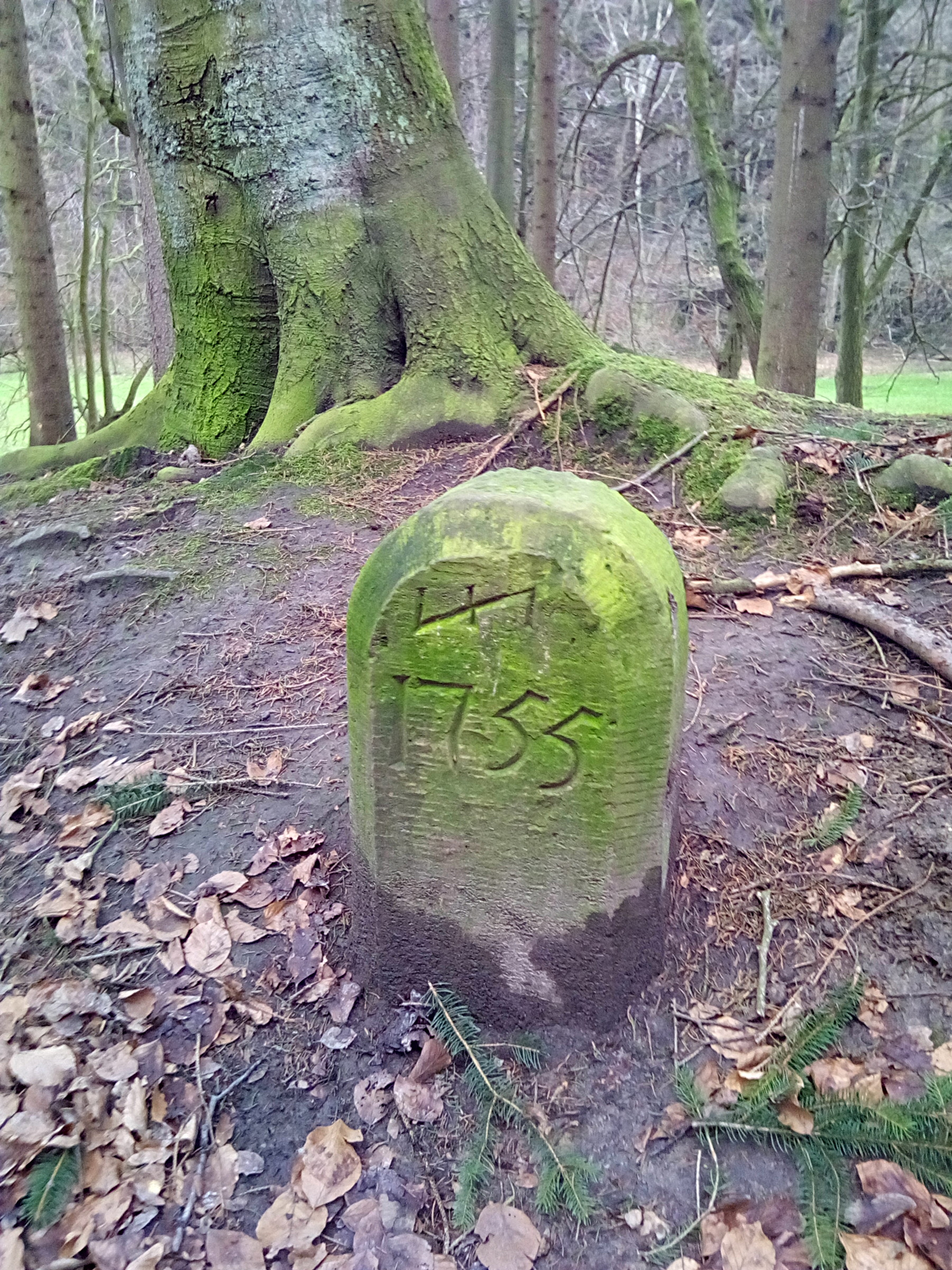
Wolfsangel on a 1755 boundary marker near the wood of Barsinghausen

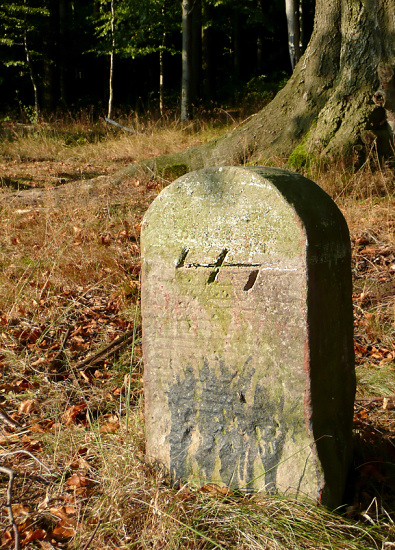
The Wolfsangel on an old field boundary stone in the Deister in Lower Saxony

The Dreieckiger Pfahl is a granite pillar that once marked the border between the Kingdom of Hanover and the Duchy of Brunswick. The Wolfsangel in its horizontal form was used as a boundary marker in forests, and has been recorded as early as 1616 in a boundary treaty concluded between Hesse and the Duchy of Brunswick-Lüneburg

==== Greece ====
The earliest reference to a boundary stone in Greek literature is in the Iliad, which describes the goddess Athena using one as a projectile. Boundary stones, known as horos, could be made of either carved or undressed stones, and were typically inscribed with the Greek word horos. One such stone was used to indicate the edge of the Athenian agora. The practice of separating areas of land with boundary stones, though common, was widely considered by classical writers to be a violation of the principle of communal land ownership.

==== Rome ====
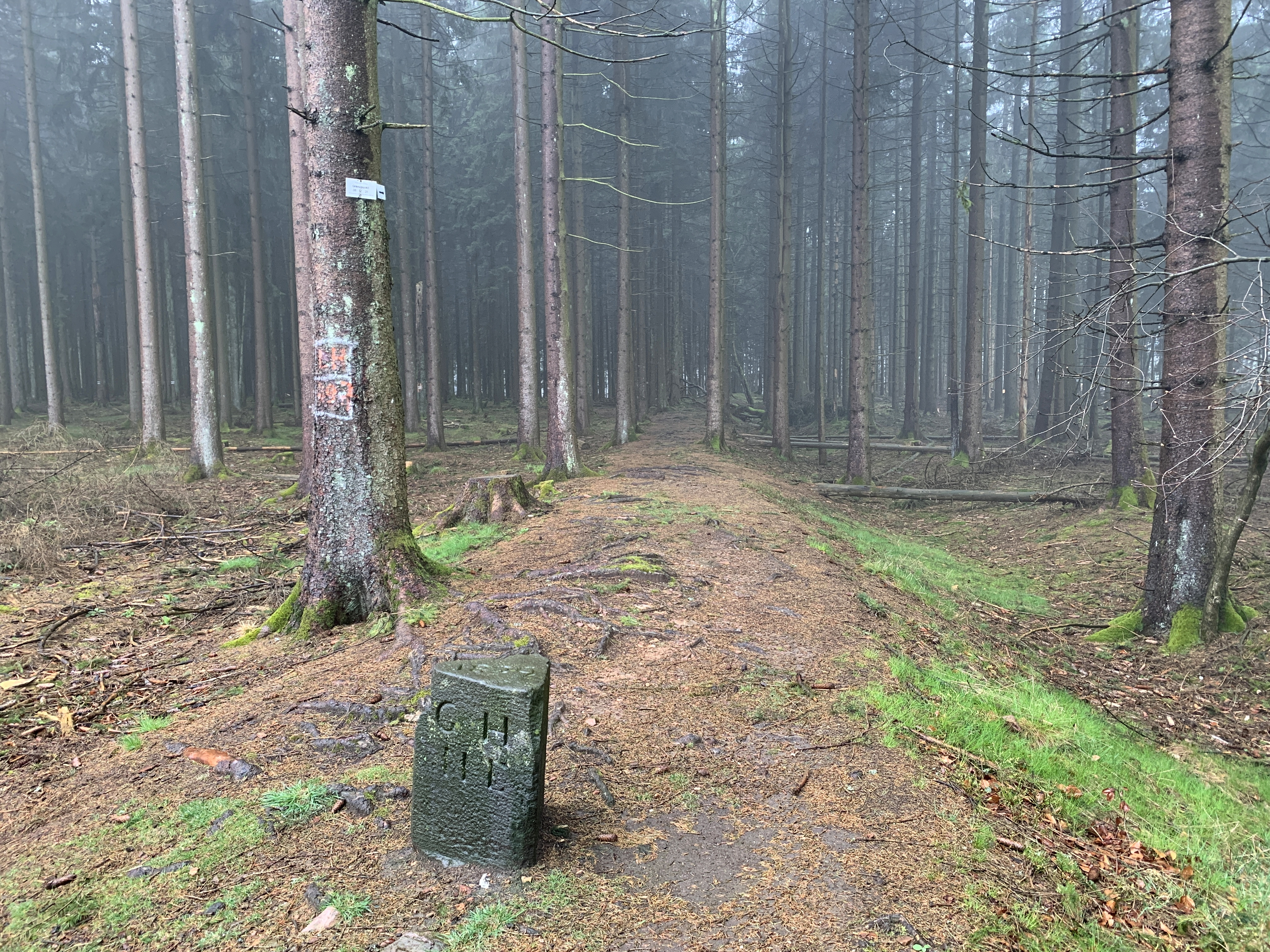
Old boundary stone on the Limes border wall of the Roman Empire

In ancient Roman religion, the god Terminus was worshiped as the patron god of boundary markers. Ovid, in a hymn directed to the god, wrote: "O Terminus, whether thou art a stone or a stump buried in the field, … thou dost set bounds to people and cities and vast kingdoms". Numa Pompillius made the first Roman law requiring boundary stones around private property and instituting capital punishment for anyone found guilty of moving these stones.

==== Monaco ====
In 1828, the Principality of Monaco and the Kingdom of Piedmont-Sardinia established a physical border with 91 boundary stones, each numbered 1 to 91, running along the border from present-day Fontvieille to Menton-Garavan. Prior to 1848, the Principality of Monaco included the villages of Roquebrune, Monti, Garavan and Menton. Of the original 91 boundary stones only 12 remain: 6 within the Principality of Monaco, 3 in Roquebrune-Cap-Martin, and 3 in Menton. The boundary stones numbered 9, 12, 15, and 31 are located in Monaco. Another stone has been cast in concrete in the Sainte-Cécile area of Monaco thus rendering its number illegible. Stone number 55, originally located in Roquebrune, was given as a gift from the city of Roquebrune to the Principality of Monaco and is now located in Monaco's city hall. Stones numbered 56, 57, and 58 are located in Roquebrune. Stones numbered 62, 71, and 73 are located in Menton. All the boundary stones have three engraved sides: one side with their individual numbers (1 to 91), one side with the letter "M" indicating Monaco's territory, and one side with a cross (+) indicating the Kingdom of Piedmont-Sardinia's territory. The cross represents the coat of arms of the House of Savoy, rulers of Piedmont-Sardinia.

=== Western Australia ===
The history of marking the Western Australian border on the ground states that the "Austral Pillar" and the "Deakin Pillar" are points used to determine their position east of Greenwich and then fix a border from, in this case used to determine the line of the 129th meridian east longitude, as the Western Australian border. The Deakin Obelisk and the Kimberley Obelisk in Australia are used in a slightly different way, in that a line is run north and south through a point on the obelisks, formed by a copper plug embedded into the top centre of the concrete obelisks. The "corners" in Australia, such as Cameron Corner, Haddon Corner, Poeppel Corner, and Surveyor Generals Corner, are where multiple borders meet or a border changes direction.

=== United States ===
==== Hawaii ====
The basic unit of the ancient Hawaiian land division system was the ahupua'a, a self-sustaining agricultural district. The places where a road crossed the border of an ahupua'a were marked with distinctive altars, known as ahu or (stone) piles. These altars served not only as boundary markers but also as sites for the performance of religious rituals related to land taxation. C. J. Lyons, an early surveyor of Hawaii, recorded that "[u]pon this altar at the annual progress of the akua makahiki (year god) was deposited the tax paid by the land whose boundary it marked, and also an image of a hog, puaa, carved out of kukui wood and stained with red ochre. … [F]rom this came the name, ahupuaa“. Naturally occurring landscape features were also used as points of reference for district borders.

==== Washington, D.C. ====
The original boundaries of the District of Columbia were marked using boundary stones. These were made of saw-cut sandstone blocks and stood two feet high when set in the ground. Ten boundary stones were placed along each side of the 100 square miles (260 square kilometers) district of Columbia. Although the original surveyors intended each side to be ten miles (16 kilometers) long, their measurements were often inaccurate, resulting in the sometimes significant misplacement of stones and the overall skewing of the District boundaries. Some of these discrepancies are intentional, because the ground at the exact mile point was covered in water; "in such cases", Andrew Ellicott, the leader of the surveying crew, noted in 1793, "the stones are placed on the nearest firm ground and the true distance in miles and poles is marked on them".

Information engraved on the stones includes the number (1 through 10) of the stone within the sequence on that side of the District, the date of placement, and the words "Jurisdiction of the United States". In the twentieth century, the Daughters of the American Revolution voluntarily took responsibility for preserving the stones, which had fallen victim to vandalization and urban development. In the late 1990s renewed interest in the boundary stones led to increased preservation efforts by the DAR and other organizations.

==== Other states ====
In 1773, a Franciscan friar named Francisco Palou erected the first boundary marker between Alta and Baja California. Commissioned by the Spanish Crown, it consisted of a cross made from alder wood and placed standing upright on a rock. In the British colonies, milestones were shipped from England to mark the Mason–Dixon line. A block cut from sandstone was placed at the intersection of Wyoming, Colorado and Utah in 1879, and stone posts were used along the western border of South Dakota. Boundaries were occasionally resurveyed and boundary stones replaced or restored, depending on their condition.

== Gallery ==
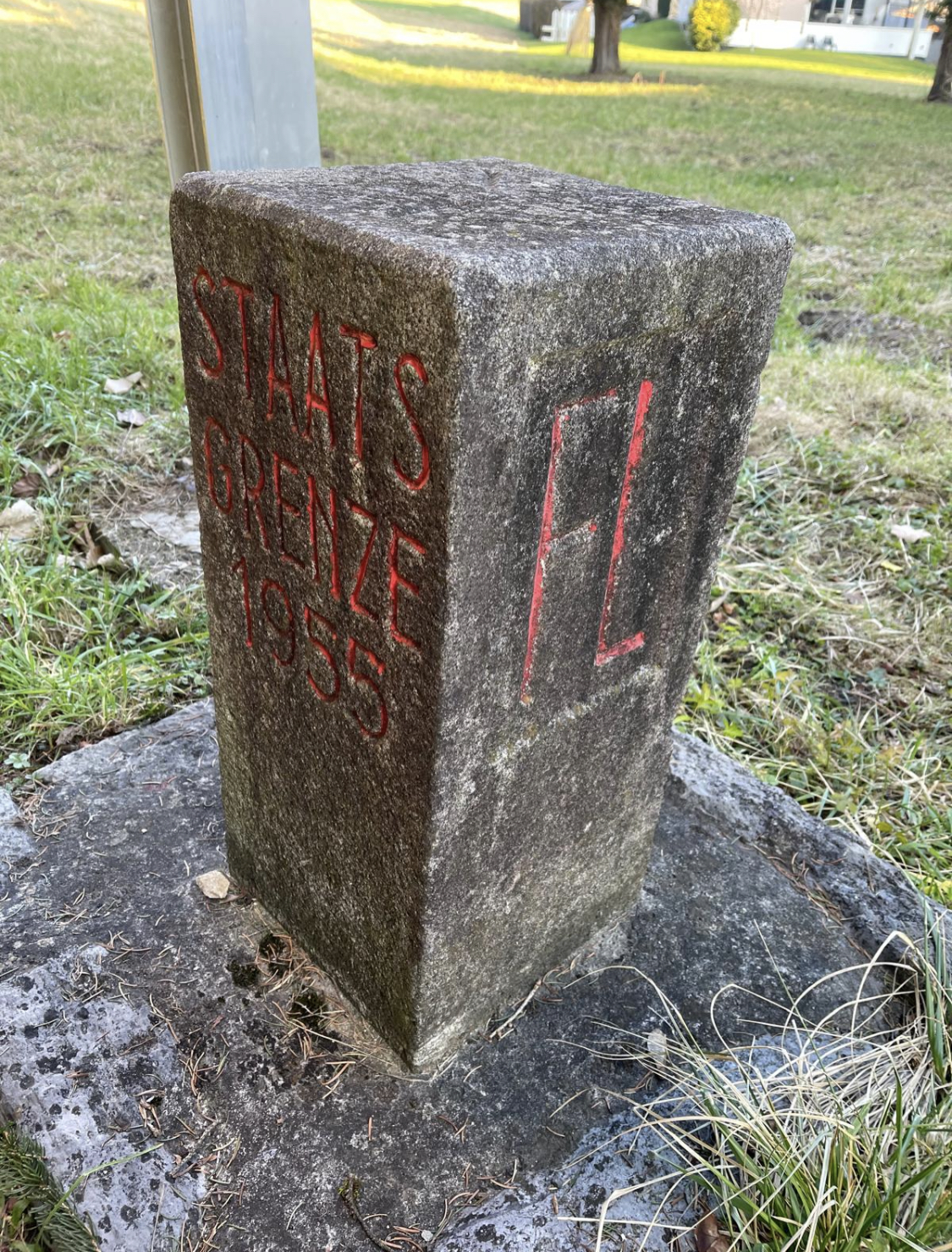
International boundary stone from 1955 on the border between the towns of Feldkirch, Austria and Mauren, Liechtenstein

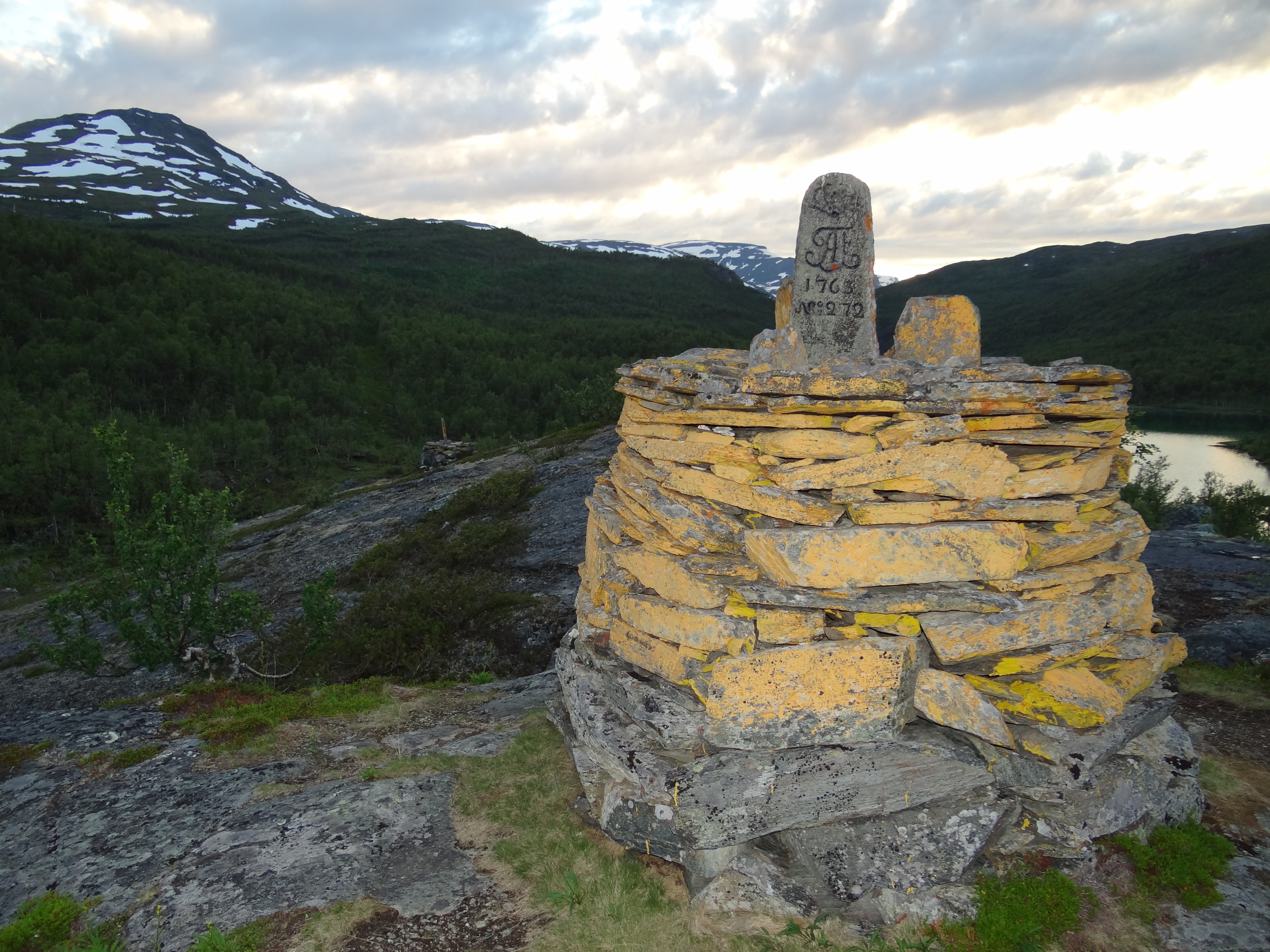
Border stone from 1763 between Norway and Sweden, located in the Arctic

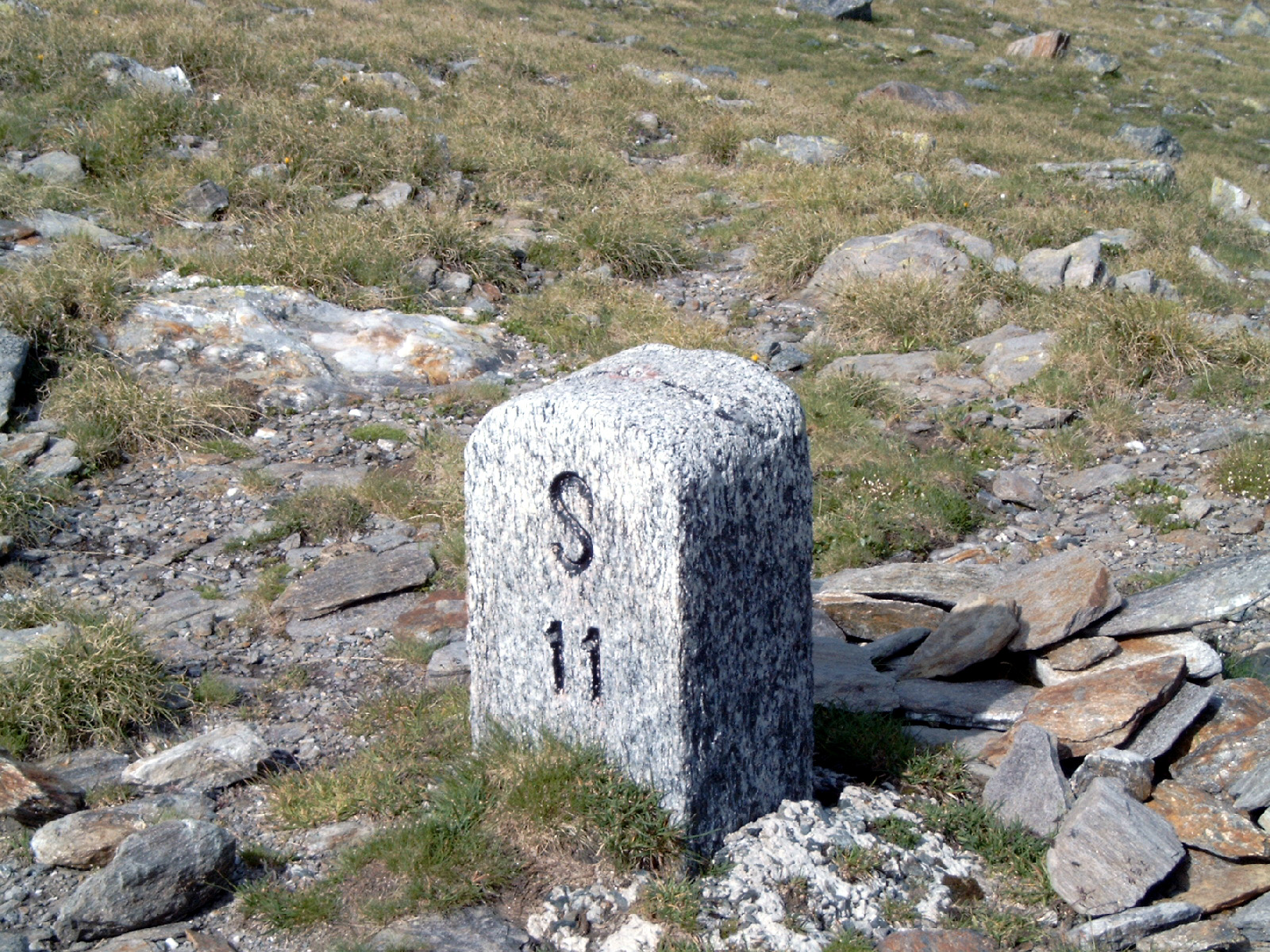
Border stone at Passo San Giacomo between Val Formazza in Italy and Val Bedretto in Switzerland

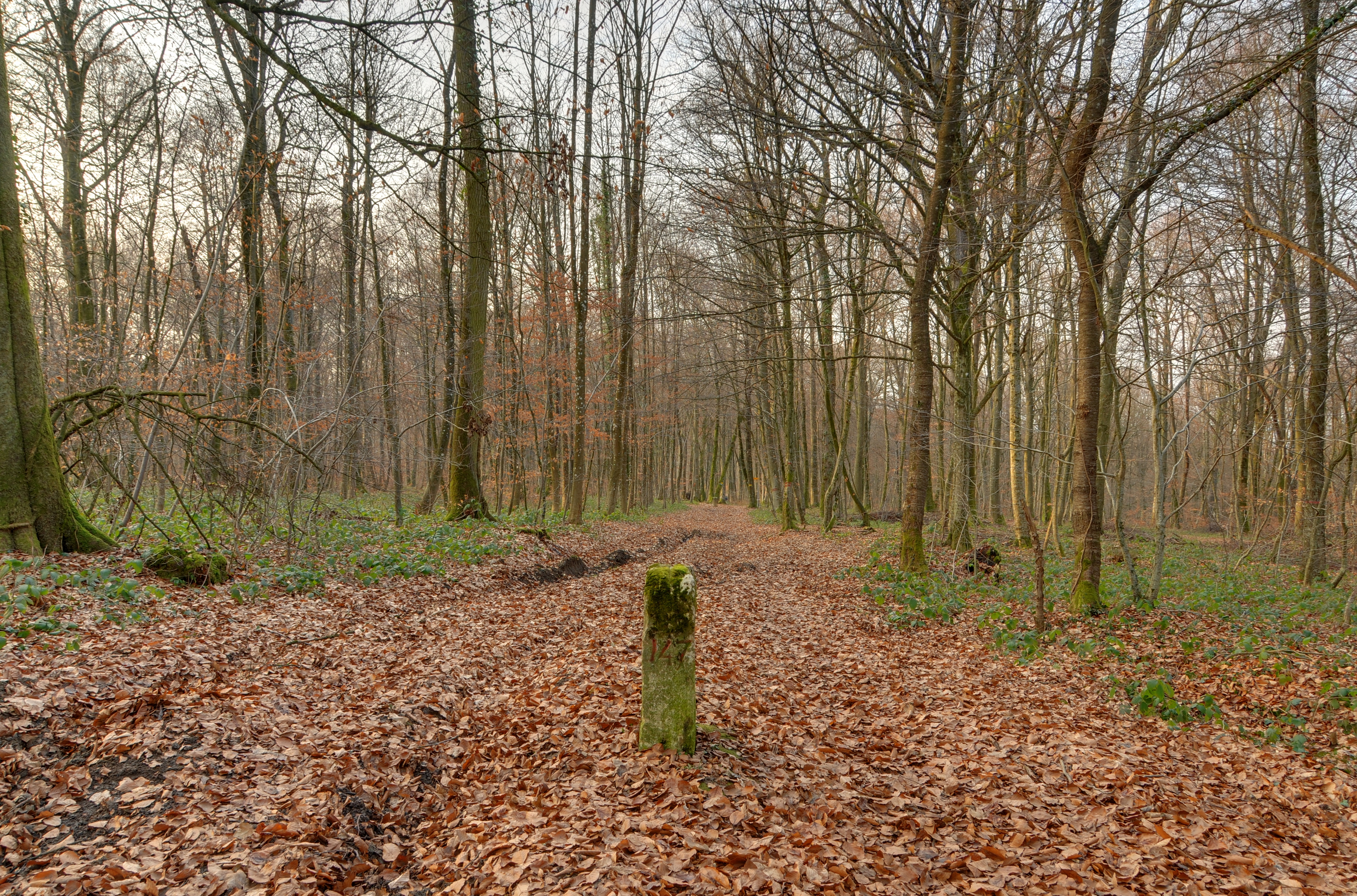
French-Swiss border boundary marker.

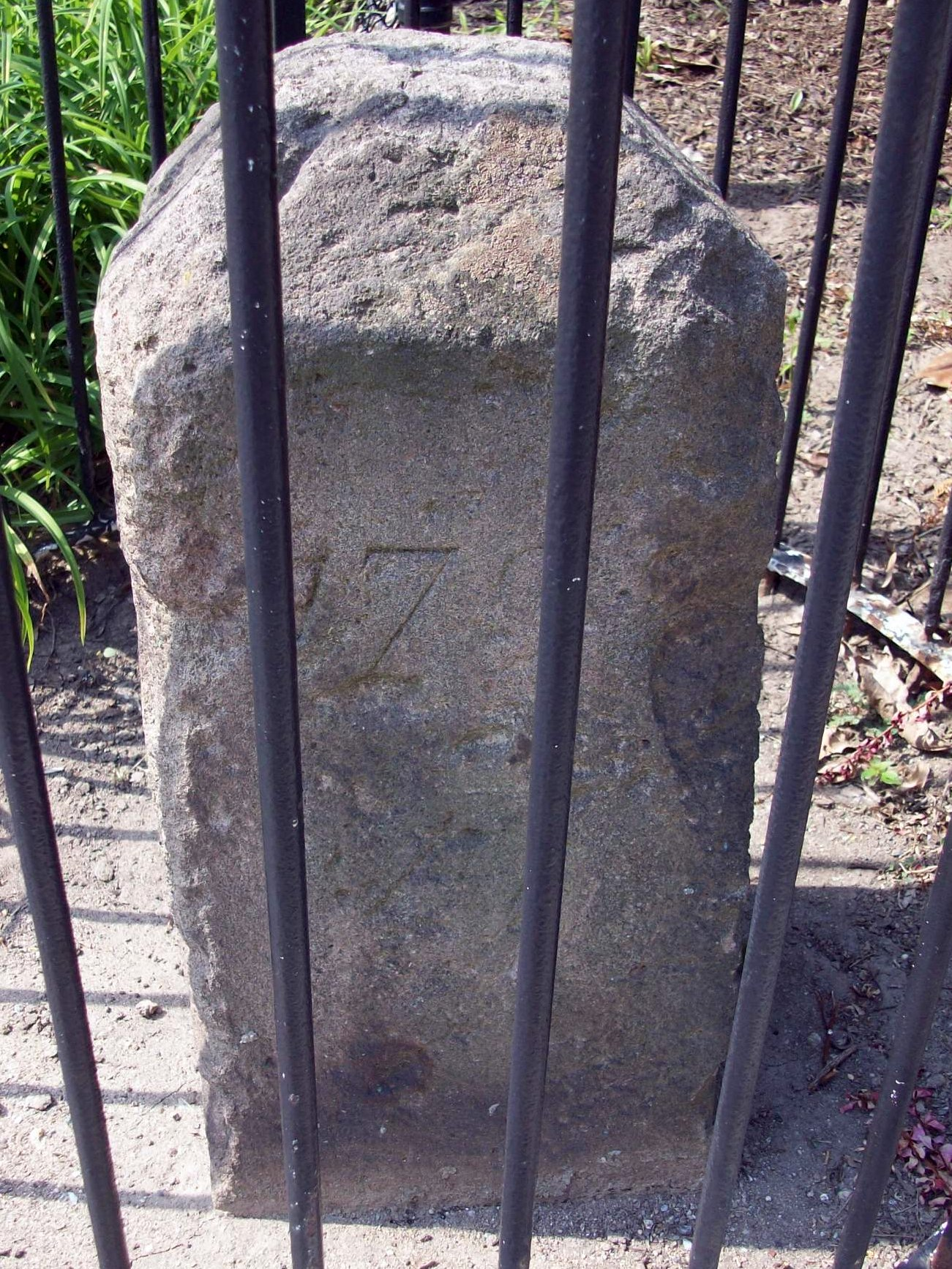
Boundary stone of the original District of Columbia set in 1792 marking the boundary between Washington, D.C., and Maryland in the United States.

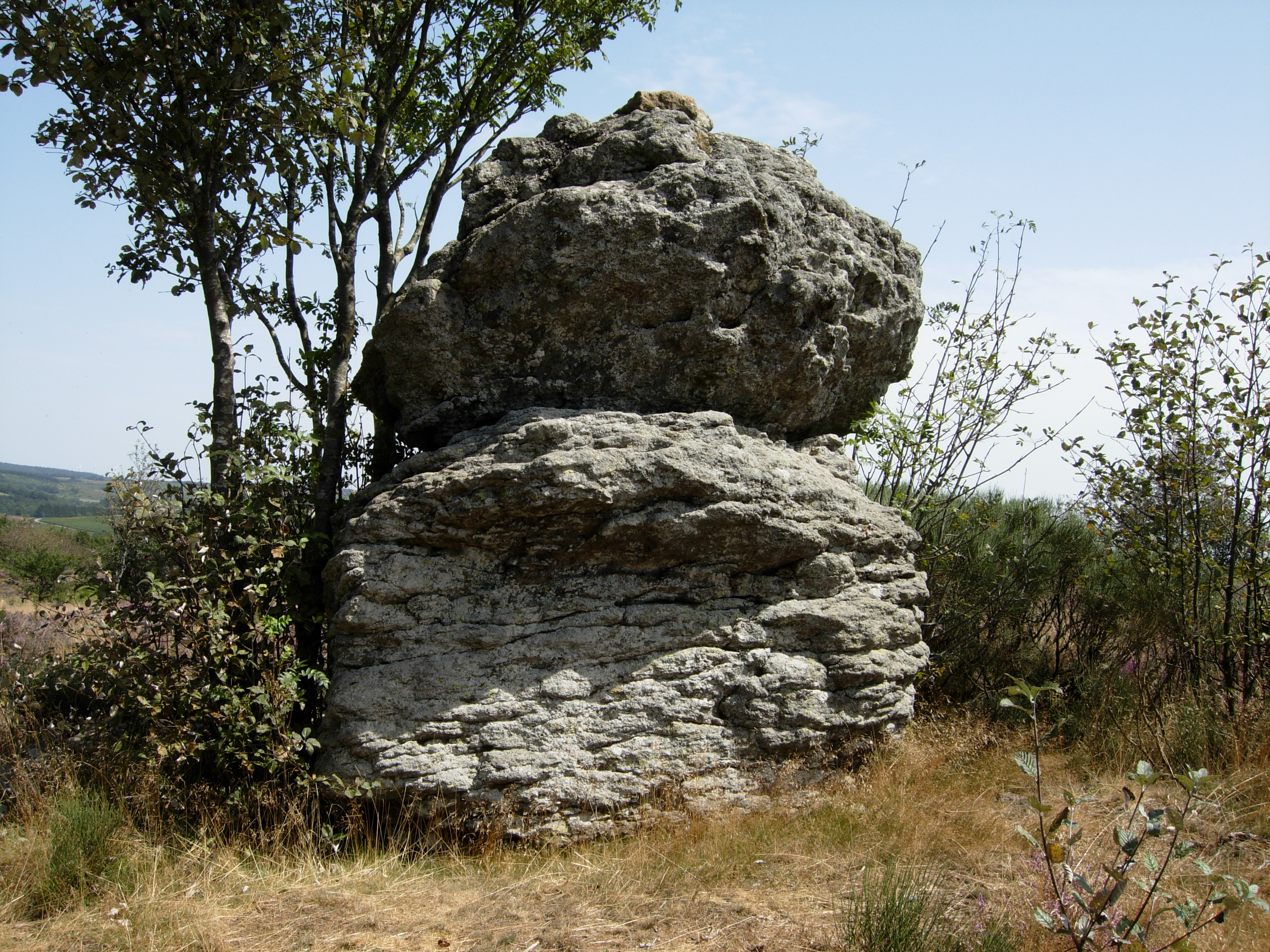
Border stone in France between the communes of Nages, Murat-sur-Vèbre and Fraisse-sur-Agout

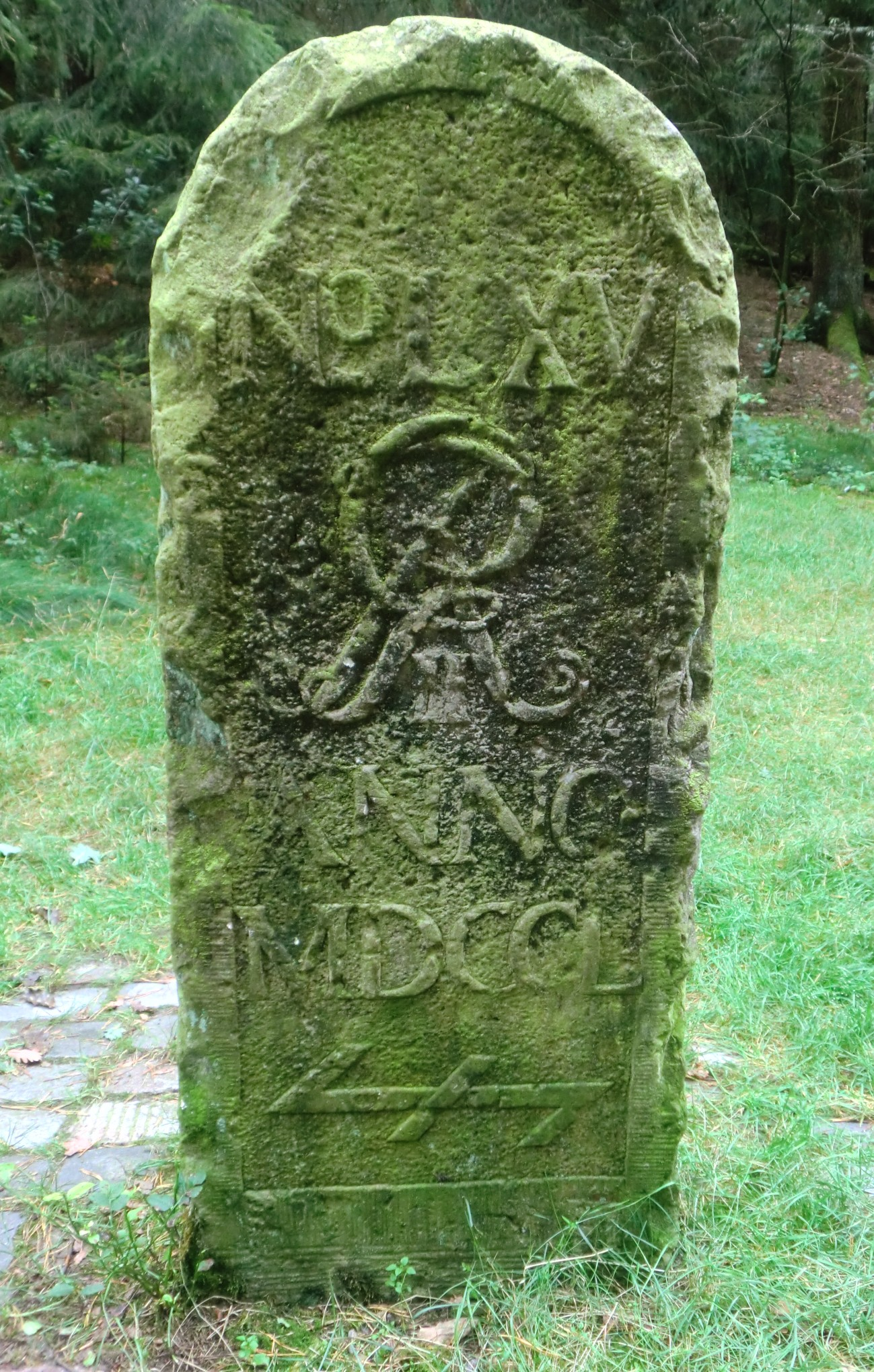
German forest boundary stone from 1754; it marks one end of a line of 65 boundary stones between the Hanoverian state forest and the woods held in common by local villages. The border was marked by order of George II of Great Britain who was also Elector of Hanover at that time.

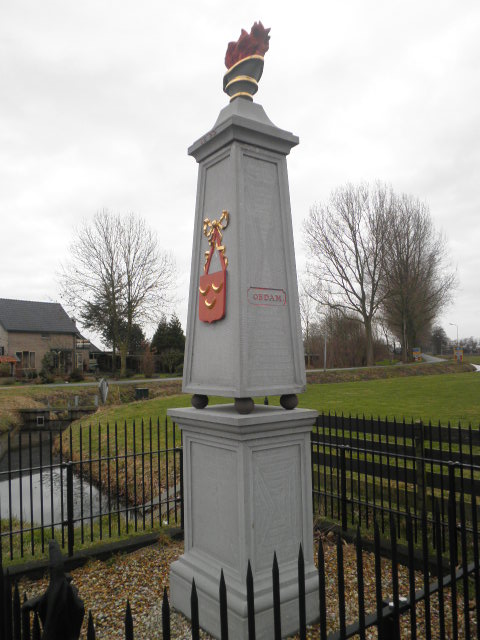
A boundary marker in Obdam, the Netherlands. It marks the boundary between Obdam and Hensbroek.

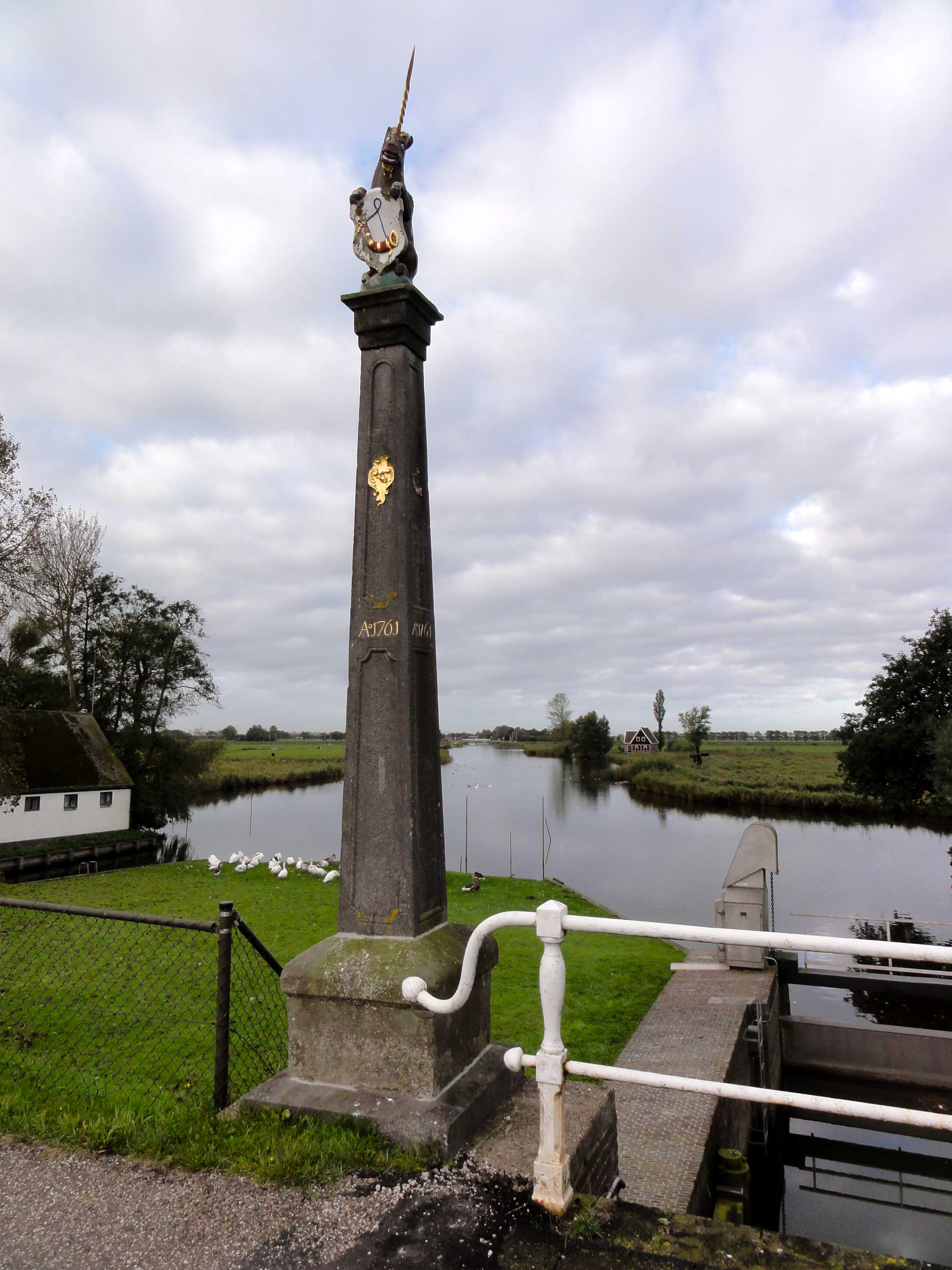
Boundary marker (also banishing pole) in Schardam, the Netherlands, showing the coat of arms of Hoorn.

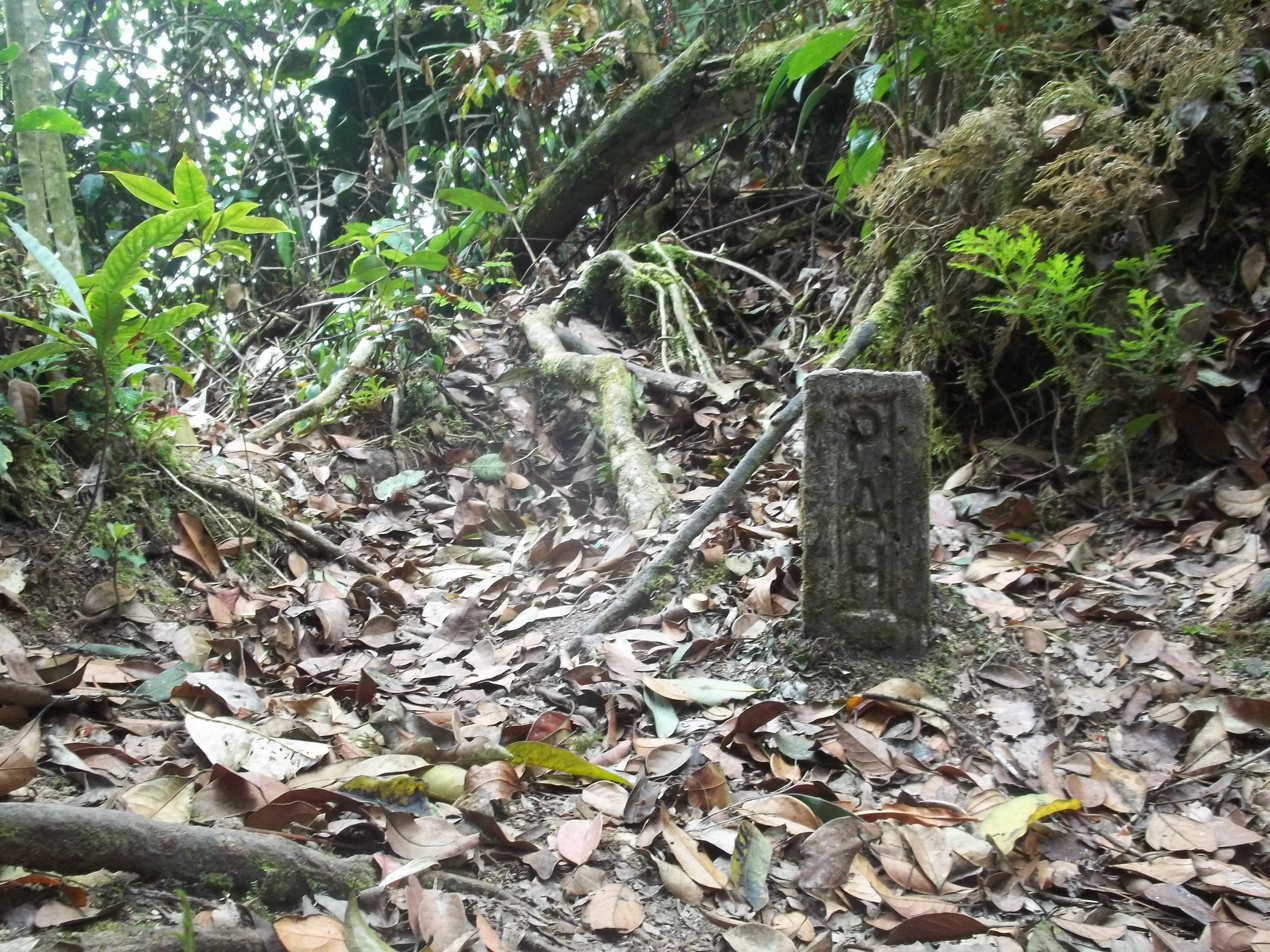
Border stone in Mount Nuang hiking track. Marks the boundary between Selangor and Pahang, Malaysia.

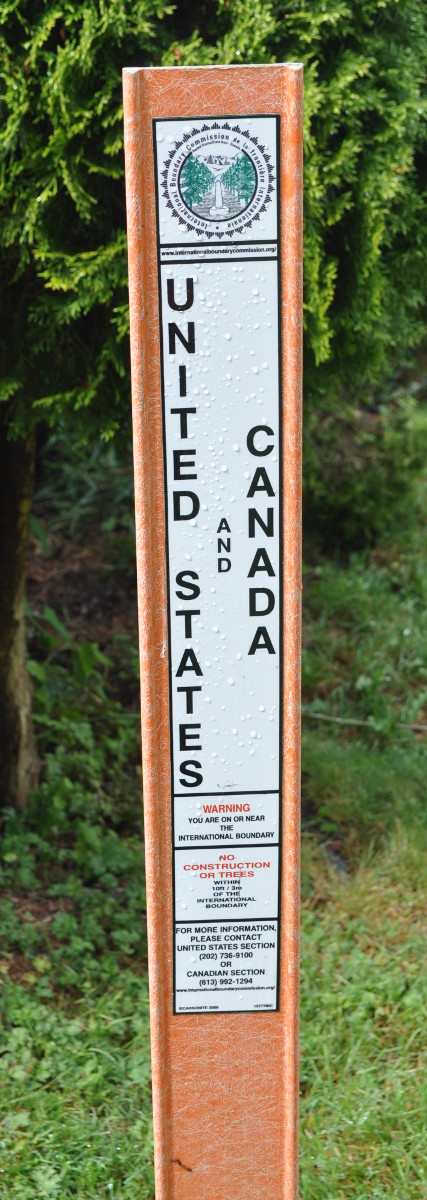
Modern boundary marker on the 49th parallel north designating the border between the United States and Canada.

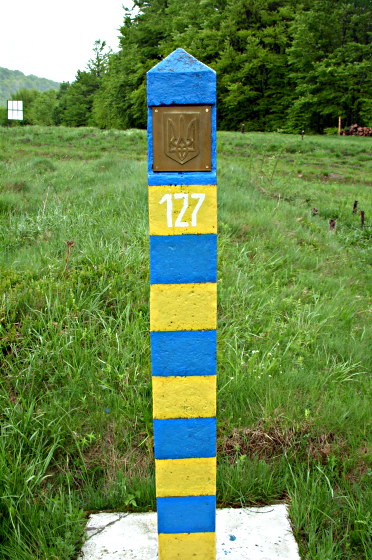
Typical border marker of Ukraine.

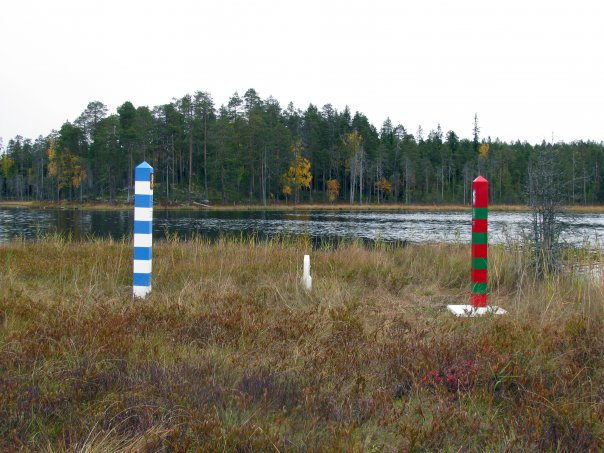
Finland–Russia border markers: a white marker for the actual border, "guarded" by striped bollards

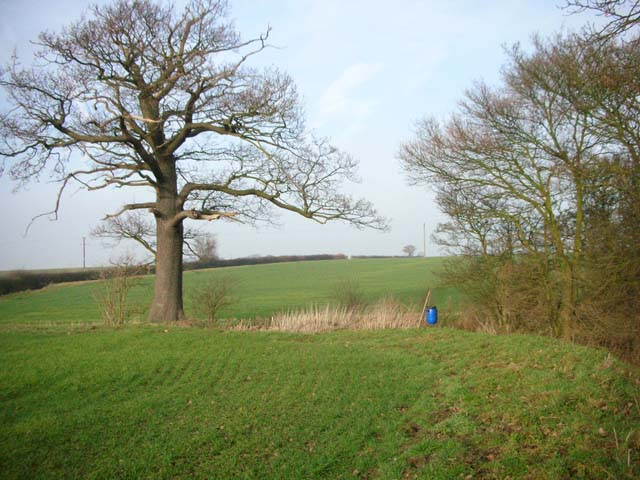
Parish Boundary Tree. The tree stands on the boundary between Clopton and Lilford-cum-Wigsthorpe.

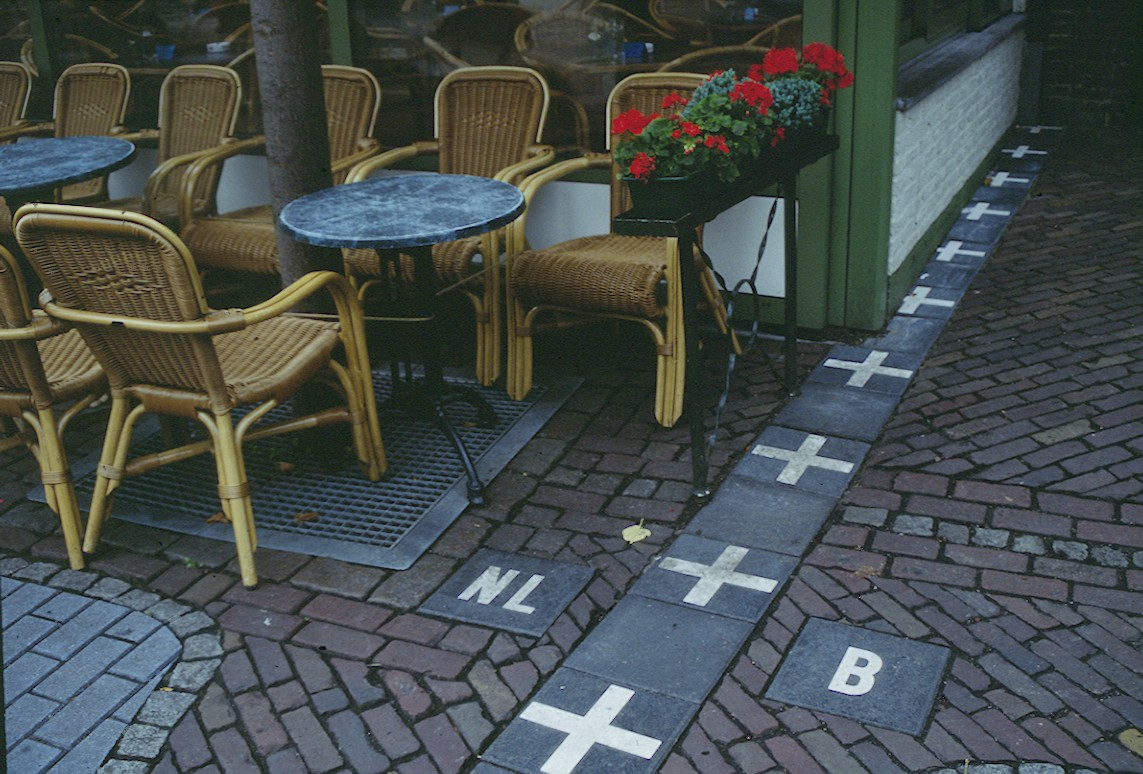
The border of Baarle-Hertog (Belgium) and Baarle-Nassau (Netherlands). Note the precision of the location of the Dutch café.

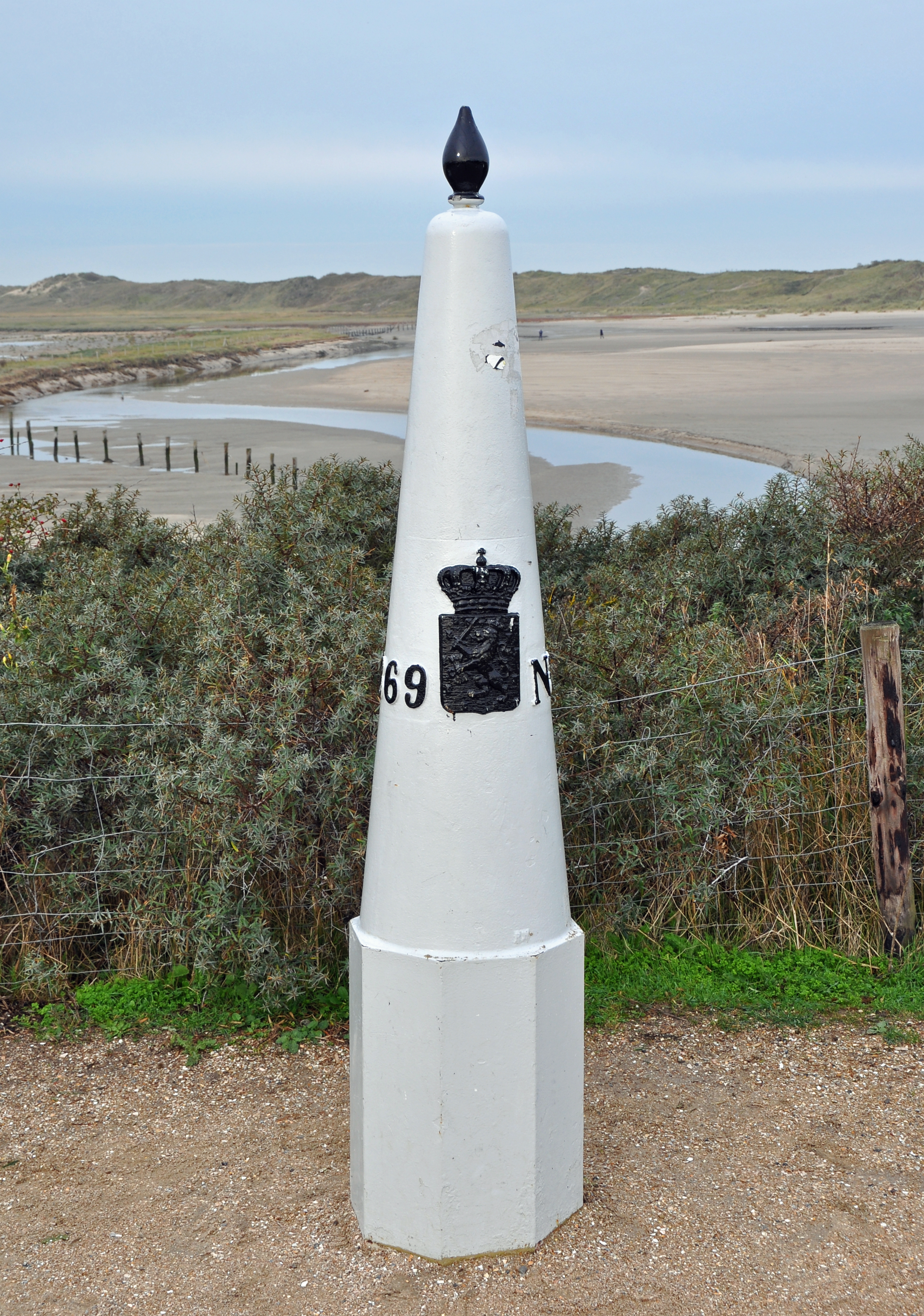
Boundary marker between Belgium and The Netherlands at Cadzand-Bad.

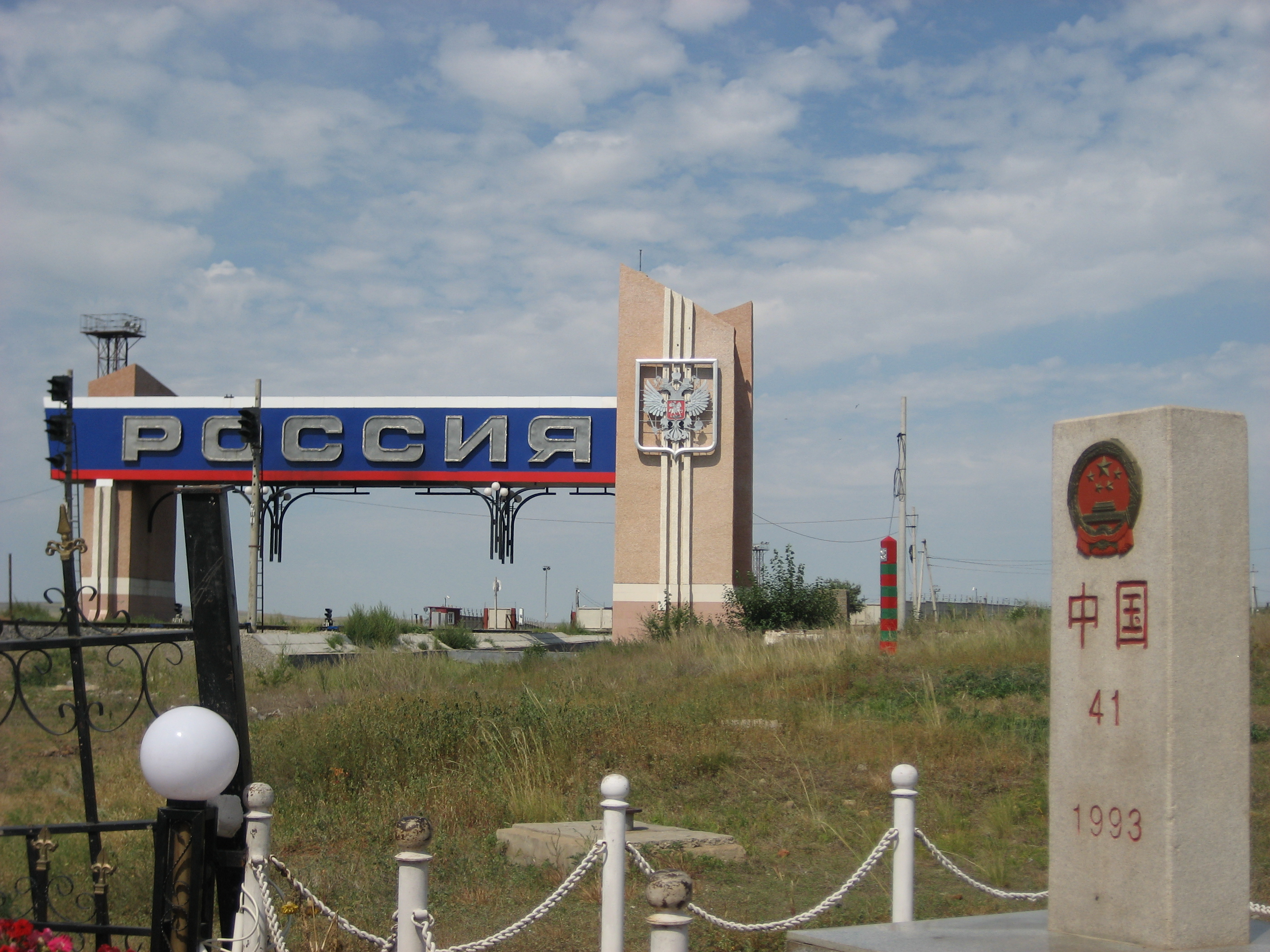
Border stone in China, foreground right, with Russian border marker to its left in background, striped red and green. The large gate is entirely in Russian territory.

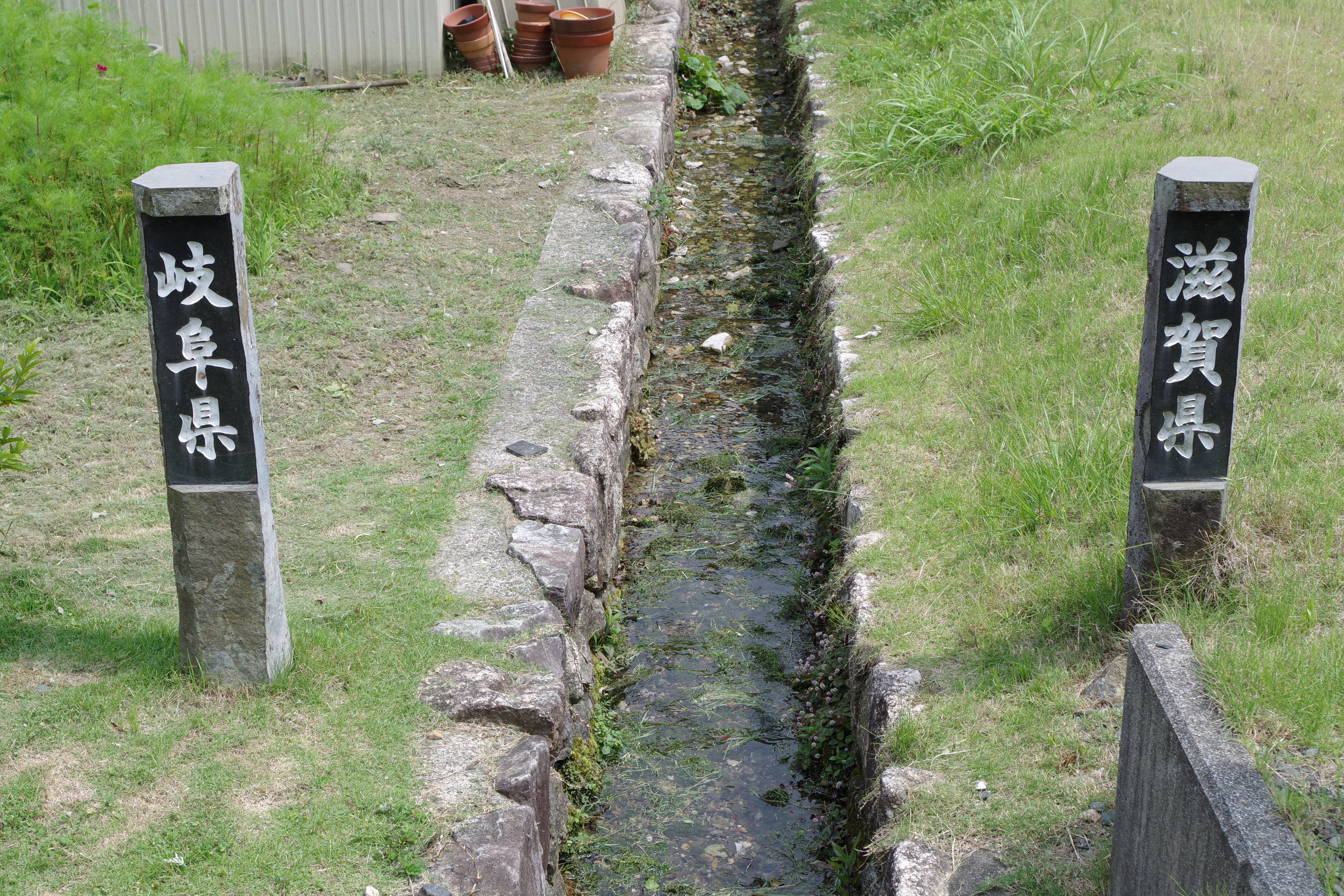
Border stones in Japan, marking Gifu (left) and Shiga (right) prefectures

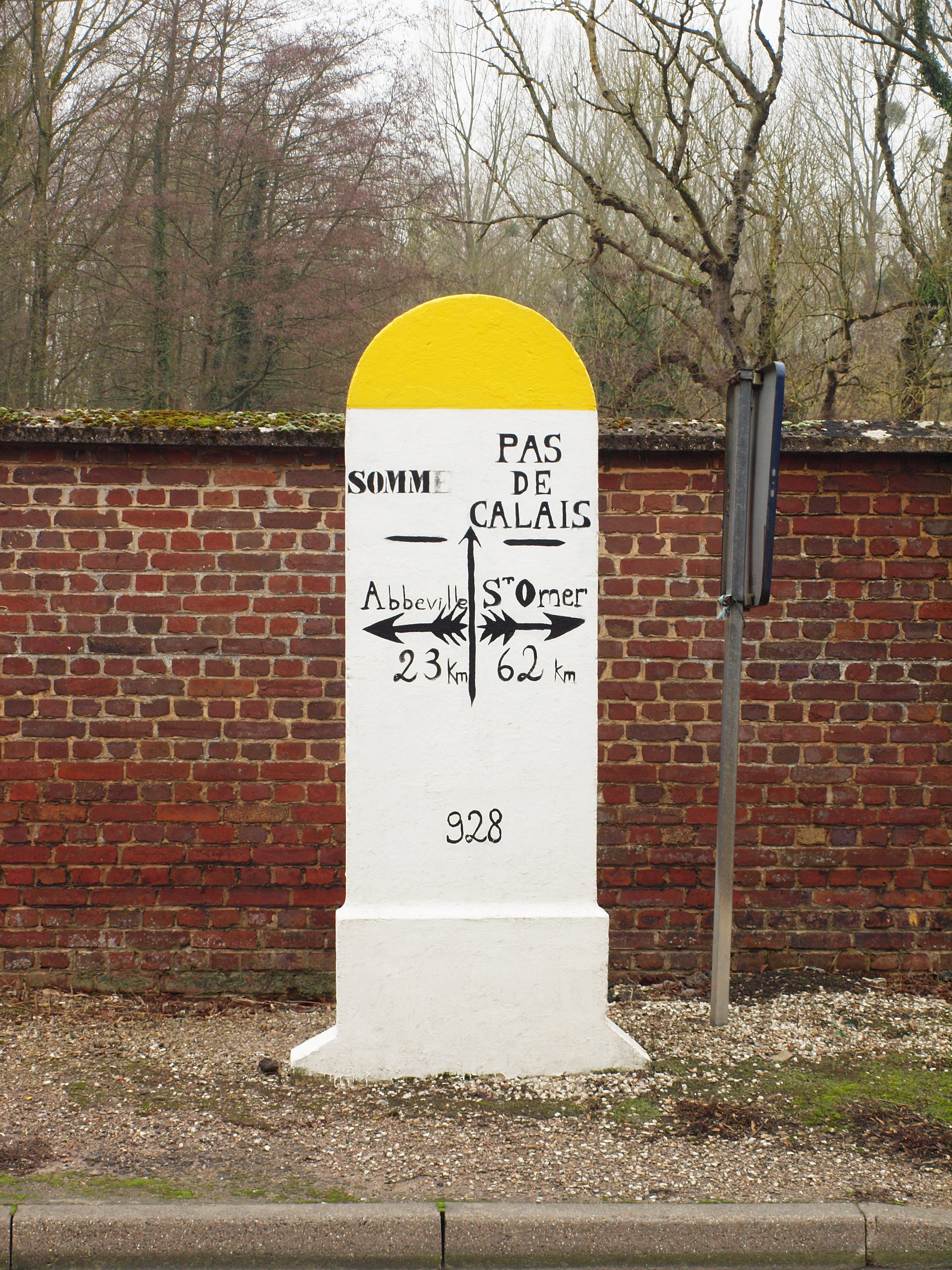
Milestone in France, doubling as a border marker between départements

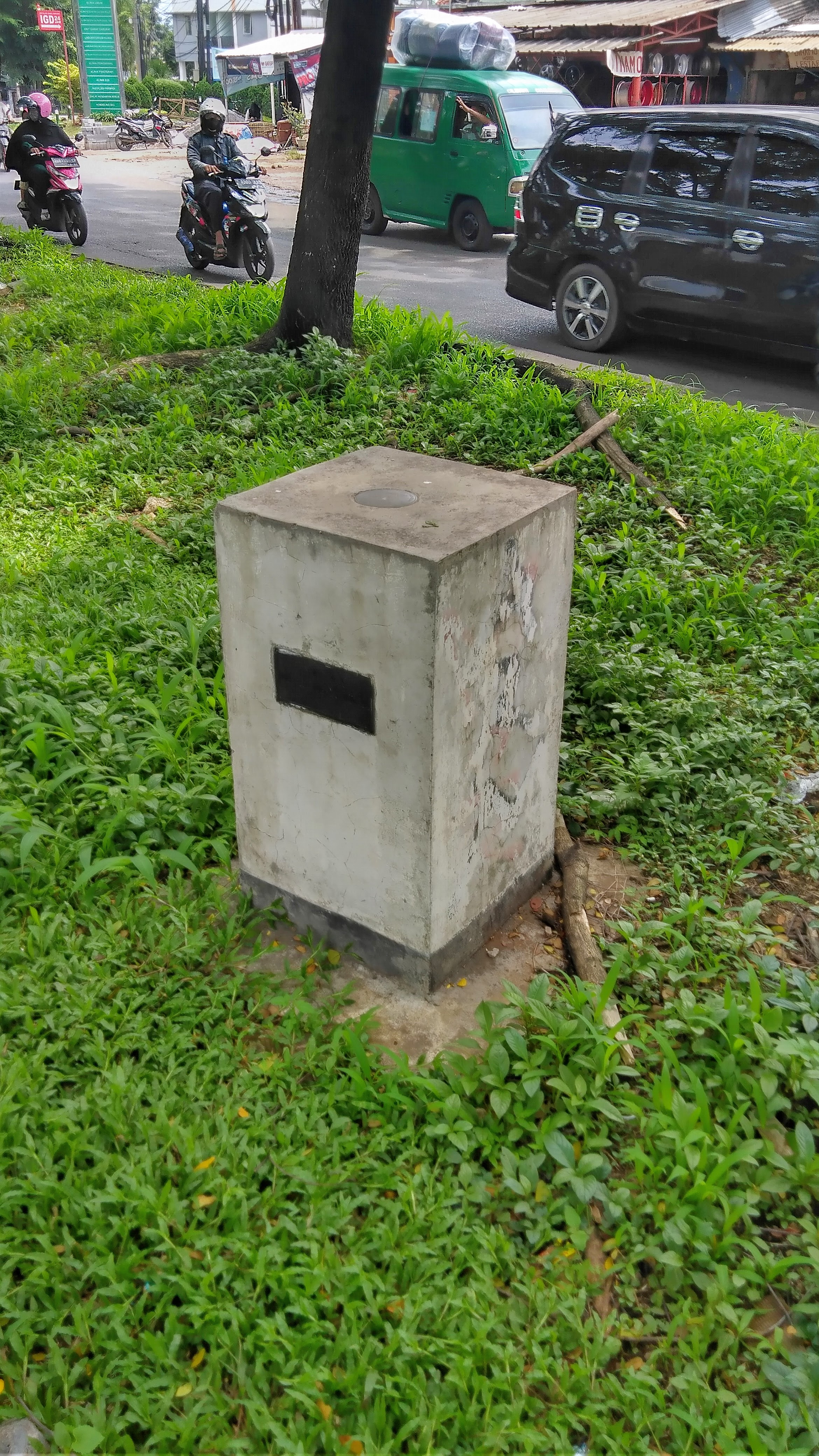
City boundary marker between Sumedang Regency and Bandung Regency, located in Indonesia. Photo was taken from Sumedang side.

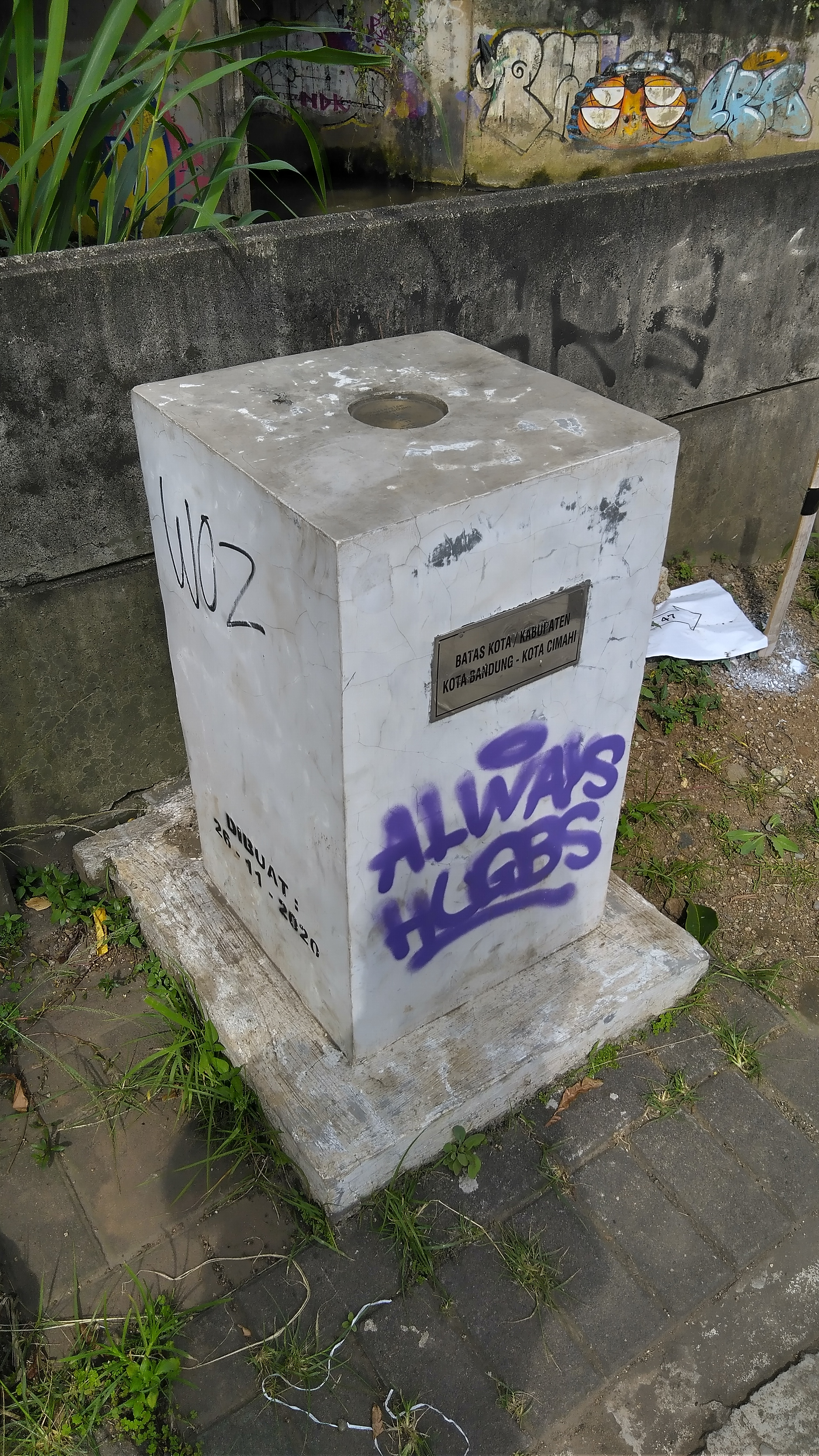
City boundary marker between Bandung City and Cimahi City, Indonesia, as a result of former's enlargement by the government regulation changes in 1987. Photo was taken from Bandung side.

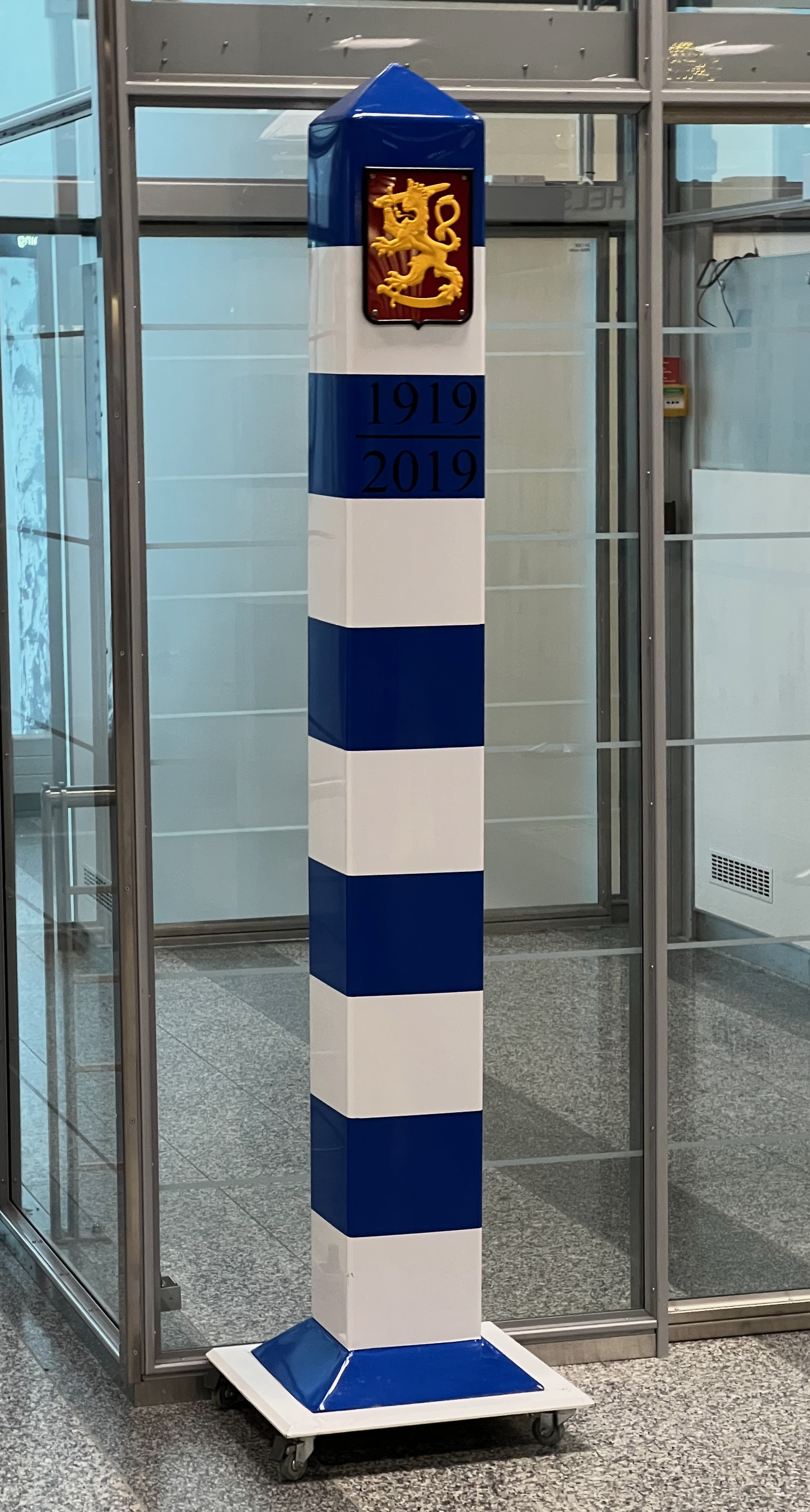
Symbolic Finnish border marker on casters in the immigration hall of Helsinki-Vantaa Airport.

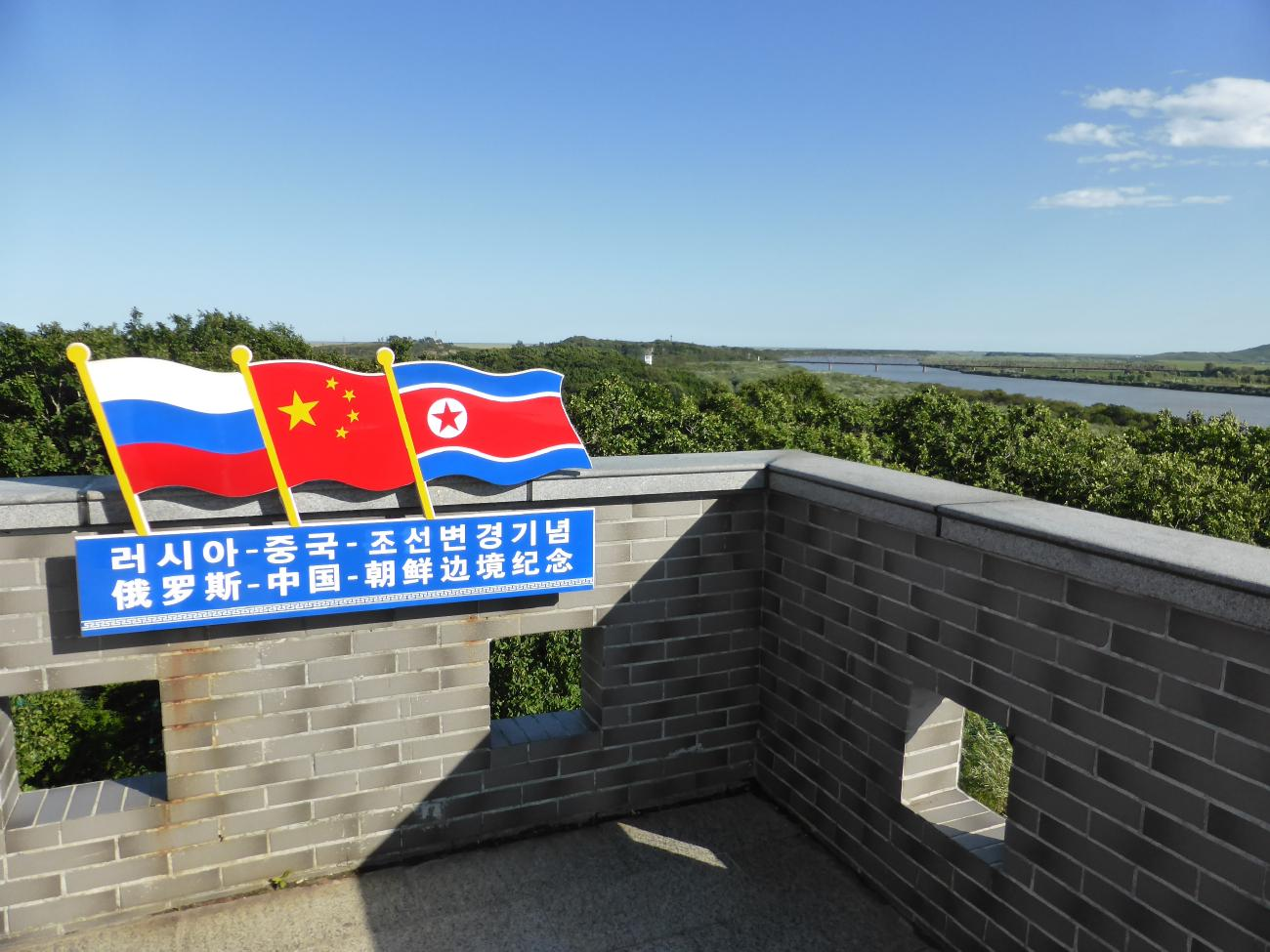
A triangulation station in Fangchuan, China, one of three set by treaty, the actual China–North Korea–Russia tripoint being riverine.

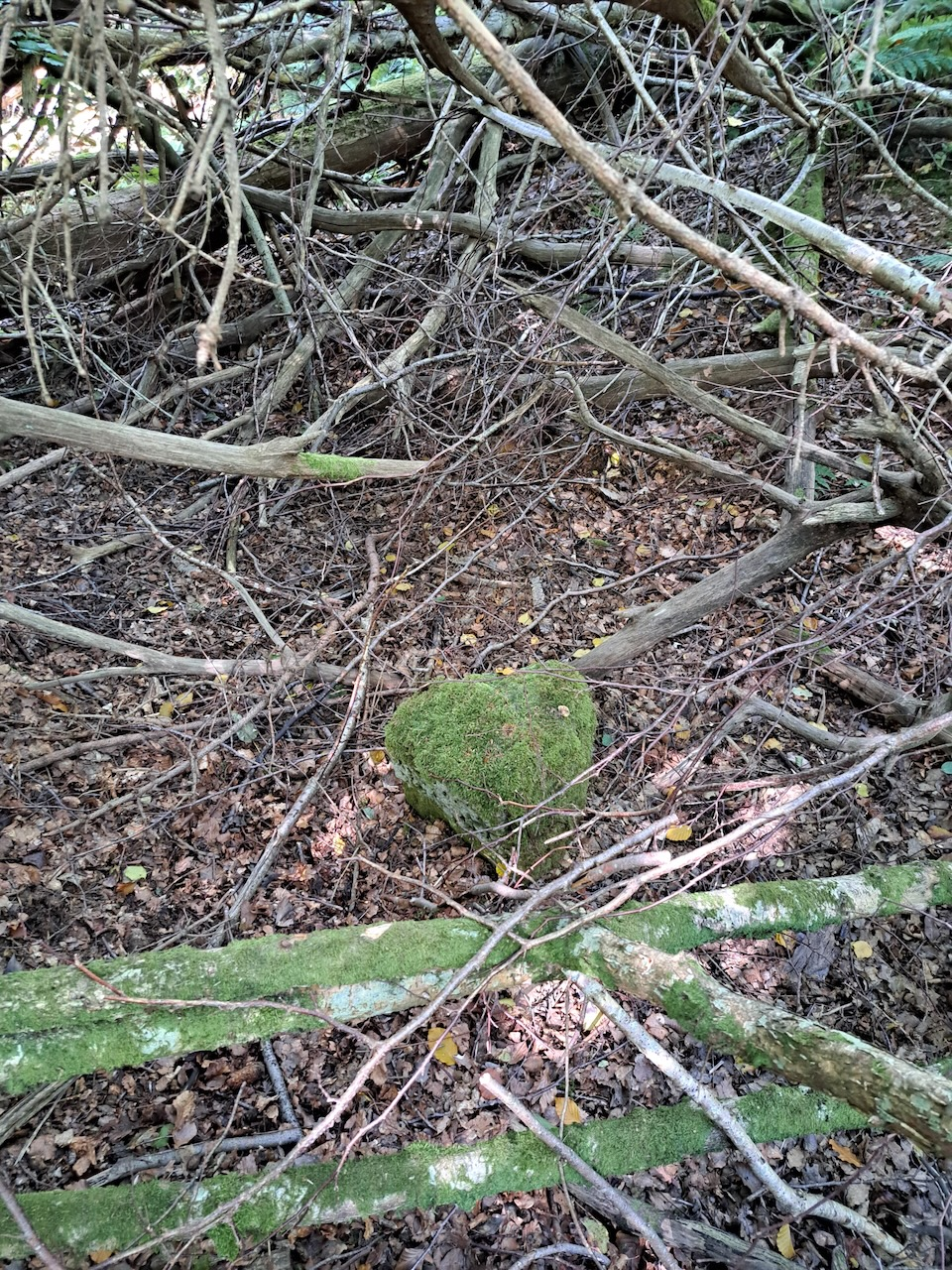
Gunters Stone, a possibly 14th century marker between Hampshire and Sussex, England, in Southleigh Forest near Havant.

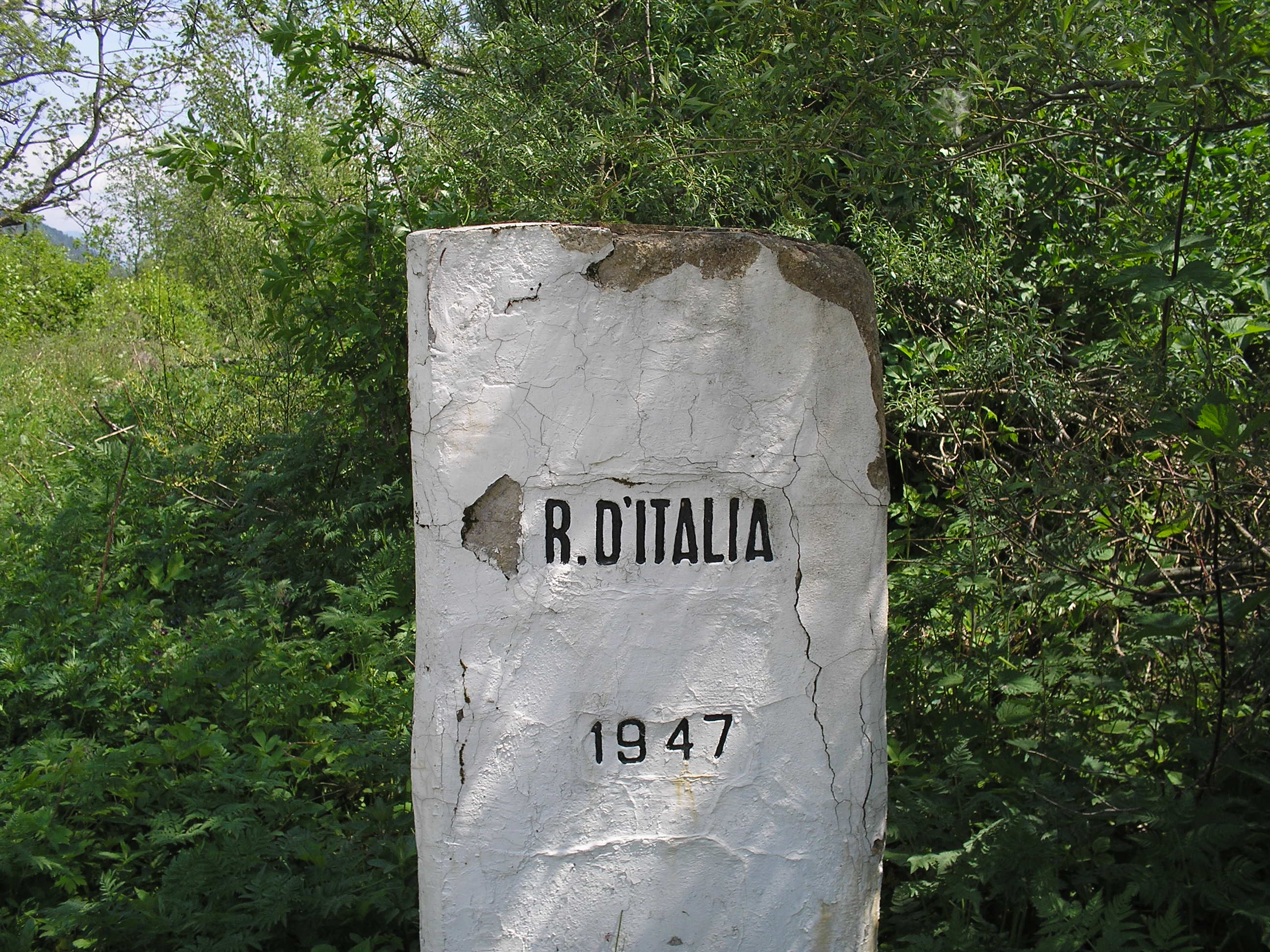
Stone marking the Italy-Slovenia border

== See also ==
- Bai Sema, which delimit sacred areas
- Border barrier
- Butts and bounds
- Dreiherrenstein, historical tripoints of the Holy Roman Empire
- Kudurru
- Landmark
- Milestone, mile peg or kilometre sign
- Survey marker
- Triangulation station (Trig Point – Australia/NZ/UK)
- Tripoint
