= 1996 Pacific hurricane season =

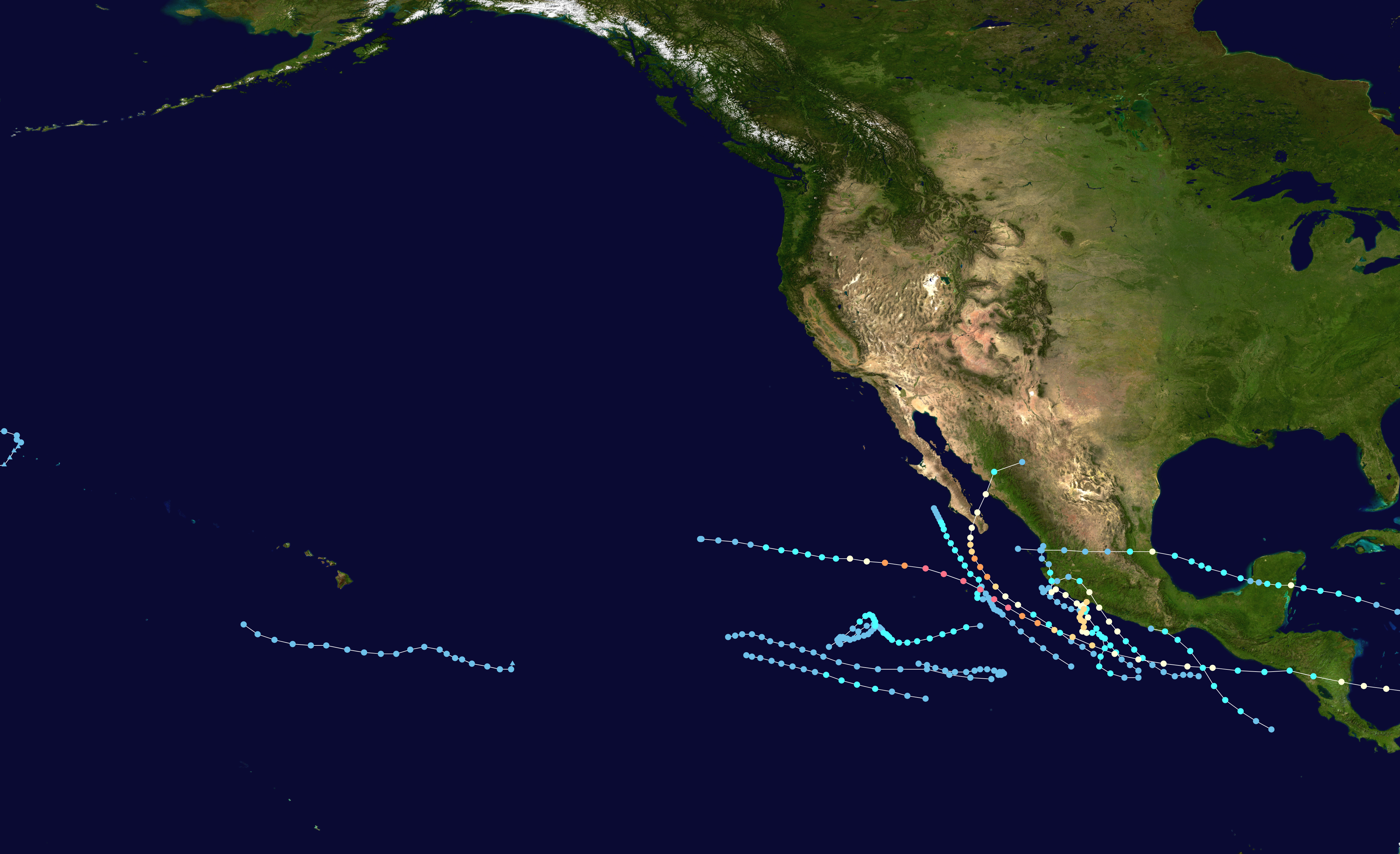
- Season summary map

Seasonal boundaries
- First system formed: May 13, 1996
- Last system dissipated: November 11, 1996

Strongest storm
- Name: Douglas
  - Maximum winds: 130 mph (215 km/h) (1-minute sustained)
  - Lowest pressure: 946 mbar (hPa; 27.94 inHg)

Seasonal statistics
- Total depressions: 15
- Total storms: 9
- Hurricanes: 5
- Major hurricanes (Cat. 3+): 2
- Total fatalities: 46 direct, 2 indirect
- Total damage: $813,000 (1996 USD)

Related articles
- Timeline of the 1996 Pacific hurricane season; 1996 Atlantic hurricane season; 1996 Pacific typhoon season; 1996 North Indian Ocean cyclone season

The 1996 Pacific hurricane season was below-normal in terms of tropical cyclone activity due to an ongoing La Niña, which also suppressed activity in the previous season. There were a total of nine storms named by the National Hurricane Center (NHC), of which five became hurricanes. Two of the hurricanes became a major hurricane, which is a Category 3 or stronger on the Saffir-Simpson scale. With an Accumulated cyclone energy (ACE) index of 53.9, the season ranks among the least intense Pacific hurricane seasons on record. It officially began May 15, 1996, in the eastern north Pacific and on June 1, 1996, in the central north Pacific. It ended on November 30, 1996. These dates conventionally delimit the period of each year when most tropical cyclones form in the northeastern Pacific Ocean. The season slightly exceeded these bounds when tropical storm One-E formed on May 13.

Much of the season's activity was clustered near the coast of Southwest Mexico, with four hurricanes and one tropical storm making landfall along it. The most impactful were: Hurricane Alma, which was responsible for 20 deaths, and Hurricane Fausto, which left behind damage amounting to around $800,000 (1996 USD). Hurricane Douglas was the strongest storm of the season, reaching Category 4 intensity on the Saffir-Simpson Hurricane Scale. Douglas developed in the Caribbean Sea, within the Atlantic basin, as Hurricane Cesar, before crossing into the Pacific as a tropical storm. Another crossover storm was Atlantic Hurricane Dolly, which hit the Mexican state of Veracruz along the Gulf of Mexico and later entered the eastern Pacific as a tropical depression.

== Seasonal summary ==
Least intense Pacific hurricane seasons
Rank	Season	ACE value
1	1977	22.3
2	2010	51.2
3	2007	51.6
4	1996	53.9
5	2003	56.6
6	1979	57.4
7	2004	71.1
8	1981	72.8
9	2013	74.8
10	2020	77.3

The season officially began on May 15 in Eastern Pacific and on June 1 in Central Pacific; both ended on November 30. This season was below average in activity due to an ongoing La Niña, which also suppressed activity in the previous season. In the eastern north Pacific, eleven tropical cyclones formed. Of these, four became hurricanes, one of which were major hurricanes because they reached Category 3 or higher on the Saffir-Simpson Hurricane Scale. The remainder were tropical storms. In addition, one Atlantic hurricane, Cesar, crossed into the Pacific as a tropical storm, at which time it was renamed Douglas. None of the systems in the eastern north Pacific crossed 140°W into the central Pacific. The last time that happened was in the 1979 season.

In the central Pacific, one tropical depression formed. In addition, a depression crossed the dateline from the western Pacific before dissipating in this basin. Neither of these systems reached tropical storm strength. In addition, data from the Joint Typhoon Warning Center, on September 1 Tropical Depression Rick crossed the International Dateline, entering into CPHC's area of responsibility; however, this storm was not included into CPHC database. The storm eventually became extratropical on September 3 over open waters.

In terms of the number of storms, the season was below average. Despite this, there were a large number of landfalls. During a ten-day span from June 23 to July 3, three tropical cyclones approached close to, or made landfall on, Mexico. In all, a record-setting four hurricanes (Alma, Boris, Fausto, and Hernan) struck the coastline.

The Accumulated Cyclone Energy (ACE) index for the 1996 Pacific hurricane season (Eastern Pacific and Central Pacific combined) as calculated by Colorado State University using data from the National Hurricane Center was 53.9 units, (Note: The total represents the sum of the squares of the maximum sustained wind speed (knots) for every (sub)tropical storm's intensity of over 33 knots (38 mph; 61 km/h), divided by 10,000 while they are above that threshold; therefore, tropical depressions are not included.) making this season a below-normal season. It is one of the lowest totals ever recorded, with only the 1977, 2010 and 2007 seasons having a lower ACE.

== Systems ==
=== Unnamed tropical storm (One-E) ===
- Tropical storm (SSHWS)
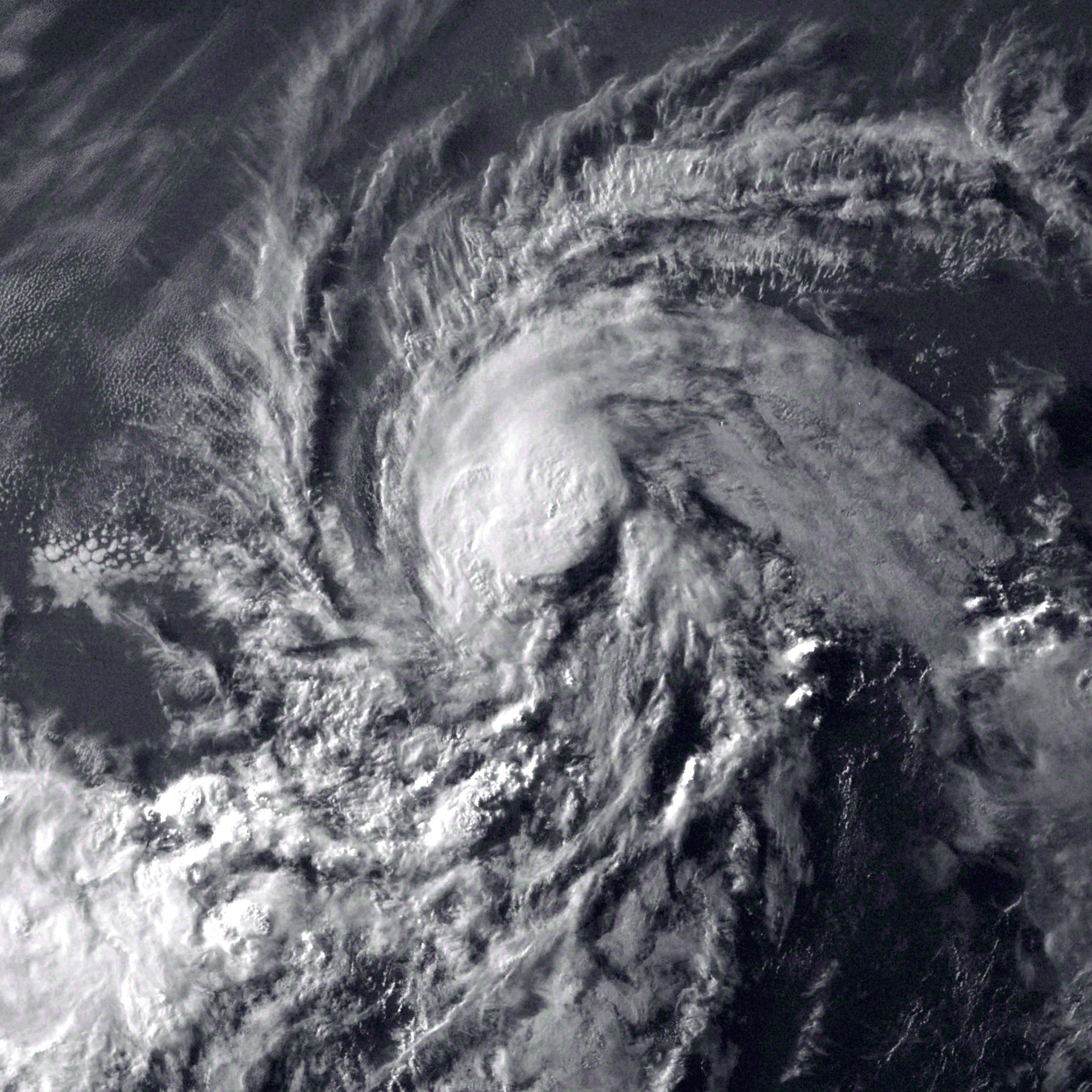
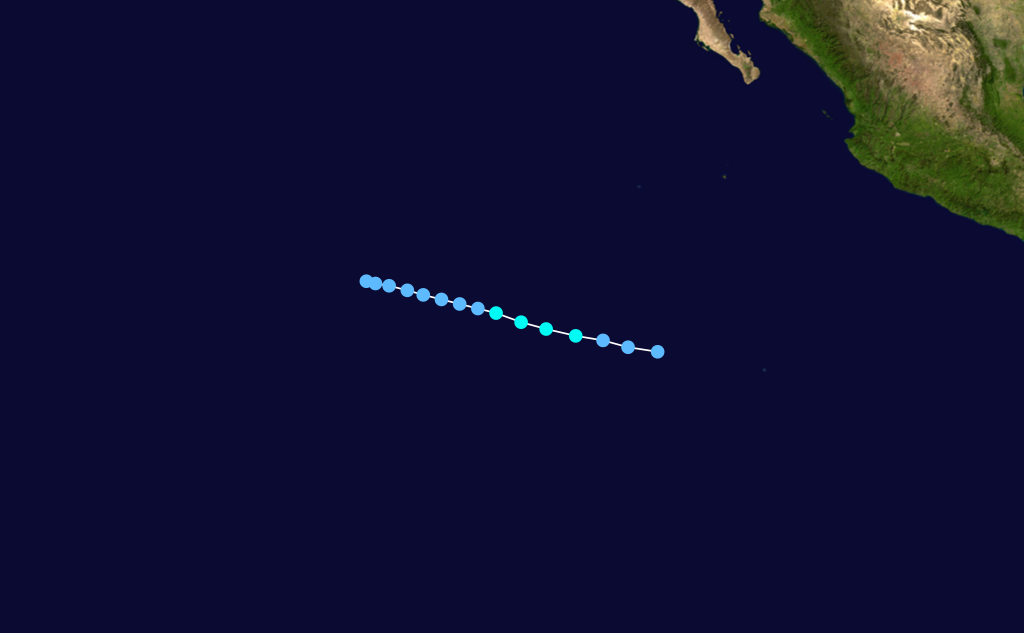
- Duration: May 13 – May 16
- Peak intensity: 50 mph (85 km/h) (1-min); 1000 mbar (hPa)

The season had an early start on May 13 when a tropical wave in the open ocean organized into Tropical Depression One-E. The depression moved west-northwest and strengthened into a tropical storm on May 14. On that day, the tropical storm reached its peak intensity, with maximum sustained winds at 50 mph (80 km/h) and a minimum central pressure of 1,000 hPa (29.53 inHg). Wind shear steadily weakened the cyclone until it dissipated early on May 17. This system was the only tropical storm to form in May during the period from 1992 to 1999.

This storm was not assigned a name because it was determined to be a tropical storm after the season was over. Subsequently, wind reports relayed from the US Coast Guard to the National Hurricane Center suggested that this cyclone was a tropical storm. This tropical cyclone impacted two ships. The first—called the True Blue—was near the fringes of the storm and escaped. The other—the trimaran Solar Wind—provided wind observations until communications with the vessel were lost after 0600 UTC on May 14. Despite a search by the US Coast Guard, the ship and its two-person crew were never found.

=== Tropical Depression Two-E ===
- Tropical depression (SSHWS)
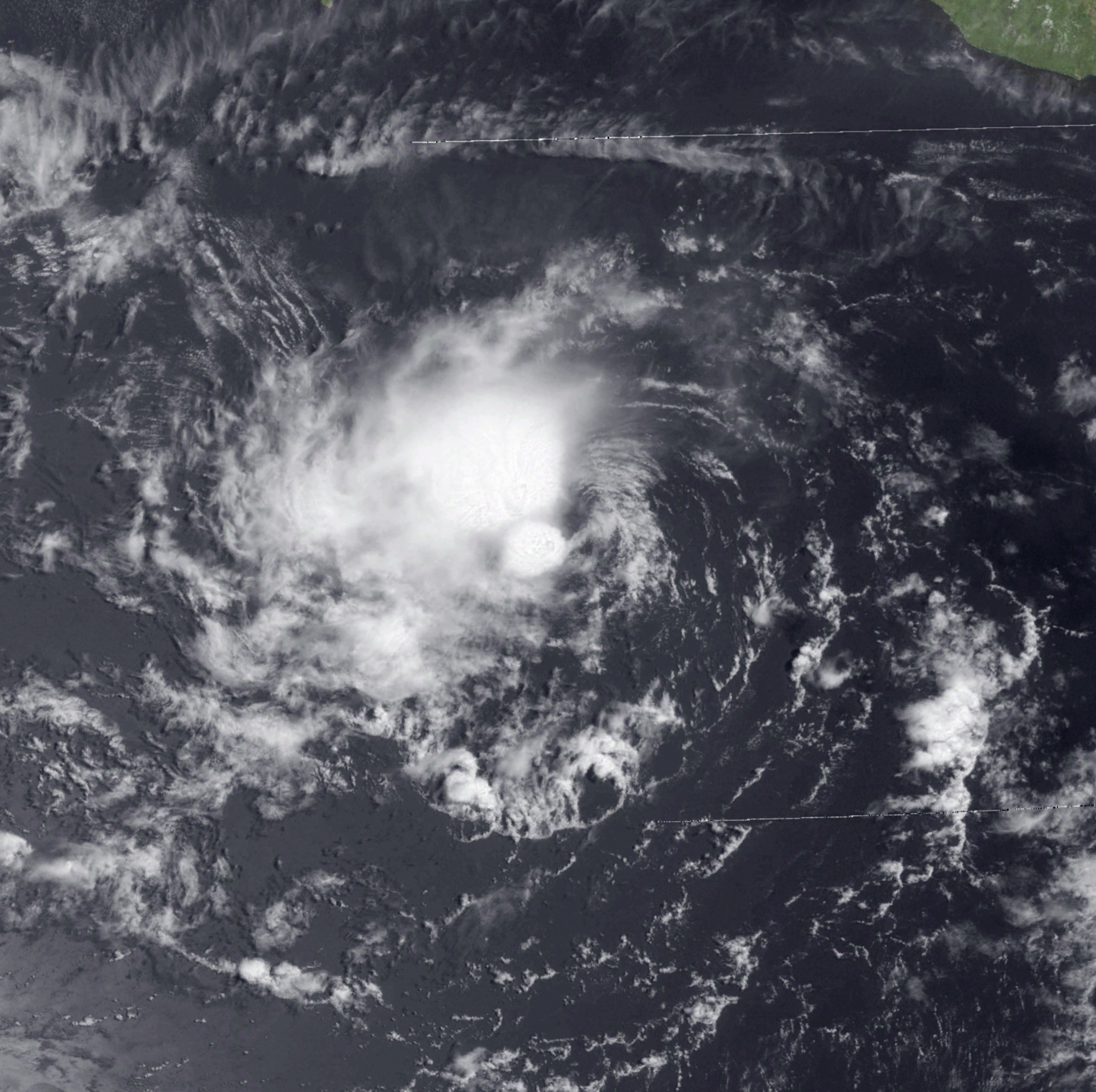
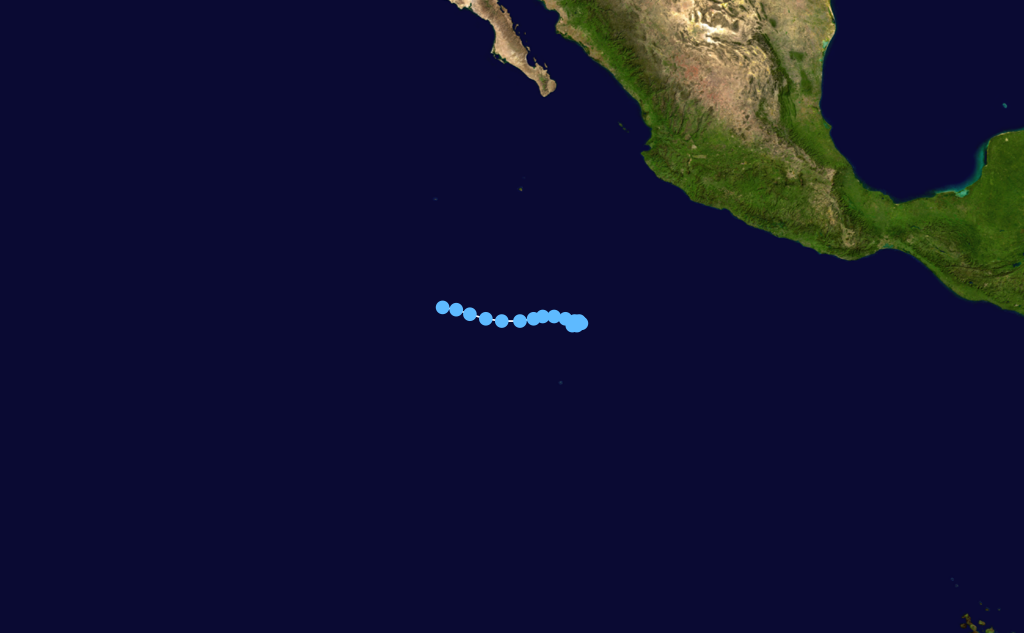
- Duration: May 15 – May 19
- Peak intensity: 35 mph (55 km/h) (1-min); 1006 mbar (hPa)

On May 15 an area of disturbed weather in the Intertropical Convergence Zone developed into a tropical depression. The disturbance was not readily traceable back to a tropical wave from the Atlantic. On its first day of its existence, Tropical Depression Two-E was a well-organized system with maximum sustained winds of 35 mph (56 km/h) and a minimum central pressure of 1,006 mbar (29.7 inHg). As it slowly moved west, Two-E experienced a few intermittent bursts of convection. However, the depression gradually became less organized during the remainder of its life. On May 18, the cyclone's organization deteriorated markedly until it dissipated the next morning.

=== Hurricane Alma ===
- Category 2 hurricane (SSHWS)
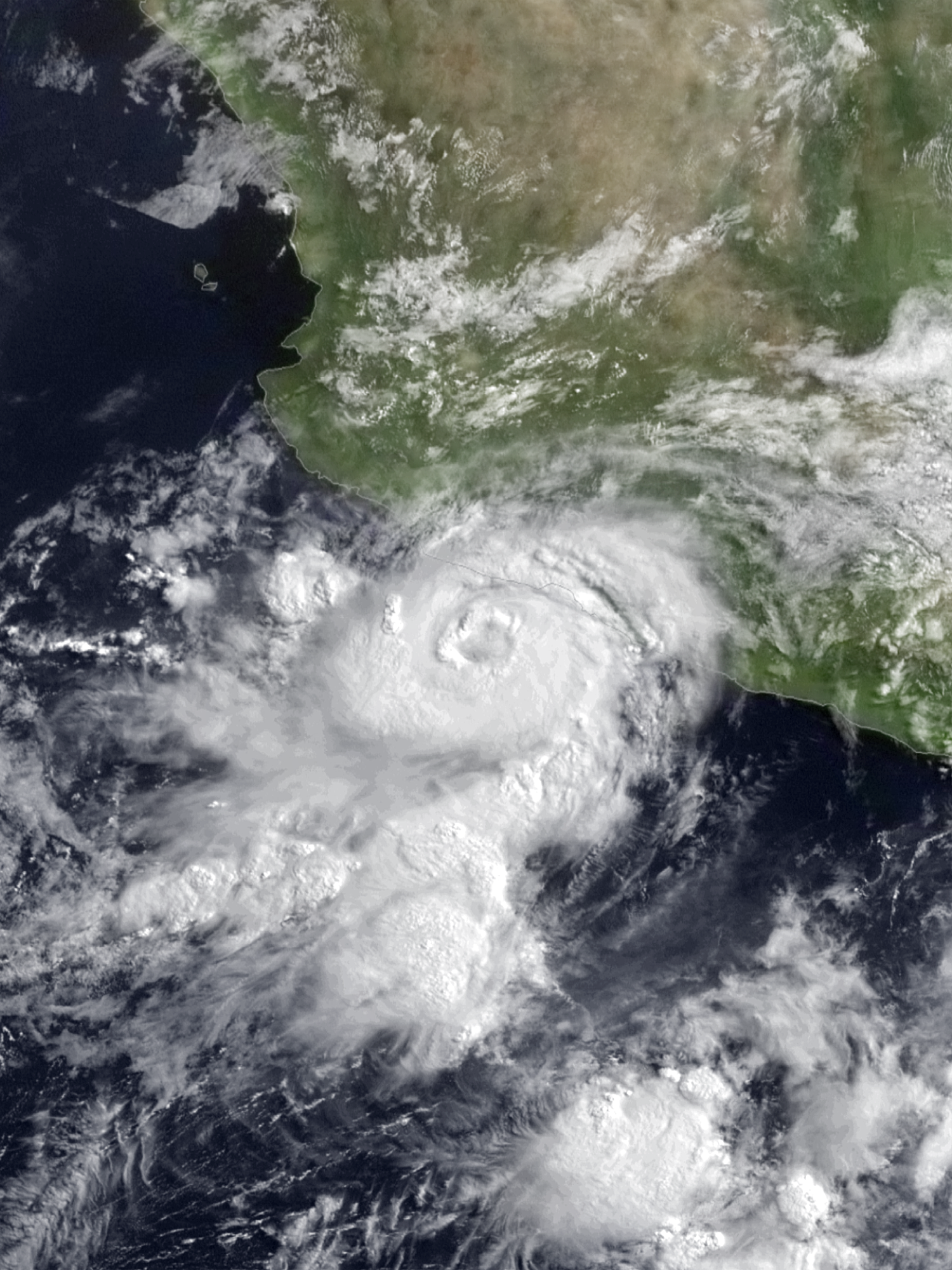
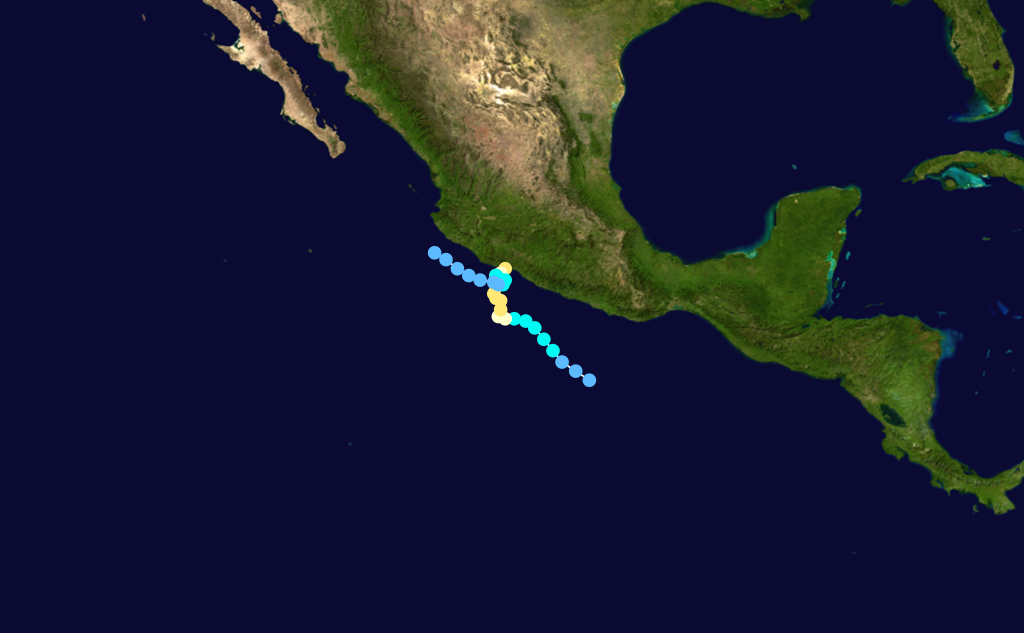
- Duration: June 20 – June 27
- Peak intensity: 105 mph (165 km/h) (1-min); 969 mbar (hPa)

The origins of Alma is believed to be related to the tropical wave which spawned Tropical Storm Arthur in the Atlantic. Satellite imagery and upper–air observations indicated that the disturbance crossed Central America during the middle of June, entering warming than average waters of the Pacific. Initially, the system was located within a sheared environment, although it did not hinder development. The convection soon became aligned with the low–level center and during the overnight on June 20 it was designated as a tropical depression. The depression intensified and it was upgraded to Tropical Storm Alma later that day. The wind shear relaxed it was upgraded to a hurricane at early on July 22 while tracking generally northwest. A mid–level trough located near Baja California and a mid-to-upper-level low over the southwest Gulf of Mexico began to steer Alma northward towards the southwest coast of Mexico, prior to reaching a peak intensity of 969 mb at 1200 UTC on June 23. Before long, the steering flow collapsed and the hurricane drifted further towards land. Later that day it made landfall near Lazaro Cardenas, although Alma quickly moved back over open water and meandered for about 36 hours. This made the hurricane the first of three consecutive storms to make landfall on, the Pacific coast of Mexico during a ten-day span. It weakened to a tropical storm over land, before moving back to the open waters. However, a small portion of the circulation of Alma was still over land, and thus it was severely disrupted by Mexico's high terrain. Alma was tracking slowly along a path roughly parallel to the coastline, it was further downgraded to a tropical depression on June 25. Alma remained weak and dissipated on June 27.

In anticipation for the storm, hurricane warnings were placed into effect along 175 mi (282 km) of coastline between the resorts of Zihuatenejo and Manzanillo. Hundreds of people were evacuated prior to the passage of the hurricane. Also, the Mexican government sent troops to the area to help with disaster relief, and the Michoacán state government sent five truckloads of bedding and medicines. In the Mexican states of Guerrero and Michoacán, the hurricane generated estimated wind gusts of up to 100 mph (160 km/h), and dropped large amounts of rainfall peaking at 19.09 in (485 mm) of rainfall just east of where it had made landfall. Also, there were reports of swells up to 12 ft (3.7 m) along the coast. Three people died in Lazaro Cardenas when their house collapsed. Alma ripped roofs off of some houses, downed power lines and uprooted numerous trees, Flooding for Alma left thousands homeless. Heavy rainfall resulted in major flooding in Puebla, which killed 17 people. In all, 20 deaths were reported in Mexico.

=== Hurricane Boris ===
- Category 1 hurricane (SSHWS)
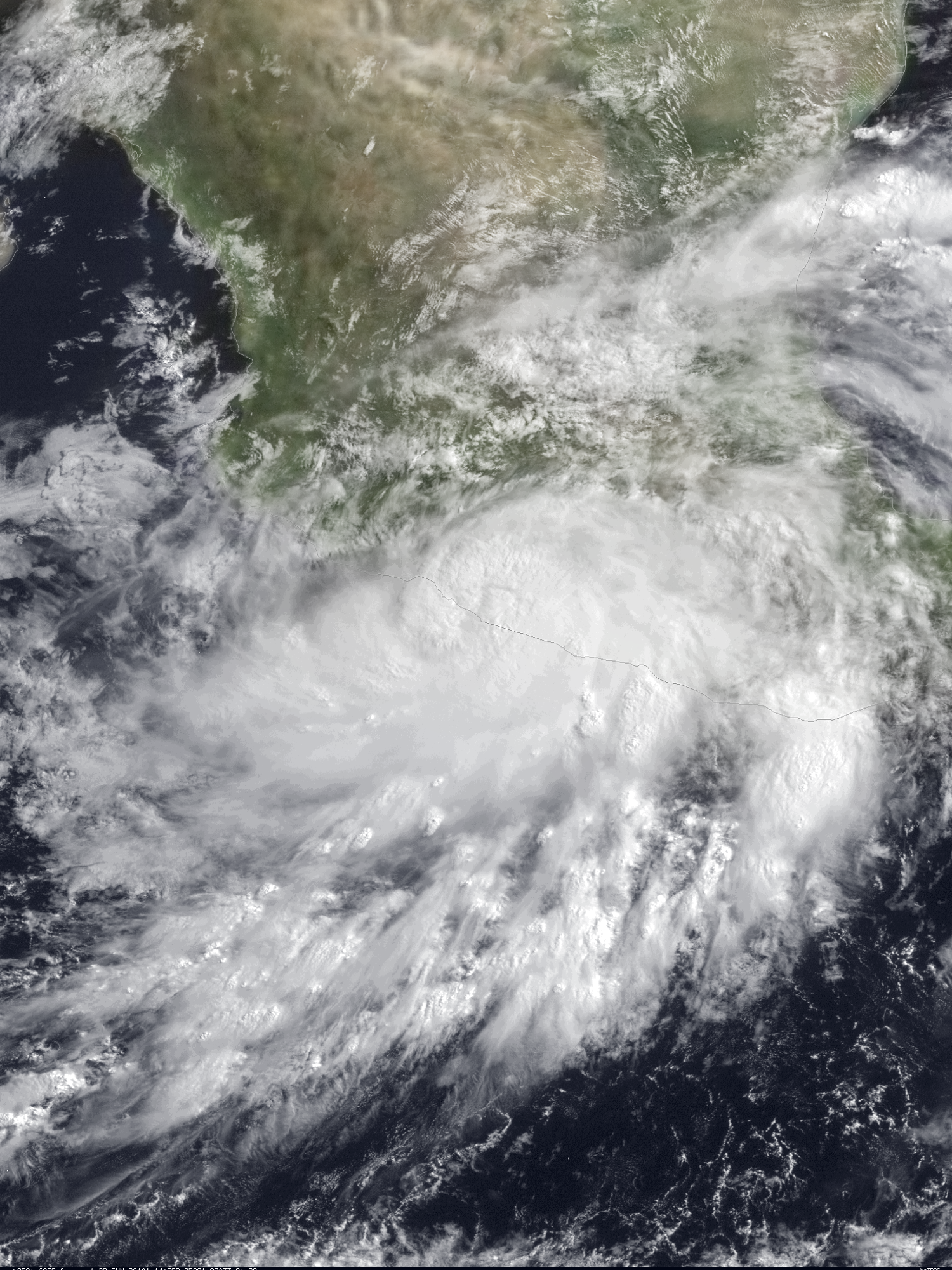
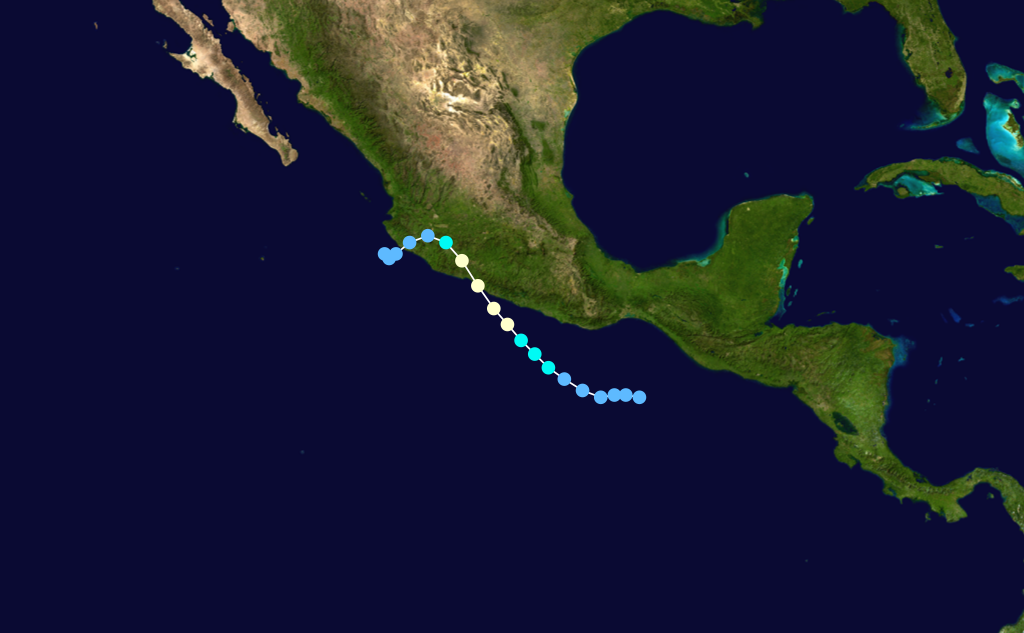
- Duration: June 27 – July 1
- Peak intensity: 90 mph (150 km/h) (1-min); 979 mbar (hPa)

Hurricane Boris originated from a tropical wave that moved off the west coast of Africa on June 8. The poorly organized wave tracked westward across the Atlantic Ocean and Caribbean Sea and entered the Pacific Ocean on June 23. The first signs of a circulation on satellite imagery appeared on June 26, centered about 250 miles (400 km) south of the Gulf of Tehuantepec. The system gained enough circulation definition and rainbands to acquire tropical depression status on June 27. The rate of intensification increased and the depression became a tropical storm on June 28. Boris reached hurricane intensity on June 28 and peaked with winds of 90 mph (140 km/h) and a central pressure of 979 mbar (28.9 inHg). It developed a ragged eye in the center. Boris made landfall on June 29 about midway between Lázaro Cárdenas and Acapulco. Boris then moved offshore after turning to the southwest and dissipated on July 1 while south of Puerto Vallarta.

Hurricane warnings were issued for southern Mexico due to Boris. The caused ten deaths. One person was killed in Tecpan. Nearby, three other people drowned and five fishers were missing. In Acapulco, a child was killed when a roof collapsed. Also, in Acapulco, strong surf pushed fishing boats against a sea wall. Trees were downed, and business signs were blown down. Streets were flooded to the level of the tires. Trees were knocked down. A total of about 10,000 people were left homeless, and at least 70 people were injured. Rain was heavy throughout the impacted region, with the highest totals in Guerrero. A total of 12.16 inches (309 mm) was recorded in Coyuca de Benítez. The highest total was 14.98 inches (380 mm) at Paso de San Antonio, to the east of the point of landfall. The heavy rain caused damaging floods on the Balsas River, which left at least 5000 homeless. In Tecpan, a countless number of homes were washed away. Winds went as high as 90 miles per hour (140 km/h). The storm flooded lobbies of hotels along the coast. Approximately 12 boats were sunk offshore. Tecpan bore the brunt of the storm, reporting heavy damage.

=== Tropical Storm Cristina ===
- Tropical storm (SSHWS)
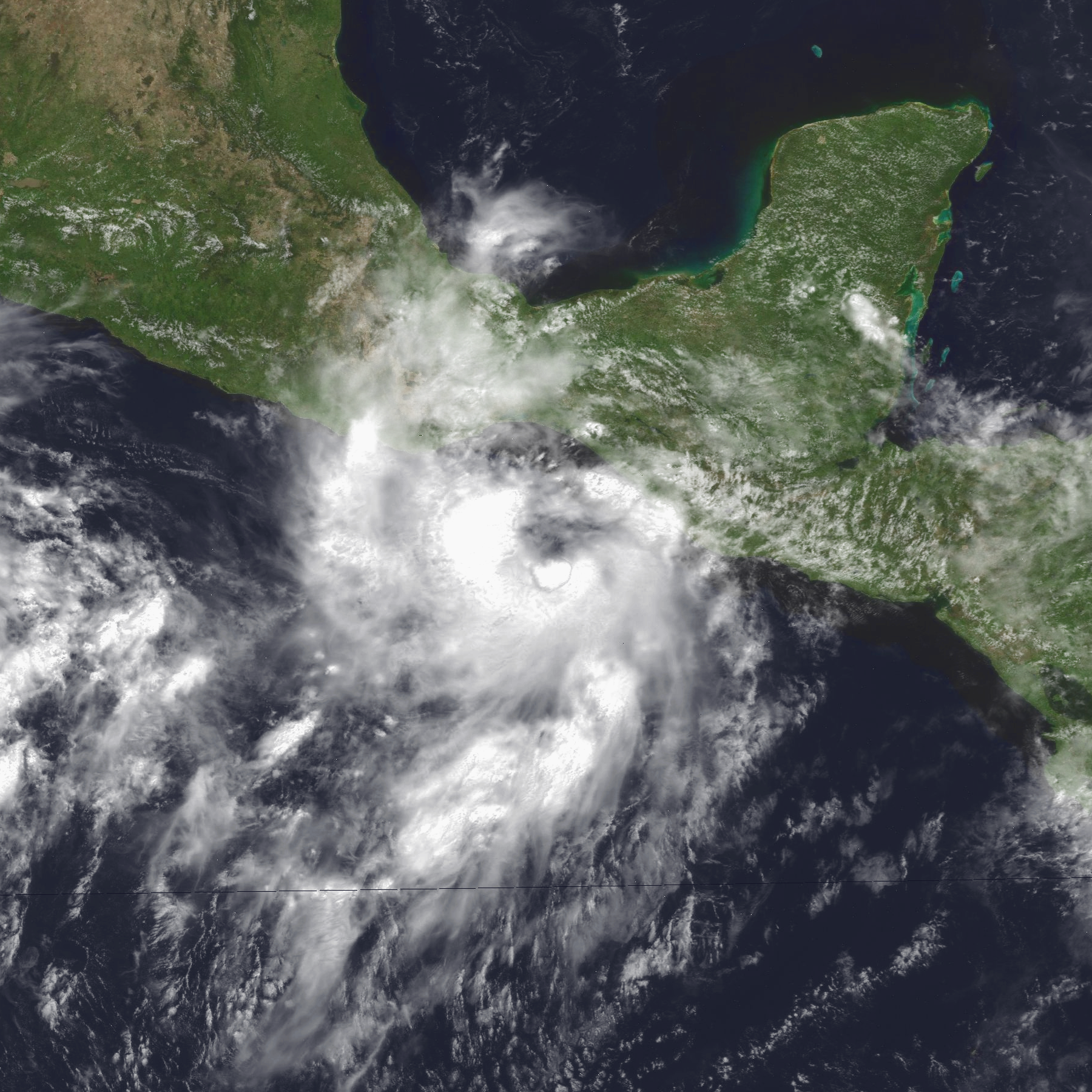
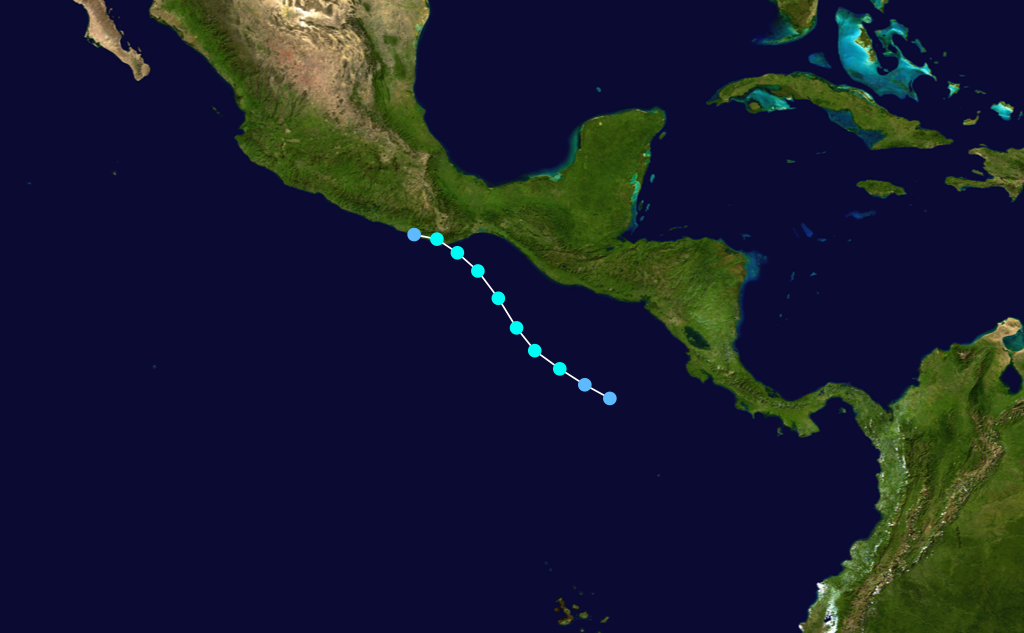
- Duration: July 1 – July 3
- Peak intensity: 70 mph (110 km/h) (1-min); 991 mbar (hPa)

Cristina likely originated from area of thunderstorms that was affiliated with a tropical wave that had passed over Panama on June 29. By June 30, thunderstorm activity increased while located west the Pacific coast of Central America. At 1200 UTC July 1, as convective banding became organized, the National Hurricane Center initialed advisories Tropical Depression Five-E. At this time, the low located 300 miles (480 km) south of San Salvador, El Salvador. Quickly organizing, the depression was upgraded into Tropical Storm Cristina while 260 miles (420 km) south of Guatemala City, Guatemala. With warm water and low wind shear, Cristina strengthened to peak winds of 70 mph (110 km/h) and a minimum pressure of 991 mbar (hPa). Early on July 3, the center of Tropical Storm Cristina crossed the Mexican coast near Puerto Ángel at peak intensity. Within six hours, Cristina had weakened into a minimal tropical storm over the mountainous terrain of Mexico. By early July 3, the remnants of the tropical storm had completely dissipated.

On July 2, the Mexican government issued a tropical storm warning from the Mexico–Guatemala border to Punta Maldonado, Guerrero. Cristina was the third storm to hit the region in less than two weeks. Tropical Storm Cristina dropped extremely heavy precipitation over southern Mexico and over 1,350 sites received rain. Many areas received more than 10 in (250 mm) of rainfall and a peak of 15.12 in (384 mm) fell in San Pedro Tapanatepec. One fisherman drowned, another went missing, and another was found alive after their fishing boat sank off the coast of Oaxaca. Flash flooding and mudslides in Oaxaca killed five and in Guerrero at least seven people died. In the latter state, 51 communities were flooded, thus leaving 350 people homeless. In addition, 62 people were declared missing when eleven fishing boats were reported missing on July 2. On July 18, President Zedillo held meetings with the victims of Hurricane Boris and Cristina in Tecpan and Acapulco.

=== Tropical Depression Six-E ===
- Tropical depression (SSHWS)
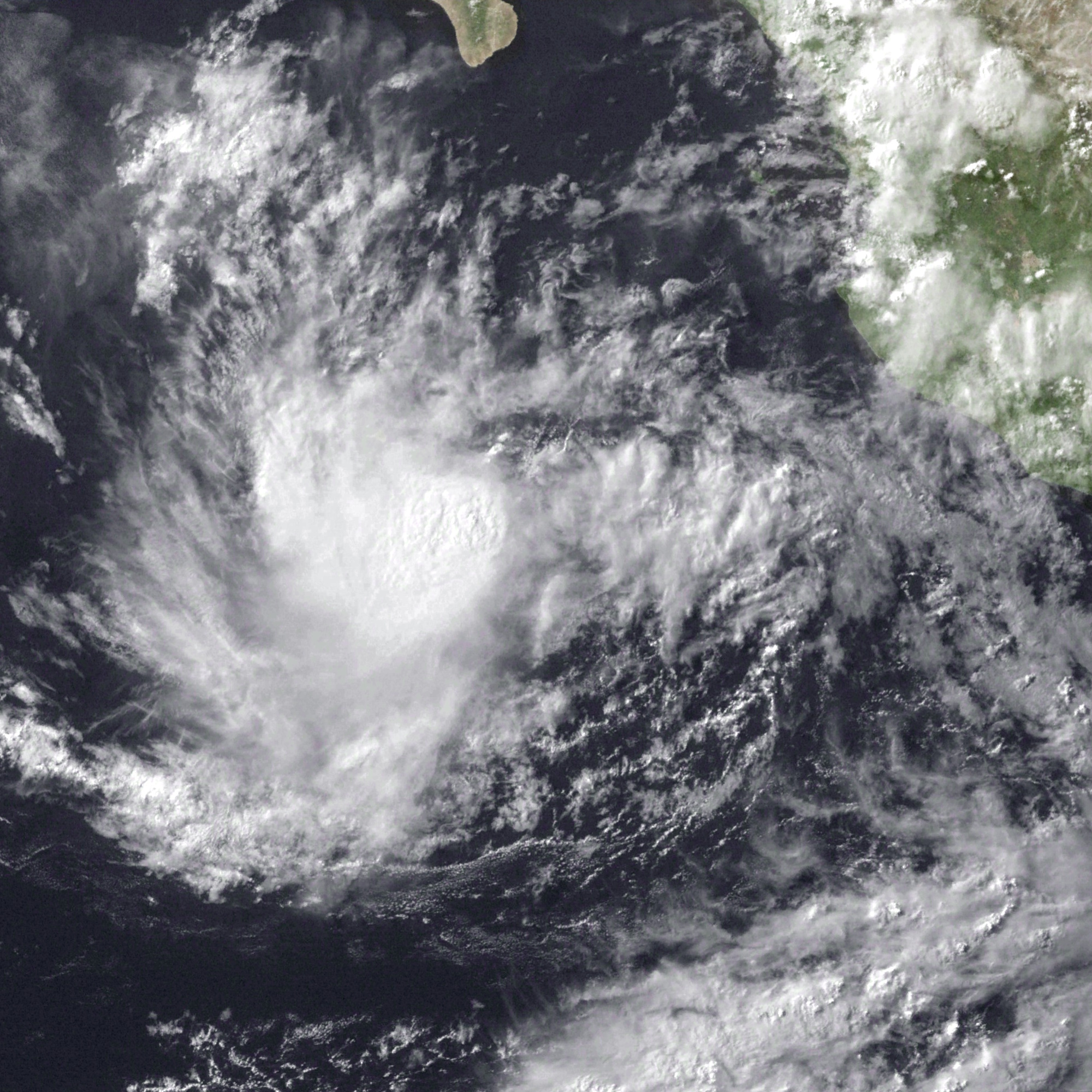
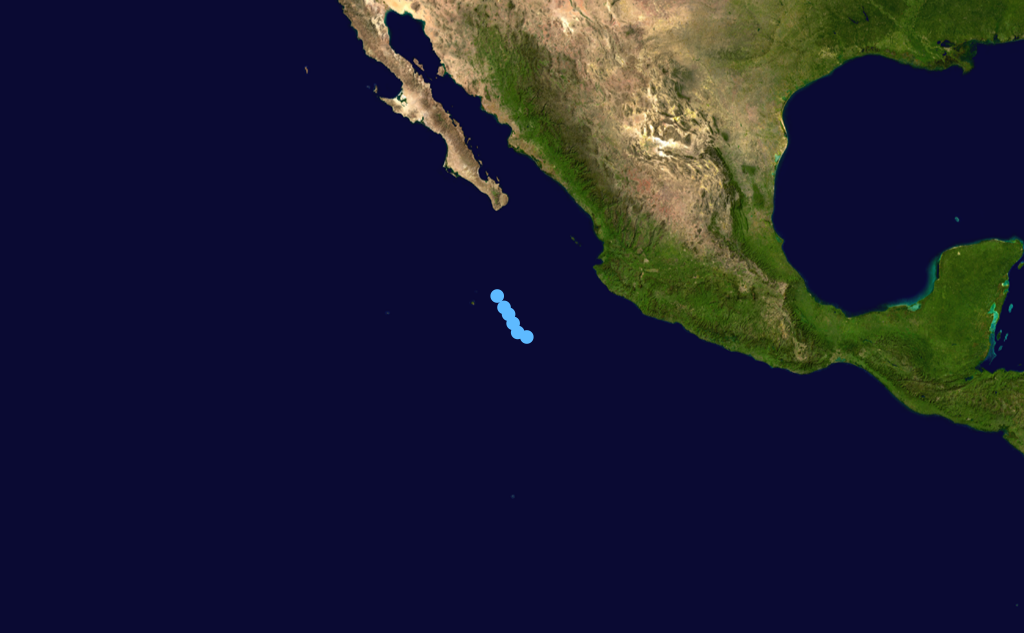
- Duration: July 4 – July 6
- Peak intensity: 35 mph (55 km/h) (1-min); 1003 mbar (hPa)

On July 4, a persistent area of thunderstorms organized into a tropical depression. Weak steering currents slowly moved it northwest. Easterly wind shear inhibited the development of the system. Despite the wind shear, Six-E was forecast to strengthen into a tropical storm, but it instead weakened to a swirl of clouds and advisories were ended on July 5. Tropical Depression Six-E dissipated on July 6. At its peak strength, Six-E had winds of 35 mph (56 km/h) and a central pressure of 1,003 mbar (29.6 inHg).

=== Hurricane Douglas ===
- Category 4 hurricane (SSHWS)
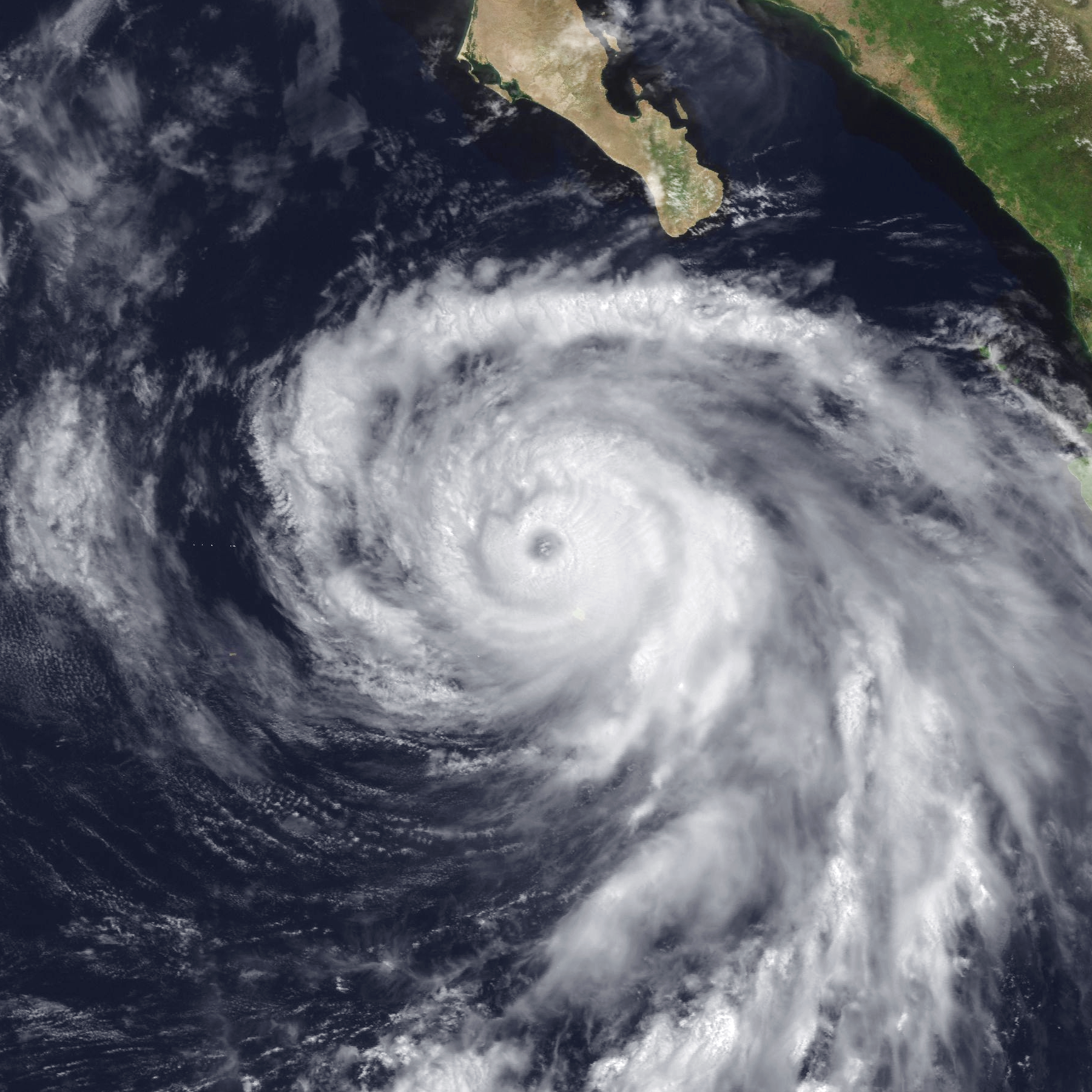
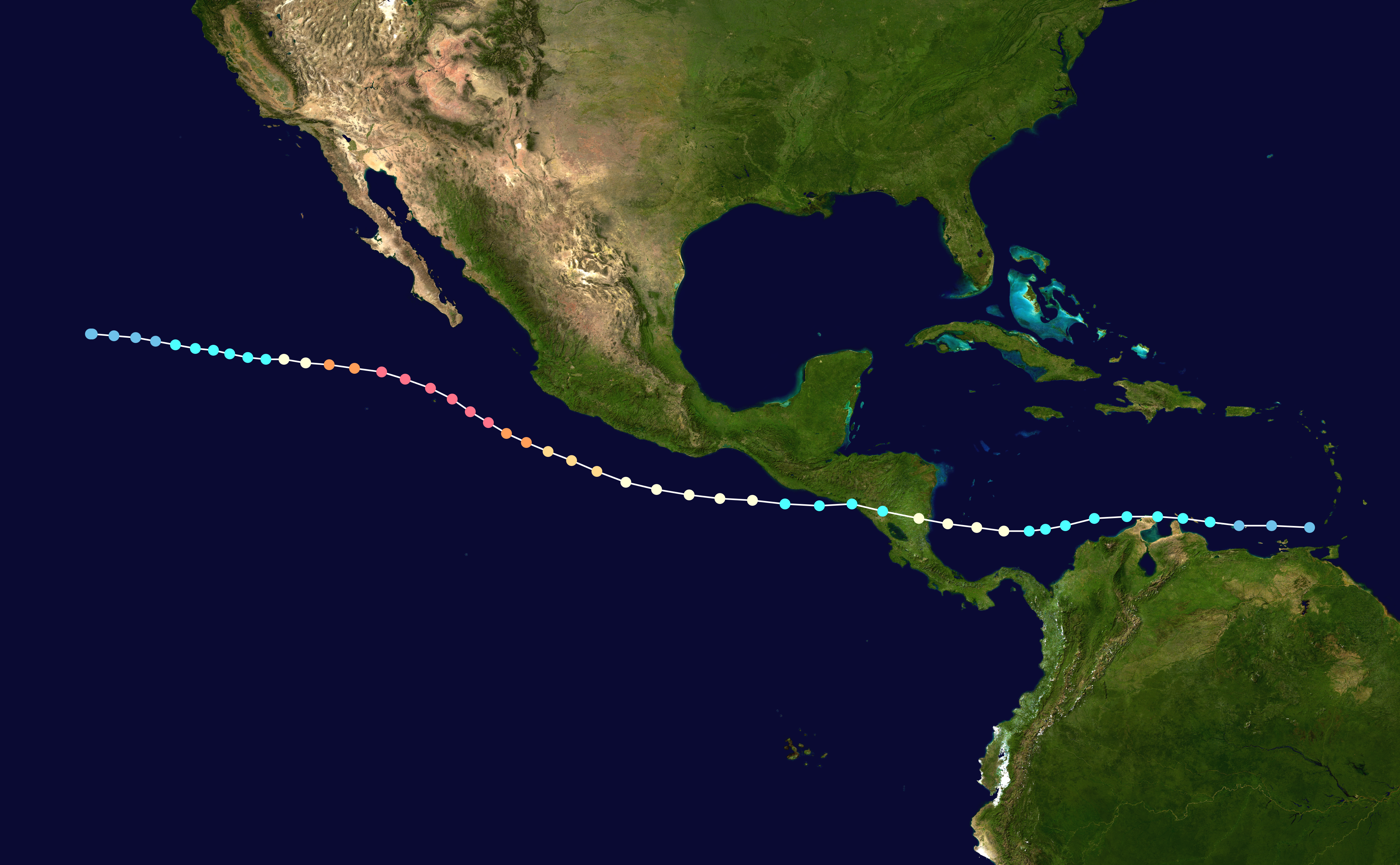
- Duration: July 29 (Entered basin) – August 6
- Peak intensity: 130 mph (215 km/h) (1-min); 946 mbar (hPa)

Hurricane Douglas was a continuation of Atlantic Hurricane Cesar, which crossed Central America. Continuing Cesar's nearly due-west heading, it was still a tropical storm when it entered the Pacific on July 29, and quickly regained hurricane status. Douglas strengthened over the next two days as it turned west-northwest, paralleling the coast of Mexico. It reached its peak intensity on August 1, with winds of 130 mph (210 km/h) and a central pressure of 946 mbar (27.9 inHg), making it the strongest hurricane of the season at a Category 4 strength. It slow weakening began on August 2 as it entered cooler waters, and it officially dissipated on August 6, though like many Pacific hurricanes, a remnant circulation could be tracked westward for several days afterward.

Compared with the long-term average, Hurricane Douglas was a well-forecast storm. The cyclone passed close enough to Mexico to necessitate a tropical storm warning starting on July 29 for the coast from Salina Cruz to Acapulco, with a watch along a further section of coast. The watches and warnings were discontinued on July 30. Hurricane Douglas brought up to 6 in (150 mm) of rain on the south coast of Mexico and resulted in a 4-ft (1.2-m) storm surge.

=== Tropical Depression Seventeen-W ===
- Tropical depression (SSHWS)
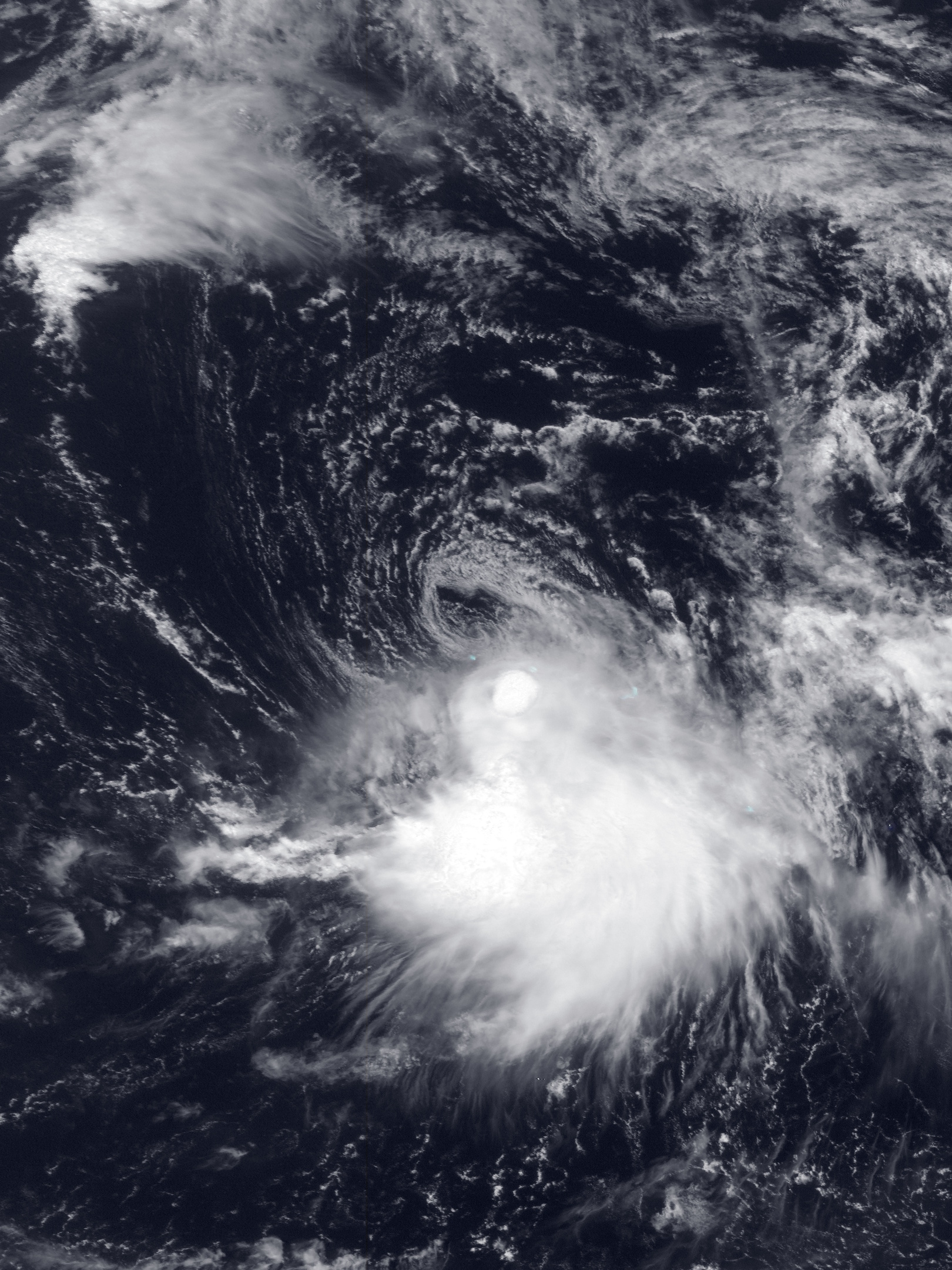
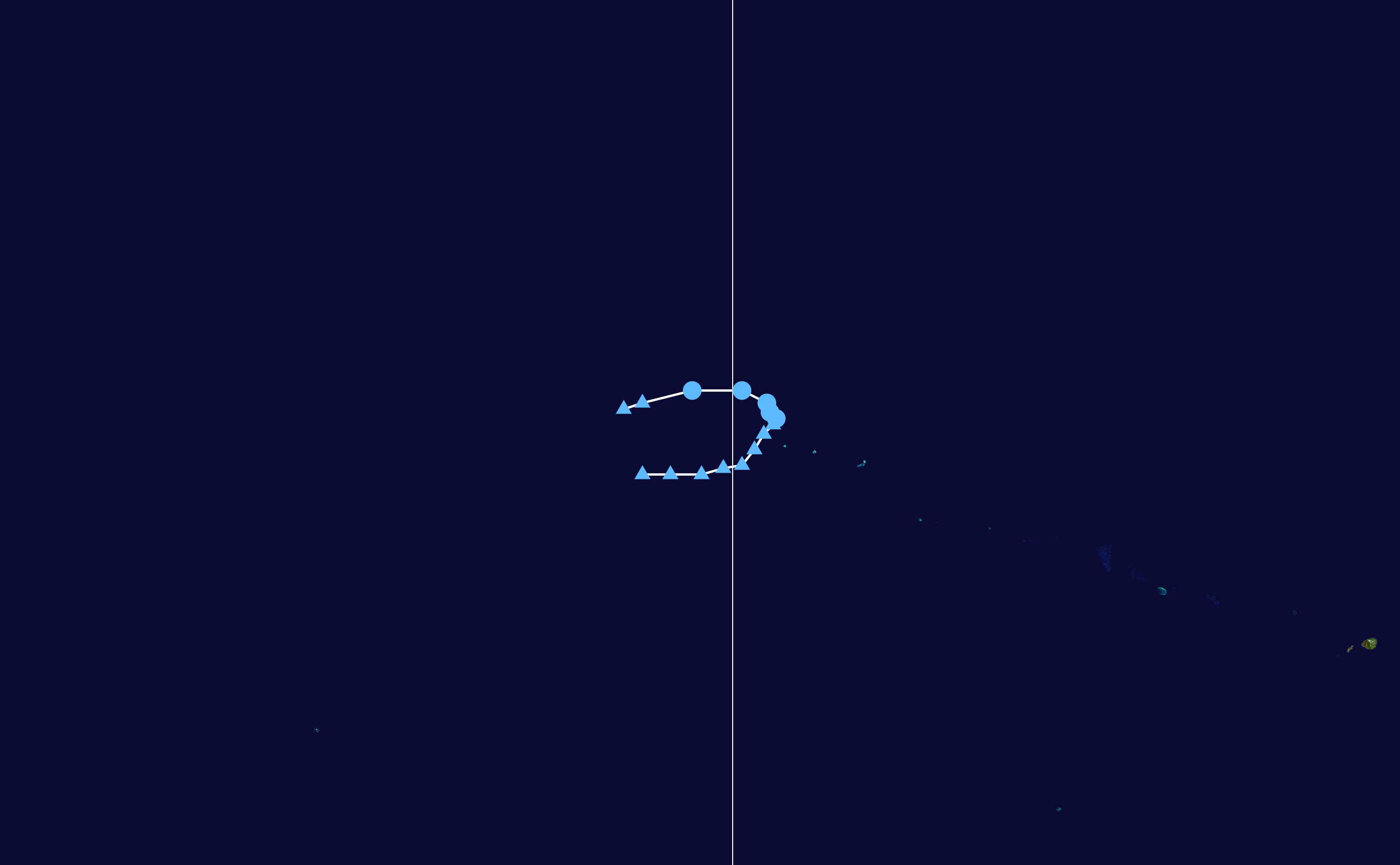
- Duration: August 14 (entered basin) – August 15
- Peak intensity: 35 mph (55 km/h) (1-min); 1000 mbar (hPa)

A tropical depression, which formed on August 13, from a cutoff area of low pressure area, crossed the dateline on August 14. It continued to head east, passing close to Midway Island. It dissipated on August 14, although the remnants of the system hung around the area for a few more days. At its strongest in the central north Pacific, Tropical Depression Seventeen-W had winds of 35 mph (56 km/h) and a pressure of 1,000 mbar (30 inHg).

Seventeen-W brought light winds, with gusts reaching gale-force, to Midway Island. It also brought about 2.5 in (64 mm) of rain. After the cyclone dissipated, showers and gusty winds continued to occur on Midway and Kure for a few more days.

=== Tropical Depression Dolly ===
- Tropical depression (SSHWS)
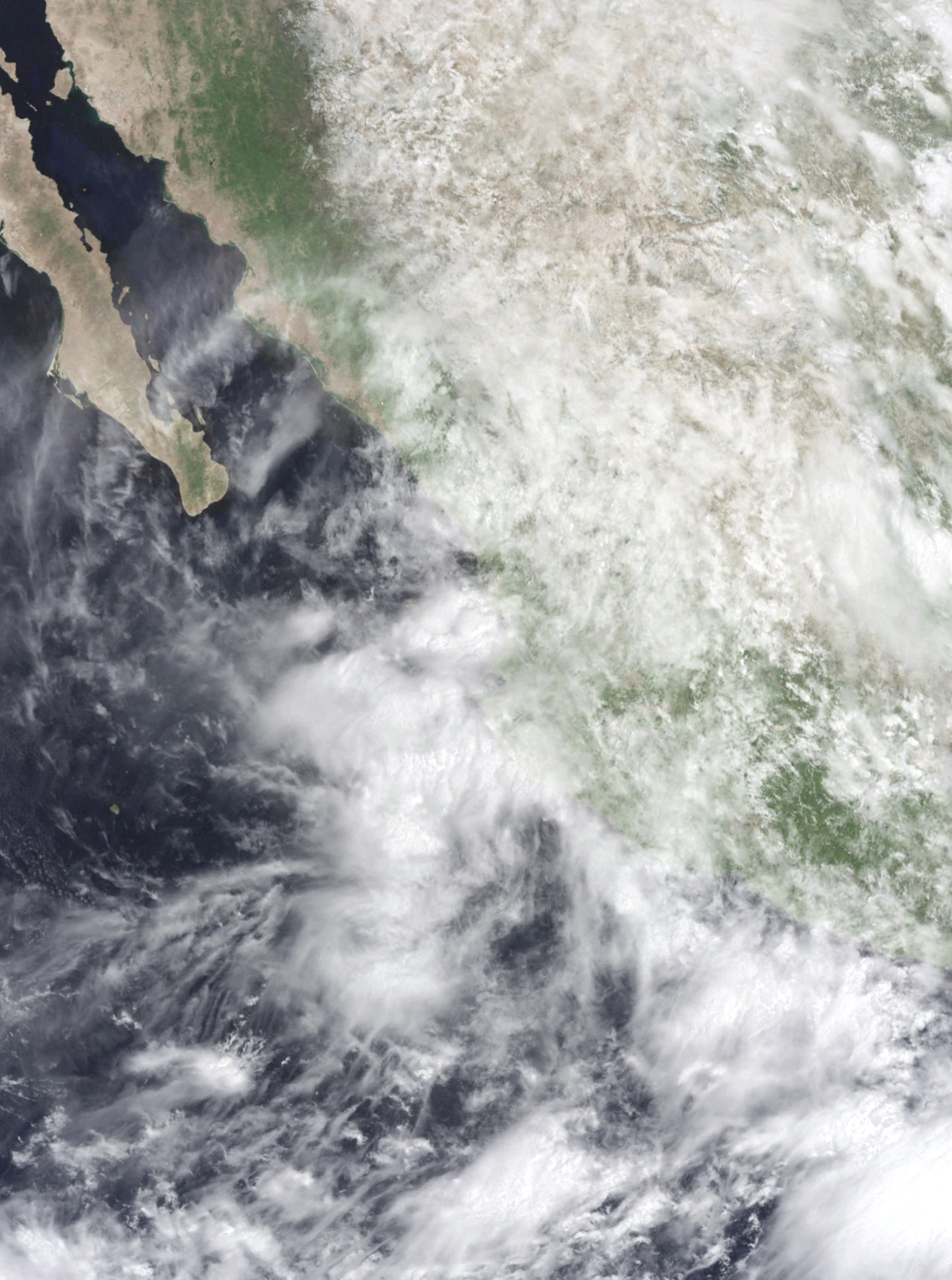
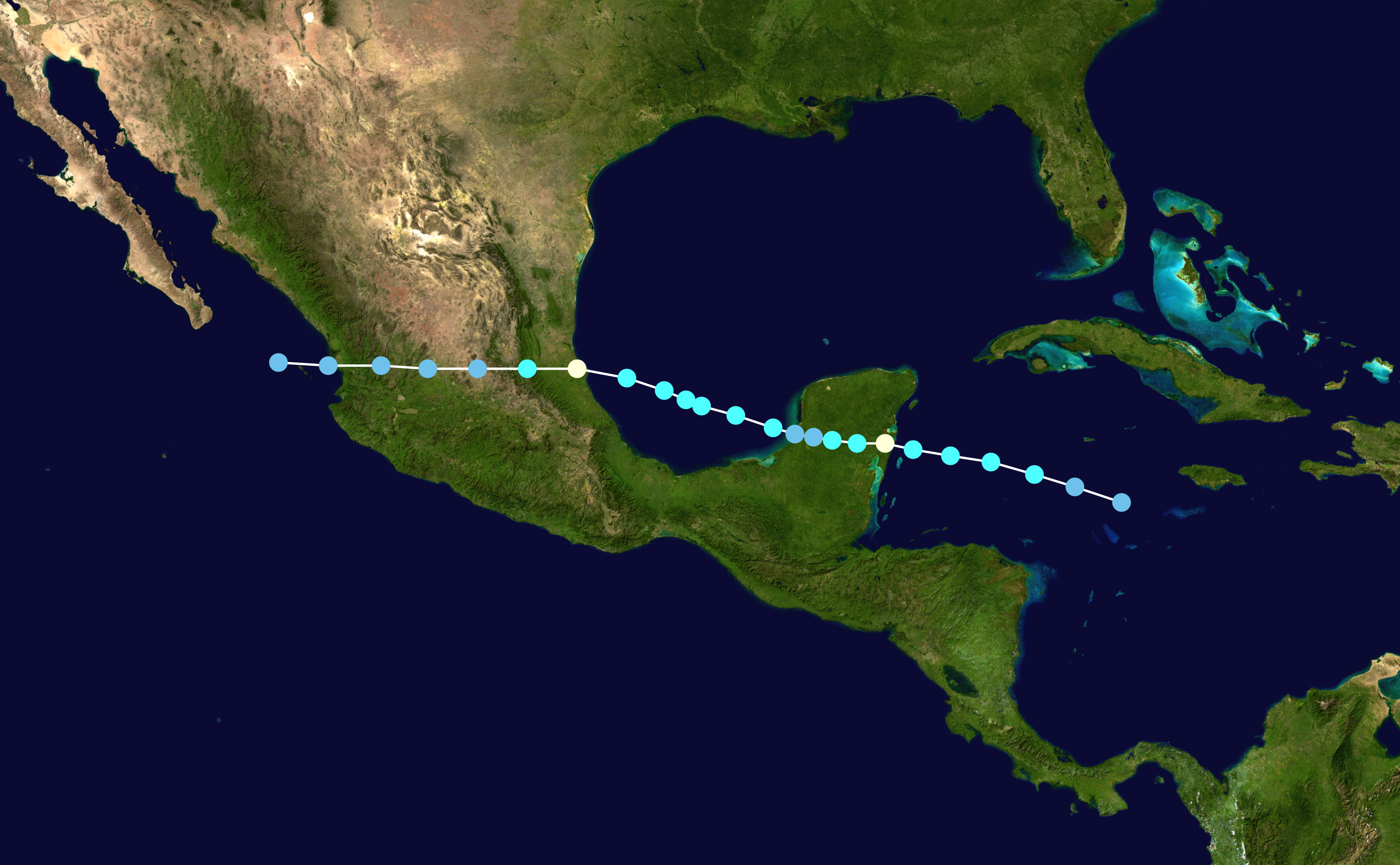
- Duration: August 24 (Entered basin) – August 25
- Peak intensity: 25 mph (35 km/h) (1-min); 1005 mbar (hPa)

After making landfall along the Bay of Campeche coast north of Tuxpan, Veracruz, Hurricane Dolly managed to maintain its tropical characteristics while crossing the Mexican Plateau, and entered the eastern Pacific as a tropical depression late on August 24. Though the system entered the eastern Pacific intact, the National Hurricane Center did not re-classify it as an eastern Pacific tropical depression, nor were any coastal advisories issued. No re-intensification occurred after the system entered the eastern Pacific, and it dissipated early the following day, just west of San Juanito in the Islas Marías.

=== Tropical Storm Elida ===
- Tropical storm (SSHWS)
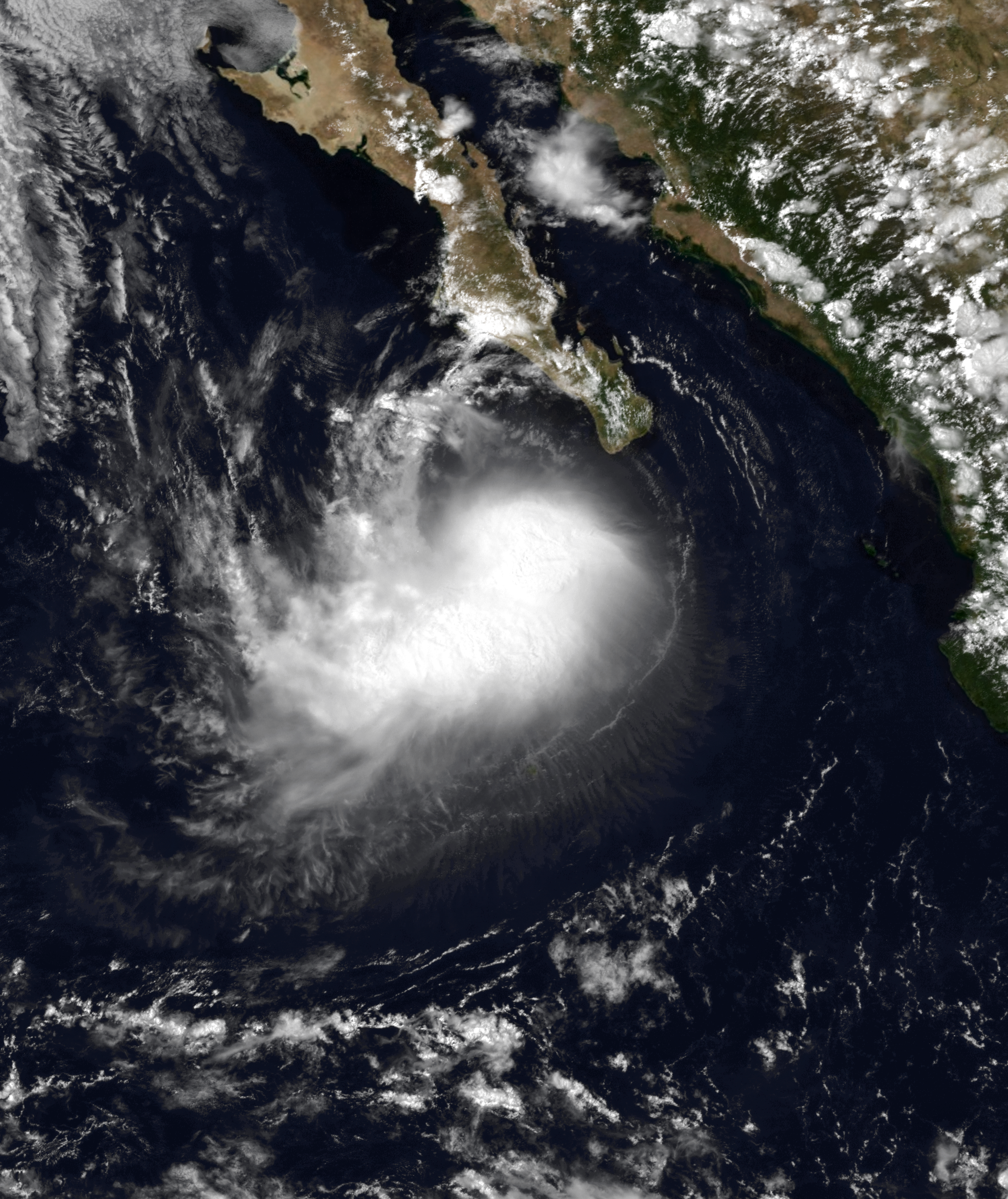
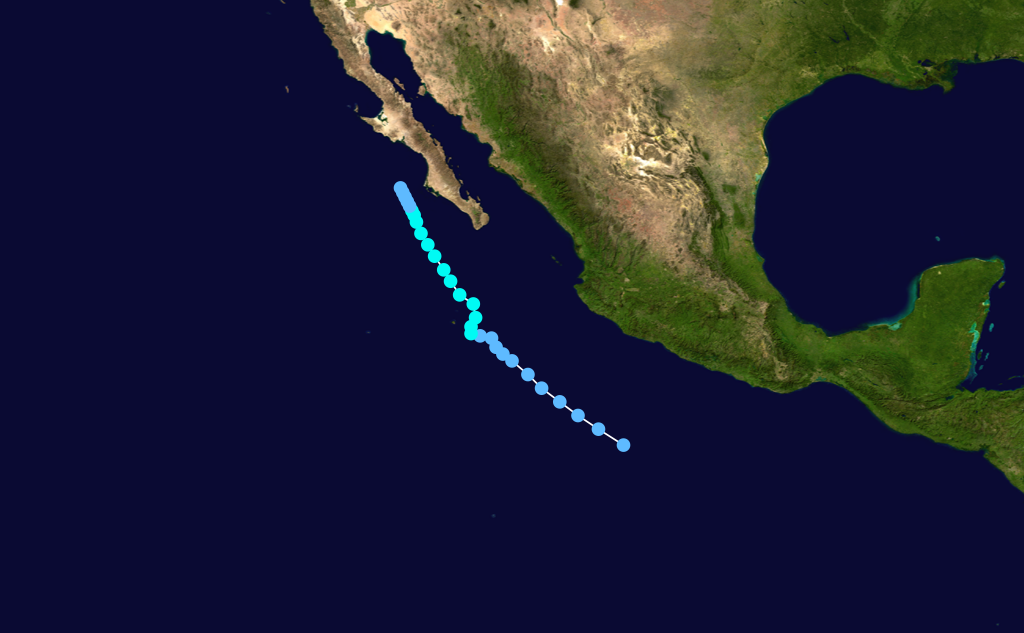
- Duration: August 30 – September 6
- Peak intensity: 65 mph (100 km/h) (1-min); 994 mbar (hPa)

A tropical wave moved across the tropical Atlantic during mid to late August, developing a small area of thunderstorms each day. After it moved into the Pacific Ocean, thunderstorm activity became more concentrated. On August 30, and it developed into Tropical Depression Eight-E to the south of Mexico. It moved northwestward parallel to the coast of Mexico, and strengthened into Tropical Storm Elida on September 2. Despite some wind shear, Elida continued to strengthen as it developed rainbands. An upper low moved to the north of the system, slowing its forward movement and shifting its track more northerly in the direction of Baja California. Elida posed enough of a threat to the Baja California Peninsula to require a tropical storm warning and hurricane watches for the Baja California Peninsula south of Cabo San Lázaro on September 3. On September 3 and 4, Elida came close to the southern tip of the Baja California Peninsula at its peak intensity of 994 mbar (29.4 inHg) and winds of 65 mph (105 km/h). A combination of vertical wind shear and reduced sea surface temperatures weakened the storm. The cyclone was devoid of deep convection on September 5, and Elida dissipated the next day.

During Elida's passage, the storm killed 6 people offshore and affected more than 1,200 people. Moderate to heavy rains fell in association with the tropical cyclone across southwest Mexico and the Baja California Peninsula. The highest rainfall total was in San Marcos – Compostela in southwest mainland Mexico, which measured 6.60 in (168 mm), and a maximum for Baja California of 3.88 in (99 mm) at La Poza Honda – Comondu. Socorro Island was also affected. Ports on the Baja California coast had to close down due to Elida's 7-foot waves.

=== Hurricane Fausto ===
- Category 3 hurricane (SSHWS)
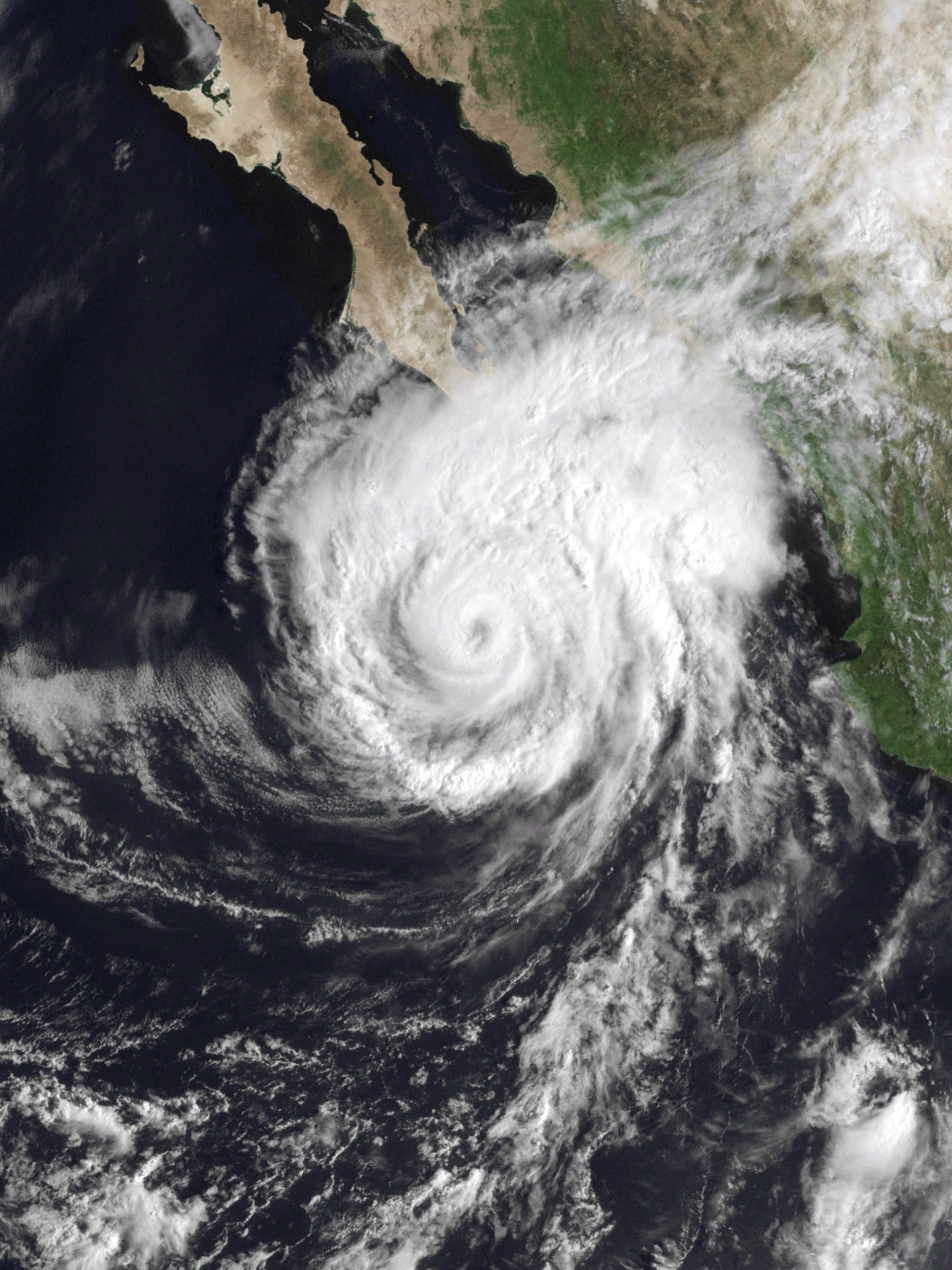
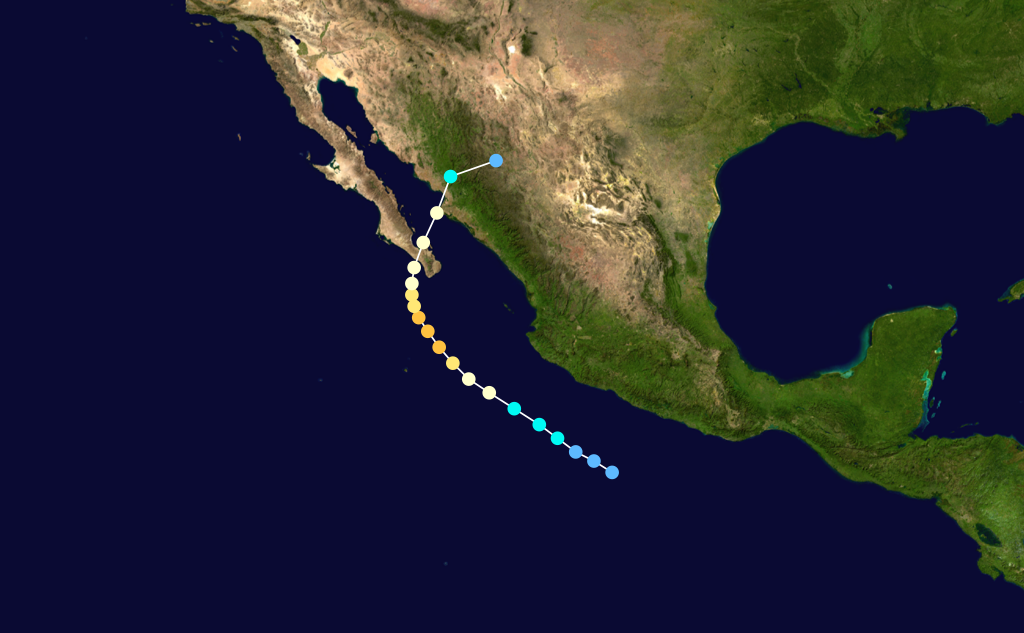
- Duration: September 10 – September 14
- Peak intensity: 120 mph (195 km/h) (1-min); 955 mbar (hPa)

A tropical wave, possibly the same that spawned Atlantic Hurricane Fran, crossed Central America on September 4. The disturbed weather moved northwestward off the west coast of Mexico. On September 9, the system became more organized, and on the next day, it developed into a tropical depression about 225 mi (360 km) southwest of Acapulco. The depression quickly strengthened into Tropical Storm Fausto, as it developed banding features and an eye. On September 11, Fausto attained hurricane status, becoming a major hurricane the next day. Fausto reached peak winds of 120 mph (195 km/h) on September 12, before weakening as it moved northward. It made landfall near Todos Santos, Baja California Sur, on September 13 with winds of 85 (140 km/h). It turned to the north-northeast and crossed the Gulf of California, before making a second and final landfall near Los Mochis, Sinaloa. Weakening rapidly over land, Fausto's surface circulation dissipated at 00:00 UTC on September 1, over the Sierra Madre mountains. Fausto's remnants continued to the east, across Mexico and the Gulf of Mexico. The remnants later developed into a nor'easter off the coast of the Delmarva Peninsula. The system was last noted a day later after it passed east of Cape Cod, Massachusetts.

Hurricane warnings were issued for the southern part of Baja California. Fourteen ports throughout Mexico were closed due to the storm. An estimated 5,000 residents evacuated to 110 shelters set up by officials. Following the substantial loss of life due to Hurricane Ismael in 1995, port officials urged, and sometimes pressured, to return to port. Many flights were canceled. Waves of up to 15 feet (4.6 m) walloped Pacific beaches along the southern tip of Baja California Sur and yachts were damaged. Rainfall peaked at 18.50 inches/470 mm at San Vicente de la Sierra. There was one casualty, a San Diego vacationier, who died by a downed power line. Overall damage in Mexico was minor, reaching $800,000 (1996 USD) in both Baja California and the mainland in Mexico. Fausto downed power poles, smashed windows, and disrupted the tourist business at Cabo San Lucas and La Paz. The storm damaged 1,700 homes in Mexico.

=== Tropical Depression One-C ===
- Tropical depression (SSHWS)
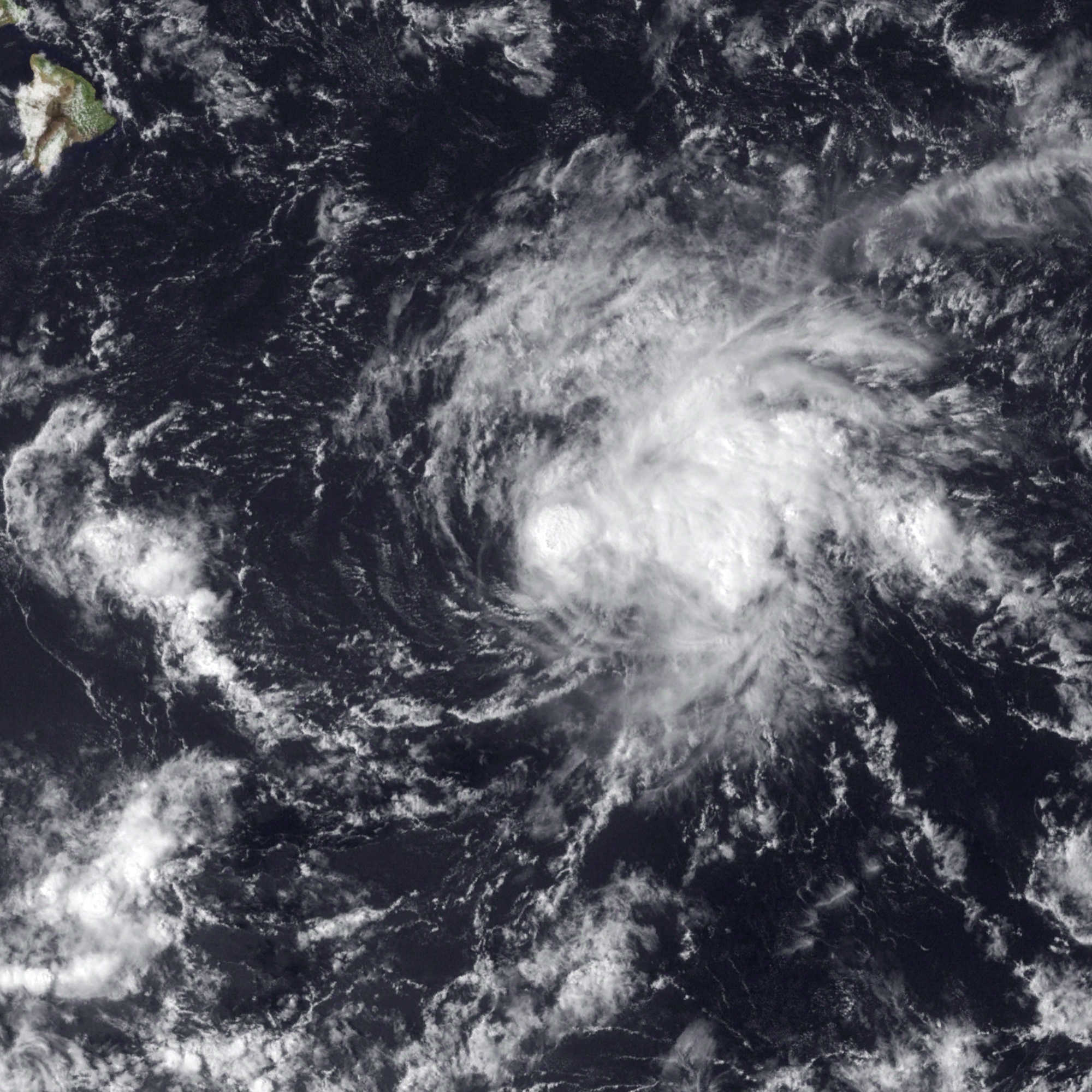
- Duration: September 15 – September 20
- Peak intensity: 35 mph (55 km/h) (1-min);

A tropical disturbance organized into a tropical depression on September 15. It headed west until September 17. That day, it turned to the west for two days before heading back west-northwest on September 19. It soon began to weaken and dissipated the next day. At its most intense, Tropical Depression One-C had winds of 35 mph (56 km/h).

=== Tropical Storm Genevieve ===
- Tropical storm (SSHWS)
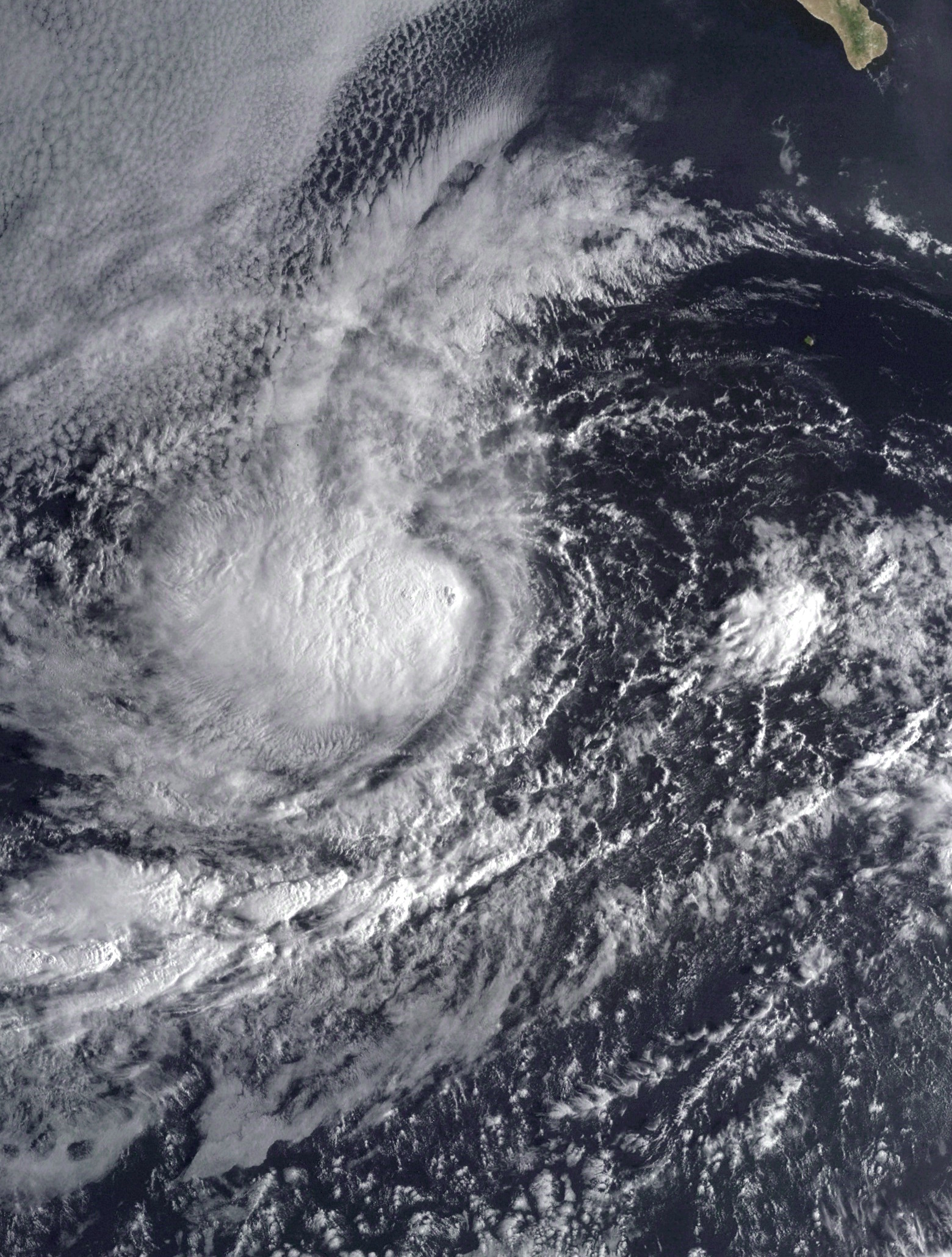
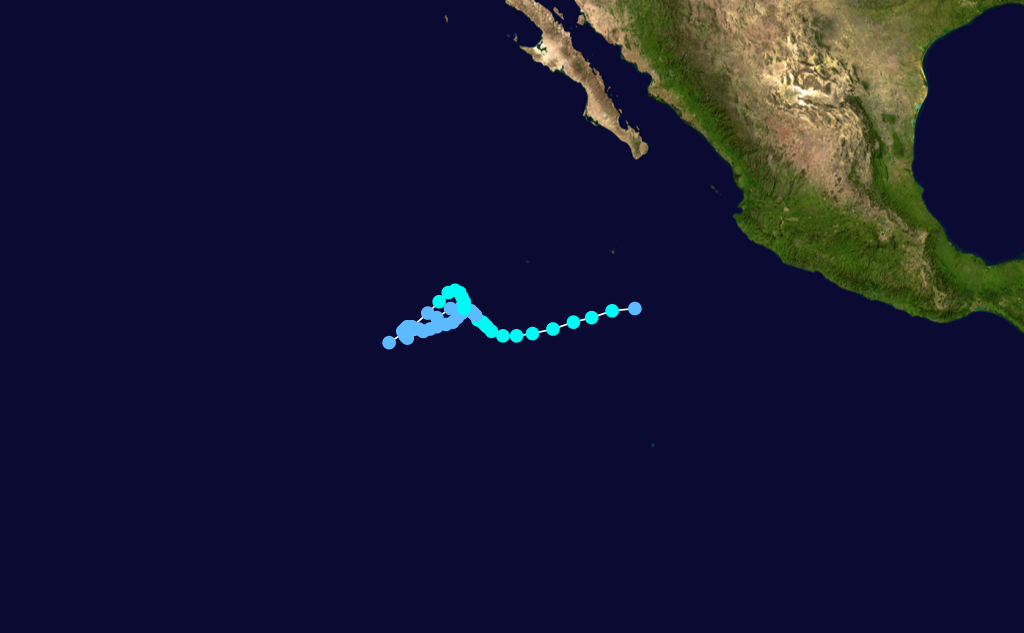
- Duration: September 27 – October 9
- Peak intensity: 50 mph (85 km/h) (1-min); 999 mbar (hPa)

In the Gulf of Tehuantepec, an area of disturbed weather containing convection formed on September 23. It moved westward without incident until September 27, when it developed stronger convection and became Tropical Depression Ten-E. Immediately thereafter, it strengthened into a tropical storm and was named Genevieve while it continued its westward track. Genevieve slowly got better organized, and reached its peak intensity of 999 mbar (29.5 inHg) and 50 mph (80 km/h) on September 29. The tropical storm then turned to the west-southwest as steering currents collapsed. The cyclone began a time of erratic motion, which included two loops. The erratic motion also exposed Genevieve to wind shear, and the tropical storm weakened to a tropical depression on October 1. On October 6, the shear temporarily weakened, and Tropical Depression Genevieve restrengthened into a tropical storm. The cyclone's wandering continued, and it entrained dry air. This dry air weakened the system to a depression for a second time on October 8, and Genevieve dissipated the next day. Brief flare-ups of convection could still be seen for a few days thereafter.

=== Hurricane Hernan ===
- Category 1 hurricane (SSHWS)
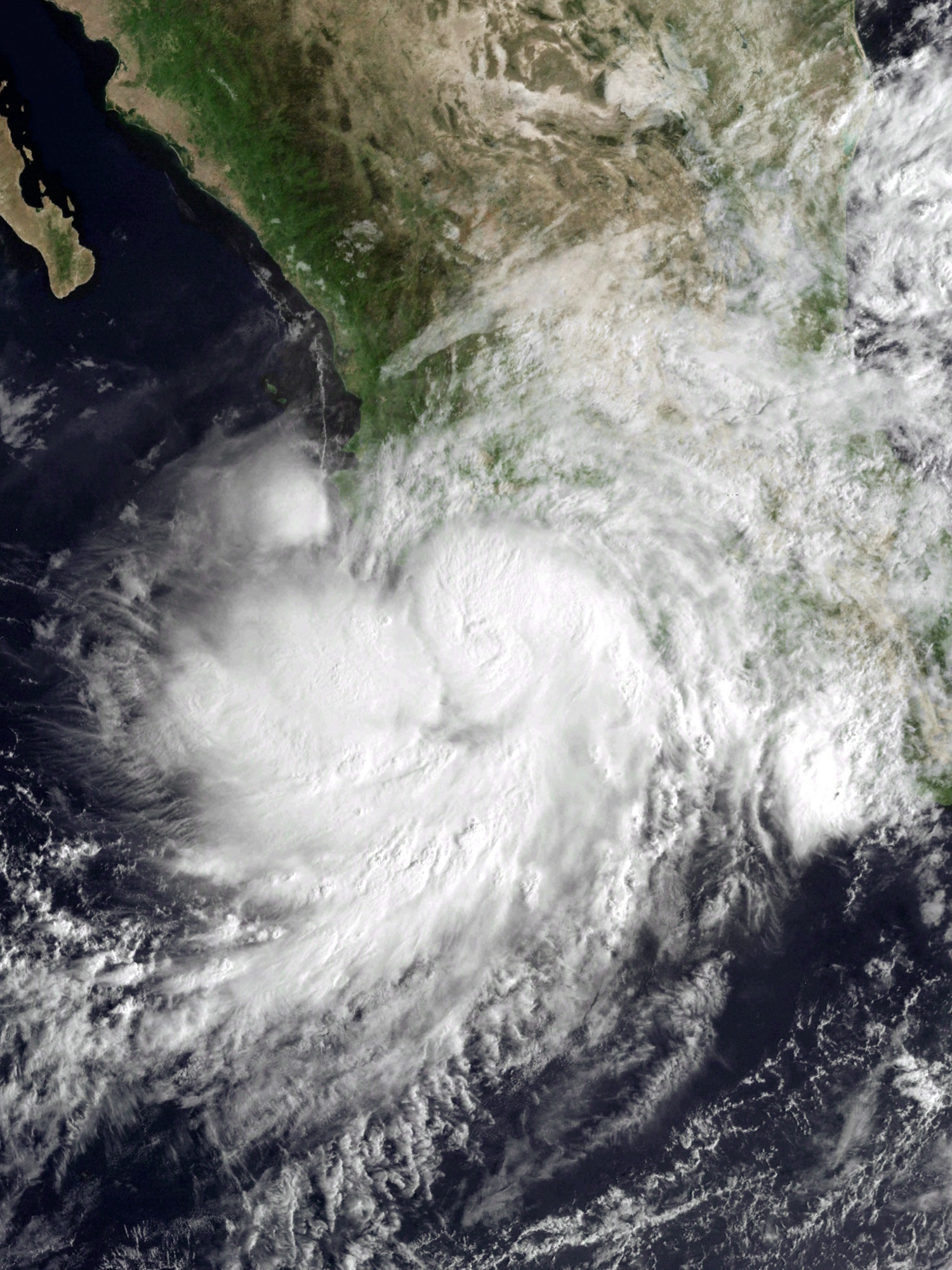
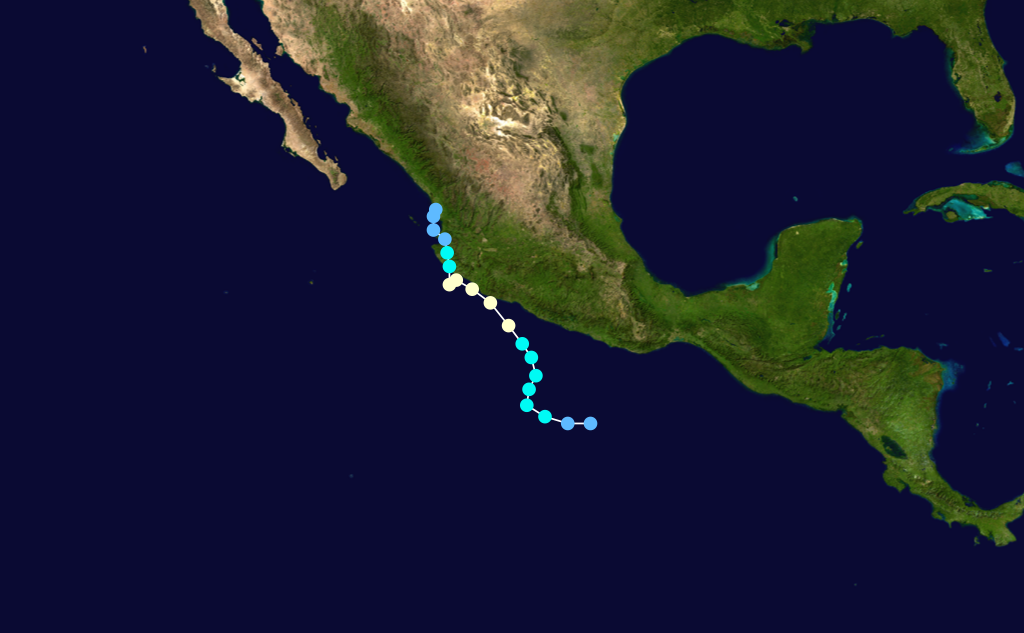
- Duration: September 30 – October 4
- Peak intensity: 85 mph (140 km/h) (1-min); 980 mbar (hPa)

In mid-September, a tropical wave crossed the Atlantic Ocean and entered the eastern Pacific, entering the Gulf of Tehuantepec on September 28. Deep convection consolidated and organized, leading to the formation of Tropical Depression Eleven-E early on September 30. It was located 285 mi (460 km) south-southeast of Acapulco, in an area with warm water temperatures. The outflow became well-established, and the depression quickly strengthened into Tropical Storm Hernan. The circulation redeveloped, and the thunderstorms developed an eye in the center. Early on October 2, Hernan attained hurricane status, and later that day reached peak winds of 85 mph (140 km/h) and a minimum pressure of 980 mbar (hPa, 28.94 inHg). The eye began affecting western Mexico and became less distinct. Hernan executed a small cyclonic loop offshore Manzanillo, before making landfall near Barra de Navidad on October 3, with winds of 75 mph (120 km/h). It weakened inland, falling to tropical depression status by 00:00 UTC on October 4. Shortly thereafter, Hernan re-emerged into the Pacific Ocean. Hernan weakened further as a large portion of its circulation remained on land, while the low-level center became difficult to locate. It dissipated while moving over Nayarit on October 4.

Hernan led to hurricane warnings for southwestern Mexico. Much of Jalisco was drenched with rain for nearly 12 consecutive hours, resulting in flooding. Country-wide; however, the highest total was recorded in Petacalco and La Union, with 21.8 in (550 mm) being measured at both locations. The National Water Commission reported waves of up to 14 ft (4.3 m). Along the coasts of Colima and Jalisco, waves caused by Hernan were not as large, reaching 13 ft (3.9 m) in height. High winds were also recorded. A boy was swept away in the Uxpana River and was reported missing. Due to flooding caused by the storm, three rivers in Veracruz overflowed their banks. Flooding from the storm also washed-out portions of two Mexico highways. Furthermore, telephone service was interrupted and power outages occurred. Around 1,000 homes were damaged or destroyed and 100 people were injured.

=== Tropical Depression Twelve-E ===
- Tropical depression (SSHWS)
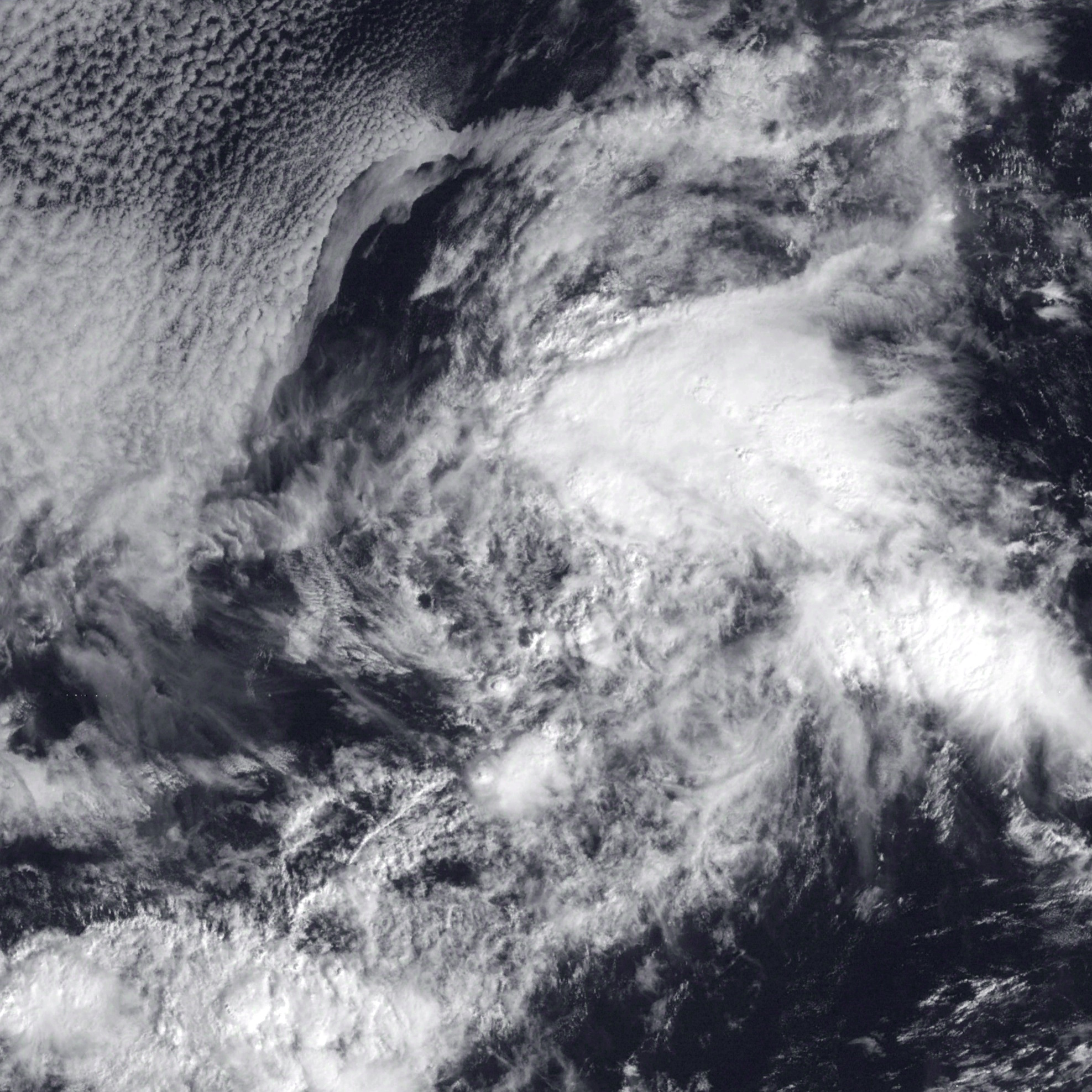
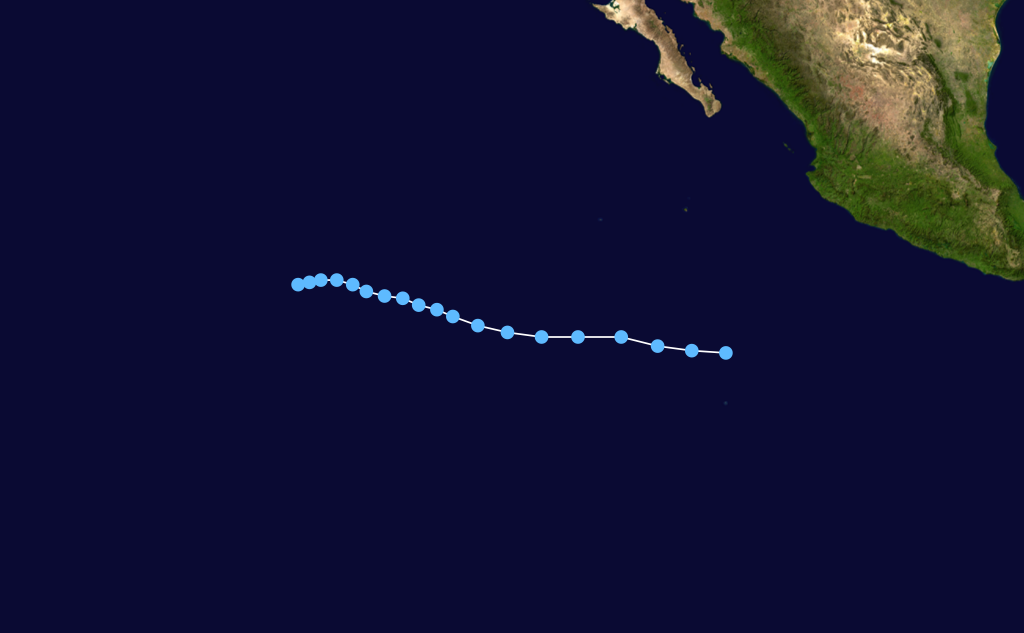
- Duration: November 7 – November 11
- Peak intensity: 35 mph (55 km/h) (1-min); 1003 mbar (hPa)

A system acquired enough convection and became organized enough to be considered a tropical depression on November 7. Although the environment was initially favourable and the system was almost upgraded into a tropical storm as was forecast, wind shear kept the cyclone weak. Its convection was eventually destroyed, and the depression dissipated on November 11.

== Storm names ==
The following list of names was used for named storms that formed in the North Pacific Ocean east of 140°W in 1996. This is the same list used for the 1990 season, except for Winnie, which had been interchanged with Wallis. No names were retired following the season, and so it was used again for the 2002 season.

- Alma
- Boris
- Cristina
- Douglas
- Elida
- Fausto
- Genevieve
- Hernan
- Iselle (unused)
- Julio (unused)
- Kenna (unused)
- Lowell (unused)
- Marie (unused)
- Norbert (unused)
- Odile (unused)
- Polo (unused)
- Rachel (unused)
- Simon (unused)
- Trudy (unused)
- Vance (unused)
- Winnie (unused)
- Xavier (unused)
- Yolanda (unused)
- Zeke (unused)

For storms that form in the North Pacific from 140°W to the International Date Line, the names come from a series of four rotating lists. Names are used one after the other without regard to year, and when the bottom of one list is reached, the next named storm receives the name at the top of the next list. No named storms formed in or crossed into the area in 1996.

== Season effects ==
This is a table of all of the storms that formed in the 1996 Pacific hurricane season. It includes their name, duration (within the basin), peak classification and intensities, areas affected, damage, and death totals. Deaths in parentheses are additional and indirect (an example of an indirect death would be a traffic accident), but were still related to that storm. Damage and deaths include totals while the storm was extratropical, a wave, or a low, and all of the damage figures are in 1996 USD.

Saffir–Simpson scale
TD	TS	C1	C2	C3	C4	C5

1996 Pacific tropical cyclone season statistics
Storm name	Dates active	Storm category at peak intensity	Max 1-min wind mph (km/h)	Min. press. (mbar)	Areas affected	Damage (US$)	Deaths	Ref(s).
Unnamed	May 13–16	Tropical storm	50 (85)	1000	None	None	None	
Two-E	May 15–19	Tropical depression	35 (55)	1006	None	None	None	
Alma	June 20–27	Category 2 hurricane	105 (165)	969	Southwestern Mexico, Revillagigedo Islands	Unknown	20	
Boris	June 27 – July 1	Category 1 hurricane	90 (150)	979	Southwestern Mexico, Western Mexico	Unknown	10	
Cristina	July 1–3	Tropical storm	70 (110)	991	Central America, Southwestern Mexico	Unknown	13	
Six-E	July 4–6	Tropical depression	35 (55)	1003	None	None	None	
Douglas	July 29 – August 6	Category 4 hurricane	130 (215)	946	None (after crossover)	None	None	
Seventeen-W	August 14–15	Tropical depression	35 (55)	1000	None (after crossover)	None	None	
Dolly	August 24–25	Tropical depression	25 (35)	1005	None (after crossover)	None	None	
Elida	August 30 – September 6	Tropical storm	65 (100)	994	Revillagigedo Islands, Baja California Peninsula	Minimal	6	
Fausto	September 10–14	Category 3 hurricane	120 (195)	955	Baja California Peninsula, Revillagigedo Islands, Northwest Mexico	$800,000	0 (1)	
One-C	September 15–20	Tropical depression	35 (55)	1007	Hawaiian Islands	None	None	
Genevieve	September 27 – October 9	Tropical storm	50 (85)	999	None	None	None	
Hernan	September 30 – October 4	Category 1 hurricane	85 (140)	980	Southwestern Mexico, Western Mexico, Texas	Unknown	1 (1)	
Twelve-E	November 7–11	Tropical depression	35 (55)	1003	None	None	None	
Season aggregates
15 systems	May 13 – November 11		130 (215)	946		>$800,000	44 (2)	

== See also ==
- List of Pacific hurricanes
- Pacific hurricane season
- 1996 Atlantic hurricane season
- 1996 Pacific typhoon season
- 1996 North Indian Ocean cyclone season
- South-West Indian Ocean cyclone seasons: 1995–96, 1996–97
- Australian region cyclone seasons: 1995–96, 1996–97
- South Pacific cyclone seasons: 1995–96, 1996–97
