= Hurricane Cesar–Douglas =

Category 4 Atlantic and Pacific hurricane in 1996

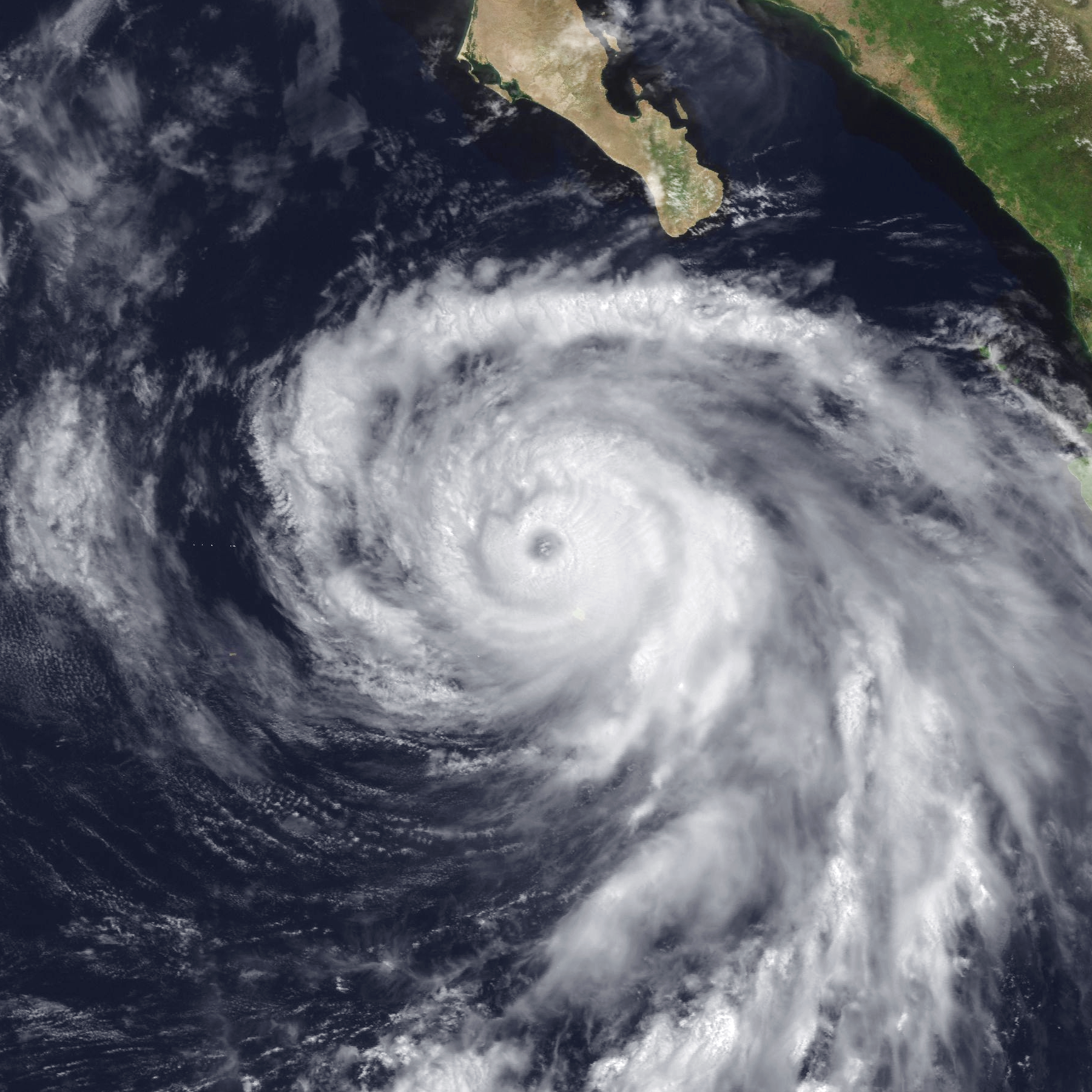
- Hurricane Douglas near peak intensity on August 1

Meteorological history
- Formed: July 24, 1996
- Dissipated: August 6, 1996

Category 4 major hurricane
- 1-minute sustained (SSHWS/NWS)
- Highest winds: 130 mph (215 km/h)
- Lowest pressure: 946 mbar (hPa); 27.94 inHg

Overall effects
- Fatalities: 116 total (Note: 114 as Cesar, 2 as Douglas)
- Missing: 29
- Damage: $203 million (1996 USD)
- Areas affected: Leeward Antilles, Venezuela, Colombia, Nicaragua, Costa Rica, Honduras, El Salvador, Guatemala, Mexico
- IBTrACS / IBTrACS: Cesar, Douglas
- Part of the 1996 Atlantic and Pacific hurricane seasons

Hurricane Cesar–Douglas was one of the few tropical cyclones to survive the crossover from the Atlantic to east Pacific basin, and was the last to receive a new storm name upon doing so. Hurricane Cesar was the third named storm and second hurricane of the 1996 Atlantic hurricane season. The system formed in the southern Caribbean Sea and affected Venezuela and Colombia before crossing Nicaragua and entering the Eastern Pacific where it was renamed Hurricane Douglas, the fourth named storm, third hurricane, and first and strongest major hurricane of the 1996 Pacific hurricane season. Cesar developed from a tropical wave off the coast of Venezuela on July 24. Initially a tropical depression, it strengthened to a tropical storm eighteen hours later. Cesar attained hurricane status on July 27, about halfway between Nicaragua and Colombia. On July 28, Hurricane Cesar made landfall just north of Bluefields, Nicaragua, weakening to tropical storm status. Cesar emerged into the eastern Pacific Ocean on July 29. Upon reaching the Pacific, the system was renamed Tropical Depression Seven-E, but in post-analysis it was determined the cyclone retained tropical storm status while crossing Central America. At the time, the agreement through the World Meteorological Organization was for storms to be renamed if they crossed from the Atlantic to the Pacific, resulti. This made Cesar the most recent tropical cyclone to traverse from the Atlantic to east Pacific basin until Hurricane Otto achieved the same feat in 2016.

On July 29, Douglas attained hurricane status southwest of the Guatemala/Mexico border. On July 31, Douglas attained major hurricane status, or a Category 3 on the Saffir–Simpson scale, and by early on August 1, Douglas reached peak winds of 130 mph (210 km/h), equivalent to a low end Category 4. Later that day, the hurricane attained its lowest pressure of 946 mbar, about 275 miles (443 km) south of the southern tip of the Baja California peninsula. Douglas maintained peak intensity for 36 hours until it began to weaken on August 2. On August 3, the hurricane deteriorated to tropical storm status and weakened to tropical depression status on August 5. By August 6, Douglas could no longer be classified as a tropical cyclone. The remnant circulation continued westward for several days.

In Nicaragua, the storm wrought about $50.5 million in losses. More than 2,500 homes, 39 bridges and 25 miles (40 km) of roads were destroyed. The storm killed 42 people and left an estimated 100,000 homeless in Nicaragua. In Costa Rica, river flooding damaged or destroyed 3,874 homes; 150 bridges were also destroyed. The road network was significantly damaged. Across the country, at least 39 people were killed and damage amounted to $151 million. Additionally, 12 people died in El Salvador. Hurricane Douglas brought up to 6 in (150 mm) of rain on the south coast of Mexico and resulted in a 4-ft (1.2-m) storm surge. Two deaths by drowning were reported. Overall, Cesar–Douglas caused 116 deaths and $203 million in damage.

== Meteorological history ==
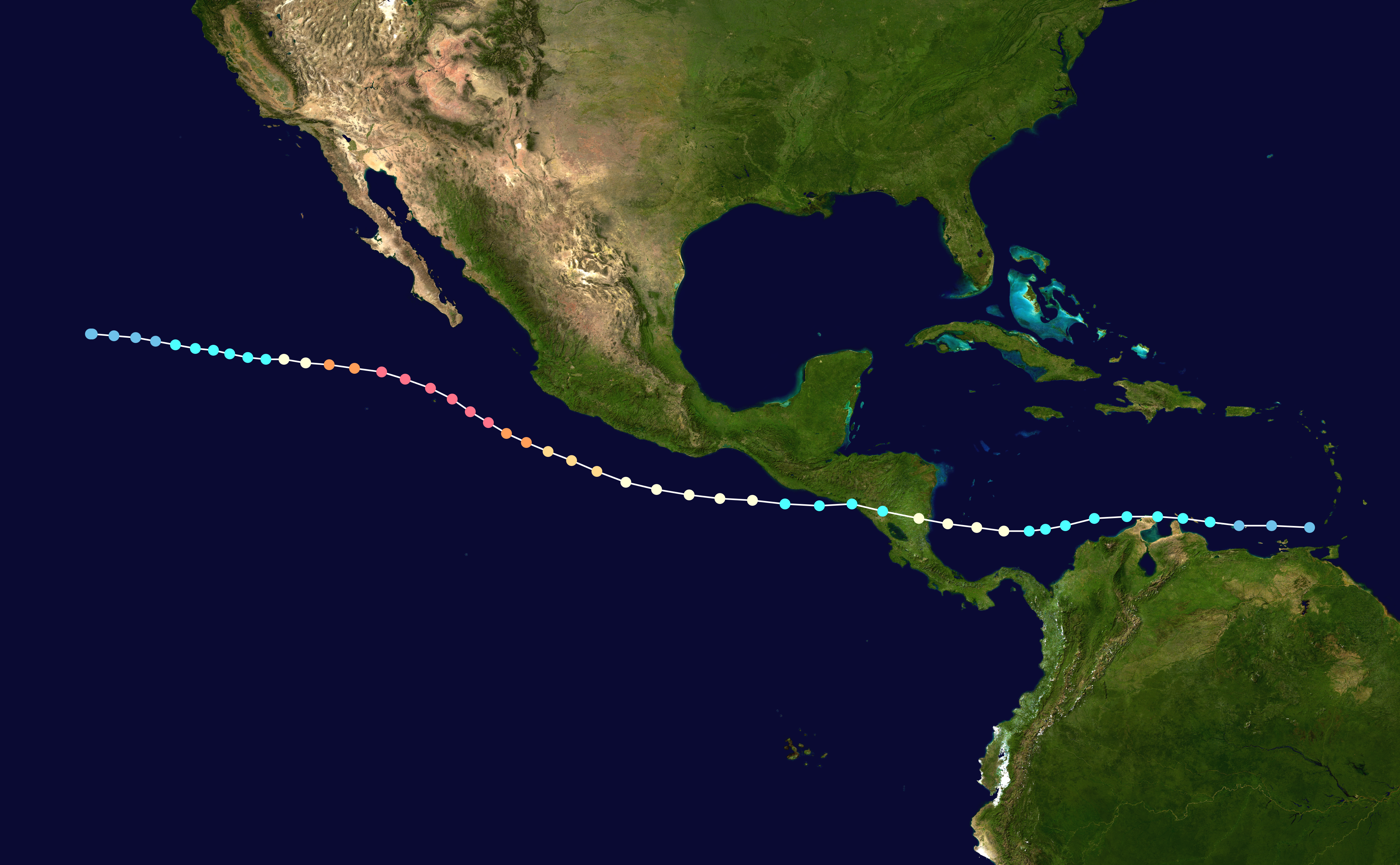
Map plotting the storm's track and intensity, according to the Saffir–Simpson scale Map key Saffir–Simpson scale Tropical depression (≤38 mph, ≤62 km/h) Tropical storm (39–73 mph, 63–118 km/h) Category 1 (74–95 mph, 119–153 km/h) Category 2 (96–110 mph, 154–177 km/h) Category 3 (111–129 mph, 178–208 km/h) Category 4 (130–156 mph, 209–251 km/h) Category 5 (≥157 mph, ≥252 km/h) Unknown Storm type Tropical cyclone Subtropical cyclone Extratropical cyclone, remnant low, tropical disturbance, or monsoon depression

The origins of Hurricane Cesar were from a tropical wave and an elongated area of low-pressure that emerged into the Atlantic from the west coast of Africa on July 17. For several days, the wave moved westward without any organization, although an anticyclone aloft provided conditions favorable for development. On July 22, convection, or thunderstorms, increased along the wave as it approached the southern Windward Islands. Surface pressure steadily dropped as the system moved through the Lesser Antilles, and a circulation began developing near Trinidad and Tobago. Based on surface and satellite data, it is estimated the system developed into Tropical Depression Three at 18:00 UTC on July 24 near Isla Margarita, off the north coast of Venezuela. Operationally, the National Hurricane Center (NHC) did not consider it as a tropical depression until 18 hours later.

With an unusually strong high pressure area located over The Bahamas, the tropical depression moved westward through the southern Caribbean near the northern coast of South America. Around 1200 UTC on July 25, it struck the island of Curaçao, which reported sustained winds of 45 mph (72 km/h). The observation indicated the depression attained tropical storm status, although operationally the depression wasn't upgraded until the next day, at which point the NHC named the storm Cesar. After crossing Curaçao, the storm moved near or over Guajira Peninsula in extreme northern Colombia. Its proximity to South America prevented significant strengthening, until late on July 26 when the storm reached the open waters of the southwest Caribbean Sea.

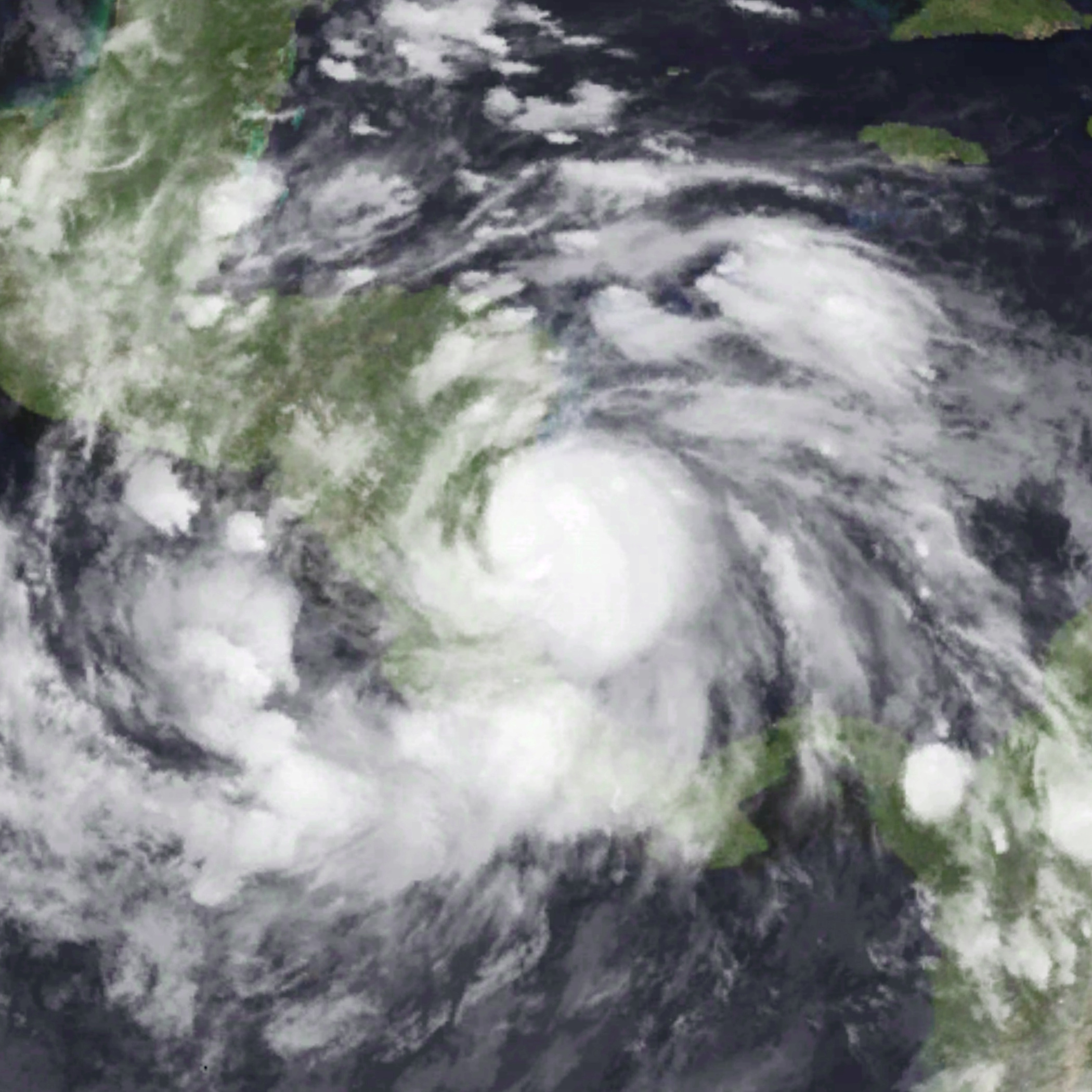
Hurricane Cesar making landfall in Nicaragua on July 27

On July 27, Cesar attained hurricane status about halfway between Nicaragua and Colombia. Later that day, the hurricane passed over San Andrés island. As Cesar approached Central America, a 17-mile (27 km) eye formed, surrounded by deep convection in the form of an eyewall. At about 0400 UTC on July 28, Hurricane Cesar made landfall just north of Bluefields, Nicaragua with winds of 75 mph (121 km/h). It moved quickly west-northward through the country, weakening to tropical storm status and emerging into the eastern Pacific Ocean by July 2 9. This made Cesar the most recent tropical cyclone to traverse from the Atlantic to east Pacific basin until Hurricane Otto achieved the same feat in 2016. In addition, following the dissipation of Cesar–Douglas there was a policy change which determined that future storms would retain their original name upon crossing into another basin. Upon reaching the Pacific, the system was renamed Tropical Depression Seven-E, but in a post-analysis it was determined the cyclone remained a tropical storm status while crossing Central America. Once its status as a tropical storm was determined operationally, it was named Tropical Storm Douglas. At the time, the agreement through the World Meteorological Organization was for storms to be renamed if they crossed from the Atlantic to the Pacific.

As the storm moved westward, it quickly intensified, with an eye-like feature developing by 09:00 UTC on July 29. Shortly thereafter, Douglas attained hurricane status about 115 mi (185 km) southwest of the Guatemala/Mexico border. Around that time, tropical cyclone prediction models anticipated two scenarios for the future of Douglas; one was a northwest track to make landfall near Acapulco, and the other was a continued west-northwest track while remaining offshore. Hurricane Douglas ultimately took the latter track. By late on July 29, the eye of the hurricane was well-defined on Mexican radar, and with favorable upper-level outflow, warm sea surface temperatures, and a climatologically favorable region for intense hurricanes, the NHC forecast Douglas to strengthen to winds of 115 mph (185 km/h). The next day, its structure became atypical of a strengthening hurricane, and the eye was briefly not seen on satellite imagery.

On July 31, Douglas became much better organized as it turned more west-northwestward, and it attained major hurricane status, or a Category 3 on the Saffir–Simpson scale, about 205 miles (330 km) southwest of Manzanillo. By early on August 1, Douglas reached peak winds of 130 mph (210 km/h), equivalent to a low end Category 4. Later that day, the hurricane attained its lowest pressure of 946 mbar, about 275 miles (443 km) south of the southern tip of the Baja California peninsula. Douglas maintained peak intensity for 36 hours, until August 2 when the eye became less-organized as the overall convection began to weaken. Weakening continued due to cooler waters as Douglas turned to the west, and on August 3 the hurricane deteriorated to tropical storm status. As a tropical storm, there was minimal deep convection, although the center remained very well-defined. On August 5, Douglas weakened to tropical depression status, and by the next day could no longer be classified as a tropical cyclone. The remnant circulation continued westward for several days.

== Preparations ==
Prior to Cesar's arrival in Venezuela, a tropical storm warning was issued for areas west of La Vela de Coro to the border with Colombia; the warning was discontinued later that day. The government of Colombia issued a tropical storm warning on July 25 from the border with Venezuela to Barranquilla as well as the islands of Aruba and Curaçao. These warnings were discontinued later that day after the storm's passage.

As Cesar approached Central America, hurricane warnings were posted in Nicaragua 31 hours before landfall, leaving ample time to prepare for the hurricane. With Hurricane Joan occurring only 8 years prior, 10,724 people were evacuated before and during the hurricane to take refuge at special camps.

On July 29, shortly after Cesar emerged into the Pacific Ocean and was reclassified Tropical Depression Seven-E, the government of Mexico issued a tropical storm watch from Puerto Madero to Acapulco. About 12 hours later, after the depression intensified into Tropical Storm Douglas, the Mexican government canceled the watch and issued a new tropical storm warning from Salina Cruz to Acapulco; this was due to the large extent of tropical storm force winds associated with Douglas and its proximity to the south coast of Mexico. Another tropical storm watch was briefly issued on July 30 from Acapulco to Manzanillo.

== Impact ==
Impact by Country
Country	Deaths	Missing	Damage	Sources
Colombia	14	0	$440,000	
Curaçao	1	0	Unknown	
Costa Rica	39	29	$151 million	
El Salvador	13	0	$10,000	
Guatemala	0	0	$500,000	
Honduras	0	0	$500,000	
Mexico	2	0	$10,000	
Nicaragua	42	0	$50.5 million	
Venezuela	5	0	Unknown	
Total	116	29	$202.96 million	

Hurricane Cesar was a moisture-laden tropical cyclone that dropped heavy rains along its path through the southern Caribbean Sea and Central America. Damage was moderate to extreme due to mudslides and flooding, and at least 116 people were killed.

=== Lesser Antilles and South America ===
The precursor tropical wave to Cesar produced rains and gusty winds through a large portion of the Lesser Antilles. In Venezuela, heavy rains from the storm triggered flooding and landslides that killed at least five people. In the capital city of Caracas, 45 people were left homeless as a result of the storm. Although the storm passed directly over the region, the ABC islands off the coast of Colombia and Venezuela received little rainfall, peaking at 0.15 in (3.8 mm) on Curaçao. Peak gusts were also measured at 60 mph (97 km/h) on the island. The winds caused minor damage to roofs and trees across all three islands, as well as rough surf that drowned one person in Curaçao.

As a tropical storm, Cesar struck the northern coastline of Colombia, bringing heavy rains and gusty winds. At least three people were killed in storm related incidents, two of which occurred when an avalanche buried a house in Pueblo Bello in the northern part of the country. Cesar brought torrential rains to the Archipelago of San Andrés, Providencia and Santa Catalina offshore eastern Nicaragua. Eleven people were killed across the archipelago, including eight children who died in a landslide. Across the islands, 60 homes lost their roofs and numerous trees were felled due to high winds. The local governor stated that losses from Cesar reached 800 million COP ($440,00 USD).

=== Nicaragua ===
Torrential rainfall was the immediate effect of Cesar, peaking at 10.7 inches (270 mm) at Bluefields and with many other locations reporting over 6 inches (150 mm). The intense precipitation led to widespread mudslides and overflown rivers across the mountainous country. The most affected region was Lake Managua where the water level was approaching dangerous levels. The storm wrought extensive damage throughout the country, leaving roughly $50.5 million in damage behind. Large portions of the country's crops were affected, resulting in a food shortage following the hurricane. According to Nicaraguan officials, more than 2,500 homes, 39 bridges and 40 km (25 mi) of road were destroyed by Cesar. In all, the storm killed 42 people and left an estimated 100,000 homeless.

=== Costa Rica ===
Like Nicaragua, Costa Rica received heavy rainfall from Cesar, leading to mudslides and widespread flooding. River flooding damaged 51 houses and washed away 213 more; 72 bridges were also destroyed. The road network was significantly damaged. Costa Rica requested international aid subsequent to the storm. Across the country, at least 39 people were killed and damage amounted to $151 million. Additionally, 29 people were listed as missing.

=== El Salvador ===
As Cesar continued westward, it produced heavy flooding and mudslides in western El Salvador, killing 9 in the community of José Cecilio del Valle. Four others drowned in other parts of the country.

=== Mexico ===
Hurricane Douglas brought up to 6 inches (150 mm) of rain on the south coast of Mexico and resulted in a 4-foot (1.2 m) storm surge. Two deaths by drowning were reported in Cabo San Lucas.

== Retirement ==
The name Cesar was retired in spring of 1997, and will not be used again in the Atlantic basin. It was replaced with Cristobal for the 2002 season. As the system had little impact on land while named Douglas, that name was not retired from the Eastern Pacific rotating name lists, and so was used again.

== See also ==
- List of Atlantic–Pacific crossover hurricanes
- Other storms named Douglas
- List of Category 1 Atlantic hurricanes
- List of Category 4 Pacific hurricanes
- Hurricane Irene–Olivia (1971)
- Hurricane Joan–Miriam (1988)
- Tropical Storm Bret (1993)
- Hurricane Bonnie (2022)
- Hurricane Julia (2022)
