= List of storms named Douglas =

The name Douglas has been used for eight tropical cyclones in the East Pacific Ocean:

- Hurricane Douglas (1984) – a Category 4 hurricane that never threatened land
- Tropical Storm Douglas (1990) – killed one person in Mexico, where it nearly made landfall
- Hurricane Douglas (1996) – a Category 4 hurricane; continuation of Hurricane Cesar in the Atlantic, crossed Central America and became Hurricane Douglas
- Hurricane Douglas (2002) – a Category 2 hurricane that never threatened land
- Tropical Storm Douglas (2008) – passed near Mexico, brought minor flooding to some areas
- Tropical Storm Douglas (2014) – never threatened land
- Hurricane Douglas (2020) – a Category 4 hurricane that passed very close to Hawaii at hurricane strength
- Tropical Storm Douglas (2026) – a weak tropical storm that never threatened land
