= 1996 Oman cyclone =

North Indian cyclone in 1996

Cyclone 02A
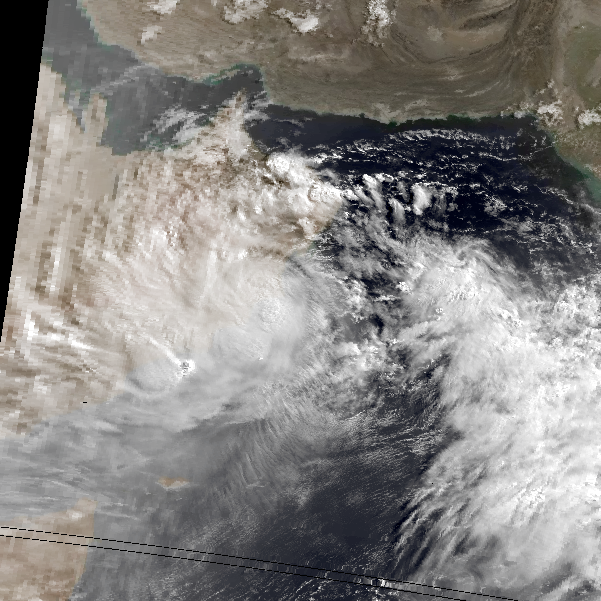
- Cyclone 02A approaching Oman on June 11

Meteorological history
- Formed: June 11, 1996
- Dissipated: June 12, 1996

Tropical storm
- 1-minute sustained (SSHWS/JTWC)
- Highest winds: 75 km/h (45 mph)
- Lowest pressure: 994 hPa (mbar); 29.35 inHg

Overall effects
- Fatalities: 341 total
- Damage: $1.2 billion (1996 USD)
- Areas affected: Oman, Yemen, Somalia
- Part of the 1996 North Indian Ocean cyclone season

The 1996 Oman cyclone (also known as Cyclone 02A) was a tenacious and deadly system that caused historic flooding in the southern Arabian Peninsula. It originated from a disturbance in the Gulf of Aden, the first such tropical cyclogenesis on record. After moving eastward, the system interacted with the monsoon trough and became a tropical storm on June 11. Later that day, it turned toward Oman and struck the country's southeast coast. It weakened over land, dissipating on June 12, although it continued to produce rainfall – heavy at times – over the next few days.

Offshore Oman, the storm's rough waves disabled an oil tanker and damaged a fishing boat, killing one person in the latter incident. Striking Oman, the storm produced significant rainfall totals well above the monthly average, peaking at 234 mm (9.2 in) in the Dhofar region. Strong winds where the storm moved ashore damaged buildings and the local water plant. The rains washed out roads and isolated villages, killing two people due to drowning in Al-Ghubra. However, the effects were more severe in Yemen, where the floods were considered the worst on record. The storm produced the heaviest rainfall in 70 years, reaching 189 mm (7.4 in) in Ma'rib. Flood waters washed away or damaged 1,068 km (664 mi) of roads and 21 bridges, some of them dating back 2,000 years to the Roman era. The storm washed away the topsoil or otherwise wrecked 42,800 ha (106,000 acres) of crop fields, accounting for US$100 million in agriculture damage. At least 1,820 houses were destroyed, many of them built on wadis, or dry river beds. Overall damage was estimated at US$1.2 billion, and there were 338 deaths in Yemen. The World Bank assisted in a project to rebuild the damaged infrastructure in Yemen and to mitigate against future floods.

== Meteorological history ==
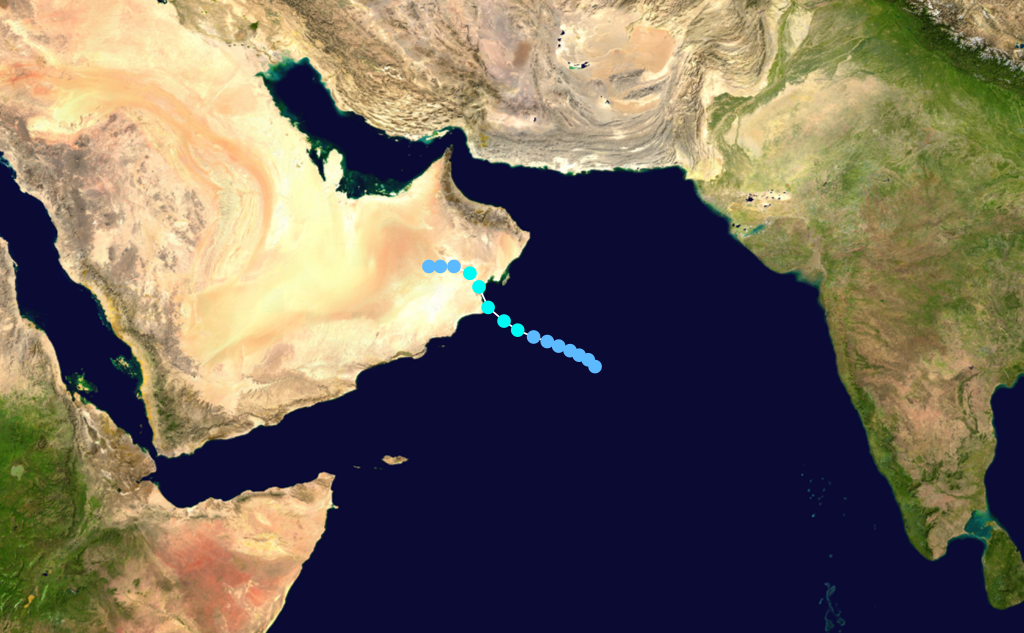
Map plotting the storm's track and intensity, according to the Saffir–Simpson scale Map key Saffir–Simpson scale Tropical depression (≤38 mph, ≤62 km/h) Tropical storm (39–73 mph, 63–118 km/h) Category 1 (74–95 mph, 119–153 km/h) Category 2 (96–110 mph, 154–177 km/h) Category 3 (111–129 mph, 178–208 km/h) Category 4 (130–156 mph, 209–251 km/h) Category 5 (≥157 mph, ≥252 km/h) Unknown Storm type Tropical cyclone Subtropical cyclone Extratropical cyclone, remnant low, tropical disturbance, or monsoon depression

On May 31, a weak circulation persisted over the warm waters of the Gulf of Aden between Yemen and Somalia. Its origins were unknown, possibly the convergence of the sea breeze along the coast of Somalia with the monsoon flow. The system produced convection, or thunderstorms, along both coasts of the body of water. As it moved east-northeastward along the coast of Yemen and Oman, the disturbance brought dry air from the north, which decreased the convection. It moved farther offshore on June 7 into the open Arabian Sea, where it interacted with the south-west monsoon and developed more convection.

The area of thunderstorms persisted about 1,480 km (920 mi) northeast of Somalia by June 9. It became circular as the circulation became more defined, fueled by the instability from the monsoon trough. Wind shear was expected to prevent significant development, although the system organized enough that the Joint Typhoon Warning Center issued a Tropical Cyclone Formation Alert on June 10. On the next day, the agency initiated advisories on Tropical Cyclone 02A about 160 km (100 mi) from the Oman coastline. This marked the first occasion that a tropical cyclone originated from a system in the Gulf of Aden.

After becoming a tropical storm, the system's structure became more aligned as it developed an anticyclone aloft. Fueled by water temperatures of 29 °C (84 °F), the cyclone intensified further. At 03:00 UTC on June 11, the Omani city of Fahud recorded sustained winds of 75 km/h (45 mph), and a station on Masirah Island recorded a pressure of 994 mbar (29.4 inHg). On this basis, the JTWC estimated that the storm attained peak winds of 75 km/h (45 mph). However, a nearby ship reported sustained winds of 85 km/h (55 mph), and the well-defined structure on satellite imagery suggested winds as strong as 120 km/h (75 mph). Moving northwestward, the cyclone made landfall around 09:00 UTC on June 11 about 130 km (80 mi) southwest of Masirah Island in southeastern Oman, at a location named Ras Madrakah. It quickly weakened over the desert terrain and dry air, and the circulation dissipated by June 12 over the central portion of the country. However, the remnants turned to the southwest, steered by a northerly flow. It entered the Rub' al Khali, or Empty Quarter, of Saudi Arabia late on June 12, and continued slowly westward. The storm's interaction with the monsoon brought the Intertropical Convergence Zone northward into Oman and Yemen, bringing unusually heavy rainfall until the system gradually wound down.

The IMD – the official warning agency for the basin (Note: The India Meteorological Department is the official Regional Specialized Meteorological Center for the northern Indian Ocean.) – did not track the cyclone. In general, tropical cyclone forecast models failed to predict that the storm would form.

== Impact ==
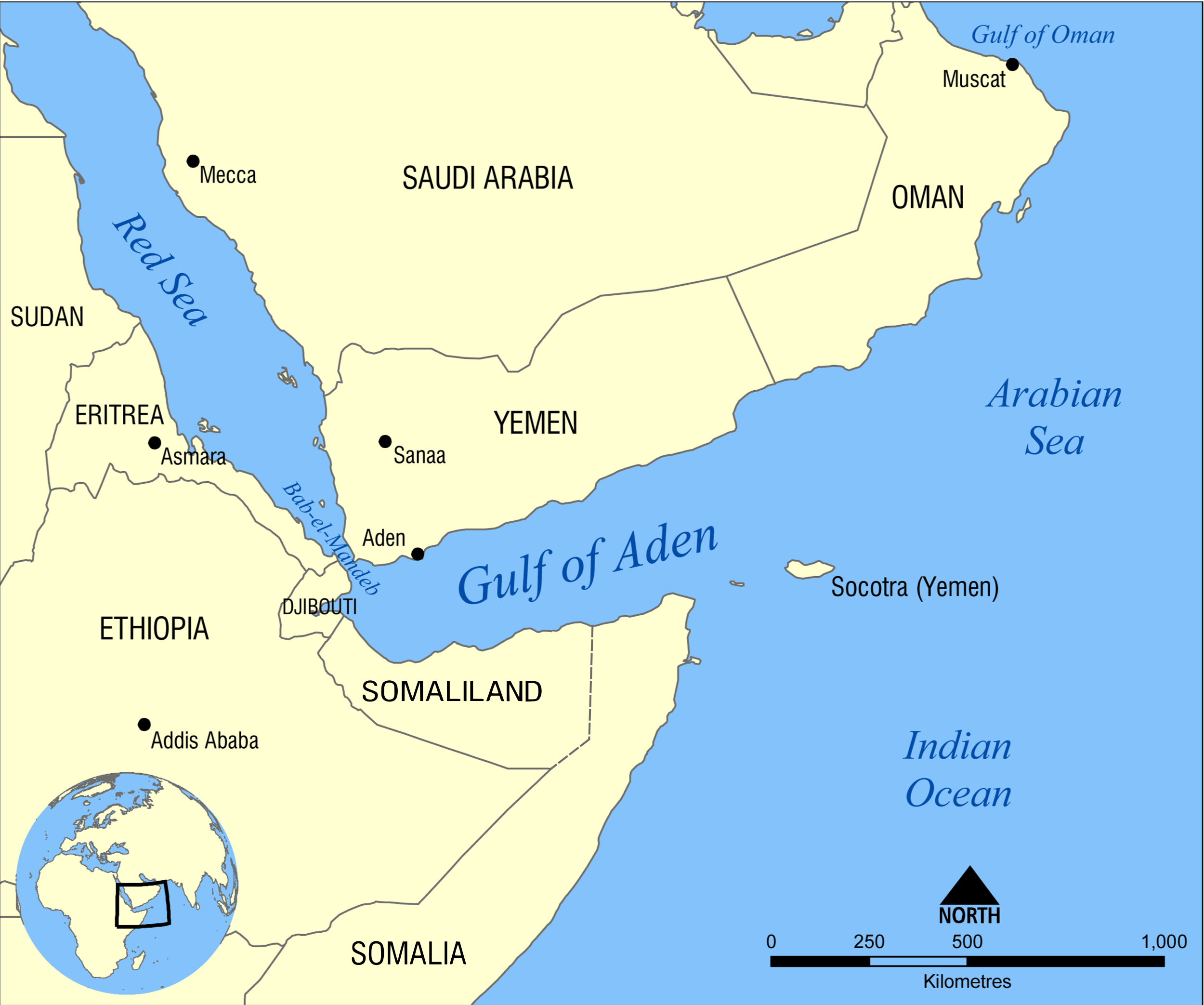
Map of the territories surrounding the Gulf of Aden that were affected by the cyclone

The precursor to the storm dropped heavy rainfall in Oman, reaching 29 mm (1.1 in) in Khaftawt on May 31. The storm later produced intense precipitation across the coast and desert regions of the country. Masirah recorded 48 mm (1.9 in) of rainfall over 36 hours, compared to their monthly average of 1 mm (0.039 in), while Salalah reported 36 mm (1.4 in), which was 600% of the average June rainfall. However, the heaviest rainfall occurred on June 11 and into the following day, when the system drew moisture into mountainous parts of the Dhofar region. The Jebel Ashor station recorded 234 mm (9.2 in) of rainfall over 48 hours, including 143 mm (5.6 in) on June 11. Farther north, heavy rainfall occurred in the Al Hajar Mountains, where 201 mm (7.9 in) was recorded, mostly over eight hours; there, 71.8 mm (2.83 in) of precipitation was recorded over two hours.

Offshore the Arabian Peninsula, the cyclone produced rough waves that disabled an oil tanker; the crew was rescued by the Omani Coast Guard after being stranded for a few days. A fishing boat was damaged after being washed ashore near Ras Madrakah, killing one person in the crew of nine. Near where the storm moved ashore, the storm's strong winds heavily damaged the village of Ras Madrakah. Considered the worst storm in memory, the cyclone wrecked workshops and buildings, including damaging the roof of the desalination plant, leaving residents without water for several days. Strong winds of over 93 km/h (58 mph) knocked down 20 trees in Rima that were planted to provide shade for government buildings. Across the storm's track through Oman, the rains replenished water levels in aquifers, while also washing out roads and isolating villages. This lack of transportation prevented prompt repair work. The Jiddat al-Harasis desert was flooded for over a month due to the storm, killing two people due to drowning in Al-Ghubra. The floods provided grazing for the endangered oryx population, although many livestock were killed. Three airports in the country were closed due to floods up to four days.

Damage was heaviest in Yemen, where the storm's remnants dropped the heaviest rainfall in 70 years. Ma'rib recorded 189 mm (7.4 in) of rainfall, and the capital Sana'a reported 164 mm (6.5 in) of precipitation. Widespread flooding affected much of Yemen, the worst on record for the country. Damage was heaviest in three governorates – Hadhramaut, Shabwah, and Ma'rib – with lesser effects in three other governorates. The waters washed away or damaged 1,068 km (664 mi) of roads and 21 bridges, including the primary road crossing Hadhramaut. Some of the damaged roads were built 2,000 years prior under the Roman Empire. Primary highways were damaged in 16 locations. Thousands of cars and other vehicles were inundated, necessitating boat travel to transport injured residents. About 2,300 m (7,500 ft) of power lines was cut. The floods washed away 113 power poles, and four main generators were affected, causing widespread outages. Storm debris contaminated also many drinking wells and damaged 1,357 water pumps damaged. About 80% of Shabwah Governorate lost water access, forcing some residents to drink from contaminated wadis, or formerly dry river beds. About one-third of gabions – structures to help with flood control – were damaged or destroyed, as were 634 dykes.

Many Yemeni villages were isolated, and the entirety of Ahwar and Qaishan provinces were inaccessible within Abyan Governorate. The floods destroyed 1,820 houses, many of them washed away, and many others were damaged, leaving 22,842 families homeless. The storm washed away the topsoil or otherwise wrecked 42,800 ha (106,000 acres) of crop fields. The storm also knocked over 37,000 fruit trees and killed 13,000 livestock, accounting for about US$100 million in agriculture damage. About 70% of arable land in Shabwah Governorate was washed away. The floods littered about 25 km (16 mi) of irrigation canals with sand. Many of the houses and fields were built on wadis which were swept away when water levels rose. The floods also damaged or destroyed 43 health facilities and 53 schools. Overall, 338 people were killed by the floods in Yemen, and damage was estimated at US$1.2 billion, according to the Centre for Research on the Epidemiology of Disasters. However, Yemen's General Secretariat for Natural Disasters and Relief estimated damage at US$200 million, which accounted for 12% of the country's GDP.

== Aftermath ==
After the worst of the floods ended, the Yemeni government created a Flood Relief High Committee to coordinate incoming aid and relief distribution. The Ministry of Health coordinated the transportation and storage of goods. Workers quickly repaired roads and airports. In Shabwah, CARE and Oxfam repaired damaged pumps and wells to restore access to clean water, and the German government sent a team to restore water access in Ma'rib Governorate. The widespread destruction of crop fields caused many tribes to abandon their ancestral land. Many of the residents left homeless either stayed with families or relatives, or resided in temporary shelters, where there were reports of malaria, typhoid, and diarrhea. The government provided building materials to rebuild houses. In the immediate aftermath, the local Red Cross chapter distributed about 1,300 blankets, 200 tents, and 200 sets of cooking tools. Stagnant waters in Yemen caused a locust outbreak in August 1996 that affected Saudi Arabia for the next three months. Officials used over 350,000 L (92,000 US gal) of pesticide in response to the outbreak. The heavy rural damage depressed the regional economy in 1996 and 1997.

On June 17, the government of Yemen issued an appeal for international aid, while also declaring four governorates as disaster areas. After the severe flooding occurred, 20 countries and various international organizations provided money or relief goods to Yemen, amounting to US$14 million. Yemen's needs were determined by a survey between officials in the Ministry of Electricity and workers in the United Nations Office for the Coordination of Humanitarian Affairs. Several departments within the United Nations provided assistance as well toward a crop assessment, drugs, and wheat flour. The World Health Organization provided medical supplies to the country. The International Federation of Red Cross and Red Crescent Societies provided 3 million water tablets, along with cash and general supplies. The European Commission (precursor to the European Union) donated about US$186,000 to the Yemeni Red Cross, and other European countries – France, Germany, Italy, the Netherlands, Norway, Spain, Sweden, Switzerland, and the United Kingdom – also provided assistance. Other countries in the Middle East also sent supplies to Yemen. Neighboring Oman sent 28 metric tons of food, and Qatar sent US$1.2 million worth of food, blankets, and tents. Syria sent US$5 million worth of food aid. As part of a plan toward preventing future floods, the World Bank provided US$14.5 million to rebuild roads, power and water plants, and regrowing lost crops.

In the months after the floods, the government of Yemen sought help from the International Development Association to prevent future floods from being as damaging. The government created an Emergency Flood Rehabilitation Project that was geared toward more long-term solutions. Thousands of farmers benefited from the improved irrigation and from the employment opportunities. Roads and bridges were rebuilt to a higher construction standard using local builders and contractors, the first such occurrence in the country using competitive bidding. The project was completed in December 2001 at a cost of US$31.59 million; the International Development Association paid US$27.44 million, and Yemen's government provided the rest of the funding.

== See also ==
- List of Arabian Peninsula tropical cyclones
- 2002 Oman cyclone – short-lived storm that caused similar effects in Oman
- 2008 Yemen cyclone – deadly storm that killed 200 people in the country
