= Wadi Ahwar =

River in Yemen

Wadi Ahwar is a major seasonal watercourse (wadi) of southern Yemen. It flows into the Gulf of Aden in Ahwar District, Abyan Governorate at 13°25′39″N 46°40′49″E, near the village of Ahwar.

The catchment of Wadi Ahwar has been estimated at approximately 6,300 km² up to diversion points, and somewhat larger when the deltaic area is included. The wadi is fed largely by episodic rainfall events and characterised by spate flows rather than a steady perennial river. In the upstream mountainous areas, runoff is relatively rapid.

The Wadi Ahwar delta zone supports irrigated agriculture, particularly where flood-waters and groundwater are harnessed. Traditional ‘spate’ irrigation techniques divert flood flows into fields; agricultural crops include cotton (long-staple), sorghum, millet, vegetables and melons. However, the irrigation infrastructure in the region is old and often poorly maintained, and groundwater abstraction is approaching safe yield levels, with concern about sustainability.

Development projects, such as the “Water Sector Support Project” have been undertaken in the Wadi Ahwar basin aiming at weir rehabilitation, canal system improvement, flood-diversion works and groundwater recharge enhancement.

Because Wadi Ahwar drains from relatively steep mountain terrain down to the coastal plain, the geomorphology involves a transition from rocky upland slopes, shallow soils and sparse vegetation, into broader alluvial fans and deltaic deposits. Sediment yield is significant during flood events. Sea-water intrusion into the delta aquifer system is of concern because over-abstraction and reduced recharge weaken the freshwater lens. Groundwater depletion has been reported.

== See also ==
- List of wadis of Yemen
