= Awaliq =

Arab tribal confederation

The Awaliq is an Arab tribal confederation in Yemen.

== Structure ==
The Awaliq is a confederation of several tribes, and consists of many branches. Their two main subdivisions are the Upper Awlaqi and the Lower Awlaqi. Each branch is led by separate sheikhs, but they are closely linked and historically banded together when faced with aggression. The territory of the Awaliq resides in modern-day Abyan and Shabwah governorates of the Republic of Yemen, the Lower Awlaki primarily occupying the former and the Upper Awlaki the latter.

== History ==
=== Origins ===
According to R.A.B. Hamilton, the term Awaliq is of "fairly recent origin". The Awaliq traditionally trace their lineage to the pre-Islamic kingdoms of Ma'in and Awsan. According to the Gazetteer of Arabia, they descend from remnants of the Minaean dynasty who fled their native territory due to persecution during the Ridda Wars after the death of the Islamic prophet Muhammad. Alongside two familial branches of a former chieftain, they migrated southwards and settled in Wadi Yashbum as rayah, paying taxes to the neighbouring Sultanate of Habban. Eventually the area grew too crowded and the "Ahl Ma'an" left to the nearby mountains. The two clans which remained, Ahl Abdullah and Ahl Ali, began to resent their excessive taxation by the mid-16th century, forging an alliance with the Ahl Ma'an in 1590 AD to annex the sultanate of Nisab. The Ahl Abdullah became the new rulers of Nisab, from which the Aulaqi Sultanate descended from.

Many of the Ahl Ma'an resettled in Nisab while the rest returned to Wadi Yashbum, as did the Ahl Ali. The neighbouring Ba Kazim tribe proposed an alliance with the Ahl Ali to capture Ahwar from the Ahl Zedi tribe. An Awlaqi diplomat named Sheikh Aboid negotiated an agreement in which the Ba Kazim would receive three-fourths of the arable land in Ahwar while the Ahl Ali would receive one-fourth and control over the sultanate. After Ahwar was captured and the Ahl Zedi were defeated, the Ba Kazim spread throughout the area and became what is known as the Lower Awaliq. After the Ahl Ali left, a division of the Ahl Ma'an abandoned the mountains and settled into Wadi Yashbum.

=== British ===
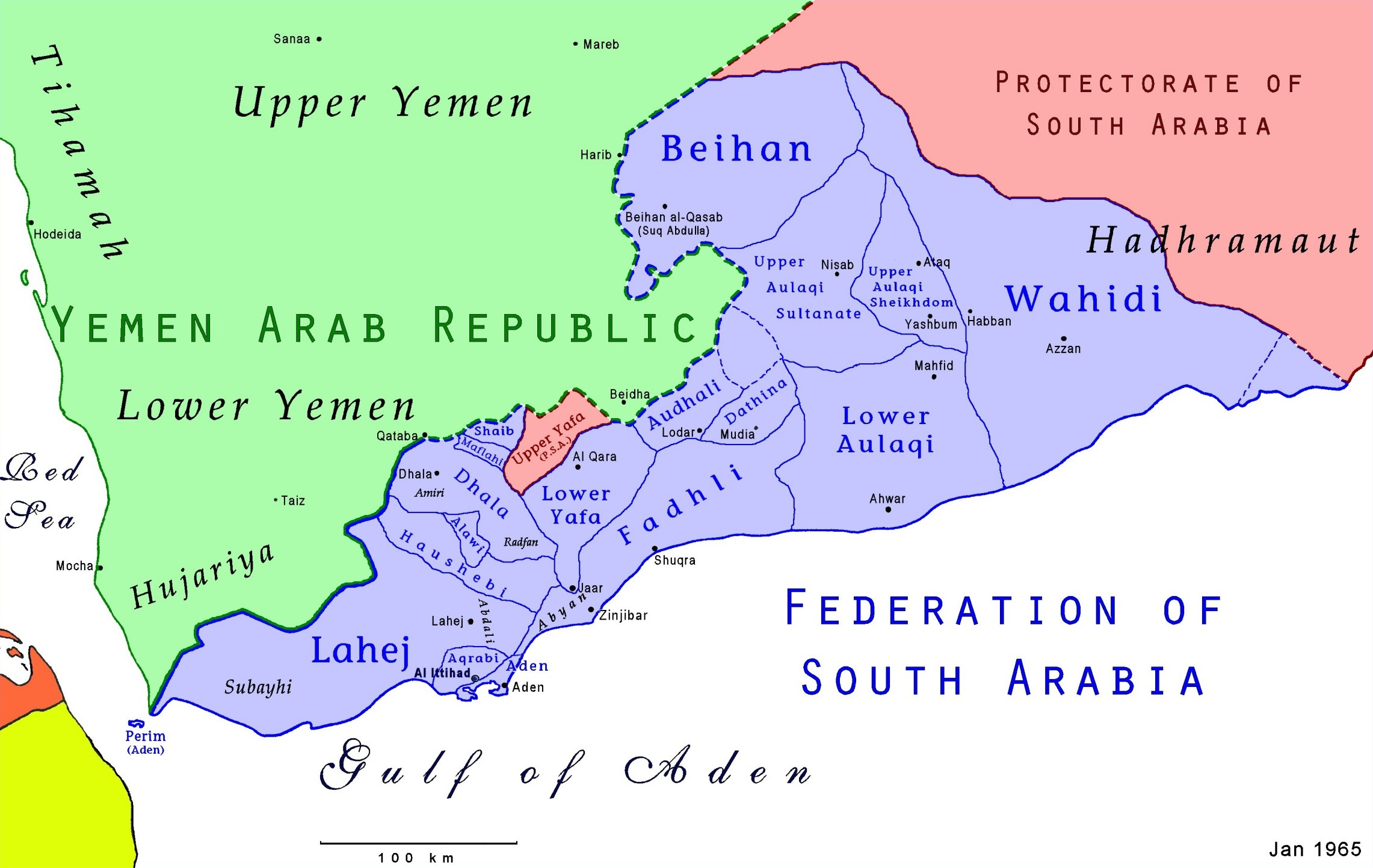

After the British Empire began to colonize southern Yemen in 1839, the Awaliq served as a key tribal ally of theirs. The Awaliq were divided between three polities during this period: the Lower Aulaqi Sultanate, the Upper Aulaqi Sultanate, and the Upper Aulaqi Sheikhdom. The Upper Awlaqi Sheikhdom forged a particularly strong relationship with the British.

A British handbook from 1960 described the Upper Aulaqi Sheikhdom as among "tribal areas which co-operate 'fairly well' with the British", the Lower Aulaqi Sultanate among "tribal areas where cooperation is slight and local conditions of insecurity obstruct", and the Upper Aulaqi Sultanate among "'wild Tribal areas' where government has not entered and where there is no formal local authority".
