= Wadi Bani Khawlan =

Wadi Bani Khawlan وادي بني خولان
- Sub-district
- Location in Yemen
- Coordinates: 13°26′08″N 43°56′34″E
- Country: Yemen
- Governorate: Taiz Governorate
- District: Jabal Habashi District
- Elevation: 1,139 m (3,737 ft)

Population (2004)
  - Total: 3,264
- Time zone: UTC+3

Wadi Bani Khawlan (Arabic: وادي بني خولان) is a sub-district in Jabal Habashi District, Taiz Governorate, Yemen. Wadi Bani Khawlan had a population of 3,264 at the 2004 census.

== See also ==
- List of wadis of Yemen
