= Wadi Mawr =

Wadi in Yemen

Wadi Mawr is the largest of the wadis descending from the western Yemeni mountains toward the Red Sea, with a catchment area of about 7,500 square kilometers.

== Flow ==
It flows year-round for much of its course, including for 25 km across the Tihama, as well as for 16 km upstream of the confluence with the Wadi Laʽah. Its headwaters, as well as some of its tributaries, flow intermittently. Its flow varies from year to year. The headwaters of Wadi Mawr are located in the area around Jabal Miswar. Tributaries include the Wadi Laʽah, the Wadi Waru, the Wadi Husayb, and the Wadi Dhubawah and Wadi Sharas. Wadi Mawr's course and tributaries are entirely located within the borders of Yemen. The wadi system to the south of Wadi Mawr is the Wadi Surdud.

== Fertility ==
Vegetation is lightly scattered across the upper reaches of the wadi, in the mountains, while much of the area along the Wadi Mawr in the Tihama is under cultivation, until about two-thirds of the way down to the coast. The population today is largely nomadic in origin.

== Description ==
The 10th-century writer al-Hamdani provided a detailed description of the complex tributary system of Wadi Mawr, but his description is somewhat confused and fails to describe the system's major features, and it's doubtful that he really understood the Wadi Mawr system very well.

== History ==
In 1975, a gauging station was established at Shatt al Erge, in a rocky canyon at the point where the Wadi Mawr enters the Tihama plain.

== See also ==
- List of wadis of Yemen
