= Wadi Hamir =

Wadi in Southern Iraq

Wādī Ḩamīr (Arabic: وادي حمير) is a wadi in southern Iraq, nearby to the towns of Mukhāţ, Tall Mukhāţ, Nukhayb and Ar Raţţāwī. It lies just north of the Saudi Arabian border on the road from Baghdad to the Arar, Saudi Arabia oil fields. The Wadi is known to originate from Northern Saudi Arabia, an arid, hot desert climate where precipitation is too low to sustain any vegetation.

== See also ==
- List of wadis of Saudi Arabia
- List of wadis of Yemen
