= 1995–96 South Pacific cyclone season =

Tropical cyclone season

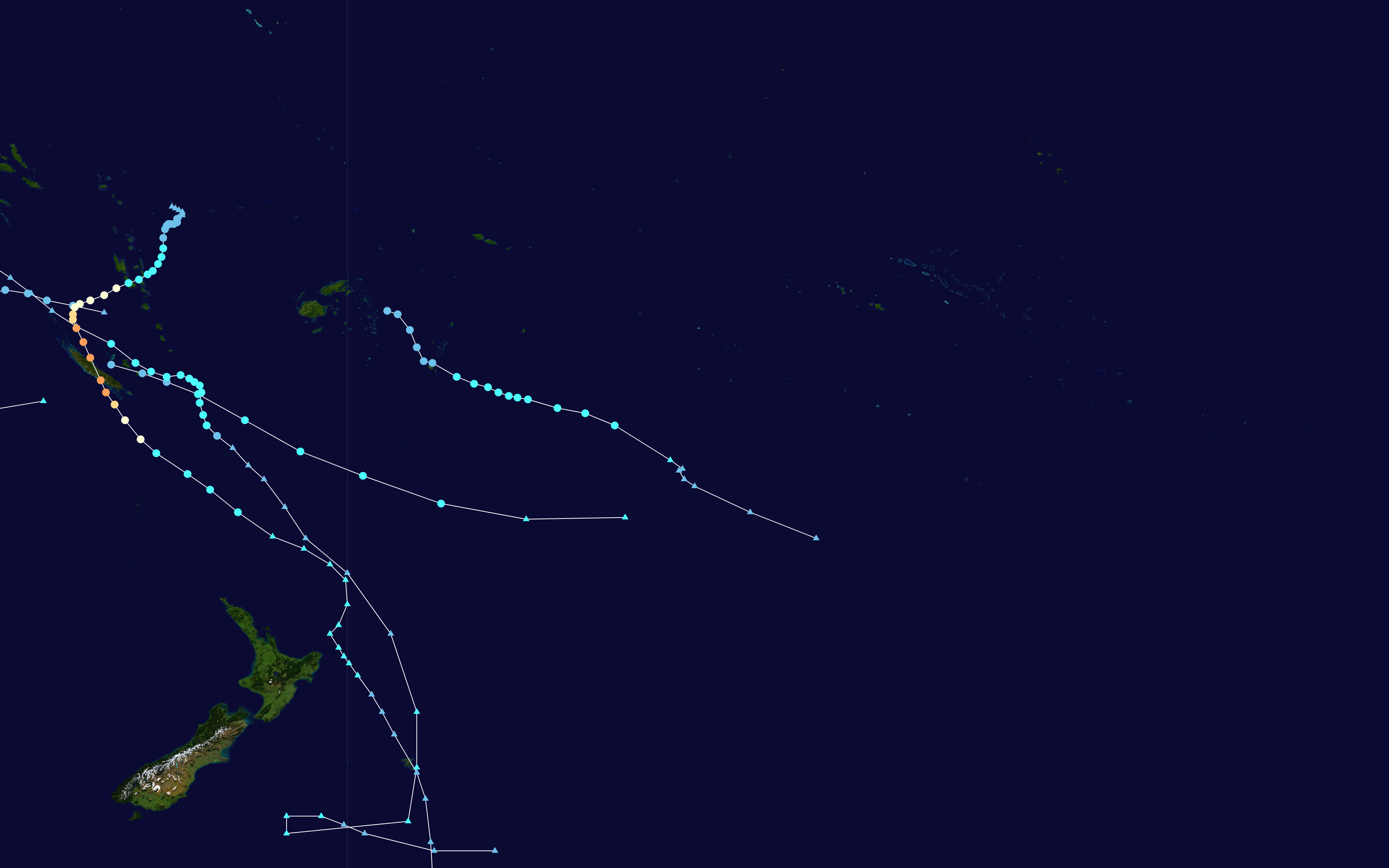
- Season summary map

Seasonal boundaries
- First system formed: January 12, 1996
- Last system dissipated: March 28, 1996

Strongest storm
- Name: Beti
  - Maximum winds: 165 km/h (105 mph) (10-minute sustained)
  - Lowest pressure: 935 hPa (mbar)

Seasonal statistics
- Total depressions: 7
- Tropical cyclones: 5
- Severe tropical cyclones: 1
- Total fatalities: 2
- Total damage: $5.6 million (1996 USD)

Related articles
- 1995–96 Australian region cyclone season; 1995–96 South-West Indian Ocean cyclone season

The 1995–96 South Pacific cyclone season was a below average South Pacific tropical cyclone season, with only five tropical cyclones occurring within the South Pacific Ocean to the east of 160°E. The season officially ran from November 1, 1995, until April 30, 1996. The first storm developed on January 12, while the last one dissipated on April 2. During the season the most intense tropical cyclone was Severe Tropical Cyclone Beti, which reached a minimum pressure of 935 hPa (27.61 inHg) as it affected New Caledonia. After the season ended Beti's name was the only name to be retired from the tropical cyclone naming lists and was replaced with Bune, after it inflicted over 5.6 million (USD) worth of damage to Australia, Vanuatu, New Caledonia and New Zealand.

During the season, tropical cyclones were officially monitored by the Regional Specialized Meteorological Center (RSMC) in Nadi, Fiji, and the Tropical Cyclone Warning Centers (TCWC) in Brisbane, Australia and Wellington, New Zealand. Throughout the season the United States Navy also monitored the basin and issued unofficial warnings, through its Joint Typhoon Warning Center (JTWC) and Naval Pacific Meteorology and Oceanography Center (NPMOC). Tropical cyclones that were located between 160°E and 120°W, as well as the Equator and 25°S, were monitored by RSMC Nadi while any that were located to the south of 25°S between 160°E and 120°W were monitored by TCWC Wellington. During the season the JTWC issued warnings on any tropical cyclone that was located between 160°E and 180° while the NPMOC issued warnings for tropical cyclones forming between the 180° and the American coast. RSMC Nadi and TCWC Wellington both used the Australian Tropical Cyclone Intensity Scale, and measured windspeeds over a 10-minute period during the season, while the JTWC and the NPMOC measured sustained windspeeds over a 1-minute period.

== Seasonal summary ==
Record	Tropical Cyclone	Severe Tropical Cyclone	Ref
Average activity: (1969–70 – 1994–95)	7 – 8	4
Record high activity:	1982–83: 14	1982–83:10
Record low activity	1994–95: 3	1994–95: 0
Activity during this season:	5	1

Because of a weak–moderate La Niña episode, most tropical cyclones that developed within the season occurred within the Coral Sea. The weak La Nina conditions also affected the amount of tropical cyclones that occurred during the year, with only 5 tropical cyclones occurring within the basin. During December 24, Tropical Cyclone Gertie moved into the basin from the Australian region, before it passed to the south of New Caledonia and weakened below tropical cyclone intensity.

Cyclone Yasi, developed on January 12 as a tropical depression before it was named on January 16. As a tropical cyclone, Yasi brought significant rain to both Fiji and Tonga before it dissipated on January 19 to the south of Papette in French Polynesia. After Yasi dissipated, no tropical cyclones were recorded in the basin until March 9; however on February 12, a tropical low developed to the west of New Caledonia. Over the next 24 hours the low deepened to about 1002 hPa before it crossed 160°E and moved into the Australian region where it became known as the Queen Elizabeth II storm. On February 22 and 23, a shallow tropical depression moved around the Fijian archipelago and caused some flooding of low-lying areas in Vanua Levu. On March 9 and 10, Tropical Cyclones Zaka and Atu both developed near New Caledonia, about 1,000 km (620 mi) apart and took similar tracks towards the southeast before becoming extratropical. On March 21, the final tropical cyclone of the season developed to the northeast of Vanuatu. Over the next couple of days the depression gradually developed further and was named as Beti, before it passed over Vanuatu and New Caledonia. On March 29, after it had passed over New Caledonia, Beti degenerated into an extratropical cyclone, before dissipating on April 2. After the season ended the name Beti was retired from the tropical cyclone naming lists.

== Systems ==
=== Tropical Cyclone Yasi ===
- Category 1 tropical cyclone (Australian scale)
- Tropical storm (SSHWS)
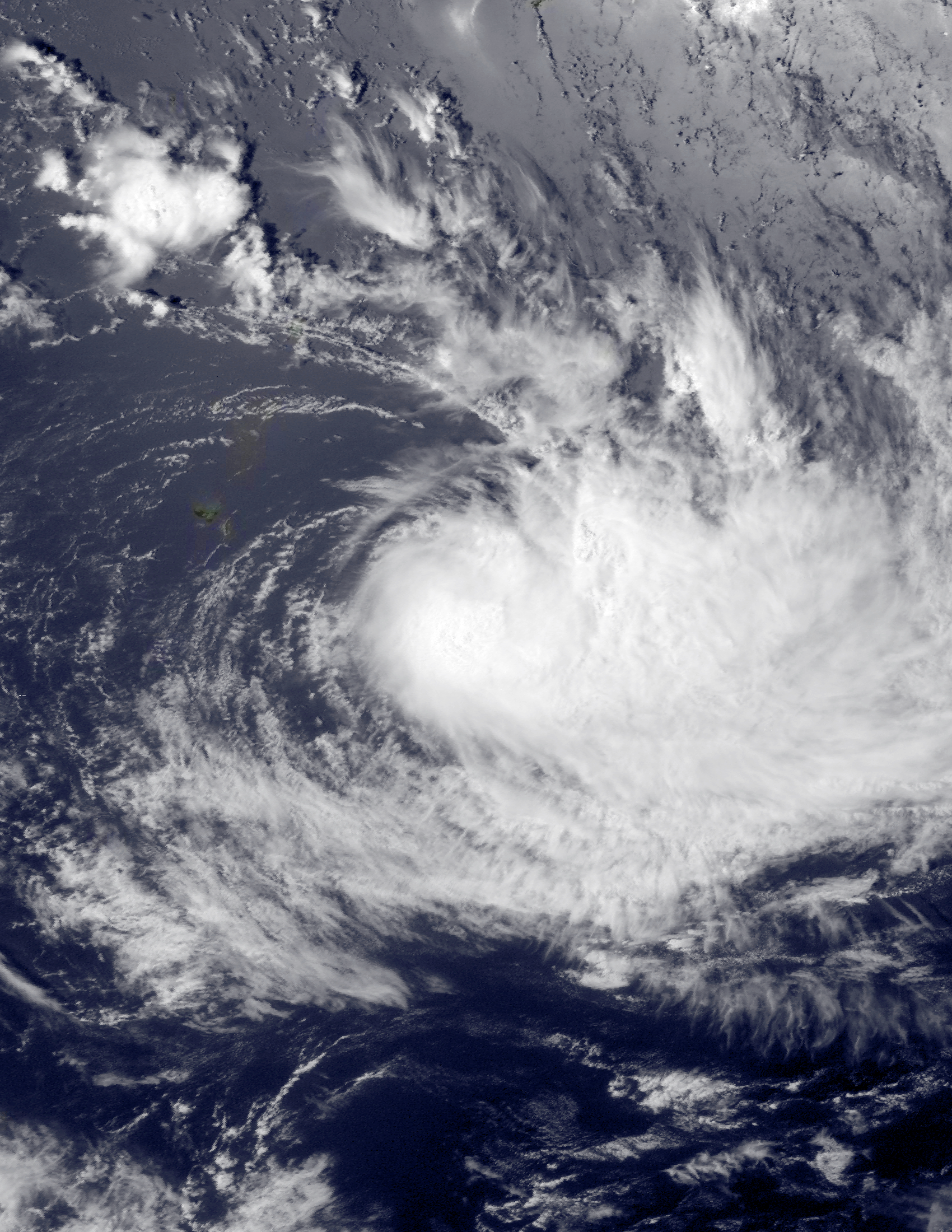
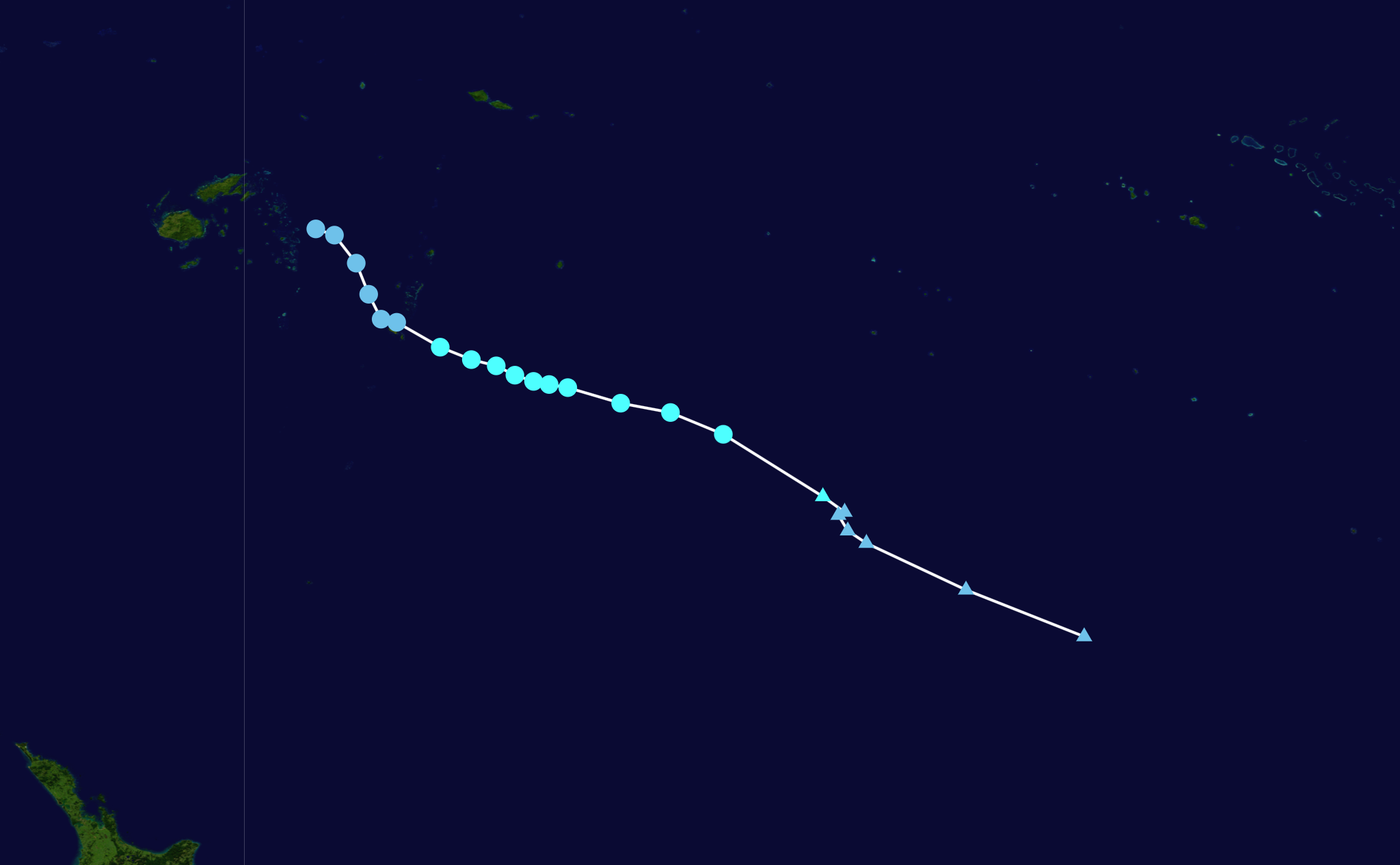
- Duration: January 12 – January 19
- Peak intensity: 85 km/h (50 mph) (10-min); 987 hPa (mbar)

On January 12, the FMS reported that a tropical depression had developed over the Fijian island of Vanua Levu, about 430 km (270 mi) to the south of Labasa. Over the next few days, the depression moved towards the southeast before it started to affect Tonga on January 15. During the following day, the depression rapidly developed further as it interacted with the South Pacific Convergence Zone before the NPMOC initiated warnings on the system and designated it as 08P. At 0000 UTC on January 17, the NPMOC reported that the depression had peaked with 1-minute sustained wind speeds of 85 km/h (50 mph), while the FMS reported that the depression had intensified into a tropical cyclone while it was located about 510 km (320 mi) to the southeast of Nukualofa, Tonga. However, the FMS did not name it Yasi for another 12 hours, while the system reached its peak 10-minute sustained wind speeds of 85 km/h (50 mph). After it was named on January 17, Yasi accelerated towards the southeast before it moved out of the FMS's area of responsibility. On January 18, the NPMOC issued its final warning because Yasi had degenerated into an extratropical cyclone. MetService monitored Yasi's remnants for another day before the system dissipated about 1,520 km (940 mi) to the south of Papeete, French Polynesia. Although no major damage was reported from any of the islands affected, some minor damage was reported in Tonga, after Yasi caused heavy rainfall there.

=== Tropical Cyclone Zaka ===
- Category 1 tropical cyclone (Australian scale)
- Tropical storm (SSHWS)
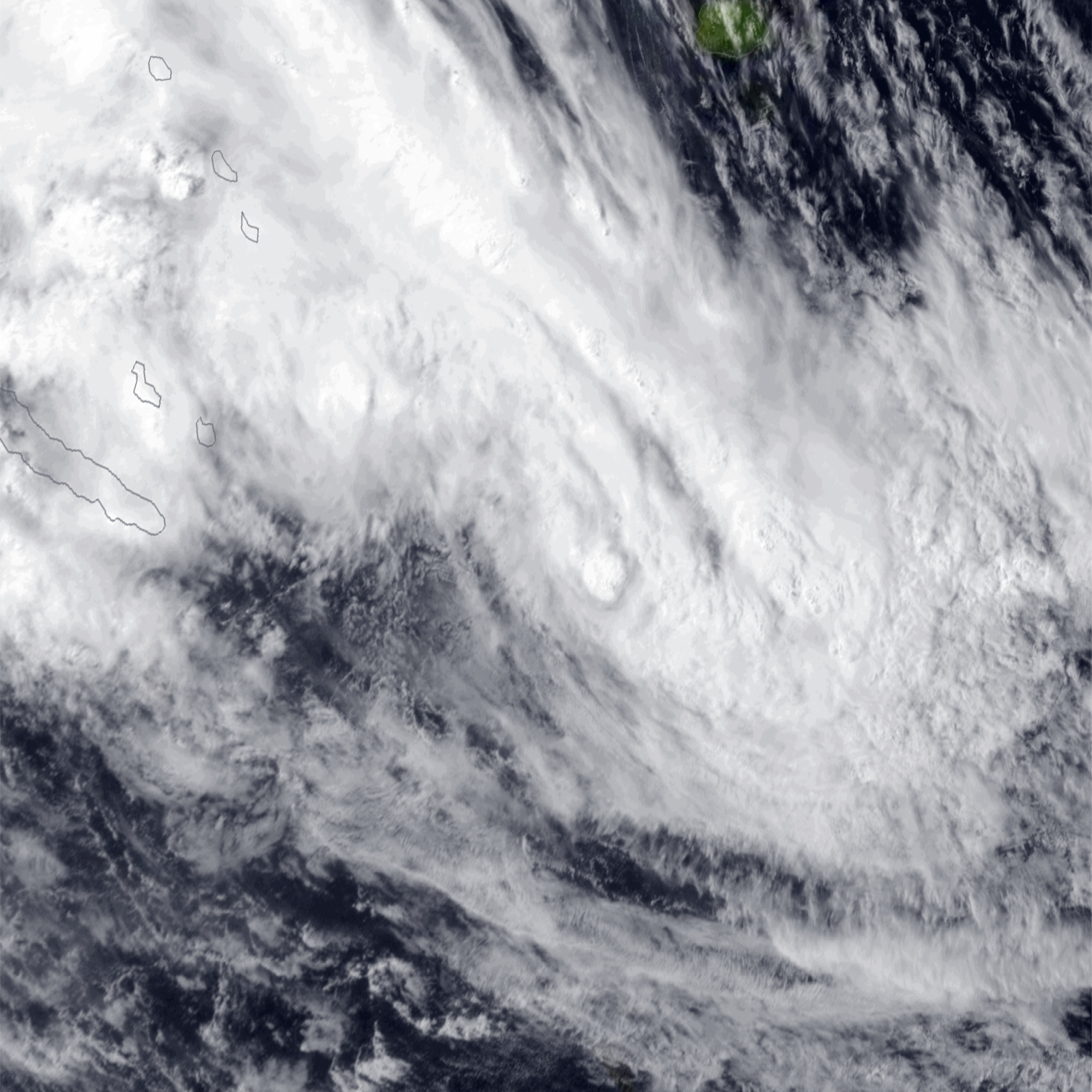
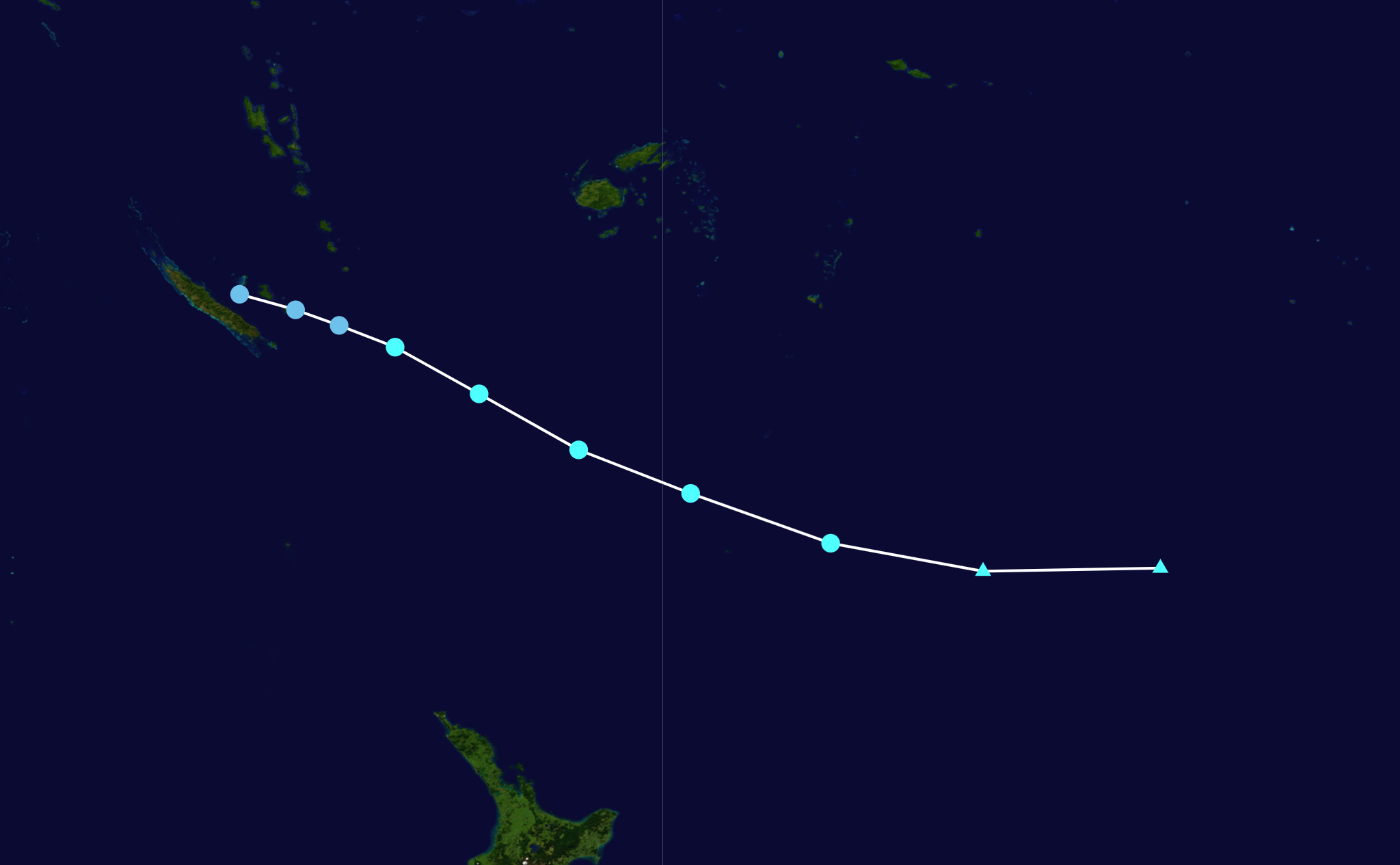
- Duration: March 9 – March 11
- Peak intensity: 65 km/h (40 mph) (10-min); 995 hPa (mbar)

On March 9, the FMS started to monitor a tropical depression had developed within an active convergence zone, about 150 km (93 mi) to the northwest of Nouméa, New Caledonia. During that day an upper-level trough moved over New Zealand which brought the jet stream over New Caledonia. As a result, this made the depression hard to locate with satellite imagery. However, later that day despite the system being poorly organized, the FMS reported that the depression had intensified into a tropical cyclone and named it Zaka. As they named it RSMC Nadi reported that the system had reached its peak 10-minute sustained windspeeds of 65 km/h (40 mph) with further development of the system restricted by strong vertical wind shear. Early on March 10, the JTWC designated Zaka as Tropical Cyclone 20P, while it had its peak 1-minute windspeeds of 75 km/h (47 mph). The FMS then issued their final advisory at 0600 UTC, as Zaka had weakened into a tropical depression and was moving into TCWC Wellingtons area of responsibility. TCWC Wellington and the JTWC monitored Zaka for another day before it was last noted during March 11 as it became an extratropical cyclone. Zaka dumped 376 mm (14.8 in) of rain on Vanuatu in just 24 hours.

=== Tropical Cyclone Atu ===
- Category 1 tropical cyclone (Australian scale)
- Tropical storm (SSHWS)
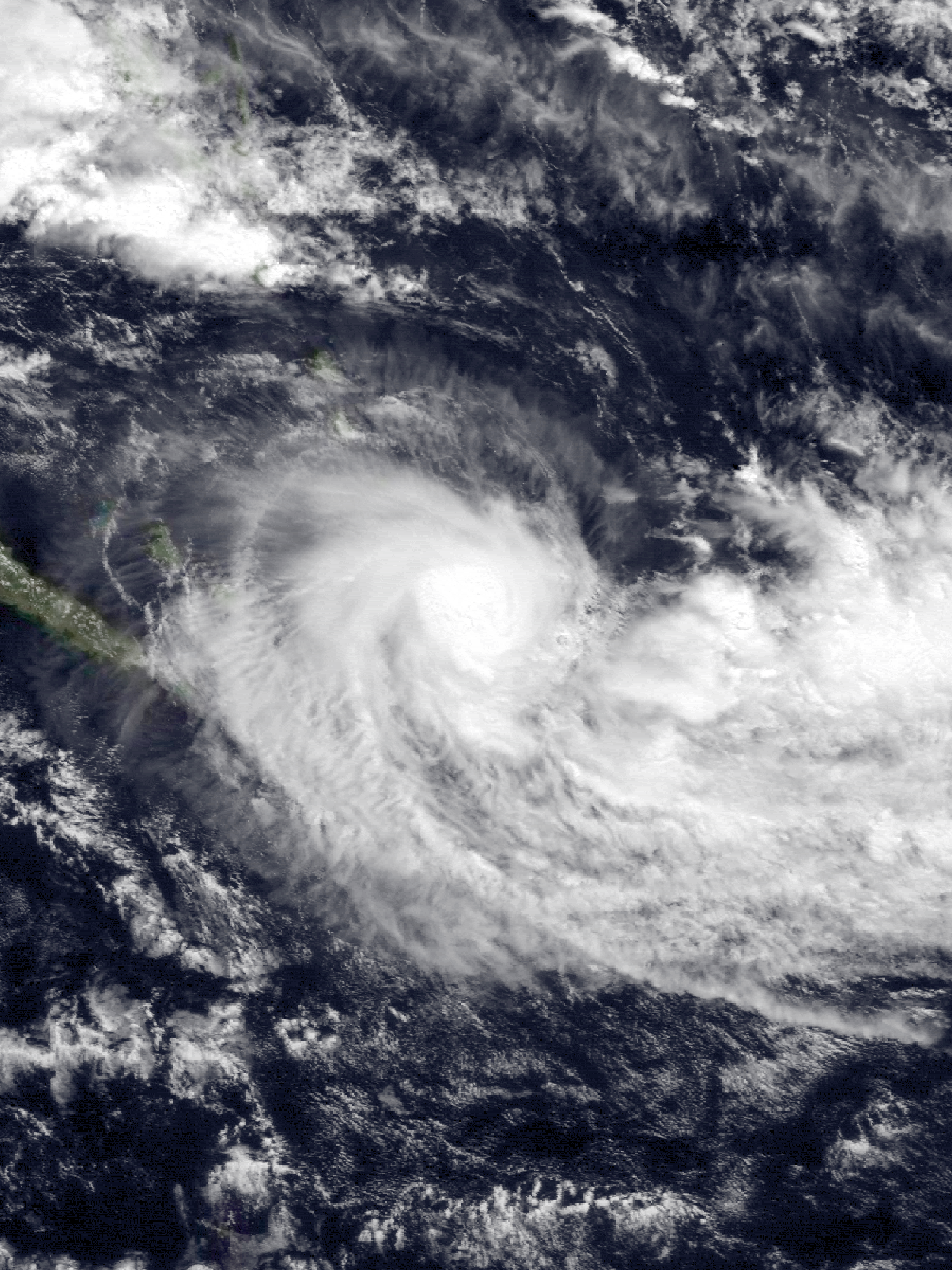
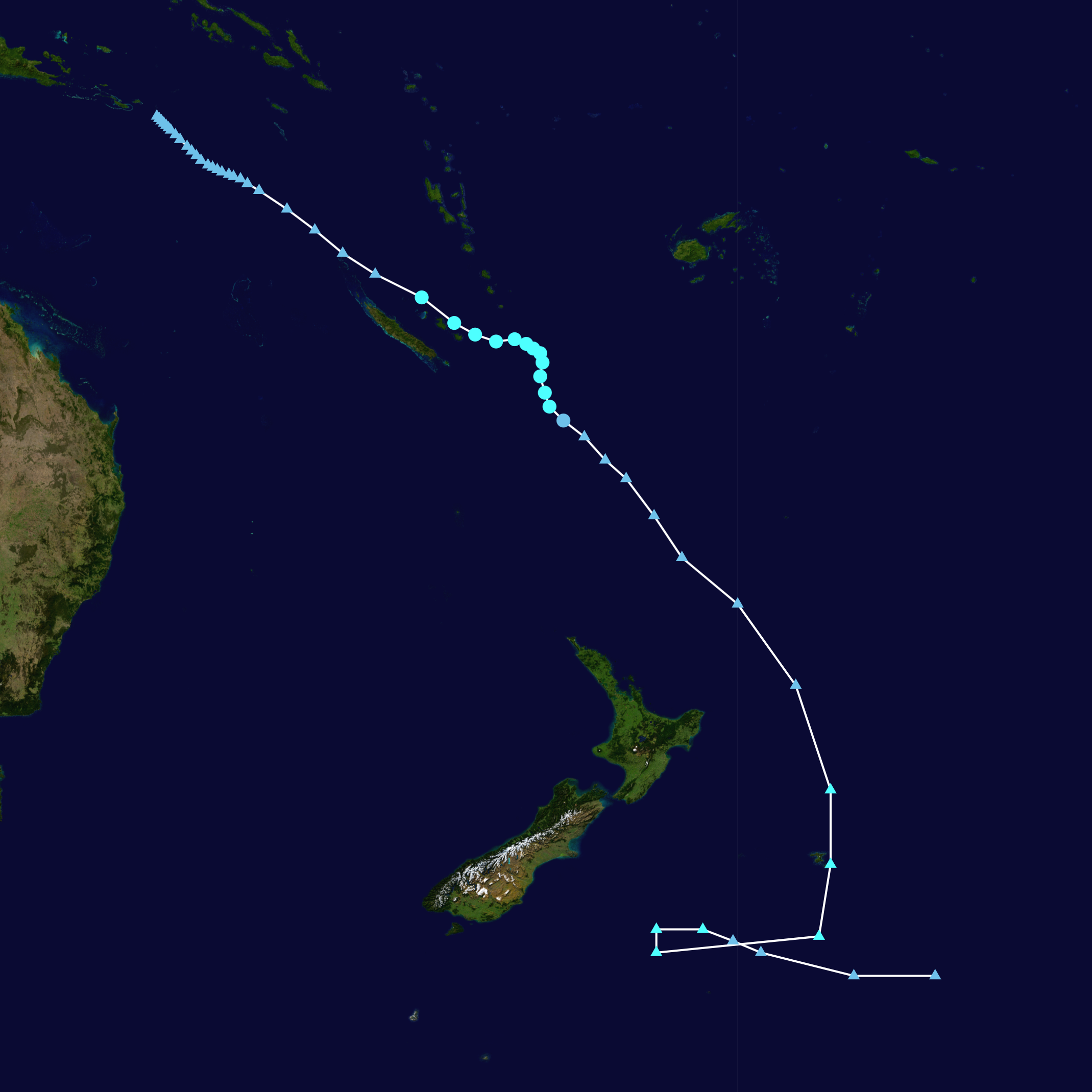
- Duration: March 10 – March 13
- Peak intensity: 85 km/h (50 mph) (10-min); 987 hPa (mbar)

On March 4, the JTWC started to monitor an area of disturbed weather that had developed within the Australian region about 900 km (560 mi), to the southeast of Port Moresby in Papua New Guinea. Over the next few days, the system remained weak and gradually moved southeast before it crossed 160°E and moved into the basin on March 9. During the next day, both the JTWC and the FMS started to monitor the system as a tropical depression as it moved through the Loyalty Islands. On March 11, the depression intensified into a tropical cyclone as it moved southeastward, prompting the FMS to name it Atu at 1800 UTC. Early on March 12, the JTWC reported that Atu had reached its peak 1-minute windspeeds of 100 km/h (62 mph). Later that morning the FMS reported that Atu had reached its peak 10-minute sustained windspeeds of 85 km/h (53 mph). After it had peaked in intensity, Atu weakened under the influence of strong vertical windshear before the JTWC and the FMS issued their final advisories during March 13, as Atu had become extratropical. Atu's remnants were then monitored by the FMS and MetService until they dissipated on March 18.

=== Severe Tropical Cyclone Beti ===
- Category 4 severe tropical cyclone (Australian scale)
- Category 3 tropical cyclone (SSHWS)
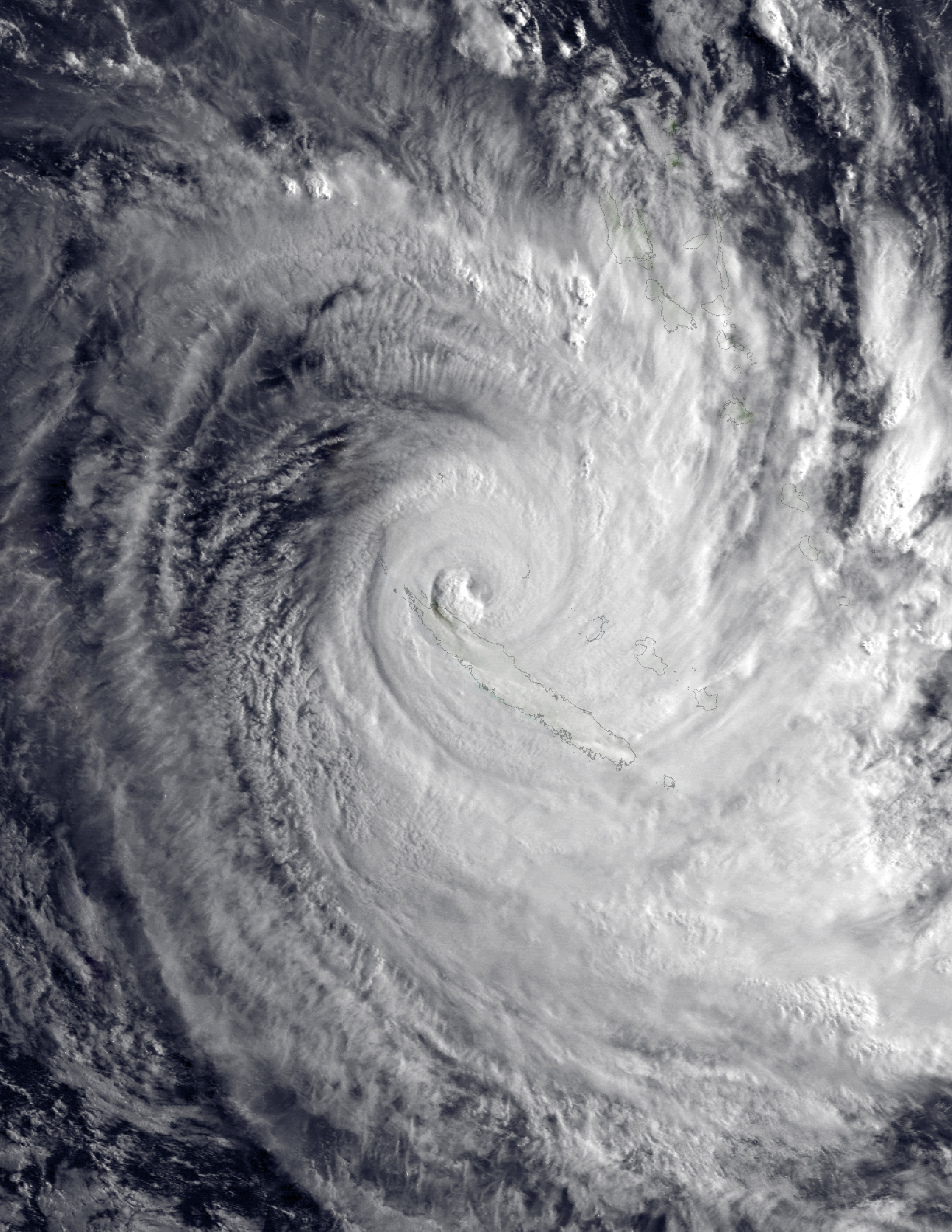
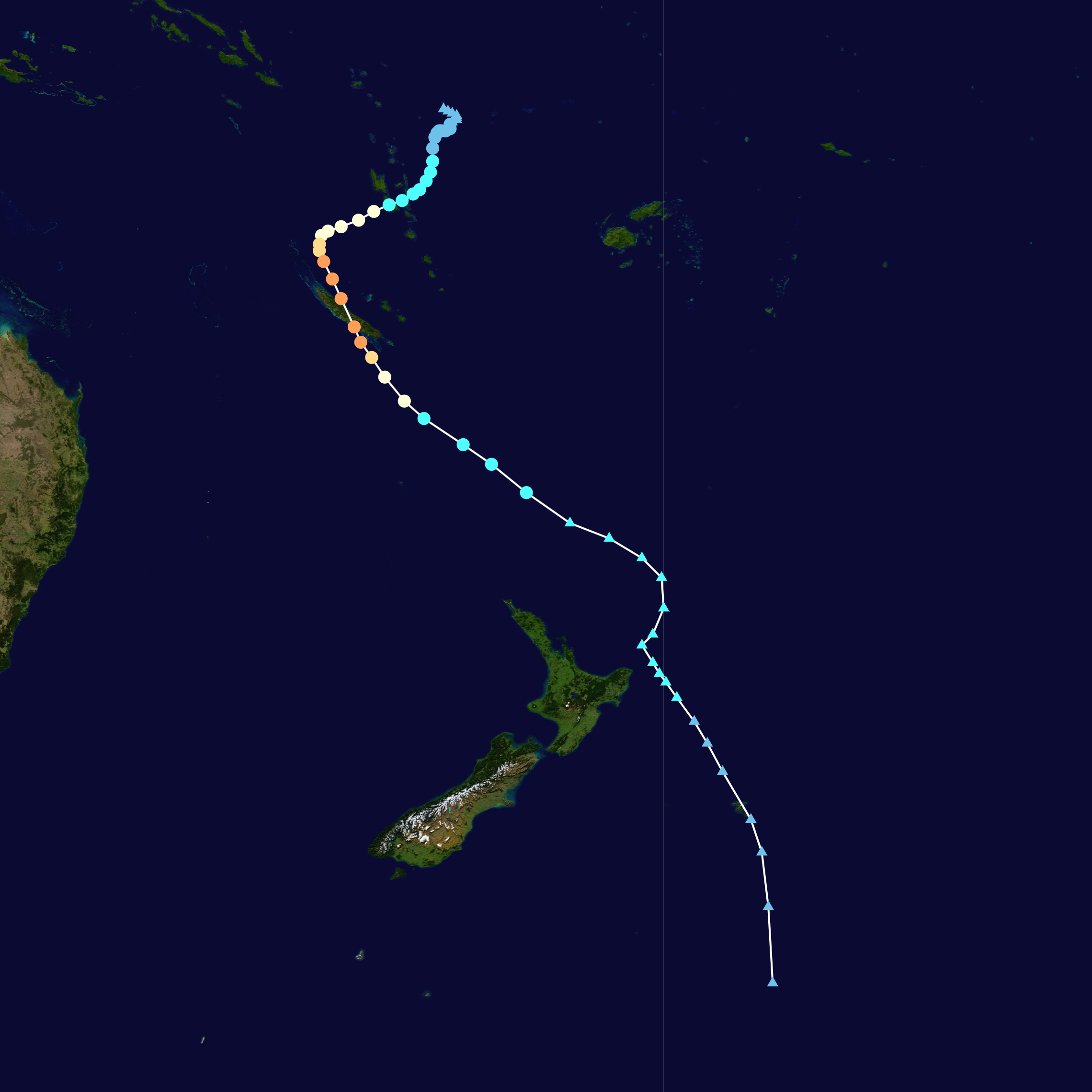
- Duration: March 21 – March 28
- Peak intensity: 165 km/h (105 mph) (10-min); 935 hPa (mbar)

On March 19, the JTWC started to monitor a tropical disturbance that was located about 1,145 km (711 mi) to the northwest of Suva, Fiji. Over the next couple of days, the system moved towards the south and gradually developed further in an area of low vertical windshear, before the system was designated as Tropical Depression 23P by the JTWC on March 21. Over the next couple of days, 23P moved further towards the south, before the depression started to move towards the southwest as a ridge of high pressure strengthened on March 23. Later that day, the FMS reported that the depression had intensified into a category 1 tropical cyclone and named it as Beti. During that day, Beti continued to develop further before the system moved into the Coral Sea on March 24, after passing over the Vanuatuan islands of Pentecost and Malekula. As Beti moved into the Coral Sea, the system quickly intensified further, with the FMS reporting on March 25 that Beti had intensified into a category 3 severe tropical cyclone. As Beti intensified into a severe tropical cyclone, the ridge of high pressure weakened as it interacted with an upper-level trough of low pressure. As a result, the system started to move towards the south-southeast.

Over the next couple of days Beti continued to intensify as it moved towards New Caledonia, before the JTWC reported at 1800 UTC on March 26, that Beti had reached its peak 1-minute sustained windspeeds of 195 km/h (121 mph). Six hours later, the FMS reported that the system had peaked as a category 4 severe tropical cyclone with 10-minute sustained windspeeds of 165 km/h (103 mph). Later on March 27, Severe Tropical Cyclone Beti made landfall on the Grande Terre island of New Caledonia near its peak intensity and quickly weakened into a category 2 tropical cyclone. During the next day, Beti moved towards the southeast under the influence of the trough, reemerging into the Coral Sea as a weakening tropical cyclone that had started to transition into an extratropical cyclone. Later on March 28, the FMS passed the primary warning responsibility of the cyclone to MetService, before the JTWC issued their final advisory on Beti as it had become extratropical. Over the next few days, TCWC Wellington continued to monitor Beti's remnants, as they came under the influence of a high pressure area and moved around New Zealand's East Coast, before they were last noted on April 2 while located about 1,400 km (870 mi) to the southeast of Wellington.

While it was active, Cyclone Beti was responsible for 2 deaths and caused damage in Australia, New Caledonia, New Zealand, and Vanuatu. The most significant damage occurred in New Caledonia where wind and flooding destroyed crops, gardens and caused disruption to the electricity network, water supply, road and telephone communications. Many homes and roads were also badly damaged, with over 50% of lower standard housing on the outskirts of Nouméa damaged after rivers and creeks burst their banks. Press reports indicated that Beti inflicted between FF 22-27 million (US$4.3 - 5.3 million) in damage to New Caledonia and that only a few injuries had occurred. (Note: This damage total was originally reported in French francs and was converted to United States Dollars via the Oanda Corporation website.) Within Vanuatu, Beti caused about VUV4.5 million, (US$41,000) in damage to food gardens and shelters. (Note: This damage total was originally reported in United States Dollars and was converted to Vanuatu vatus via the Oanda Corporation website.) As an extratropical cyclone, Beti generated a high surf and long period swells that hit both eastern Australia and New Zealand. Within Australia, the high surf left several competitors in the Australian life surfing championships injured, while another competitor was killed after his boat was swamped by large waves. Within New Zealand, Beti's remnants caused flooding and mud-slips, which led to several roads being closed. A helicopter and its pilot were lost at the height of the storm, while they were travelling from Napier to Gisborne.

=== Other systems ===
During December 23, the remnants of Severe Tropical Cyclone Gertie, moved westwards off the Australian mainland and into the Coral Sea near Maryborough. After moving into the Coral Sea, the system underwent a period of rapid intensification, during which it reintensified into a subtropical cyclone and caused gale-force winds along the southern Queensland Coast. During the following day, gale-force winds eased along the Queensland coast, as Gertie moved north-eastwards into the South Pacific basin, where it peaked with 10-minute sustained windspeeds of 75 km/h (45 mph). The system subsequently passed to the south of New Caledonia and was last noted on December 24, as it weakened below tropical cyclone intensity. During February 12, a tropical low developed to the west of New Caledonia. Over the next 24 hours the low deepened to about 1002 hPa (29.59 inHg) before it crossed 160°E and moved into the Australian region where it became known as the Queen Elizabeth II storm. On February 22 and 23, a shallow tropical depression moved around the Fijian archipelago and caused some flooding of low-lying areas in Vanua Levu.

== Season effects ==
1995–96 South Pacific cyclone season
Name	Dates active	Peak intensity			Areas affected	Damage (US$)	Deaths	Refs
Name	Dates active	Category	Wind speed	Pressure	Areas affected	Damage (US$)	Deaths	Refs
Gertie	December 24	Category 1 tropical cyclone	75 km/h (45 mph)	990 hPa (29.23 inHg)	None	None	None	
Yasi	January 12 – 19	Category 1 tropical cyclone	85 km/h (50 mph)	987 hPa (29.15 inHg)	Fiji, Tonga	Minor	None	
Unnamed	February 12 – 14	Tropical depression	Not Specified	Not Specified	None	None	None	
Unnamed	February 22 – 24	Tropical depression	Not Specified	Not Specified	Fiji	Minor	None	
Zaka	March 9 – 11	Category 1 tropical cyclone	75 km/h (45 mph)	993 hPa (29.32 inHg)	New Caledonia	Minor	None	
Atu	March 10 – 13	Category 1 tropical cyclone	85 km/h (50 mph)	987 hPa (29.15 inHg)	New Caledonia	Minor	None	
Beti	March 21 – 28	Category 4 severe tropical cyclone	165 km/h (105 mph)	935 hPa (27.61 inHg)	Australia, Vanuatu; New Caledonia, New Zealand	$5.3 million	2	
Season aggregates
7 systems	December 24, 1995 – March 28, 1996		165 km/h (105 mph)	935 hPa (27.61 inHg)		$5.3 million	2	

== See also ==
- Atlantic hurricane seasons: 1995, 1996
- Pacific hurricane seasons: 1995, 1996
- Pacific typhoon seasons: 1995, 1996
- North Indian Ocean cyclone seasons: 1995, 1996
