= List of wadis of Yemen =

Yemen does not have any permanent rivers, but does have numerous wadis, which is either a permanently or an intermittently dry riverbed. This is a list of wadis in Yemen. This list is arranged by drainage basin, with respective tributaries indented under each larger stream's name.

== Red Sea ==
- Wadi Harad
- Wadi Mawr
- Wadi Akhraf
- Wadi Haydan
- Wadi Surdud
- Wadi Siham
- Wadi Rima
- Wadi Zabid
- Wadi Mawza
- Wadi Bani Khawlan
- Wadi De Nachib
- Wadi Alwoja Raimah

== Gulf of Aden ==
- Wadi Harim
- Wadi Tuban
- Wadi Bana
- Wadi Hassan
- Wadi Ahwar (Wadi Jurrah)
- Wadi Milh (Wadi Ar Ruqub)
- Wadi Mayfa‘ah
- Wadi Amaqin
- Wadi Hada
- Wadi Hajr
- Wadi Huwayrah
- Wadi al Masilah
- Wadi Hibun
- Wadi Hamir
- Wadi Hayfari
- Wadi Tabaqim
- Wadi Sana
- Wadi Adim
- Wadi Hadramawt (Hadhramaut)
- Wadi Sarr
- Wadi Amd
- Wadi al Jiz
- Wadi Dawan (Dhahawn)
- Wadi Kidyut
- Wadi Mahrat
- Wadi Tinhalin

== Rub' al-Khali ==
- Wadi Jawf
- Wadi Raghwan
- Wadi al Kharid
- Wadi Abrad
- Wadi as Sudd
- Wadi Harib
- Wadi Dumays
- Wadi Bayhan
- Wadi Markhah
- Wadi Makhyah (Wadi as Sidarah)
- Wadi Qinab
- Wadi Aywat al Manahil
- Wadi Armah
- Wadi Dahyah
- Wadi Arabah
- Wadi Rakhawt
- Wadi Mitan
- Wadi Shihan
- Wadi Hat

== See also ==
- List of wadis of Oman
- Wildlife of Yemen
