= Wadi Ar Ruqub =

Wadi of Yemen

Wadi Ar Ruqub is a wadi of Yemen, It flows past the village of Al Khayalah. The wadi flooded in October 2008, affecting this village. It is located at 13°57′47″N 45°55′38″E.

== See also ==
- List of wadis of Yemen
