= Ahwar =

- Location in Yemen
- Coordinates: 13°31′N 46°42′E
- Country: Yemen
- Governorate: Abyan Governorate
- District: Ahwar district
- Time zone: UTC+3 (Yemen Standard Time)

Ahwar (Arabic: أحور) a town in south-central Yemen. It is located at around 13°31′0″N 46°42′0″E. It is the capital of the Lower Aulaqi. Wadi Ahwar flows into the sea near here.
