= Al-Ghubra =

Al-Ghubra الغبرة
- Suburb
- Location in Oman
- Coordinates: 23°34′48″N 58°24′0″E
- Country: Oman
- Region: Muscat
- Time zone: UTC+4 (+4)

Al Ghubra (also Al-Ghubrah or Ghubrah; Arabic: الغبرة) is a suburb of Muscat, the capital city of the Sultanate of Oman. It is a developing town with a number of malls, hospitals, schools, hotels, and many local businesses. There are many expatriates among the locals. The beach is a long expanse of sand dunes. There are many schools here which are owned by different communities. The town is well planned and known for its lake park designed especially with a walk-path and children's playground. Al-Ghubra is Oman's most popular shopping destination, with Muscat Grand Mall Oman Avenue Mall and Panorama Mall being two of the options. Also in this area, there are many hotels, restaurants, and coffee shops. Indian, Pakistani, Chinese, Italian, Arabic, Continental, and Latin cuisines are available here.
