= Ahwar district =

Ahwar district مديرية أحور
- District
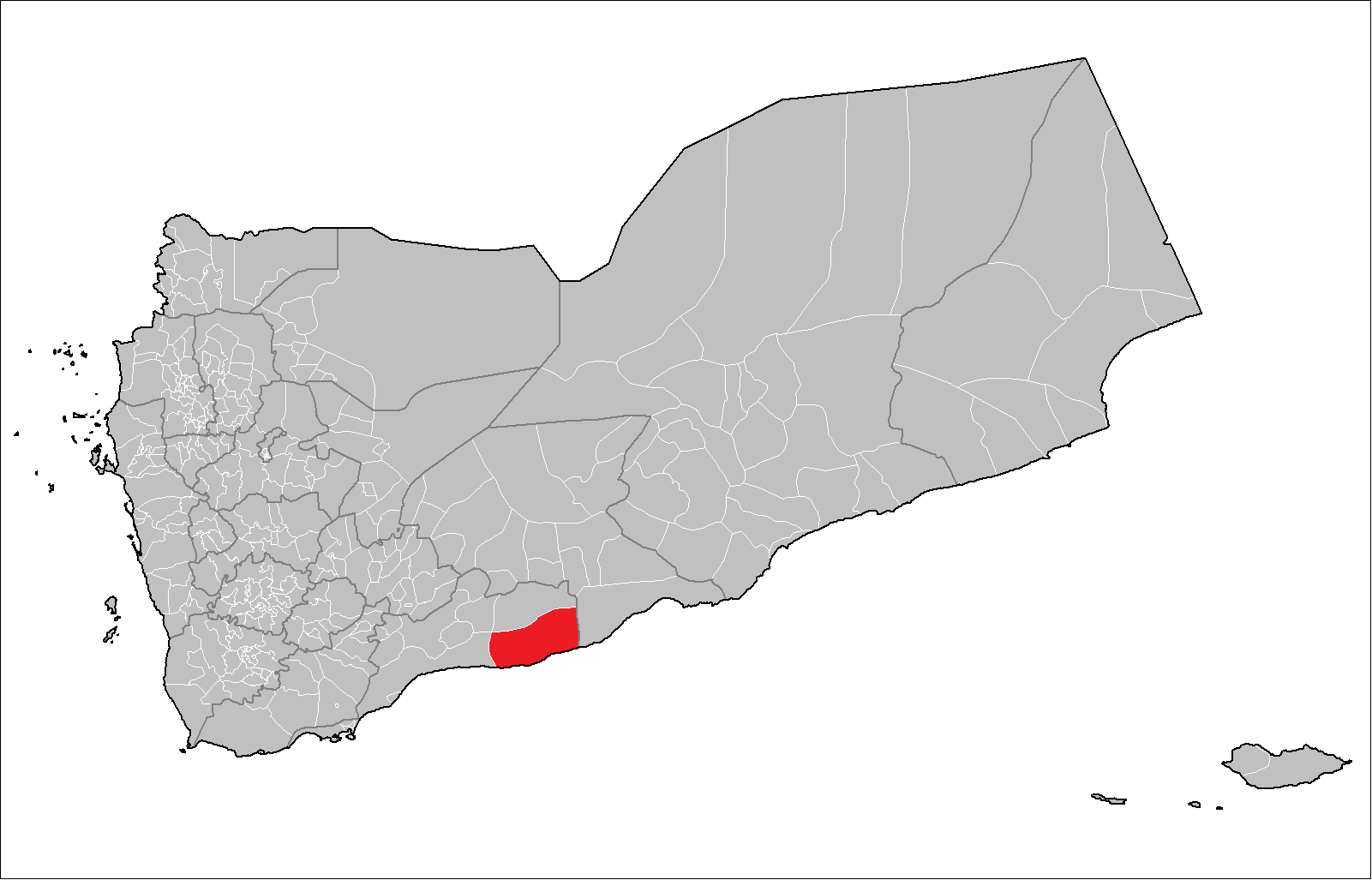

- Location within Yemen
- Coordinates: 13.68528°N 46.75556°E
- Country: Yemen
- Governorate: Abyan
- Seat: Ahwar

Area
  - Total: 4,384 km^{2} (1,693 sq mi)
- Elevation: 230 m (750 ft)

Population (2004)
  - Total: 25,246
- Time zone: UTC+3 (Yemen Standard Time)

Ahwar district is a district of the Abyan Governorate, Yemen. Its centre is the city of Al-Luha. In the 2004 Yemeni census the district had a population of 25,246 inhabitants.
