= Tropical cyclones in 1996 =

Year boundaries
- First system: Bonita
- Formed: January 3, 1996
- Last system: Phil
- Dissipated: January 16, 1997

Strongest system
- Name: Daniella
- Lowest pressure: 915 mbar (hPa); 27.02 inHg

Longest lasting system
- Name: Phil
- Duration: 21 days

Year statistics
- Total systems: 128
- Named systems: 90
- Total fatalities: 3,530 (5)
- Total damage: $16.96 billion (1996 USD)
Related articles
- 1996 Atlantic hurricane season
- 1996 Pacific hurricane season
- 1996 Pacific typhoon season
- 1996 North Indian Ocean cyclone season
- 1995–96 South-West Indian Ocean cyclone season
- 1996–97 South-West Indian Ocean cyclone season
- 1995–96 Australian region cyclone season
- 1996–97 Australian region cyclone season
- 1995–96 South Pacific cyclone season
- 1996–97 South Pacific cyclone season

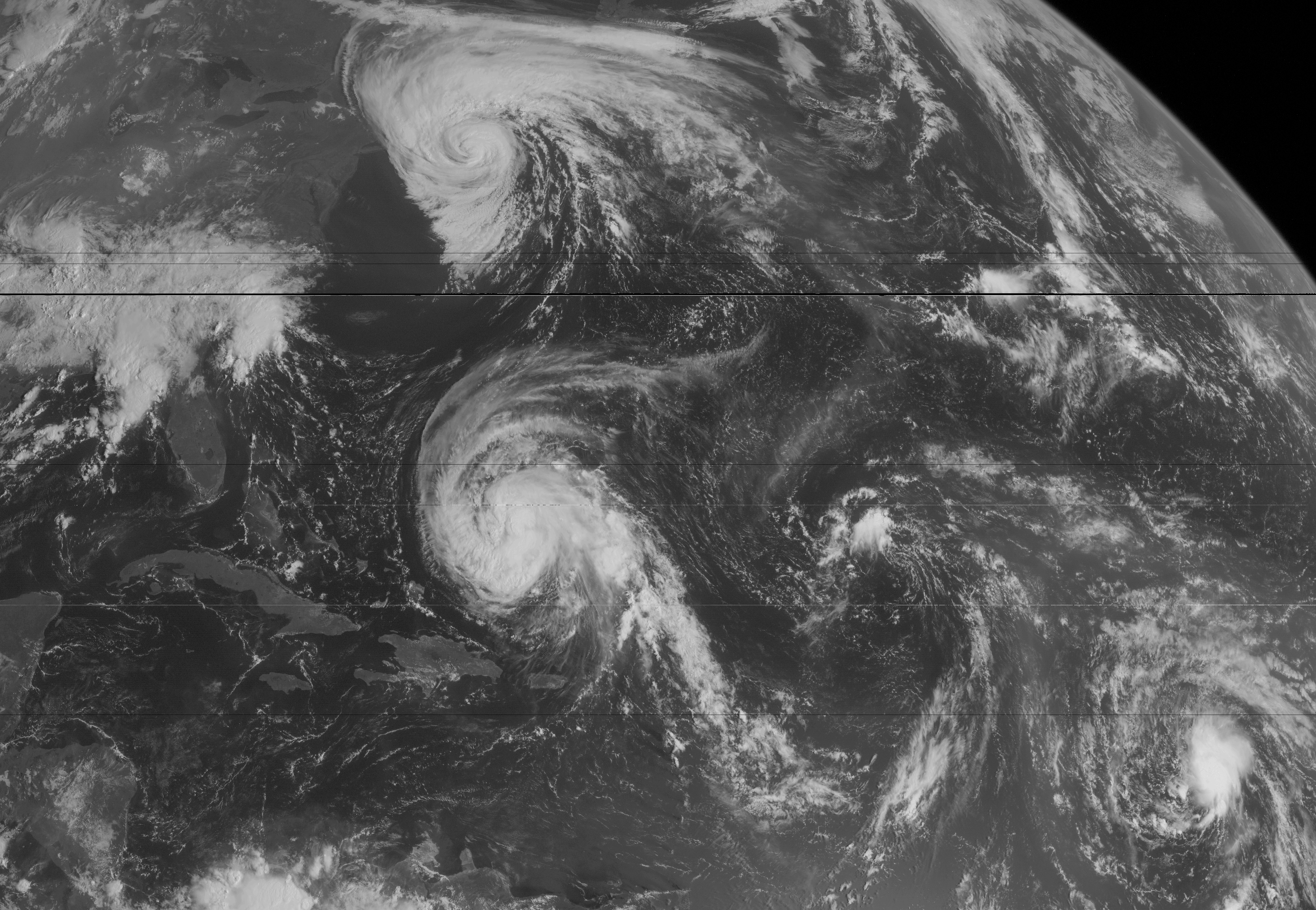
Edouard (top), Fran (bottom left), the remnants of Gustav (right of Fran), and the disturbance that would become Hortense (bottom right of Gustav) on September 2.

During 1996, tropical cyclones formed within seven different tropical cyclone basins, located within various parts of the Atlantic, Pacific, and Indian Oceans. During the year, a total of 139 tropical cyclones (of which 2 are unofficial) formed in bodies of water known as tropical cyclone basins. 90 of them were named by various weather agencies when they attained maximum sustained winds of 35 knots (65 km/h; 40 mph). The strongest tropical cyclone of the year was Cyclone Daniella, peaking with a pressure of 915 hPa (27.02 inHg) in the open waters of the Indian Ocean. Hurricane Fran and Typhoon Herb tie for the costliest storm of the year, both with a damage cost of $5 billion. The deadliest tropical cyclone of the year was the 1996 Andhra Pradesh cyclone, which was blamed for over 1,000 fatalities as it directly affected the state of Andhra Pradesh in India. Five Category 5 tropical cyclones were formed in 1996. The accumulated cyclone energy (ACE) index for the 1996 (seven basins combined), as calculated by Colorado State University was 960 units.

== Global atmospheric and hydrological conditions ==
The weak La Niña prevailed until the end of the year, which made the waters of the Pacific and Atlantic oceans warmer than usual. Despite the fact that the 1995–96 La Niña was not a powerful occurrence, it recharged much of the ocean heat released from nearly two decades of El Niño events.

== Summary ==
=== North Atlantic Ocean ===
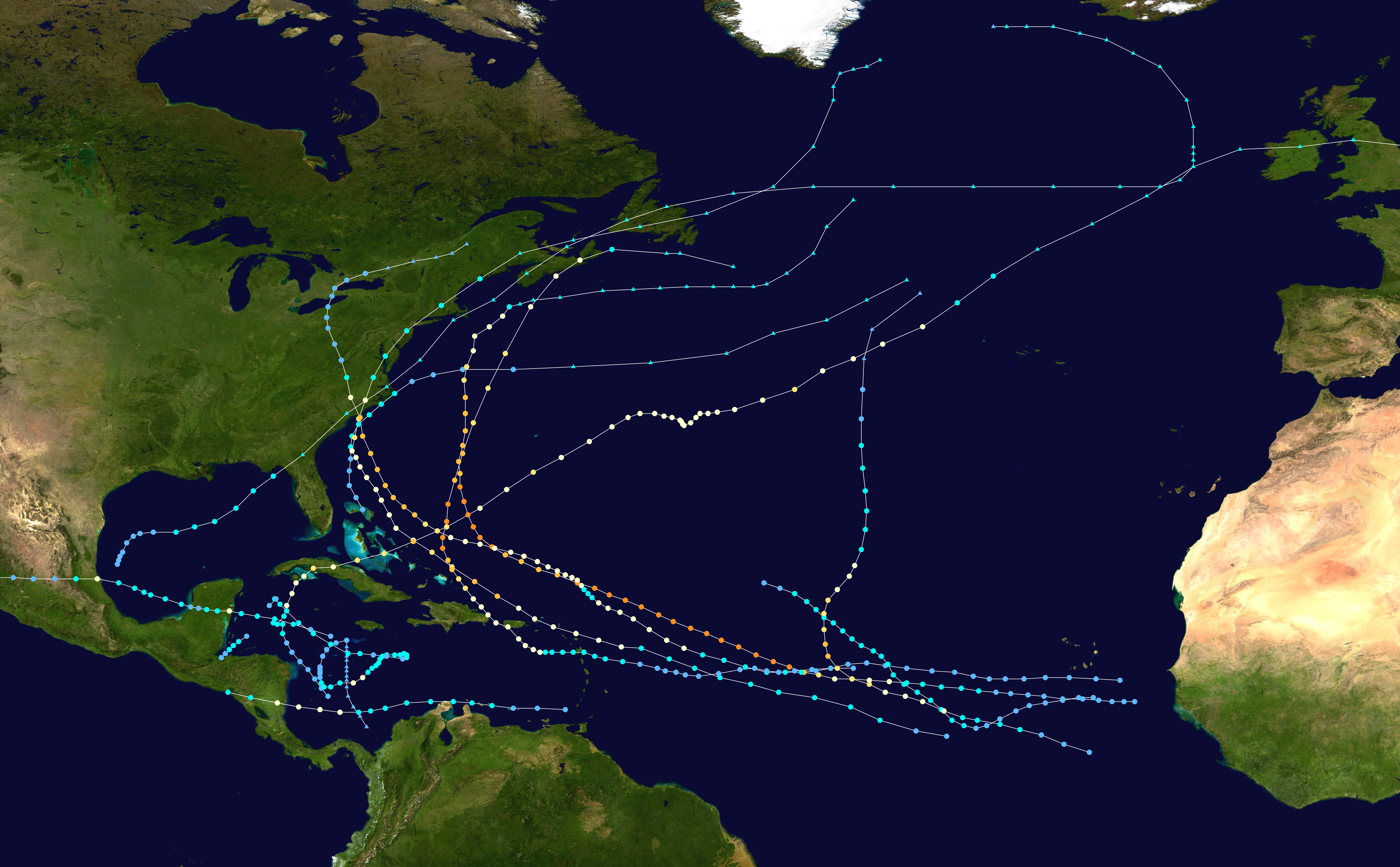
1996 Atlantic hurricane season summary map

An average Atlantic hurricane season features 12 tropical storms, 6 hurricanes, and 3 major hurricanes, and features an Accumulated Cyclone Energy (ACE) count of 106. In the season, all of them were reached, featuring 13 tropical storms, 9 hurricanes, and 6 major hurricanes, with an ACE total of 166. A rare subtropical storm also formed in mid-September, that affected the Northeastern United States and the nearby Eastern Canada.

The season had the most major hurricanes since 1950 and the season's first tropical cyclone, Tropical Storm Arthur, developed on June 17, while the final cyclone, Hurricane Marco dissipated on November 26. The most intense hurricane, Edouard, was a powerful Cape Verde-type hurricane that affected portions of the Mid-Atlantic states and New England. The season featured nine tropical cyclone landfalls, including six hurricanes, one of which was a major hurricane.

The four most notable tropical cyclones of the season were hurricanes Bertha, Cesar, Fran, and Hortense. Bertha made landfall as a Category 2 hurricane on the coast of North Carolina, causing a total of 12 deaths and $335 million (1996 USD) in damage. Hurricane Fran made landfall in the same general area a little over a month later as a Category 3 hurricane, causing 37 deaths and $5 billion in damage. Hurricane Cesar developed in the east Caribbean during late-July and crossed Nicaragua into the eastern Pacific as a strong tropical storm several days later, at which time it earned the name Douglas. The system produced strong winds and flooding, leading to 113 deaths and $202.96 million in damage. Finally, Hurricane Hortense formed in the eastern Atlantic during the month of September and crossed Hispaniola and Puerto Rico, causing 39 direct deaths and $158 million in damage. Collectively, the tropical cyclones of the 1996 Atlantic hurricane season caused $6.52 billion in damage and 256 deaths.

=== Eastern and Central Pacific Ocean ===
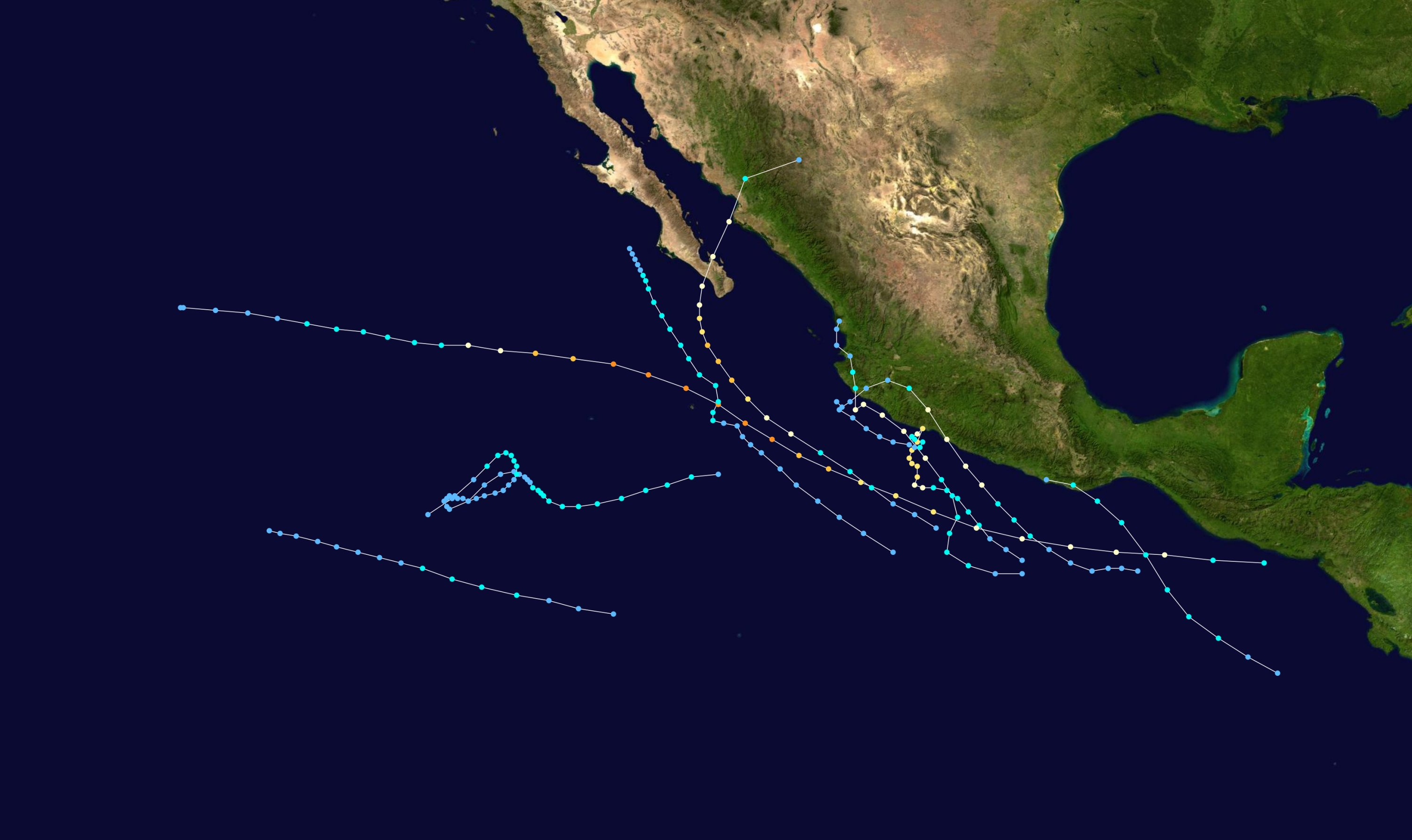
1996 Pacific hurricane season summary map

An average Pacific hurricane season features 15 tropical storms, 9 hurricanes, and 4 major hurricanes, and features an Accumulated Cyclone Energy (ACE) count of 132. In the season, the statistics fell below the average list, with 9 tropical storms, 5 hurricanes, and 2 major hurricanes.

It was a below-average season; however, it recorded a four Pacific hurricanes striking Mexico. In addition, one Atlantic hurricane, Hurricane Cesar, crossed into this zone from the Atlantic Ocean and was renamed Douglas. None of the systems in the eastern north Pacific crossed 140°W and entered the central Pacific. The last time that happened was in the 1979 season.

In the central north Pacific, one tropical depression formed. In addition, a depression crossed the dateline from the western Pacific before dissipating in this basin. None of these two systems reached tropical storm strength. In addition, data from the Joint Typhoon Warning Center, on September 1, Tropical Depression Rick crossed the International Date Line, entering into CPHC's area of responsibility; however, this storm was not included into CPHC database. The storm eventually became extratropical on September 3 over open waters.

In terms of the number of storms, the season was below average. Despite this, there were a large number of landfalls. Of note is the fact that three tropical cyclones approached close to, or made landfall on, Mexico during a ten-day span from June 23 to July 3. In all, a record-setting four hurricanes (Alma, Boris, Fausto, and Hernan) struck the coastline.

=== Western Pacific Ocean ===
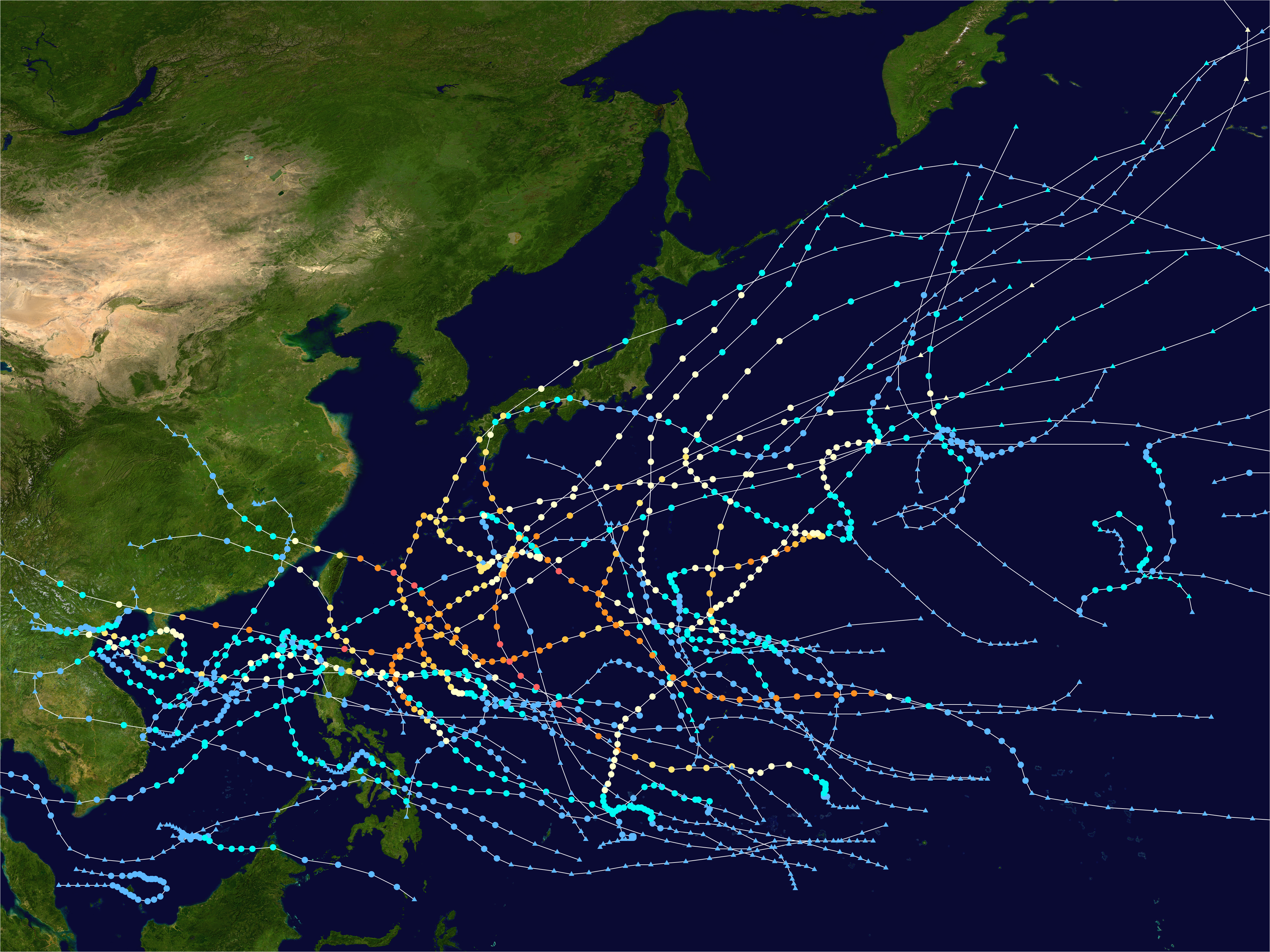
1996 Pacific typhoon season summary map

The average typhoon season lasts year-round, with the majority of the storms forming between May and October. An average Pacific typhoon season features 26 tropical storms, 16 typhoons, and 9 super typhoons (unofficial category). It also features an average Accumulated Cyclone Energy (ACE) count of approximately 294; the basin is typically the most active basin for tropical cyclone formation. The statistics were reached, except the number of super typhoons, which fell below the list. The season featured 30 tropical storms, 16 typhoons, and 6 super typhoons. The first tropical depression formed on January 12 and the last storm dissipated on December 27.

The strongest and the deadliest typhoon of the year was Typhoon Herb, which also became the largest, and the fourth-wettest tropical cyclone to affect Taiwan. It killed over 284 people and left $5 billion worth of damages as it affected the Ryukyu Islands, Taiwan, and China as a super typhoon. Frankie left 104 deaths as it passed near Vietnam. Marty formed over southern China and resulted in the deaths of 125 people as it affected the same country.

During most of the year, sea surface temperatures were moderately below normal near the equator, and were highest around 160° E from August to October, due to the prevailing La Niña. Overall, there were 30 named storms in the basin in 1996, which was slightly above the norm of 27. A total of 15 of the 30 storms became typhoons.

=== North Indian Ocean ===
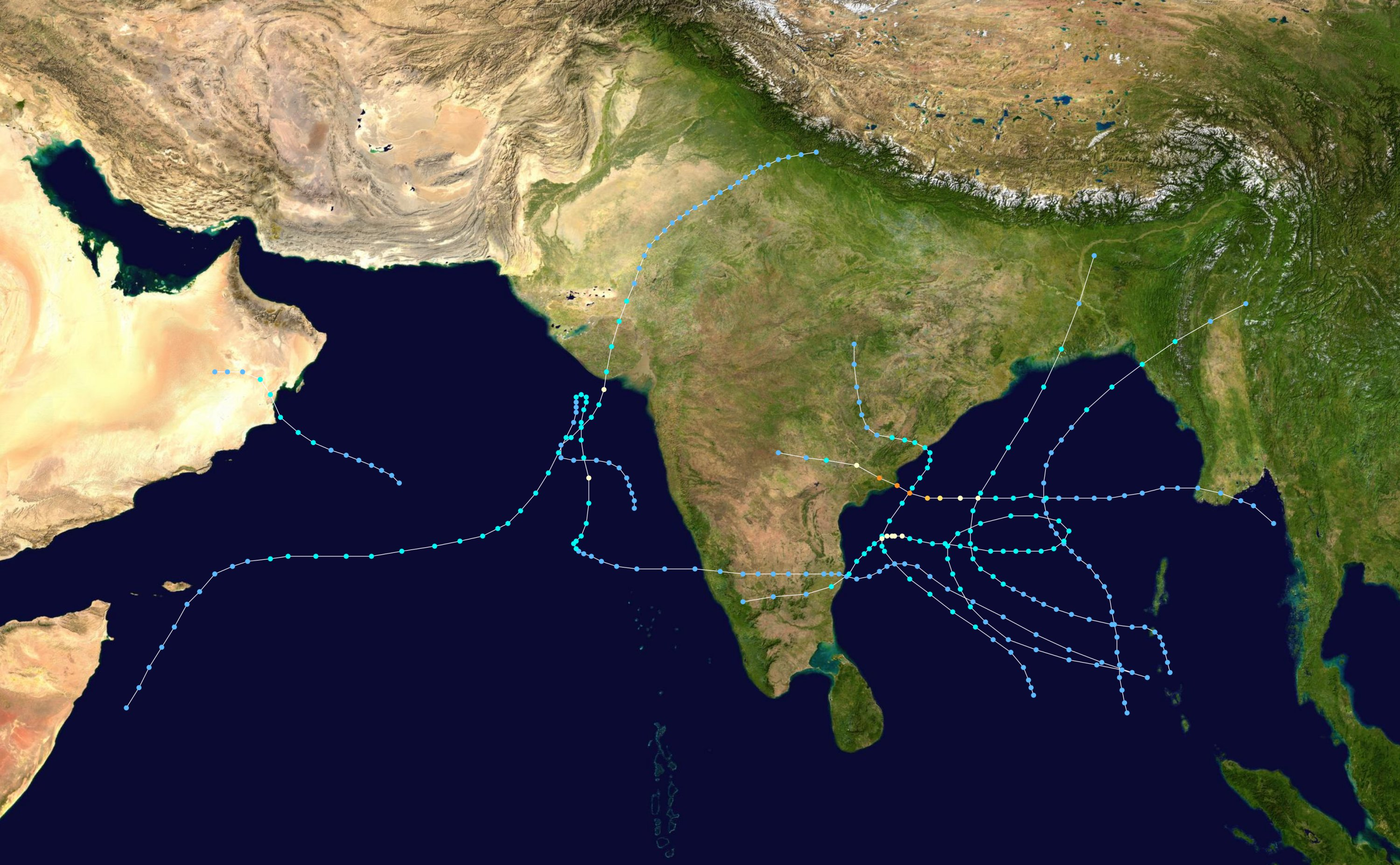
1996 North Indian Ocean cyclone season summary map

The 1996 North Indian Ocean cyclone season featured several deadly tropical cyclones, with over 2,000 people killed during the year. It was a slightly average season, featuring nine tropical cyclones, five cyclonic storms, four severe cyclonic storms, two very severe cyclonic storms; however, it has no super cyclonic storm.

The first system originated on May 7 in the Bay of Bengal, which is the body of water east of India; the storm developed in tandem with a storm in the southern hemisphere, and ultimately struck Bangladesh. Three storms formed in June. The first struck Oman and later caused devastating flooding in Yemen, killing 338 people and causing $1.2 billion in damage. (Note: All damage totals are valued as of 1996.) The other two storms struck opposite sides of India, collectively resulting in 226 deaths after causing widespread flooding. After a brief land depression in July and a weak depression in early October, the season featured four notable cyclones beginning in late October. A low-pressure area moved across southern India, killing 388 people before taking an unusual track in the Arabian Sea. At the end of October, a deep depression killed 14 people in Bangladesh. The strongest cyclone of the season was also the deadliest, killing 1,077 people when it struck Andhra Pradesh in early November. The final storm of the season executed a rare loop in the Bay of Bengal before weakening and striking southern India in early December, killing seven.

=== South-West Indian Ocean ===
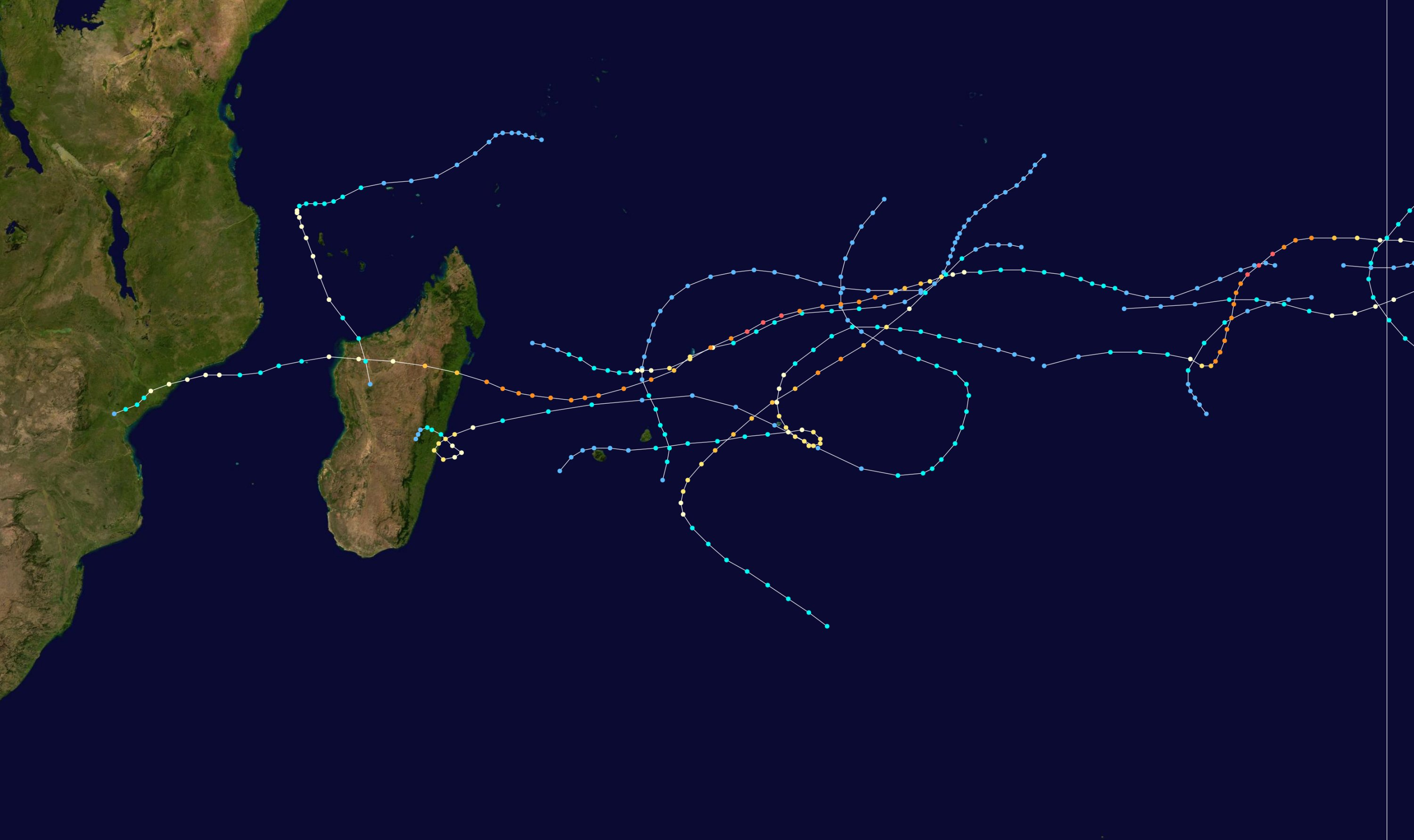
1995–96 South-West Indian Ocean cyclone season summary map

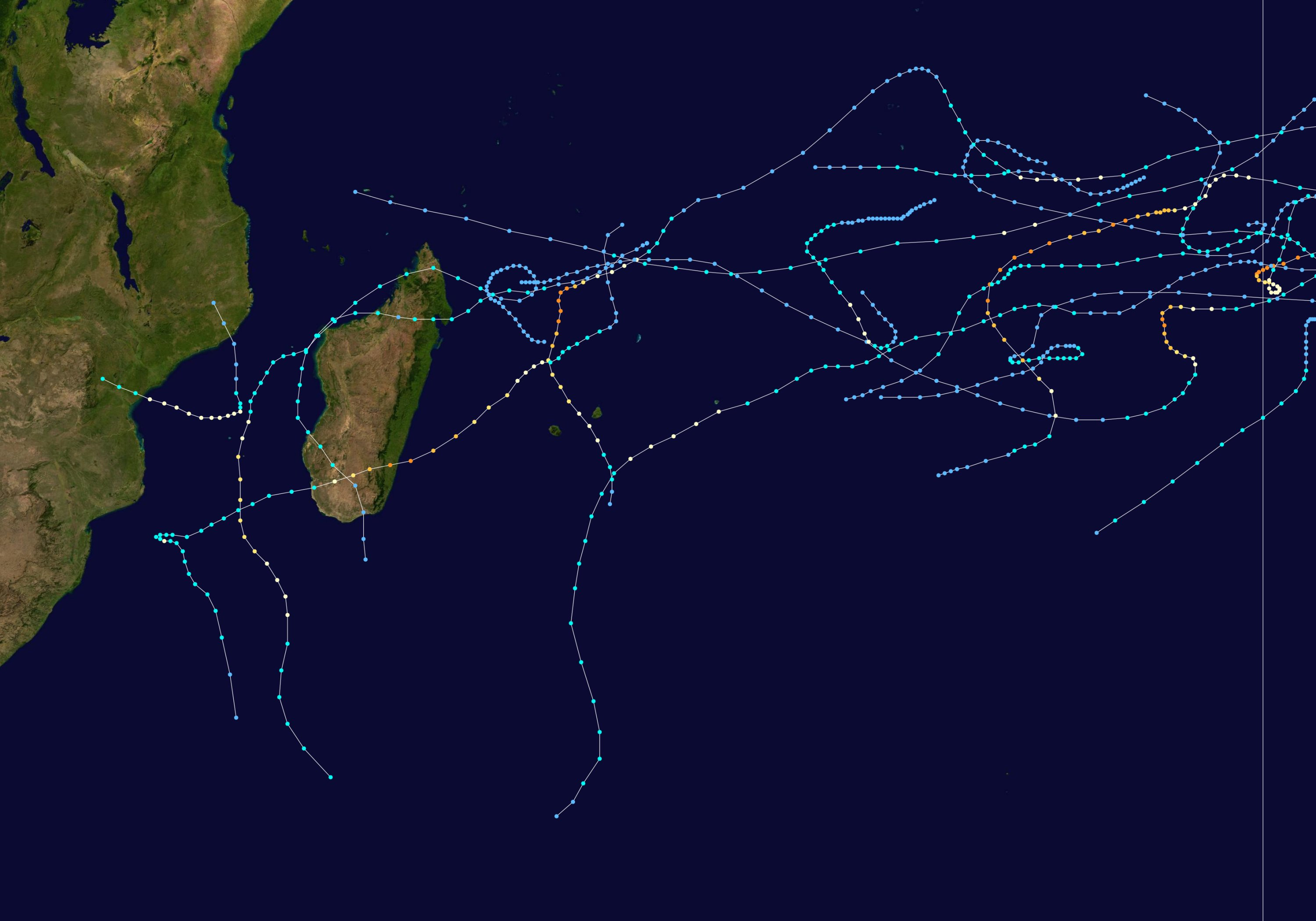
1996–97 South-West Indian Ocean cyclone season summary map

==== January–June ====
The 1995–96 South-West Indian Ocean cyclone season was a moderately active season that included Cyclone Bonita, which was the first known tropical cyclone to cross from the southern Indian Ocean into the southern Atlantic Ocean. The tropical activity lasted for about six months from the middle of November 1995 to early May 1996. The first storm, Intense Tropical Cyclone Agnielle, formed in the adjacent Australian basin on November 16 and later reached peak winds in the south-west Indian Ocean. The next named storm after Agnielle was Bonita, which formed in early January and killed 42 people. The basin was most active in February, with two tropical cyclones, or the equivalent of a minimal hurricane, as well as a severe tropical storm. The first of these three was Doloresse, which killed 67 people due to a shipwreck in the Comoros. The next storm was Cyclone Edwige, which caused heavy crop damage on Mauritius before looping along the east coast of Madagascar. In March, both Cyclone Flossy and Tropical Storm Guylianne passed near the Mascarene Islands, producing heavy rainfall and gusty winds.

Tropical activity continued through April and May, with two tropical cyclones in the former month. In early April, Tropical Cyclone Hansella moved over the island of Rodrigues, dropping more rainfall in 24 hours than the average monthly total. Later, Itelle became a rare April intense tropical cyclone but weakened before it approached St. Brandon island. The final storm of the season, Jenna, formed in the Australian region, briefly intensified into a minimal tropical storm in the south-west Indian Ocean, and proceeded to exit the basin on May 4 to end the season. In addition to the named storms, several tropical depressions were tracked, one of which in December dropped heavy rainfall on Réunion.

==== July–December ====
On August 16, a tropical disturbance started the season, an unusual start. It remained below tropical depression intensity before dissipating on August 19. Not a month later, on September 6, a tropical disturbance formed from a trough near the Chagos Archipelago, with the MFR classifying the system as Tropical Disturbance A2. Located in an unfavourable environment, the storm possessed gale-force winds before dissipating on September 10. Antoinette formed on October 10, passing near the northern Madagascar before weakening. Bellamine and Chantelle developed in the month of November, with the former crossing the basin from the Australian region as Tropical Cyclone Melanie before it was renamed. Daniella and Evrina formed in the month of December, with the latter becoming the strongest tropical cyclone of the year.

=== Australian region ===
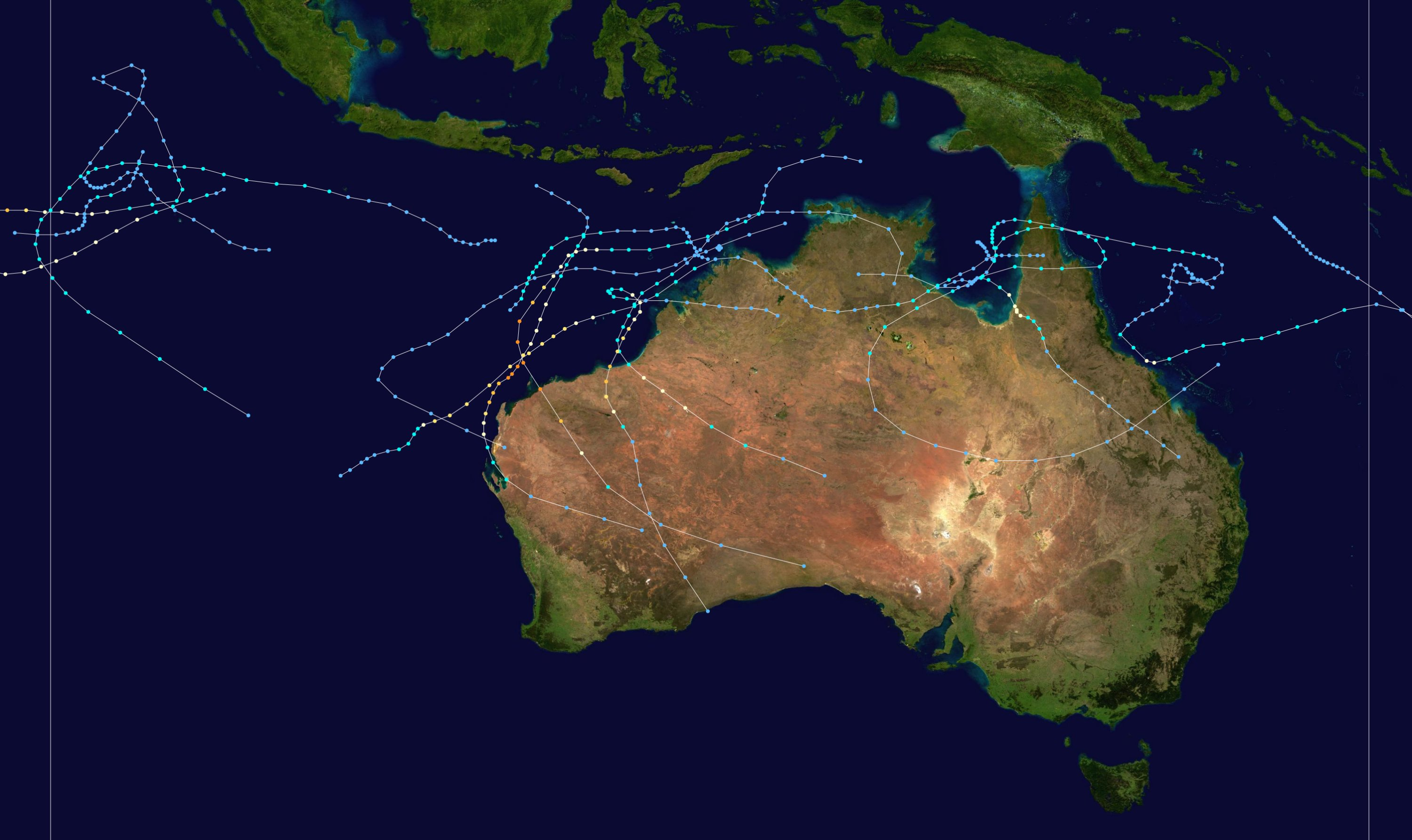
1995–96 Australian region cyclone season summary Map

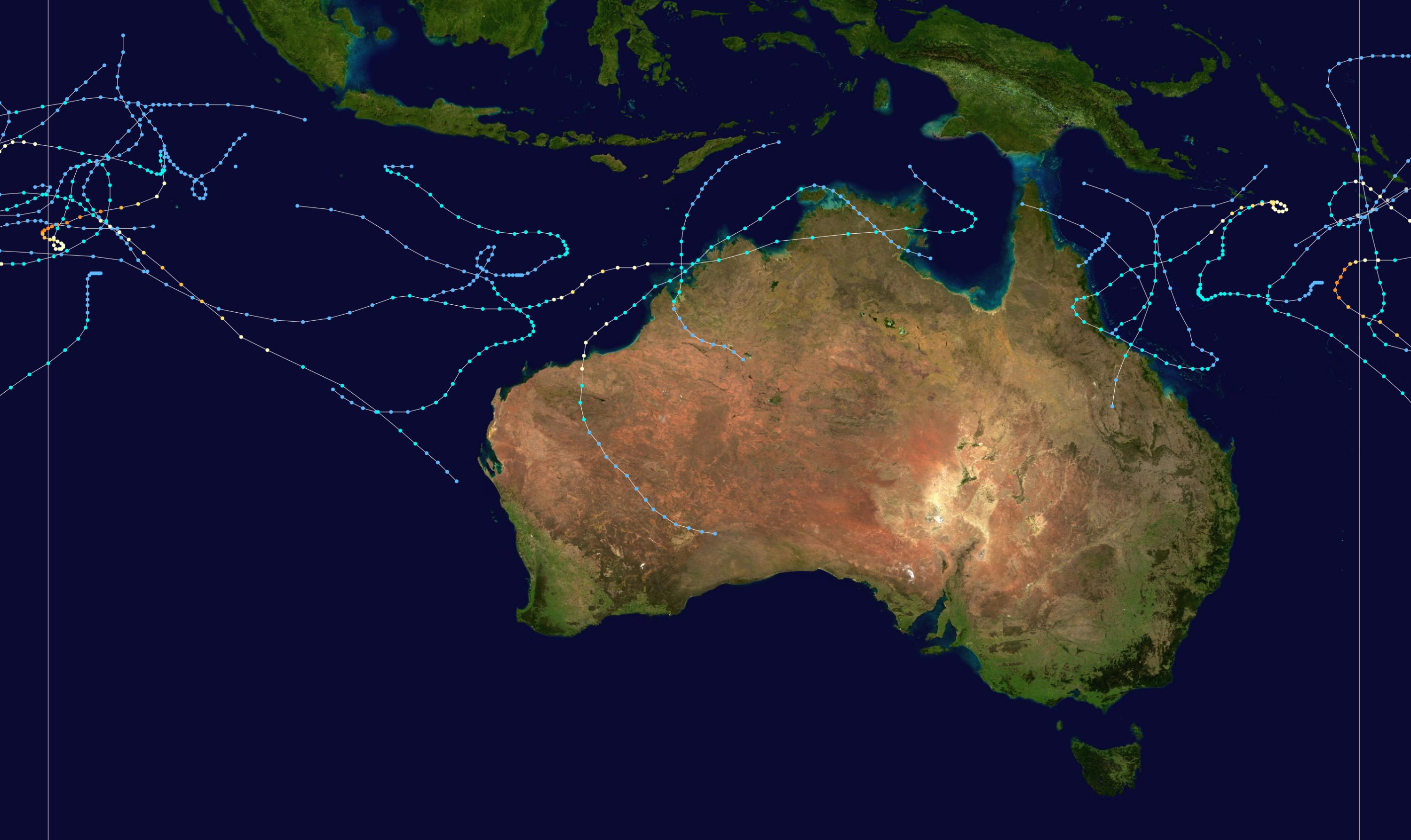
1996–97 Australian region cyclone season summary Map

==== January–June ====
The 1995–96 Australian region cyclone season was an active Australian cyclone season, with Western Australia experiencing a record number of landfalling intense storms in the Pilbara region. The season produced a total of 19 tropical cyclones, of which 14 developed into named storms and 9 reached severe tropical cyclone status. The strongest of the season was Severe Tropical Cyclone Olivia, which also produced the highest recorded wind gust on record of 408 km/h (254 mph). Though several systems impacted land, the general sparsity of population centres in Australia limits the scale of damage. One person was confirmed to have been killed and cumulative losses were estimated at A$77 million (US$58.5 million).

==== July–December ====
On July 9, a tropical low formed near the Cocos Islands, starting the season. It soon strengthened to Tropical Cyclone Lindsay before weakening and dissipating on July 13. Three months later, Cyclone Melanie formed near the Cocos (Keeling) Islands before crossing into the nearby South-West Indian Ocean basin, where it was renamed Bellamine. Nicholas, Ophelia, Fergus and Phil all developed on the month of December.

=== South Pacific Ocean ===
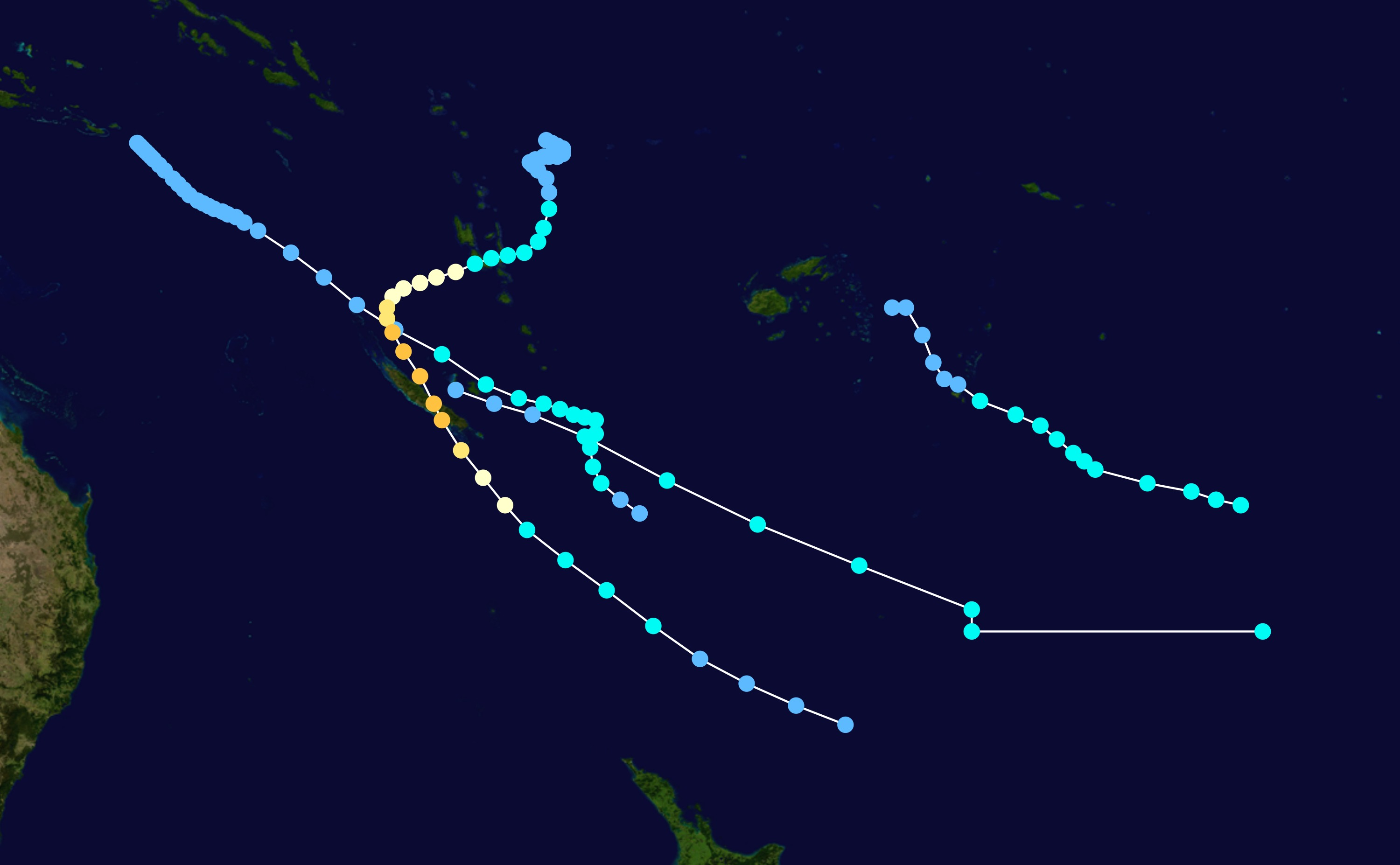
1995–96 South Pacific cyclone season summary Map

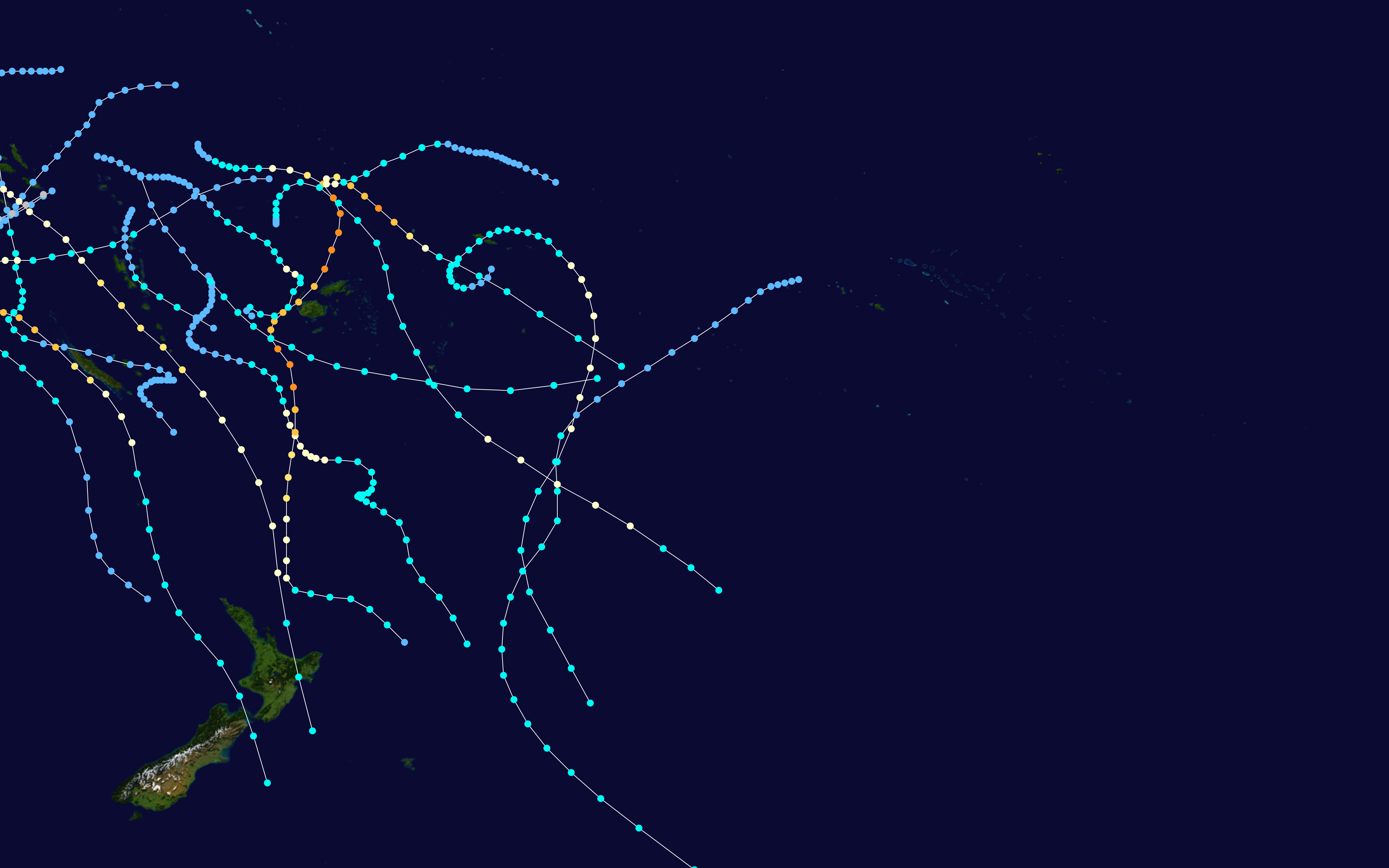
1996–97 South Pacific cyclone season summary Map

==== January–June ====
The 1995–96 South Pacific cyclone season was one of the least active South Pacific tropical cyclone season's on record, with only four tropical cyclones occurring within the South Pacific Ocean to the east of 160°E.

The first storm developed on January 12, while the last one dissipated on April 2. During the season the most intense tropical cyclone was Severe Tropical Cyclone Beti, which reached a minimum pressure of 935 hPa (27.61 inHg) as it affected New Caledonia. After the season ended Beti's name was the only name to be retired from the tropical cyclone naming lists and was replaced with Bune, after it inflicted over US$5.6 million worth of damage to Australia, Vanuatu, New Caledonia, and New Zealand.

==== July–December ====
Cyril started the season as a tropical low on November 23. It soon strikes New Caledonia, causing unknown damage. Fergus from the adjacent Australian region entered the basin on December 20, with the cyclone rapidly intensifying to a Category 3 severe tropical cyclone before dissipating on December 30.

=== South Atlantic Ocean ===
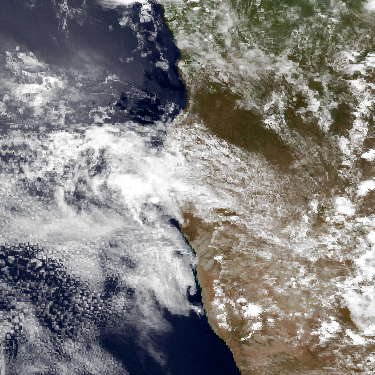
The remnants of Bonita off the coast of Angola on January 19.

According to the Zambia Meteorological Department, Cyclone Bonita moved off the coast of Angola and entered the South Atlantic Ocean on January 19, 1996. By the next day, the system had succumbed to cold waters and days of land interaction, dissipating completely. It was the first tropical cyclone known to have traversed southern Africa from the South-West Indian Ocean to the South Atlantic.

=== Mediterranean Sea ===
Three notable medicanes developed in the month of September. The first, in mid-September 1996, was a typical Mediterranean tropical cyclone that developed in the Balearic Islands region. At the time of the cyclone's formation, a powerful Atlantic cold front and a warm front associated with a large-scale low, producing northeasterly winds over the Iberian peninsula, extended eastward into the Mediterranean, while abundant moisture gathered in the lower troposphere over the Balearic channel. On the morning of 12 September, a disturbance developed off of Valencia, Spain, dropping heavy rainfall on the coast even without coming ashore. An eye developed shortly thereafter as the system rapidly traversed across Mallorca and Sardinia in its eastward trek. It made landfall upon the coast of southern Italy on the evening of 13 September with a minimum atmospheric pressure of 990 mbar (29 inHg), dissipating shortly after coming ashore, with a diameter of about 150 km (93 mi).

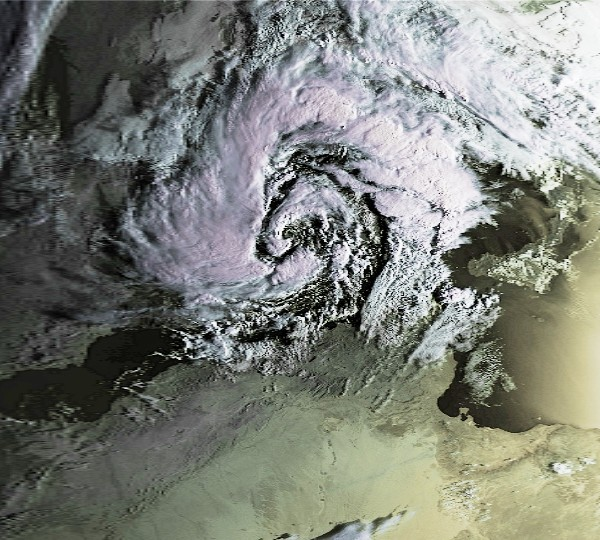
The second major Mediterranean tropical-like cyclone of 1996, while west of Italy on 7 October

The second of the three recorded Mediterranean tropical cyclones in 1996 formed between Sicily and Tunisia on 4 October, making landfall on both Sicily and southern Italy. The medicane generated major flooding in Sicily. In Calabria, wind gusts of up to 108 km/h (67 mph) were reported in addition to severe inundation.

The third major Mediterranean tropical cyclone of that year formed north of Algeria, and strengthened while sweeping between the Balearic Islands and Sardinia, with an eye-like feature prominent on satellite. The storm was unofficially named Cornelia. The eye of the storm was distorted and disappeared after transiting over southern Sardinia throughout the evening of 8 October, with the system weakening as a whole. On the morning of October 9, a smaller eye emerged as the system passed over the Tyrrhenian Sea, gradually strengthening, with reports 100 km (62 mi) from the storm's center reporting winds of 90 km/h (56 mph). Extreme damage was reported in the Aeolian Islands after the tropical cyclone passed north of Sicily, though the system dissipated while turning southward over Calabria. Overall, the lowest estimated atmospheric pressure in the third medicane was 998 mbar (29.5 inHg). Both October systems featured distinctive spiral bands, intense convection, high sustained winds, and abundant precipitation.

A medicane was observed from 10 to 13 December.

== Systems ==
=== January ===
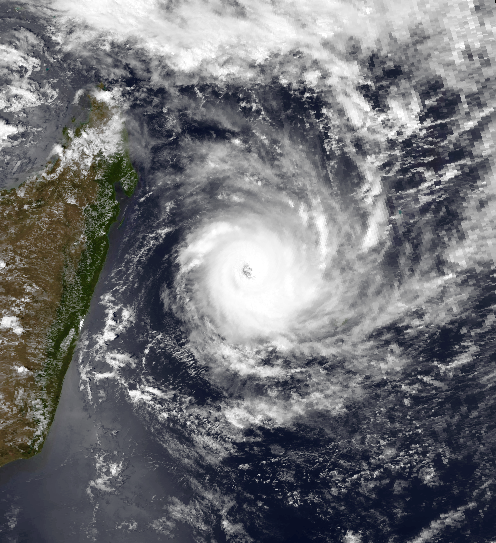
Cyclone Bonita

Tropical cyclones formed in January 1996
Storm name	Dates active	Max wind km/h (mph)	Pressure (hPa)	Areas affected	Damage (USD)	Deaths	Refs
Bonita	January 3–15	185 (115)	920	Madagascar, Mozambique, Zimbabwe, Zambia, Angola	Unknown	> 42	
Barry	January 4–7	185 (115)	950	Northern Territory, Queensland	Unknown	None	
Hubert–Coryna	January 7–12	150 (90)	955	None	None	None	
Yasi	January 12–19	85 (50)	987	Fiji, Tonga	Minor	None	
TD	January 12	Unknown	1008	Philippines	None	None	
Celeste	January 26–29	130 (80)	965	Queensland	None	1	
Isobel	January 27 – February 1	65 (40)	995	Northern Territory	None	None	
Jacob	January 27 – February 8	155 (100)	955	Northern Territory, Western Australia	Unknown	Unknown	

=== February ===
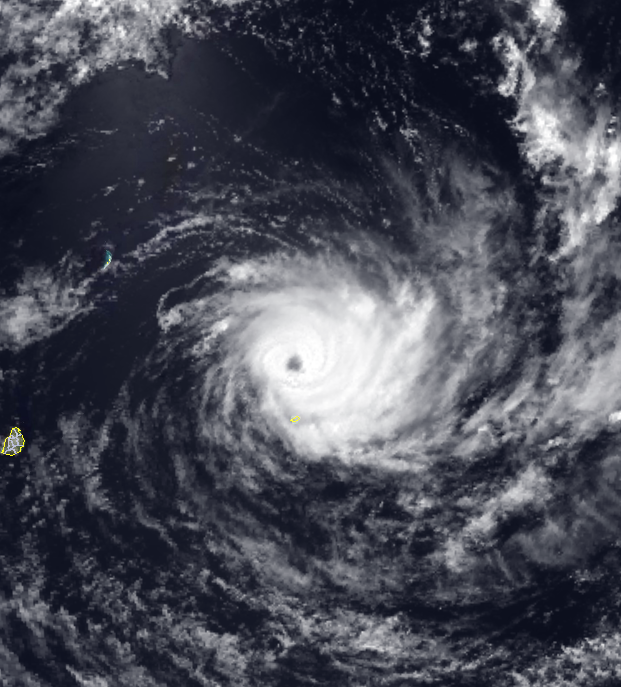
Cyclone Flossy

Tropical cyclones formed in February 1996
Storm name	Dates active	Max wind km/h (mph)	Pressure (hPa)	Areas affected	Damage (USD)	Deaths	Refs
12S	February 5 – 10	65 (40)	997	None	None	None	
TL	February 8 – 11	55 (35)	997	None	None	None	
Doloresse	February 12 – 20	95 (60)	977	Comoros, Madagascar, Mozambique	Unknown	> 67	
TD	February 12 – 14	Unknown	1002	None	None	None	
TL	February 14 – 17	55 (35)	996	None	None	None	
Dennis	February 15 – 18	75 (45)	990	Papua New Guinea, Queensland	Unknown	Unknown	
Edwige	February 19 – 29	150 (90)	945	Mascarene Islands, Madagascar	Minor	Unknown	
TD	February 22 – 24	Unknown	Unknown	Fiji	Minor	None	
Flossy	February 25 – March 6	150 (90)	945	Réunion	None	None	
01W (Asiang)	February 28 – March 1	65 (40)	998	Philippines	None	None	

=== March ===
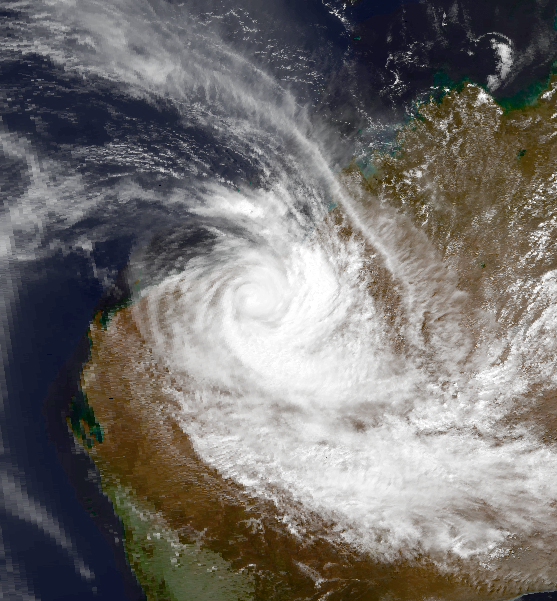
Cyclone Kirsty

Tropical cyclones formed in March 1996
Storm name	Dates active	Max wind km/h (mph)	Pressure (hPa)	Areas affected	Damage (USD)	Deaths	Refs
Kirsty	March 7–14	185 (115)	935	Western Australia	Unknown	Unknown	
Ethel	March 8–13	110 (70)	980	Queensland, Northern Territory	$57 million	Unknown	
Zaka	March 9–11	65 (40)	995	New Caledonia	Minor	None	
Atu	March 10–13	85 (50)	987	New Caledonia	Minor	None	
Guylianne	March 17–25	65 (40)	992	Mauritius	None	None	
Beti	March 21–28	165 (105)	935	Australia, Vanuatu, New Caledonia, New Zealand	$5.3 million	2	

=== April ===
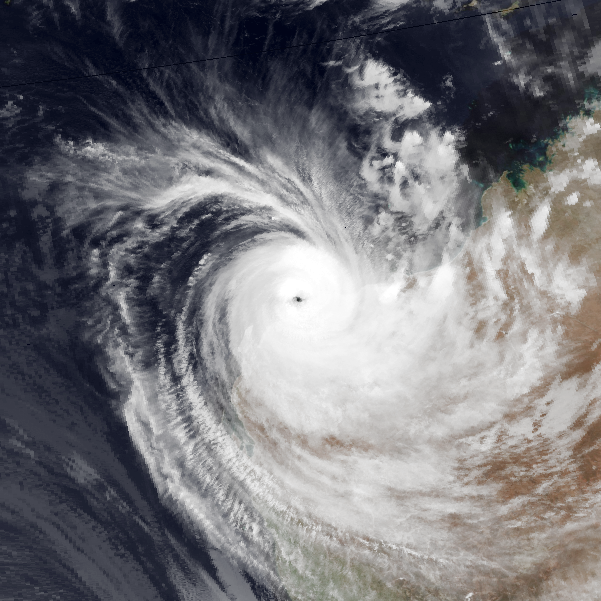
Cyclone Olivia

Tropical cyclones formed in April 1996
Storm name	Dates active	Max wind km/h (mph)	Pressure (hPa)	Areas affected	Damage (USD)	Deaths	Refs
Ann (Biring)	April 1 – 10	65 (40)	1000	Caroline Islands, Philippines	None	None	
Hansella	April 2 – 10	120 (75)	962	Mascarene Islands	None	None	
Olivia	April 3 – 12	195 (120)	925	Western Australia, Northern Territory	> $47.5 million	None	
Itelle	April 6 – 19	175 (110)	925	Mascarene Islands	None	None	
27S	April 12 – 19	55 (35)	1000	None	None	None	
03W	April 25 – 26	45 (30)	1004	Borneo	None	None	
Jenna	April 30 – May 6	95 (60)	984	None	None	None	
TL	April 30 – May 5	55 (35)	997	None	None	None	

=== May ===
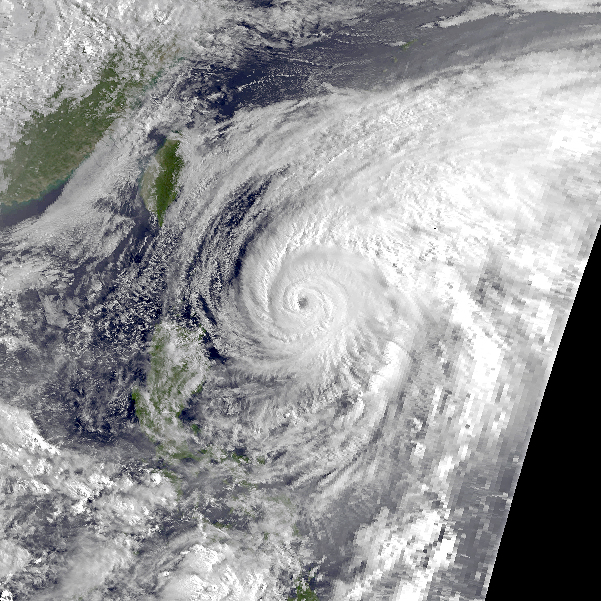
Typhoon Bart

Tropical cyclones formed in May 1996
Storm name	Dates active	Max wind km/h (mph)	Pressure (hPa)	Areas affected	Damage (USD)	Deaths	Refs
BOB 01	May 7 – 8	55 (35)	1000	Bangladesh, Myanmar, India	Unknown	1	
Bart (Konsing)	May 8 – 18	175 (110)	930	Philippines, Guam, Mariana Islands	None	None	
One-E	May 13 – 16	85 (50)	1000	None	None	None	
Two-E	May 15 – 19	55 (35)	1006	None	Nonme	None	
Cam (Ditang)	May 18 – 24	75 (45)	994	Philippines, Taiwan, Ryukyu Islands	None	None	

=== June ===
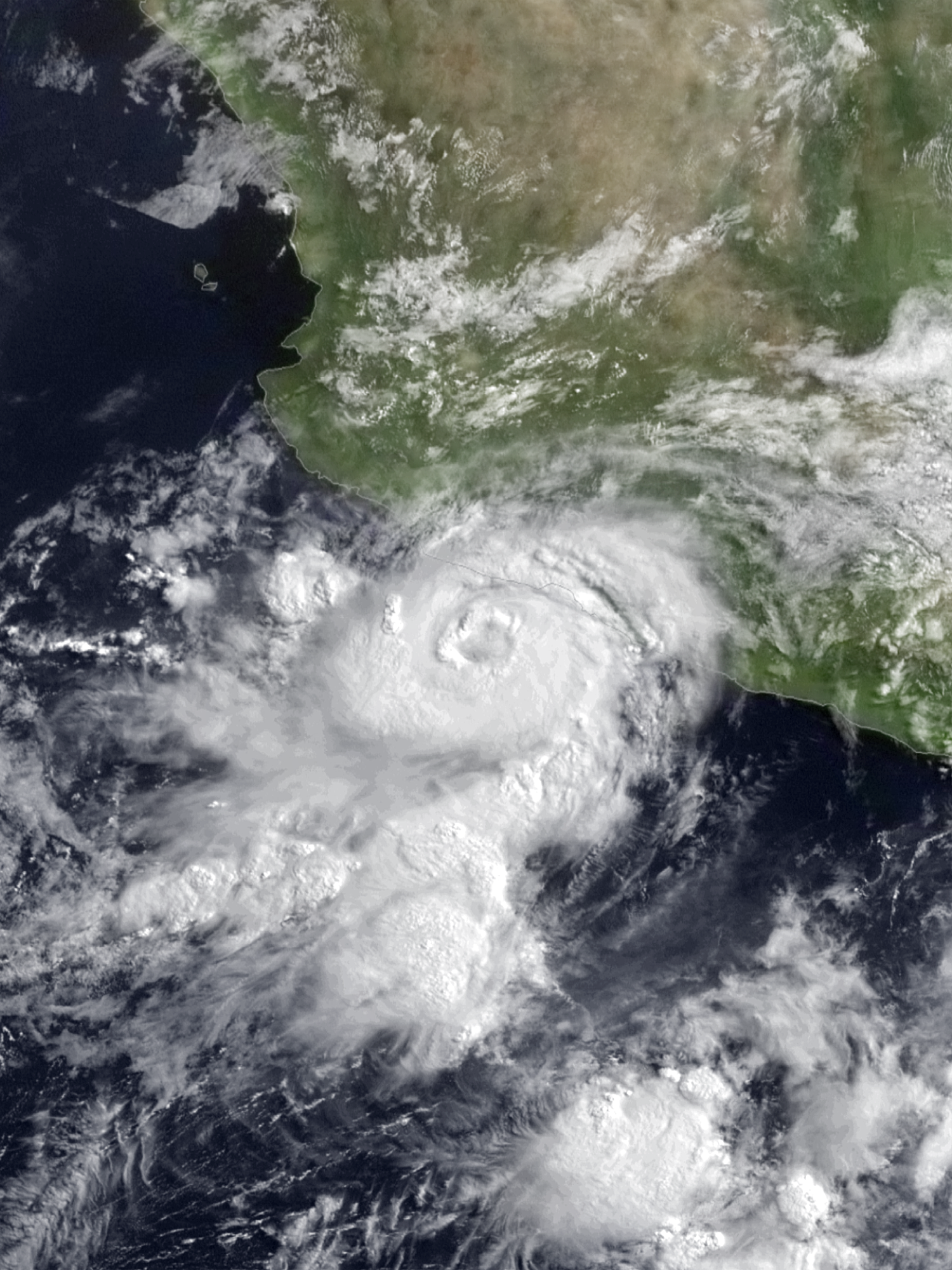
Hurricane Alma

Tropical cyclones formed in June 1996
Storm name	Dates active	Max wind km/h (mph)	Pressure (hPa)	Areas affected	Damage (USD)	Deaths	Refs
02A	June 11–12	75 (45)	994	Oman, Yemen, Somalia	$1.2 billion	341	
BOB 02	June 12–16	85 (50)	992	India	$23.5 million	179	
TD	June 13–15	Unknown	1004	South China	None	None	
Arthur	June 16–21	75 (45)	1004	North Carolina	$1 million	None	
ARB 01	June 17–20	110 (70)	972	India	$5.6 million	47	
Alma	June 20–27	165 (105)	969	Mexico	Unknown	26	
Boris	June 27 – July 1	150 (90)	979	Mexico	Unknown	10	

=== July ===
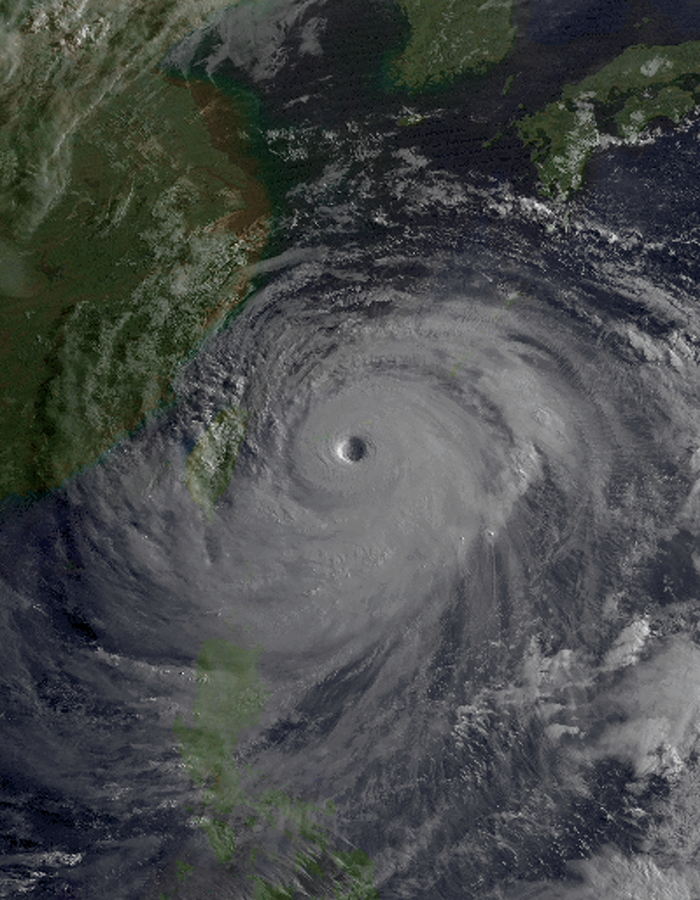
Typhoon Herb

Tropical cyclones formed in July 1996
Storm name	Dates active	Max wind km/h (mph)	Pressure (hPa)	Areas affected	Damage (USD)	Deaths	Refs
Cristina	July 1–3	110 (70)	991	Central America, Mexico	Unknown	13	
Six-E	July 4–6	55 (35)	1003	None	None	None	
Dan	July 5–12	120 (75)	970	Japan, Kamchatka Peninsula	Unknown	None	
Bertha	July 5–14	185 (115)	960	Leeward Islands, Puerto Rico, North Carolina, Mid-Atlantic States, New England	$335 million	12	
Lindsay	July 9–13	75 (45)	990	None	None	None	
Eve	July 13–24	155 (100)	940	Japan, Ryukyu Islands	Unknown	None	
Frankie (Edeng)	July 20–25	95 (60)	975	China, Vietnam	$200 million	104	
Gloria (Gloring)	July 21–28	120 (75)	965	Philippines, Taiwan, China	$20 million	23	
Herb (Huaning)	July 21 – August 3	175 (110)	925	Ryūkyū Islands, Taiwan, People's Republic of China	$5 billion	284	
Cesar	July 24–28	140 (85)	985	Colombia, Central America, Mexico	$203 million	113	(Note: Cesar and Douglas are the same storm.)
Douglas	July 28 – August 6	215 (130)	946	Mexico, Baja California Sur	None	None	(Note: Cesar and Douglas are the same storm.)
LAND 01	July 26–28	45 (30)	Unknown	India	None	None	
Ian	July 28–29	75 (45)	1002	Mariana Islands	None	None	
Joy	July 29 – August 6	100 (65)	980	None	None	None	
TD	July 31	Unknown	1004	Caroline Islands	None	None	

=== August ===
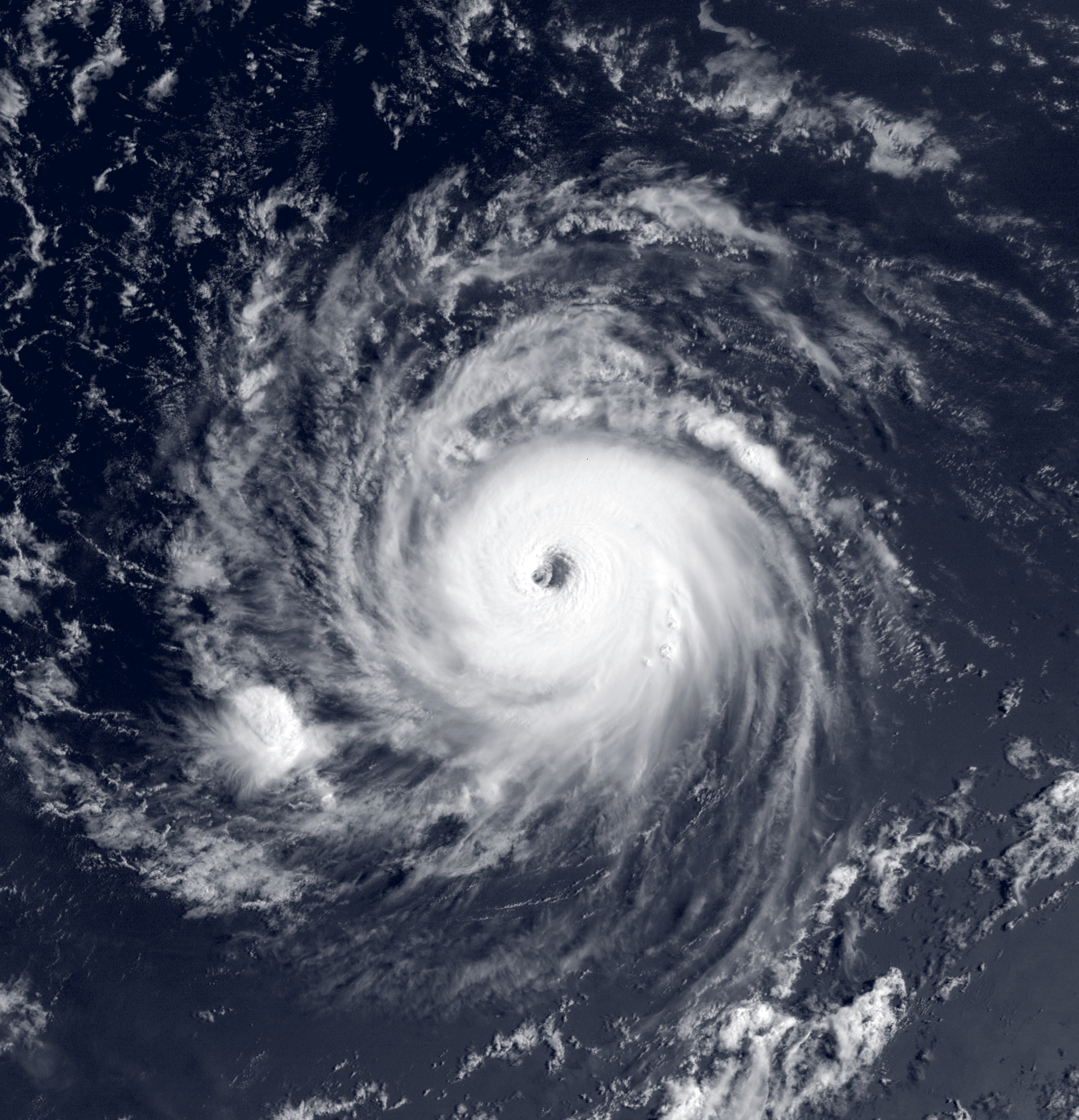
Hurricane Edouard

Tropical cyclones formed in August 1996
Storm name	Dates active	Max wind km/h (mph)	Pressure (hPa)	Areas affected	Damage (USD)	Deaths	Refs
TD	August 2–3	Unknown	998	South China	None	None	
Kirk (Isang)	August 3–15	140 (85)	955	Ryukyu Islands, Japan	Unknown	2	
Lisa	August 5–9	55 (35)	996	China	None	None	
TD	August 7	Unknown	1002	None	None	None	
15W	August 12–16	55 (35)	998	None	None	None	
TD	August 12	Unknown	1002	South China	None	None	
Marty	August 12–16	95 (60)	998	South China, Vietnam	$198 million	125	
17W	August 14–16	55 (35)	1008	None	None	None	
A1	August 16–19	55 (35)	Unknown	None	None	None	
Niki (Lusing)	August 17–23	120 (75)	970	Philippines, Vietnam, South China	$65 million	Unknown	
TD	August 17	Unknown	1008	None	None	None	
Dolly	August 19–25	130 (80)	989	Belize, Mexico, Texas	Unknown	14	
Edouard	August 19 – September 3	230 (145)	933	Mid-Atlantic States, New England, Atlantic Canada	$20 million	2	
Orson	August 20 – September 3	140 (85)	955	None	None	None	
TD	August 21–22	Unknown	1008	None	None	None	
Piper	August 22–26	75 (45)	996	None	None	None	
Fran	August 23 – September 8	195 (120)	946	South Carolina, North Carolina, Virginia, West Virginia, Maryland, Pennsylvania	$5 billion	22	
TD	August 25–26	Unknown	1008	None	None	None	
Gustav	August 26 – September 2	75 (45)	1002	None	None	None	
21W	August 26–27	45 (30)	1008	None	None	None	
Rick	August 28 – September 2	65 (40)	1004	None	None	None	
Elida	August 30 – September 6	65 (40)	994	Baja California Peninsula	Unknown	6	

=== September ===
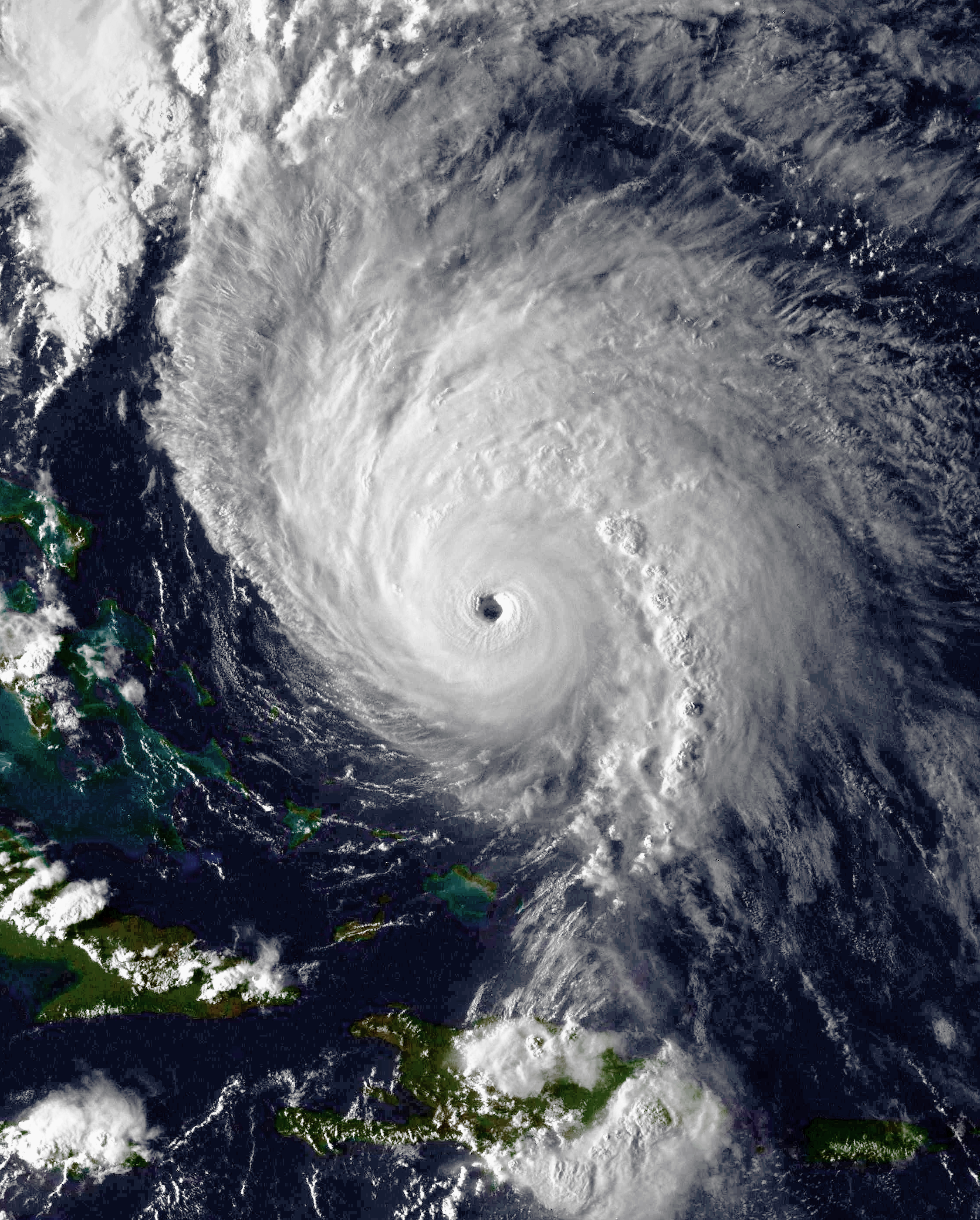
Hurricane Hortense

Tropical cyclones formed in September 1996
Storm name	Dates active	Max wind km/h (mph)	Pressure (hPa)	Areas affected	Damage (USD)	Deaths	Refs
Sally (Maring)	September 2–9	150 (90)	940	Philippines, China, Vietnam	$1.5 billion	140	
Hortense	September 3–15	220 (140)	935	Lesser Antilles, Puerto Rico, Dominican Republic, Turks and Caicos Islands, Atlantic Canada	$158 million	39	
A2	September 6–10	65 (40)	Unknown	None	None	None	
24W (Ningning)	September 10–14	85 (50)	996	Philippines, South China, Vietnam	None	None	
Fausto	September 10–14	195 (120)	955	Revillagigedo Islands, Mexico, Baja California Peninsula, Southwestern United States	$800 thousand	1	
Violet (Osang)	September 11–23	165 (105)	935	Ryukyu Islands, Japan	Unknown	Unknown	
Unnamed	September 11–13	Unknown	990	Spain, Balearic Islands, Italy	Unknown	Unknown	
Tom	September 12–20	130 (80)	965	None	None	None	
Willie	September 15–23	100 (65)	985	South China, Vietnam	Unknown	38	
One-C	September 15–20	55 (35)	Unknown	None	None	None	
Yates	September 21 – October 1	165 (105)	935	Mariana Islands	None	None	
Zane (Paring)	September 23 – October 3	150 (90)	950	Ryukyu Islands, Marshall Islands, Mariana Islands	None	None	
Isidore	September 24 – October 1	185 (115)	960	None	None	None	
Genevieve	September 27 – October 9	85 (50)	999	None	None	None	
Hernan	September 30 – October 4	140 (85)	980	Mexico, Texas	Unknown	1	

=== October ===
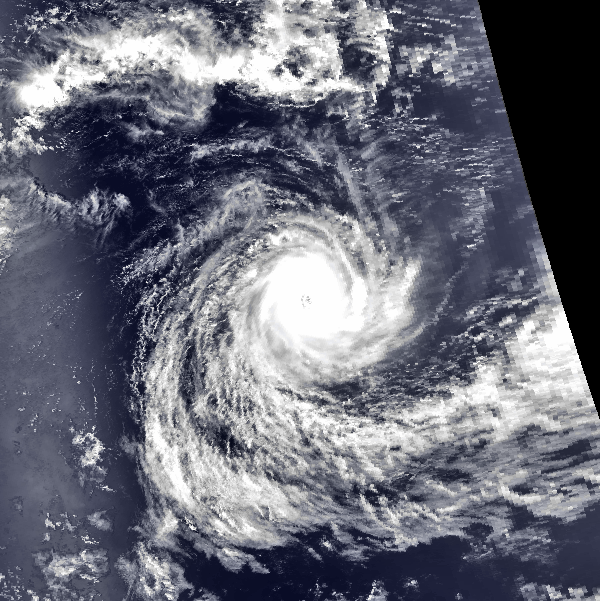
Cyclone Bellamine

Tropical cyclones formed in October 1996
Storm name	Dates active	Max wind km/h (mph)	Pressure (hPa)	Areas affected	Damage (USD)	Deaths	Refs
BOB 03	October 1–3	45 (30)	Unknown	India	Unknown	22	
Josephine	October 4–8	110 (70)	981	Southeastern United States, Mid-Atlantic, Northeastern United States, Atlantic Canada	$130 million	3	
Unnamed	October 4–6	> 108 (67)	Unknown	Italy	Unknown	None	
Cornelia	October 6–11	> 90 (56)	998	Algeria, Balearic Islands, Italy, Aeolian Islands	Unknown	Unknown	
Abel (Reming)	October 10–17	95 (60)	1002	Philippines, Vietnam	$4.3 million	8	
Kyle	October 11–12	85 (50)	1001	Central America, Mexico	Minimal	None	
Beth (Seniang)	October 11–22	110 (70)	975	Philippines, Vietnam	Unknown	1	
Lili	October 14–27	185 (115)	960	Central America, Cuba, Florida, Bahamas, Bermuda, Ireland, Great Britain	$662 million	22	
31W	October 15–16	45 (30)	1006	Mariana Islands	None	None	
Antoinette	October 15–21	120 (75)	965	None	None	None	
Carlo	October 20–26	130 (80)	965	Mariana Islands	None	None	
ARB 02	October 22–28	110 (70)	976	Andhra Pradesh, Tamil Nadu, Gujarat	$128.5 million	388	
34W	October 24–30	55 (35)	1000	Philippines, Vietnam, Thailand, Borneo	None	None	
BOB 04	October 27–29	55 (35)	991	India, Bangladesh	Unknown	19	
Melanie–Bellamine	October 28 – November 11	175 (110)	925	None	None	None	

=== November ===
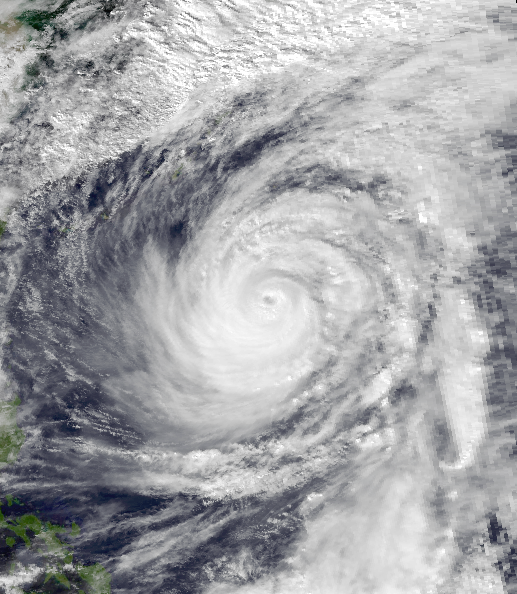
Typhoon Dale

Tropical cyclones formed in November 1996
Storm name	Dates active	Max wind km/h (mph)	Pressure (hPa)	Areas affected	Damage (USD)	Deaths	Refs
35W	November 1–3	75 (45)	998	Philippines, Vietnam, Laos	$138 million	60	
Dale (Ulpiang)	November 3–13	165 (105)	930	Guam, Mariana Islands, Caroline Islands	$3.5 million	None	
ARB 02	November 4–7	145 (90)	988	India	$602 million	1077	
Ernie (Toyang)	November 4–16	75 (45)	992	Philippines, Taiwan, Vietnam, Thailand	$5.1 million	24	
38W	November 5–8	65 (40)	1000	None	None	None	
Twelve-E	November 7–11	55 (35)	1003	None	None	None	
39W	November 7–8	55 (35)	1006	Philippines, Taiwan	None	None	
Marco	November 16–26	120 (75)	983	Cuba, Hispaniola, Central America, Jamaica, Florida	$8.2 million	15	
Chantelle	November 23–30	95 (60)	980	None	None	None	
Cyril	November 23–26	85 (50)	987	New Caledonia, Solomon Islands, Vanuatu	Unknown	Unknown	
40W	November 24–26	45 (30)	1002	Mariana Islands, Philippines	None	None	
BOB 06	November 27 – December 7	120 (75)	967	Andaman and Nicobar Islands, India	Unknown	7	

=== December ===
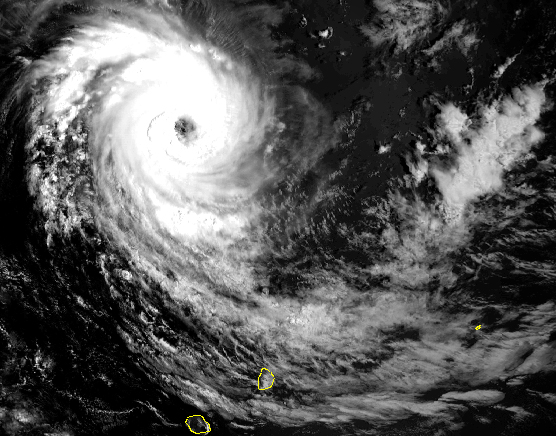
Cyclone Daniella

Tropical cyclones formed in December 1996
Storm name	Dates active	Max wind km/h (mph)	Pressure (hPa)	Areas affected	Damage (USD)	Deaths	Refs
Daniella	December 2–10	185 (115)	915	Mascarene Islands	Unknown	3	
Elvina	December 8–16	85 (50)	985	None	None	None	
Unnamed	December 10–13	Unknown	Unknown	Unknown	None	None	
Nicholas	December 12–15	85 (50)	985	Western Australia, Timor	Unknown	Unknown	
Ophelia	December 13–19	100 (65)	980	Christmas Islands	None	None	
41W	December 14–20	55 (35)	1000	Borneo, Malaysia, Singapore	None	None	
Fergus	December 20–30	150 (90)	955	Solomon Islands, New Caledonia, Vanuatu, New Zealand	$2 million	None	
Fern	December 21–30	110 (70)	975	Yap	$3 million	None	
Greg	December 24–27	85 (50)	1002	Philippines, Borneo	$280 million	127	
Phil	December 26 – January 16	110 (70)	975	Northern Territory, Western Australia	Unknown	Unknown	

== Global effects ==
There are a total of nine tropical cyclone basins, seven are seasonal and two are non-seasonal, thus all eight basins except the Mediterranean are active. In this table, data from all these basins are added.

Season name		Areas affected	Systems formed	Named storms	Hurricane-force tropical cyclones	Damage (1996 USD)	Deaths	Ref
North Atlantic Ocean (Note: The wind speeds for this tropical cyclone/basin are based on the Saffir Simpson Scale which uses 1-minute sustained winds.)		Southeastern United States, Leeward Islands, Greater Antilles, Mid-Atlantic states, New England, Curaçao, Central America, South America, East Mexico, Nova Scotia, Midwestern United States, Lucayan Archipelago, Atlantic Canada, Gulf Coast of the United States, Ireland, United Kingdom	13	13	9	$6.52 billion	253 (3)	
Eastern and Central Pacific Ocean		Southwestern Mexico, Revillagigedo Islands, Western Mexico, Central America, Baja California Peninsula, Northwest Mexico	12	8	4	>$800,000	44 (2) (Note: The number in the bracket indicates indirect deaths.)	
Western Pacific Ocean (Note: Only systems that formed either before or on December 31, 1996 are counted in the seasonal totals.)		Philippines, Caroline Islands, Taiwan, South China, Vietnam, Mariana Islands, Ryukyu Islands, China, Cambodia, Laos, Wake Island, Malaysia, Bomeo	52	30	21	$8.39 billion	1,047	
North Indian Ocean (Note: The wind speeds for this tropical cyclone/basin are based on the IMD Scale which uses 3-minute sustained winds.)		India, Bangladesh, Oman, Yemen, Somalia, Gujarat, Andhra Pradesh, Tamil Nadu	9	5	4	$1.93 billion	2,075	
South-West Indian Ocean	January – June (Note: Only systems that formed either on or after January 1, 1996 are counted in the seasonal totals.) (Note: The wind speeds for this tropical cyclone are based on Météo-France, which uses wind gusts.)	Madagascar, Mozambique, Zimbabwe, Zambia, Angola, Comoro, Tanzania, Madagascar, Mauritius, Réunion, Rodrigues	9	7	6	Unknown	109	
South-West Indian Ocean	July – December	Seychelles, Madagascar, Mozambique, Tanzania, Malawi	6	5	2	None	None	
Australian region	January – June	Christmas Island, Western Australia, Queensland, Cape York, Northern Territory, South Australia	15	11	6	$104.5 million	None	
Australian region	July – December	Christmas Island, Northern Australia, Western Australia	5	5	2	—N/a	—N/a	—N/a
South Pacific Ocean	January – June	Fiji, Tonga, New Caledonia, Vanuatu, New Zealand	4	4	1	$5.3 million	2	
South Pacific Ocean	July – December	Solomon Islands, Vanuatu, New Caledonia, New Zealand	3	2	1	—N/a	—N/a	
Worldwide		(See above)	128 (Note: The sum of the number of systems in each basin will not equal the number shown as the total. This is because when systems move between basins, it creates a discrepancy in the actual number of systems.)	90	56	$16.96 billion	3,530 (5)	

== See also ==
- Tropical cyclones by year
- List of earthquakes in 1996
- Tornadoes of 1996

== Notes ==
^{2} Only systems that formed either on or after January 1, 1996 are counted in the seasonal totals.
^{3} Only systems that formed either before or on December 31, 1996 are counted in the seasonal totals.
^{4} The wind speeds for this tropical cyclone/basin are based on the IMD Scale which uses 3-minute sustained winds.
^{5} The wind speeds for this tropical cyclone/basin are based on the Saffir Simpson Scale which uses 1-minute sustained winds.
^{6}The wind speeds for this tropical cyclone are based on Météo-France which uses wind gusts.
