= Nallam Venkataramayya =

Indian physician and surgeon (born 1943)

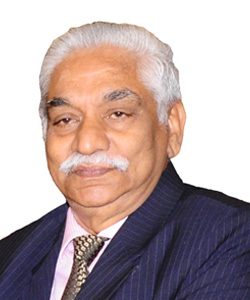
- Born: 4 September 1943 (age 83)
- Education: M.B.B.S, JIPMER, Pondicherry, M.S (general surgery)
- Years active: 1971–present
- Medical career
- Profession: Physician, director, clinic nallam
- Sub-specialties: Surgery
- Research: Cheek cancer

Nallam Venkataramayya (Telugu: నాలం వెంకటరామయ్యా) (born 4 September 1943) is an Indian physician and surgeon. He is the director of Clinic Nallam, a medical center in Pondicherry, India. In 2008 he was awarded as a knight of the Legion of Honour by the French Republic.

== Early life ==
Venkataramayya was born in Mummidivaram on 4 September, 1943. His father, Satiyanarayana, was a surgeon in the Government Hospital at Pondicherry and the founder and president of the Andhra Maha Sabha in Pondicherry. Venkataramayya received his primary education in the French Cluny School and graduated in mathematics from a French college in 1961. He later studied medicine at Pondicherry Medical College and graduated in 1966. After a short stay at the Jawaharlal Institute of Postgraduate Medical Education and Research (JIPMER) he did his post graduation M.S (General Surgery) at Stanley Medical College in 1969–71.

== Career ==
Venkataramayya joined Government general hospital as a surgeon in July 1971. He was selected by the Government of India for specialized training in cancer and was sent to France in 1979. He worked for one year in the Cancer Institute in Villejuif, France, where he completed his thesis in the treatment of cheek cancer.

== Posts and honors ==
He is actively involved in many philanthropical ventures which involve running free dispensaries in his own Clinic Nallam and organising medical camps. In November 1996, he led a delegation consisting of representatives from both the French Consulate and Andhra Maha Sabha to distribute essential commodities to the people of Yanam and the surrounding regions, who were ravaged by the Cyclone. He has also written a book on History of Medicine in French India which is available in French and English.

- Recipient of Highest French Award “Chevalier de la légion d’honneur”
- President, Friends of Pondicherry Heritage Association, Pondicherry.
- Life president, Andhra Maha Sabha, Pondicherry.
- Surgical expert of French Consulate, Pondicherry Médecin Counseil
- President, Private Hospitals Association, Pondicherry.
- Co-researcher of Genetic studies of Polymorphisms in ten non-insulin-dependent diabetes mellitus candidate genes in Tamil Indians from Pondicherry.

== Controversy ==
On 10 November 2023, the National Consumer Disputes Redressal Commission found that one of Venkatrammayya's patients suffered owing to the "erroneous and negligent operation" by him and Sreeramamurthy, in 1991, leaving behind a nut and bolt in her abdomen after performing an abdominal hysterectomy and upheld the order of the Puducherry State Commission, awarding compensation to the patient.
