= October 1996 India cyclone =

North Indian Ocean cyclone in 1996

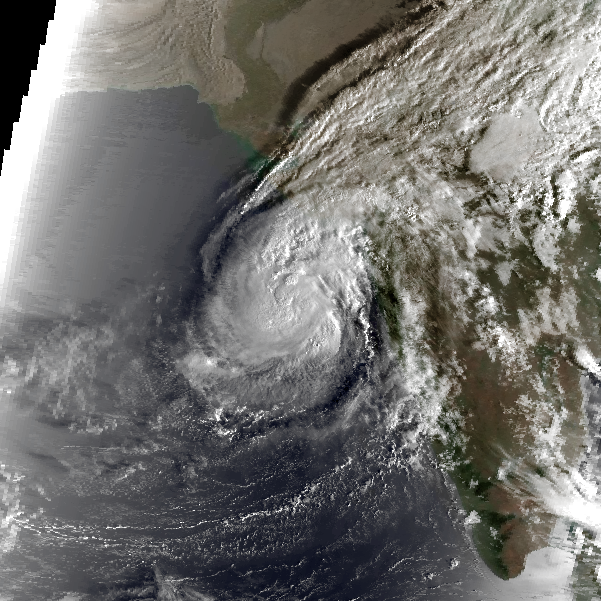
- Satellite image of the cyclone near peak intensity off the west coast of India

Meteorological history
- Formed: 22 October 1996
- Dissipated: 28 October 1996

Severe cyclonic storm
- 3-minute sustained (IMD)
- Highest winds: 110 km/h (70 mph)
- Lowest pressure: 976 hPa (mbar); 28.82 inHg

Category 1-equivalent tropical cyclone
- 1-minute sustained (SSHWS/JTWC)
- Highest winds: 120 km/h (75 mph)

Overall effects
- Fatalities: 388
- Damage: $129 million (1996 USD)
- Areas affected: Andhra Pradesh, Tamil Nadu, Gujarat
- Part of the 1996 North Indian Ocean cyclone season

The October 1996 India cyclone (also known as Cyclone 05A) had an unusual and protracted path that spanned much of the northern Indian Ocean. It originated in a weather disturbance that formed on 14 October in the southern Bay of Bengal, off India's east coast. Moving westward, it struck Andhra Pradesh on 17 October as a well-defined low-pressure area. It crossed southern India and reorganized in the Arabian Sea off the western coast of India. The system developed into a depression on 22 October and quickly intensified while moving northward. By 24 October, the cyclone approached hurricane intensity as it developed an eye, reaching peak winds of at least 110 km/h (70 mph). On 25 October, the storm abruptly stalled and weakened off Gujarat, and progressed southwestward as a minimal storm. It was no longer classifiable as a tropical cyclone by 28 October, although its remnants persisted until 2 November when they dissipated east of Somalia.

In southern India, the storm dropped heavy rainfall that caused severe flooding in Andhra Pradesh. At least 112 reservoirs and dams were breached, killing 200 people in Prakasam district. The floodwaters ruined about 1,600,000 ha (4,000,000 acres) of crops and damaged around 53,000 houses, leaving thousands homeless. The floods killed 388 people in southern India and caused US$388 million in damage. The storm later brushed the west coast of India, stranding 50 boats. The Indian military helped with relief and rescue efforts. Another cyclone struck Andhra Pradesh in November, causing additional damage and deaths.

== Meteorological history ==
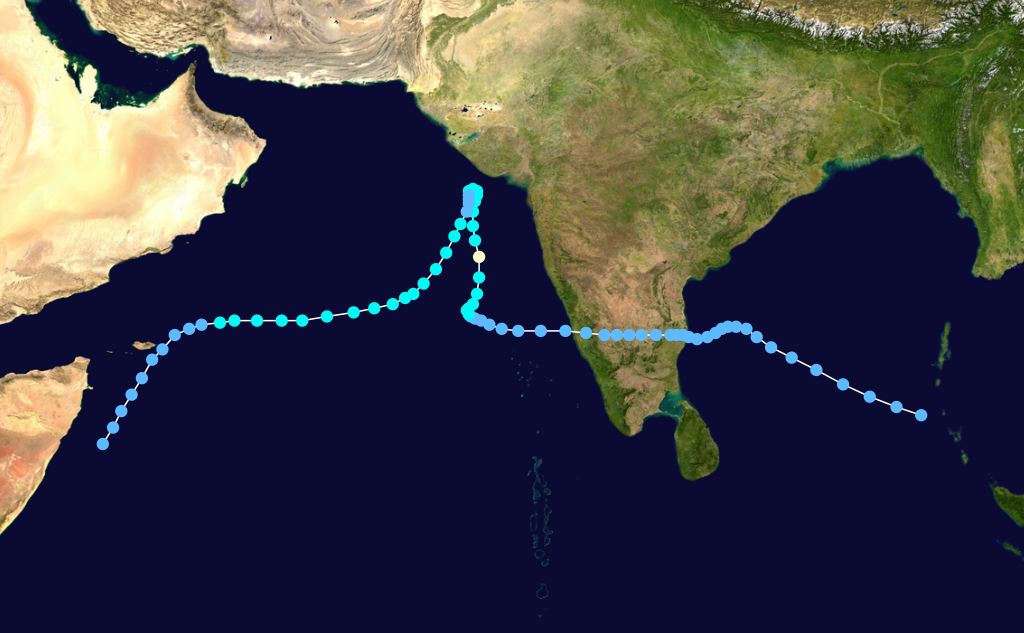
Map plotting the storm's track and intensity, according to the Saffir–Simpson scale Map key Saffir–Simpson scale Tropical depression (≤38 mph, ≤62 km/h) Tropical storm (39–73 mph, 63–118 km/h) Category 1 (74–95 mph, 119–153 km/h) Category 2 (96–110 mph, 154–177 km/h) Category 3 (111–129 mph, 178–208 km/h) Category 4 (130–156 mph, 209–251 km/h) Category 5 (≥157 mph, ≥252 km/h) Unknown Storm type Tropical cyclone Subtropical cyclone Extratropical cyclone, remnant low, tropical disturbance, or monsoon depression

The long-tracked storm originated from the monsoon trough, which spawned an area of convection, or thunderstorms, in the southern Bay of Bengal on 14 October. It moved to the west-northwest and later to the west without much development. The India Meteorological Department (IMD) classified the system as a well-marked low-pressure area before the system moved over the southern Indian state of Andhra Pradesh on 17 October. The system slowly crossed southern India, emerging into the Arabian Sea on 21 October. That day, the convection organized into a circular cluster as the circulation became more defined. The system slowed and turned to the north around the periphery of a ridge to the east. The system organized into a depression on 22 October, the same day that the Joint Typhoon Warning Center (JTWC) classified it as Tropical Cyclone 05A.

As the storm moved slowly northward, it quickly intensified, and the IMD upgraded the system's status from a depression on 22 October to severe cyclonic storm status late on October 23. Around that time, the storm developed an eye, and the JTWC estimated 1 minute peak winds of 120 km/h (75 mph) at 18:00 UTC that day, equivalent to a minimal hurricane. On 24 October, the IMD estimated peak 3 minute winds of 110 km/h (70 mph), although estimates derived from the Dvorak technique suggested winds of 120 km/h (75 mph).

On 25 October, the storm stalled about 95 km (59 mi) south of the Gujarat coast, as steering currents from the retreating ridge of high pressure diminished. Strengthening wind shear, cooler waters, and dry air rapidly weakened the storm. By late on 25 October, the JTWC had discontinued warnings, and the IMD downgraded the storm to depression status. The system began moving to the southwest away from the wind shear. The IMD downgraded the system further to a remnant low on 28 October, although the JTWC began issuing advisories again after a nearby ship reported winds of 65 km/h (40 mph). Accelerating to the west, the storm again weakened on 31 October, prompting the JTWC to discontinue advisories while the system was about 110 km (68 mi) northeast of Socotra. The remnants turned to the southwest, dissipating near the east coast of Somalia on 2 November.

The JTWC remarked that the storm "had one of the most unusual tracks in North Indian Ocean cyclone history" and was also one of the longest tracked cyclones in the basin. According to the IMD, most storms approaching Gujarat strike the coast or weaken and move westward. The agency stated that "there is no parallel of this system in [tropical cyclone history]."

== Impact and aftermath ==
The precursor to the storm brought heavy rainfall to southern India, mainly in Andhra Pradesh, as well as in Tamil Nadu to the south, Karnataka to the west, and Kerala to the southwest. Daily totals reached 230 mm (9.1 in) in portions of Andhra Pradesh, where damage was heaviest. The rains flooded rivers and cities, with thousands of residents in Hyderabad stranded in their houses. About 40 villages were isolated in Kadapa district. Throughout the region, the storm damaged 53,000 houses. About 86,000 people sought shelter after the storm, and thousands were left homeless. Highways and railroads were inundated, with many bridges washed away. At least 112 reservoirs and dams were breached. The floods also damaged about 1,600,000 hectares (4,000,000 acres) of crop fields – 450,000 hectares (1,100,000 acres) of rice and 1,150,000 hectares (2,800,000 acres) of ground nuts – and killed about 45,000 head of cattle. At least 200 people were killed in the Prakasam district after reservoirs were damaged. In Tamil Nadu, south of Andhra Pradesh, at least 10 people were killed, all in Chennai. Overall, 388 people died in southern India due to the floods, including at least 326 in Andhra Pradesh. Damage was estimated at US$128.5 million, of which US$120 million was in Andhra Pradesh.

After the floods, helicopters airlifted relief supplies like food and water to isolated villages, and to residents riding out the floods on their roofs. However, relief coordination was disrupted by damaged communication lines and ongoing rainfall. Rescue boats were used to rescue stranded residents. India's Prime Minister H. D. Deve Gowda provided 500 million rupees (US$15 million) to help Andhra Pradesh with flood recovery. Conditions returned to normal within 12 days of the onslaught of the rains, with the exception of minor delays to trains. However, another cyclone struck Andhra Pradesh about three weeks after the flood event, killing over 1,000 people.

Upon forming and moving parallel to India's west coastline, the storm dropped rainfall in the Konkan region of Maharashtra and neighboring Goa. The threat of the storm prompted schools to be closed around Mumbai. Later, it brushed Gujarat with heavy rainfall and gusty winds. About 50 boats were stranded amid high seas, and 11 other boats were left missing from the Veraval port. During the height of the storm, 320 fishermen were unaccounted for, spurring the Indian navy to launch search and rescue missions.

== See also ==
- Cyclone Yemyin – another storm that originated in the Bay of Bengal and crossed India to develop further over the Arabian Sea
