= Cyclone Bonita =

South-West Indian tropical cyclone 1996

Intense Tropical Cyclone Bonita
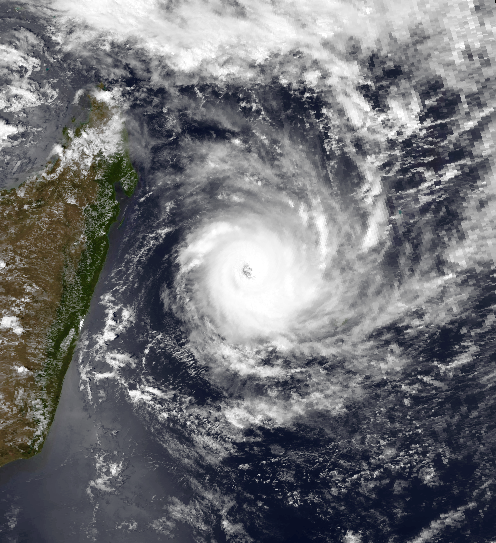
- Satellite image of Cyclone Bonita approaching Madagascar

Meteorological history
- Formed: 3 January 1996
- Remnant low: 15 January 1996
- Dissipated: 20 January 1996

Intense tropical cyclone
- 10-minute sustained (MFR)
- Highest winds: 185 km/h (115 mph)
- Lowest pressure: 920 hPa (mbar); 27.17 inHg

Category 4-equivalent tropical cyclone
- 1-minute sustained (SSHWS/JTWC)
- Highest winds: 250 km/h (155 mph)

Overall effects
- Fatalities: ~42
- Areas affected: Madagascar, Mozambique, Zimbabwe, Zambia, Angola
- IBTrACS
- Part of the 1995–96 South-West Indian Ocean cyclone season

Intense Tropical Cyclone Bonita in January 1996 struck both Madagascar and Mozambique, causing severe damage. The long-lived storm began developing in the last hours of 1995, and slowly consolidated over the open waters of the South-West Indian Ocean. Tracking generally toward the west-southwest, the disturbance received its name from Météo-France on 5 January. Ultimately peaking as an intense tropical cyclone, Bonita bypassed Mauritius and Réunion to the north before striking northeastern Madagascar late on 10 January. There, the storm affected up to 150,000 people, flooded wide tracts of croplands, and killed 25 people. In the aftermath, disaster relief came from both the government of Madagascar and the international community, as well as non-governmental organizations (NGOs); the United Nations Department of Humanitarian Affairs assisted in the distribution of about $450,000 in monetary donations.

Bonita emerged into the Mozambique Channel as a significantly diminished storm, though it quickly regained some of its previous intensity. Three days after its initial landfall, the cyclone moved ashore over the Zambezia Province of Mozambique. Throughout northern parts of the country, Bonita triggered extensive flooding that damaged or destroyed hundreds of buildings and reportedly killed 17 individuals. Swollen rivers submerged roads and bridges, isolating some locations. A meteorological rarity, Bonita continued inland for several days, persisting as a distinct tropical low; the system traversed southern Africa and ultimately entered the South Atlantic Ocean. In the process, it dropped unseasonably heavy rainfall over Zimbabwe and Zambia. A paper published by the Zambia Meteorological Department asserted that Bonita was the first storm confirmed to have tracked across the African continent from the South-West Indian Ocean to the Southern Atlantic Ocean.

== Meteorological history ==
Map plotting the storm's track and intensity, according to the Saffir–Simpson scale Map key Saffir–Simpson scale Tropical depression (≤38 mph, ≤62 km/h) Tropical storm (39–73 mph, 63–118 km/h) Category 1 (74–95 mph, 119–153 km/h) Category 2 (96–110 mph, 154–177 km/h) Category 3 (111–129 mph, 178–208 km/h) Category 4 (130–156 mph, 209–251 km/h) Category 5 (≥157 mph, ≥252 km/h) Unknown Storm type Tropical cyclone Subtropical cyclone Extratropical cyclone, remnant low, tropical disturbance, or monsoon depression

Cyclone Bonita originated from a weak area of disturbed weather observed about 600 km (370 mi) to the east of Diego Garcia, in the Chagos Archipelago, on 31 December 1995. The system was marked by a distinct low-level circulation and curved banding features, and the Joint Typhoon Warning Center (JTWC) promptly began monitoring it. A hostile upper-air pattern prevented further organization over the following several days as the disturbance drifted generally toward the southwest. On 3 January, the low pressure center showed initial signs of strengthening, prompting Météo-France to declare it a tropical disturbance, the lowest of seven distinct intensity categories used by the agency. The surrounding environment became more favorable for tropical cyclogenesis, with increased upper-level divergence, and consequently, the system further matured; it was upgraded to a depression early on 5 January, and to a moderate tropical storm 12 hours later. At that time, it was named Bonita by Météo-France Réunion (MFR). The JTWC upgraded 06S (its internal designation for Bonita) to a tropical storm equivalent early the next day.

Continuing to intensify, the storm accelerated toward the west-southwest, heading nearly due west for a short time as it encountered a subtropical ridge of high pressure. The cyclone's inner structure steadily improved in organization, adhering well to the model of a well-developed tropical system. Transcending the severe tropical cyclone stage, Bonita achieved tropical cyclone status at 1200 UTC on 8 January. Passing just south of St. Brandon, the system exhibited a broad and ill-defined eye about 50 km (31 mi) across. The cyclone quickly strengthened over the course of the same day, with a consolidating eye and a formidable central dense overcast. Tracking about 225 km (140 mi) north of Mauritius, Bonita reached its peak intensity—as assessed by Météo-France—with maximum sustained winds of 185 km/h (115 mph) and a central barometric air pressure of 920 hPa (27 inHg). This made the storm as an intense tropical cyclone, the second-highest category on the regional scale. The JTWC stated that Bonita (06S) peaked at 12:00 UTC the next day, with 1-minute peak winds of 250 km/h (160 mph) (a Category 4 tropical cyclone on the Saffir–Simpson Hurricane Scale).

According to Météo-France, Bonita began to weaken slightly in the early hours of 9 January, the eye becoming asymmetric and poorly defined. The ridge to the south prevented the storm from progressing to the south, and after passing about 270 km (170 mi) north of Réunion, Bonita shifted due west and later roughly west-by-north, apparently steered by a building mid-to-upper-level anticyclone south of Madagascar. It remained a strong tropical cyclone as it approached the eastern coast of Madagascar, making landfall near Mahavelona on the night of 10 January local time, or about 21:30 UTC. At the time of landfall, a clear eye was visible on satellite imagery. It crossed the island nation over the course of about a day, weakening significantly to a moderate tropical storm as it reemerged into the Mozambique Channel. Once over water, favorable conditions prompted quick reintensification of the cyclone, as it proceeded west-southwestward toward mainland Africa. At 12:00 UTC on 13 January, Bonita reattained severe tropical storm status, marking its secondary peak intensity with 10-minute winds of 95 km/h (59 mph). With an expansive circulation and a good structure, the cyclone made its second and final landfall over the Zambezia Province of Mozambique, between Quelimane and Pebane District, on the night of 13 January local time. Bonita meandered inland, weakening only gradually and nearly tracking back over open water.

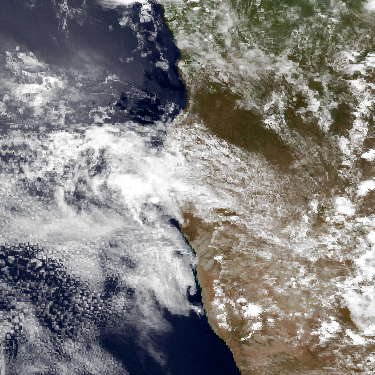
The remnants of Bonita at midday on 19 January 1996, off the coast of Angola

Although the cyclone's "best track" listings by both Météo-France and the JTWC end at 0600 UTC on 15 January, its residual tropical low remained distinct and active as it continued generally westward across the southern African continent. Where nearly all landfalling tropical cyclones in the area recurve toward the south or dissipate quickly on moving ashore, a rare synoptic pattern allowed the remnants of Bonita to persist, moving over northern Zimbabwe on 16 January. For the next two days, the weakening storm remained prominent on satellite imagery, ultimately moving off the coast of Angola and entering the South Atlantic Ocean on 19 January. By the next day, the system had succumbed to cold waters and days of land interaction, dissipating completely. According to a paper published by the Zambia Meteorological Department, Bonita was the first tropical cyclone known to have traversed southern Africa from the South-West Indian Ocean to the South Atlantic.

== Impact and aftermath ==
=== Madagascar ===
A recording station at Toamasina recorded 170 mm (6.7 in) of rain in 24 hours, accompanied by sustained winds of 150 km/h (93 mph). Stronger winds were observed on the offshore island of Île Sainte-Marie, where gusts exceeded 230 km/h (140 mph) on 10 January. Extensive freshwater flooding penetrated far inland, inundating 1,800 ha (4,400 acres) of rice crops in one area alone near Antananarivo. Damage was heaviest along the northeastern coastline of Madagascar, particularly around Mahavelona, Fenoarivo Atsinanana, and Mahambo. where both infrastructure and crops took a heavy beating. In its seasonal tropical cyclone report, Météo-France confirmed that 25 people in the country were either killed, or unaccounted for and presumed dead. Overall, the storm impacted as many as 150,000 individuals, of whom 5,000 were left homeless. However, coverage of the disaster was scarce.

Following the storm, a government-endorsed disaster relief program was initiated to mitigate the developing humanitarian crisis in the three hardest-hit communes. The program was to distribute emergency food rations to 40,000 affected individuals, with special supplies intended to reach 1,500 malnourished children. A malnutrition rehabilitation center was established in Mahavelona as part of the program, which cost approximately $1.2 million (1996 USD) in total, and funded partially by the United Nations Department of Humanitarian Affairs (DHA). At the end of February, the Government of Madagascar requested international aid; by 6 March, France and Germany had donated a combined $100,000 in assistance funds, as well as emergency supplies worth nearly $80,000. Overall, the DHA handled roughly $450,000 in foreign donations, mostly from Europe. United States Ambassador to Madagascar, Vicki J. Huddleston, authorized the allocation of $25,000 to distribute tarps, while the United States Agency for International Development sent $17,000 for medical treatment.

Immediately following the cyclone's onslaught, concerns arose amongst relief agencies and NGOs that the storm was either too early in the season or not damaging enough to dedicate a significant portion of disaster funds. Consequently, disagreements between prospective donors about the extent of emergency response resulted in delayed intervention. Post-storm assessments of the response to Bonita highlighted the need for increased coordination between agencies.

=== Africa ===
Bonita also proved destructive in northern Mozambique, notably in the provinces of Zambezia, Nampula, and Cabo Delgado. The storm extensively damaged about 400 houses in the city of Quelimane, which was left with severely impaired electric facilities. Subsequently, international entities distributed emergency food supplies to storm victims. Substantial rainfall caused damaging floods throughout inland portions of country, reportedly killing as many as 17 people. Floodwaters destroyed 2,500 ha (6,200 acres) of crops and demolished many buildings, including about 12 schools. The Buzi River swelled beyond its banks, sweeping away nearby houses and rendering roadways impassable in the Buzi District. Local officials were unable to reach the hardest-hit places, prompting fears of heavier destruction than what had been reported. Significant flooding was also reported in the Pungwe River watershed; bridges over two of its tributaries were submerged.

The remnants of Bonita dropped significant precipitation, described as the heaviest in 80 years, over drought-stricken eastern Zimbabwe. A long-standing two-day rainfall total was broken at Rusape, which recorded 135 mm (5.3 in) of precipitation between 15 and 16 January. Unsettled weather extended into Zambia, which endured relatively strong winds and noteworthy precipitation that contributed to above-normal seasonal rainfall totals in many areas; by comparison, rainfall remained average or even trended slightly below-average across northern and eastern sections of the nation. Daily rainfall totals in Zambia peaked at 134 mm (5.3 in) at Choma on 16 January.

== See also ==
- Tropical cyclones in 1996
- Cyclone Geralda (1994) – impacted Madagascar with greater destruction than Bonita, about two years earlier; used as a benchmark by disaster relief parties in its aftermath of Bonita.
- Cyclone Nadia (1994) – struck the northern coast of Mozambique two years before Bonita.
- Tropical Storm Chalane (2020) - traversed Southern Africa after striking Madagascar and Mozambique
- Cyclone Freddy (2023) – another tropical cyclone which also affected Madagascar and Mozambique, and made landfall near Quelimane 27 years later.
