= 1996 Andhra Pradesh cyclone =

Category 4 North Indian tropical cyclone in 1996

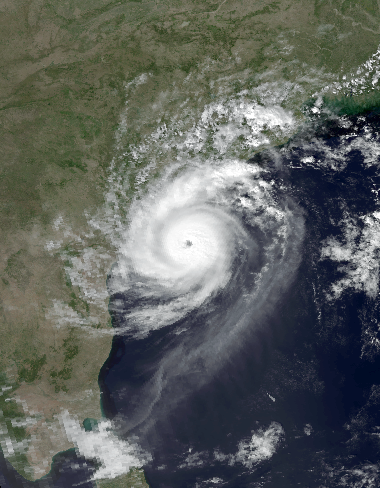
- Satellite image of the storm prior to landfall in India on 6 November

Meteorological history
- Formed: 4 November 1996
- Dissipated: 7 November 1996

Very severe cyclonic storm
- 3-minute sustained (IMD)
- Highest winds: 145 km/h (90 mph)
- Lowest pressure: 988 hPa (mbar); 29.18 inHg

Category 4-equivalent tropical cyclone
- 1-minute sustained (SSHWS/JTWC)
- Highest winds: 215 km/h (130 mph)
- Lowest pressure: 927 hPa (mbar); 27.37 inHg

Overall effects
- Fatalities: 1,077 total
- Damage: $602 million (1996 USD)
- Areas affected: India (especially Andhra Pradesh)
- Part of the 1996 North Indian Ocean cyclone season

The 1996 Andhra Pradesh cyclone (also known as Cyclone 07B) was a small but powerful storm that left heavy damage in the Indian state of Andhra Pradesh. It formed on 4 November in the eastern Bay of Bengal. Moving westward, it quickly organized and developed a well-defined eye. On 6 November, the cyclone struck about 50 km (31 mi) south of Kakinada, Andhra Pradesh at peak intensity. The India Meteorological Department estimated peak winds of 145 km/h (90 mph), (Note: The India Meteorological Department is the official Regional Specialized Meteorological Center for the northern Indian Ocean.) while the American-based Joint Typhoon Warning Center (JTWC) assessed peak winds of 215 km/h (135 mph). (Note: The Joint Typhoon Warning Center is a joint United States Navy – United States Air Force task force that issues tropical cyclone warnings for the northern Indian Ocean and other regions.) Soon after landfall, the cyclone weakened and dissipated by 7 November.

Ahead of the storm, about 225,000 families evacuated, although many towns lacked proper storm shelters. When the cyclone made landfall, it produced strong winds up to 100 km (62 mi) inland, dropped 210 mm (8.3 in) of rainfall across a 40 km (25 mi) region, and flooded over 250 villages along a 60 km (37 mi) portion of the coast. About 70% of the overall damage was in East Godavari district, where two villages were entirely destroyed. The storm destroyed 241,802 ha (597,510 acres) of crops and killed millions of cattle and chicken. Across Andhra Pradesh, the storm damaged 647,554 houses, including over 10,000 that were destroyed. Overall damage totaled ₹21.5 billion (equivalent to ₹120 billion or US$1.2 billion in 2023), comparable to a cyclone in 1977 that also hit Andhra Pradesh. There were 1,077 confirmed deaths with many others missing, although many of the dead were washed into the sea and were unlikely to be found. After the storm, the government and local Red Cross chapters helped residents recover from the damage, while the World Bank provided money to better prepare Andhra Pradesh for future storms.

== Meteorological history ==
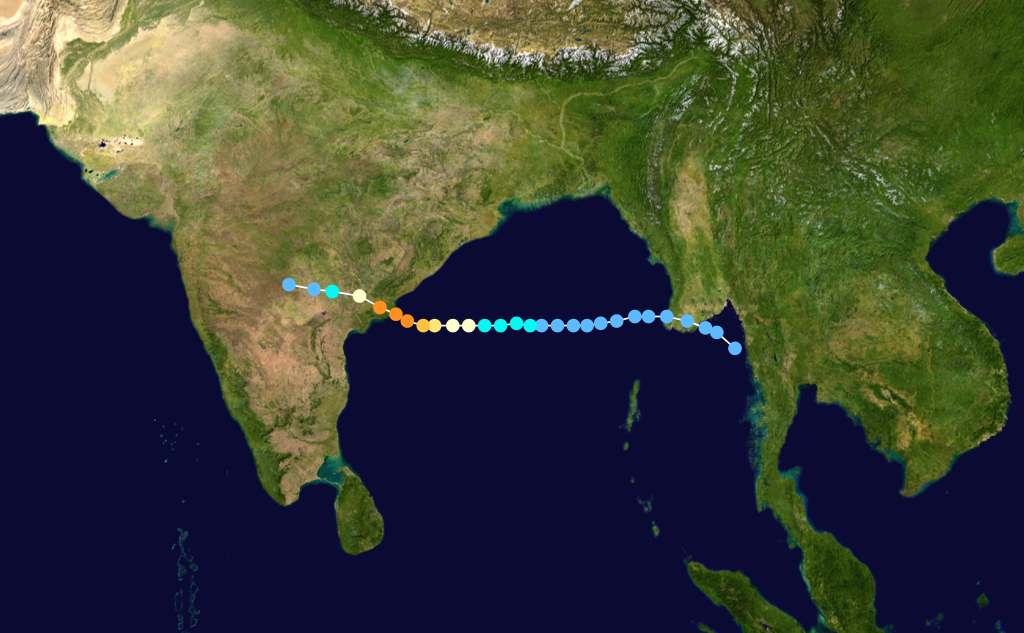
Map plotting the storm's track and intensity, according to the Saffir–Simpson scale Map key Saffir–Simpson scale Tropical depression (≤38 mph, ≤62 km/h) Tropical storm (39–73 mph, 63–118 km/h) Category 1 (74–95 mph, 119–153 km/h) Category 2 (96–110 mph, 154–177 km/h) Category 3 (111–129 mph, 178–208 km/h) Category 4 (130–156 mph, 209–251 km/h) Category 5 (≥157 mph, ≥252 km/h) Unknown Storm type Tropical cyclone Subtropical cyclone Extratropical cyclone, remnant low, tropical disturbance, or monsoon depression

On 30 October, a Pacific tropical depression crossed the Kra Isthmus into the Bay of Bengal, dissipating the next day over Myanmar. A new area of convection, or thunderstorms, developed over the Andaman Sea on 1 November The system was located within the monsoon trough, and a weak flow steered it slowly westward across the Bay of Bengal, bringing it briefly over southwestern Myanmar. After the convection organized more, the Joint Typhoon Warning Center (JTWC) issued a Tropical Cyclone Formation Alert at 07:30 UTC on 3 November. At 12:00 UTC that day, the agency initiated advisories on the system, designating it Tropical Cyclone 07B about 645 km (401 mi) west of Yangon, Myanmar. The India Meteorological Department (IMD) – the official Regional Specialized Meteorological Center for the basin – did not classify the system until 4 November; at 15:00 UTC, the agency designated it as a depression.

Located beneath the axis of an upper-level ridge, the depression was able to intensify and organize more, with prominent outflow developing. On 5 November, the IMD upgraded the system to a deep depression and later to a cyclonic storm. At 06:00 UTC on the same day, the JTWC upgraded the storm to the equivalent of a minimal hurricane, estimating 1 minute winds of 120 km/h (75 mph). It continued westward toward eastern India at a slow pace, later turning more to the west-northwest. Early on 6 November, the storm began rapidly intensifying, and the IMD upgraded the storm to a severe cyclonic storm and later a very severe cyclonic storm. At 04:00 UTC that day, an irregular eye formed in the middle of the central dense overcast, which quickly became more circular and distinct. At 06:00 UTC on 6 November, the JTWC estimated peak 1 minute winds of 215 km/h (135 mph), the equivalent of a Category 4 on the Saffir–Simpson scale, and a minimum barometric pressure of 927 mbar (27.4 inHg). The IMD assessed a much lower intensity, estimating 3 minute winds of 145 km/h (90 mph) based on a Dvorak rating of 4.5.

While approaching land, the eye contracted from a peak width of 64 to 17 km (40 to 11 mi). At 16:00 UTC on 6 November, the cyclone made landfall about 50 km (31 mi) south of Kakinada, Andhra Pradesh along the east coast of India. The estimated landfall pressure was 978 mbar (28.9 inHg). It was a smaller-than-normal cyclone, only 450 km (280 mi) in diameter. The storm rapidly weakened after moving ashore, deteriorating into a deep depression early on 7 November. The JTWC issued their last advisory at 06:00 UTC that day, and the IMD downgraded the system to a remnant low-pressure area over Telangana at 12:00 UTC.

== Preparations and impact ==
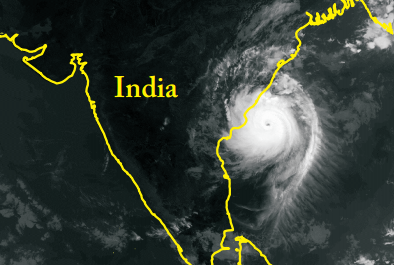
Satellite image and map of the cyclone approaching India

The IMD issued warnings related to the cyclone that were distributed to the public by television, telegraph, news outlets, and other government departments. The All India Radio broadcast warnings beginning on 5 November, the day before landfall. Train service was disrupted throughout Andhra Pradesh, stranding thousands of travelers. India's Oil and Natural Gas Corporation suspended operations during the storm. The storm caused local Diwali festivities to be canceled. It ultimately struck about 50 km (31 mi) north of where it was expected, in a region farther away from state shelters. About 225,000 families evacuated due to the storm. However, about 30% of the towns in the region lacked a storm shelter, and the existing shelters were generally in poor shape. Some residents avoided the shelters due to their state of disrepair, or stayed in their homes for fear they would be robbed. In addition, storm emergency plans enacted after a cyclone in 1977 that struck Andhra Pradesh had not been used since 1986. Roads and shelters built following a cyclone in 1990 fared the storm better than older structures.

The powerful cyclone brought intense winds, heavy rainfall, and high waves to Andhra Pradesh in eastern India. Hurricane-force winds – at least 120 km/h (75 mi) – penetrated 100 km (62 mi) inland. Peak gusts were estimated at 200 km/h (125 mph), based on anemometers that were blown away in Yanam. The highest recorded sustained wind was 111 km/h (69 mph) by a ship at the Kakinada Port, only 50 km (31 mi) from the landfall location. The storm dropped heavy rainfall near the coast, peaking at 390 mm (15 in) in Amalapuram. Rainfall rates of over 210 mm (8.3 in) occurred over 3 hours in a 40 km (25 mi) stretch of land. Along a 60 km (37 mi) portion of the coast, 3.7 m (12 ft) waves accompanied a 2 m (6.6 ft) storm surge, spreading 5 km (3.1 mi) inland. The storm struck just three weeks after another storm killed 350 people. Storm damage extended 130 km (81 mi) inland. Widespread areas of crop fields were inundated with floodwaters, washing away tons of rice, coconuts, and bananas. The winds knocked down about 5 million coconut trees. It was estimated that the storm destroyed 174,000 ha (430,000 acres) of rice paddy, along with 67,802 ha (167,540 acres) of other crops. About 13,500 livestock and 1 million chickens were killed by the storm; many of them rotted on arable fields after the waters receded.

Heavy rainfall and high tides flooded more than 250 villages, and the cyclone affected 1,380 villages throughout Andhra Pradesh. Many canals and drains were breached by the floods. The storm washed four cargo ships ashore and sank or destroyed 6,464 boats. About 70% of the overall damage was in East Godavari district, where Kakinada was among the hardest hit villages. Two nearby villages – Bhairvapada and Bulusutippa – were entirely destroyed. The villages did not receive advanced warning, and Bhairvapada did not have a functioning cyclone shelter. There, 90% of the boats were damaged or destroyed. In Amalapuram, also in East Godavari, roughly two of every three houses were destroyed. The cyclone also destroyed 55 electrical towers, including a 100 m (330 ft) tall telecommunications tower, as well as nearly 17,000 power lines in West Godavari. About 1,300 km (810 mi) of roads were damaged or washed out, including 210 km (130 mi) of National Highway 5. Flooding also washed out several railroads, while damaged water drainage systems spewed sewage onto the streets. Many hospitals in the region were washed away or flooded. Across Andhra Pradesh, the storm damaged 647,554 houses, with about 200,000 sustaining roof damage, and over 10,000 that were destroyed. Over 100,000 people were left homeless. In the hardest hit areas, only houses made of brick and cement withstood the high winds, and huts made of mud and thatch were decimated. Overall damage was officially estimated at RS$21.5 billion (US$602 million). (Note: The total was originally reported in Indian rupee. Total converted via the Oanda Corporation website.) However, the World Bank indicated damage reached as high as US$1.5 billion. Officials likened damage to the 1977 cyclone that also struck Andhra Pradesh.

After the storm, there were 1,000 fishermen missing at sea, despite warnings not to leave port. After being presumed lost, 162 boats returned to port four days after the storm, and additional fishermen returned over the succeeding days. However, there were 569 fishermen killed or left missing due to lost boats at sea. Many of these fishermen had departed days before the storm, and those that survived had transistors in their boats. Lacking advanced warning, many shrimp farmers in remote villages were swept away by waves. Hundreds of dead bodies were discovered along the shore; after they were identified, the corpses were cremated instead of bringing the bodies into local villages. Most of the fatalities on land were the result of buildings collapsing on people who stayed inside. A ferry crossing the Godavari River sank amid rough waves, killing all 42 people on board. Overall, the cyclone killed at least 978 people in Andhra Pradesh, with 1,375 people listed as missing in January 1997. However, the Red Cross did not expect to find all of the missing bodies, as some were likely washed into the Bay of Bengal. A later report to the Food and Agriculture Organization indicated there were 1,077 confirmed deaths, with an unconfirmed death toll as high as 2,760.

== Aftermath ==
Following the storm's heavy damage, homeless residents resided in temporary camps. Later, the Indian government set up 742 relief centers housing 177,000 people, utilizing schools and office buildings. However, residents did not stay for extended periods of time in the shelters, as rebuilding began within three days of the storm's landfall. Many of the displaced people returned to their homes after the storm receded. Workers restored water service and distributed potable water to those in need. Workers used cranes to remove trees from highways. Roads and communication links were quickly restored, as was the power supply. Later, damaged houses were reconstructed with tiled roofs while destroyed houses were rebuilt on concrete slabs, both to withstand stronger winds.

The Andhra Pradesh government coordinated with the Indian Red Cross Society to provide relief goods to the affected citizens, such as 75 kg (165 lb) of rice per family. The Red Cross sent 10 trucks carrying blankets, food, and cooking supplies from Delhi to Andhra Pradesh, to be distributed by the Andhra Pradesh Red Cross. India's military enacted search and rescue missions in the days following the storm. Six helicopters worked continuously to airlift food, water, and medicine to storm victims, although residents fought over the aid in poor areas. Helicopters also surveyed the storm damage, as many affected small villages were not linked by roads. About 935 medical teams were established following the storm, and chlorinated drinking tablets were distributed to purify water, in an attempt to prevent a cholera outbreak. Cholera spreads through stagnant contaminated water, and there were eight reports of storm victims contracting the disease. In the months after the storm, foreign governments and international organizations donated about US$500,000.

The World Bank considered the cyclone as having a significant effect on Andhra Pradesh's economy. Andhra Pradesh's chief minister N. Chandrababu Naidu estimated that the state would take as long as 30 years to recover from the storm. The government provided Rs. 1,500 (US$420) to every family whose hut collapsed during the storm, and Rs. 100,000 (US$2,857) to the family of every person killed by the storm. However, there were also reports of people stealing bodies to receive the payment. The federal government provided about US$12 million to the state, as well as tax deductions for monetary donations. Former Union Minister Rangaiah Naidu opined that the state government overinflated the damage estimates to qualify for additional aid, in part due to the government spending annual disaster subsidies for salaries. The World Bank credited the government's experience with disasters as saving lives, although the response to the disaster was largely in repairing damage, rather than mitigating against future storms. The storm also demonstrated the region's outdated infrastructure.

Following the heavy damage from the cyclone and other recent disasters, the World Bank enacted a plan for Andhra Pradesh in April 1997, consisting of repairing damaged infrastructure, an updated disaster plan, and technical assistance to the state government. Shelters and roads would be improved to higher standards. This plan ultimately cost about US$175 million and was completed in July 2003, three years longer than expected but at a lower cost due to the Indian rupee losing some of its value. Power lines were improved to withstand winds of 200 km/h (120 mph), while drains were enlarged and a coastal plant system was created to lessen flooding. An additional 82 public shelters were constructed. However, the plan failed to yield a long term disaster policy for the state.

== See also ==
- Typhoon Gay (1989) – powerful cyclone that took a similar track from the South China Sea into India
- Cyclone Jal – weaker storm that also crossed the entirety of the Bay of Bengal
