= List of storms named Jenna =

The name Jenna has been used for two tropical cyclones in the Australian region of the Southern Hemisphere:

- Cyclone Jenna (1996) - a Category 2 tropical cyclone that stayed out to sea
- Cyclone Jenna (2026) - a Category 4 tropical cyclone that also stayed out to sea
