= 1995–96 South-West Indian Ocean cyclone season =

Cyclone season in the Southwest Indian Ocean

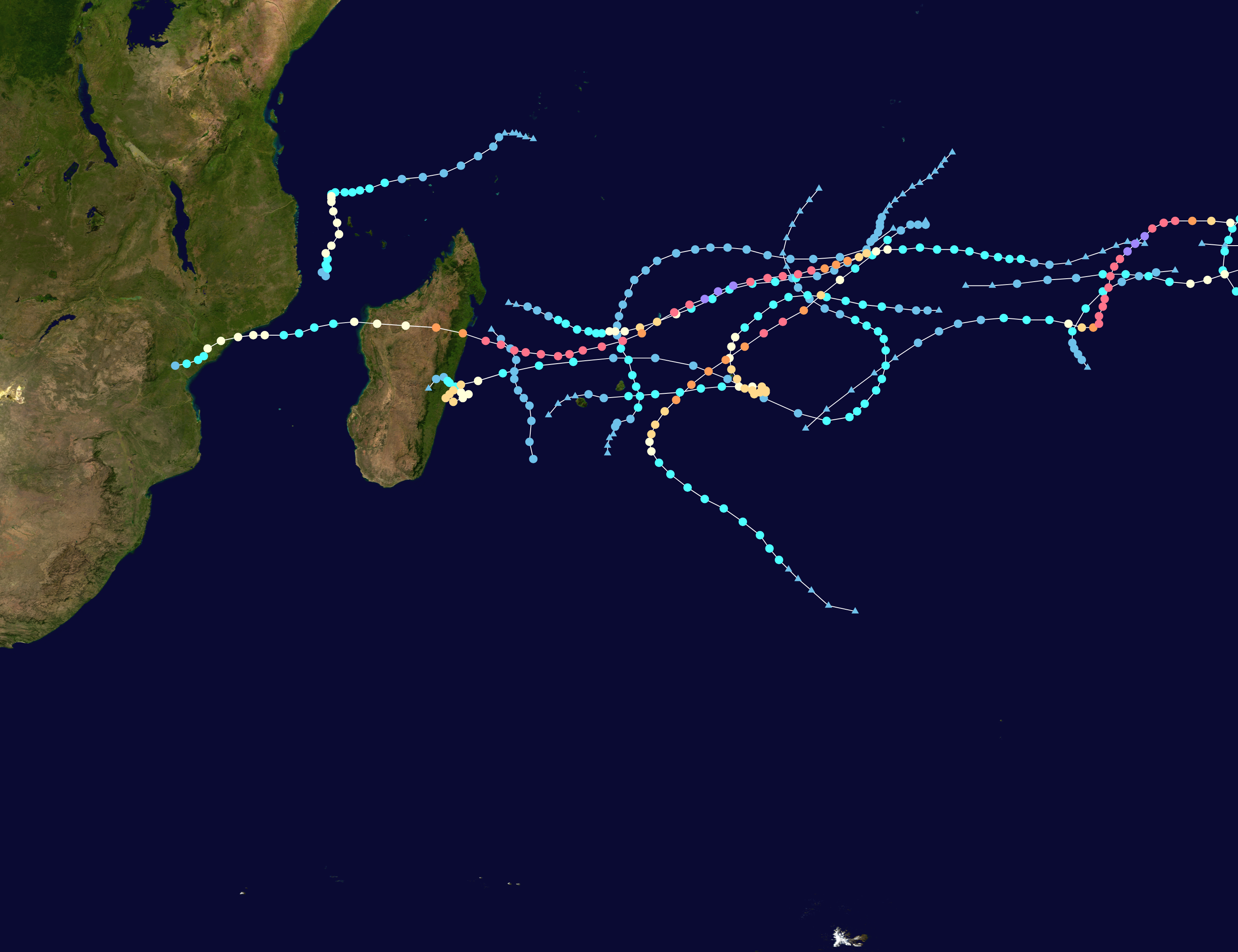
- Season summary map

Seasonal boundaries
- First system formed: November 19, 1995
- Last system dissipated: May 4, 1996

Strongest storm
- Name: Bonita
  - Maximum winds: 185 km/h (115 mph) (10-minute sustained)
  - Lowest pressure: 920 hPa (mbar)

Seasonal statistics
- Total depressions: 13
- Total storms: 11
- Tropical cyclones: 6
- Intense tropical cyclones: 3
- Total fatalities: 109
- Total damage: Unknown

Related articles
- 1995–96 Australian region cyclone season; 1995–96 South Pacific cyclone season

The 1995–96 South-West Indian Ocean cyclone season was a moderately active season that included Cyclone Bonita, which was the first known tropical cyclone to cross from the southern Indian Ocean into the southern Atlantic Ocean. Tropical activity lasted for about six months from the middle of November 1995 to early May 1996. The first storm, Intense Tropical Cyclone Agnielle, formed in the adjacent Australian basin on November 16 and later reached peak winds in the south-west Indian Ocean. The next named storm after Agnielle was Bonita, which formed in early January and killed 42 people. The basin was most active in February, with two tropical cyclones, or the equivalent of a minimal hurricane, as well as a severe tropical storm. The first of these three was Doloresse, which killed 67 people due to a shipwreck in the Comoros. The next storm was Cyclone Edwige, which caused heavy crop damage on Mauritius before looping along the east coast of Madagascar. In March, both Cyclone Flossy and Tropical Storm Guylianne passed near the Mascarene Islands, producing heavy rainfall and gusty winds.

Tropical activity continued through April and May, with two tropical cyclones in the former month. In early April, Tropical Cyclone Hansella moved over the island of Rodrigues, dropping more rainfall in 24 hours than the average monthly total. Later, Itelle became a rare April intense tropical cyclone, but weakened before it approached St. Brandon island. The final storm of the season, Jenna, formed in the Australian region, briefly intensified into a minimal tropical storm in the south-west Indian Ocean, and proceeded to exit the basin on May 4 to end the season. In addition to the named storms, several tropical depressions were tracked, one of which in December dropped heavy rainfall on Réunion.

== Seasonal summary ==
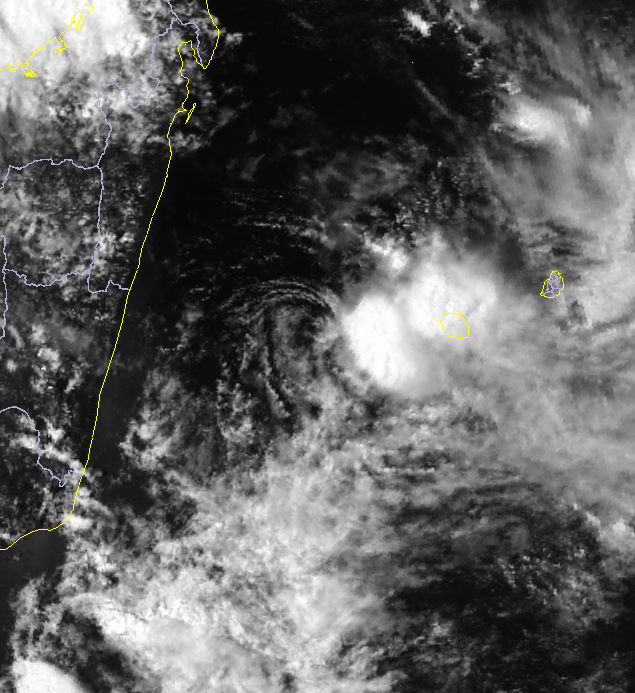
Satellite image of Tropical Depression B2

During the season, the Météo-France office (MFR) on Réunion island issued warnings in tropical cyclones within the basin. The agency estimated intensity through the Dvorak technique, and warned on tropical cyclones in the region from the coast of Africa to 90° E, south of the equator. The Joint Typhoon Warning Center (JTWC), which is a joint United States Navy – United States Air Force task force, also issued tropical cyclone warnings for the southwestern Indian Ocean.

The season was fairly active with ten tropical storms, one greater than average, although most storms were short-lived. Six of the storms reached tropical cyclone status, or maximum sustained winds of at least 120 km/h (75 mph), which is two more than average. Most cyclones dissipated within the tropics, in contrast to the norm of storms accelerating into higher latitudes. Throughout the season there were 82 days in which there was tropical activity. Based on a list contributed by the nation of Seychelles, the storms were named in sequential order, starting with Agnielle. The rest of the names on the list were Ketty, Lucia, Molly, Nadege, Odette, Paquerette, Rolina, Sylvianne, Talla, Vivienne, Walya, and Yoline.

In addition to the named storms, the MFR tracked 11 tropical depressions or disturbances that did not intensify into a tropical storm. The agency did not issue any bulletins on eight of them. Of the remaining three, two formed in late December, and the other formed in mid-February. Tropical Depression B2, the longest lasting of the depressions, formed after a month of activity. An area of convection developed in the Mozambique Channel, and the MFR believed it to be connected to the depression that formed on December 28 east of Madagascar. With a ridge to the east, the system tracked southward, but failed to intensify due to strong wind shear. While passing west of Réunion, the depression dropped heavy rainfall, totaling 350 mm (14 in) along the northern coast and about twice that amount in the mountainous interior. On December 31, the depression dissipated to the southwest of Réunion. On February 10, the JTWC tracked Tropical Cyclone 12S into the basin as a weakening tropical depression, which quickly dissipated. A few days later, the JTWC also tracked Tropical Cyclone 15S from February 14–17, which briefly intensified into a minimal tropical storm in the eastern portion of the basin.

== Systems ==
=== Intense Tropical Cyclone Daryl–Agnielle ===
- Intense tropical cyclone (MFR)
- Category 5 tropical cyclone (SSHWS)
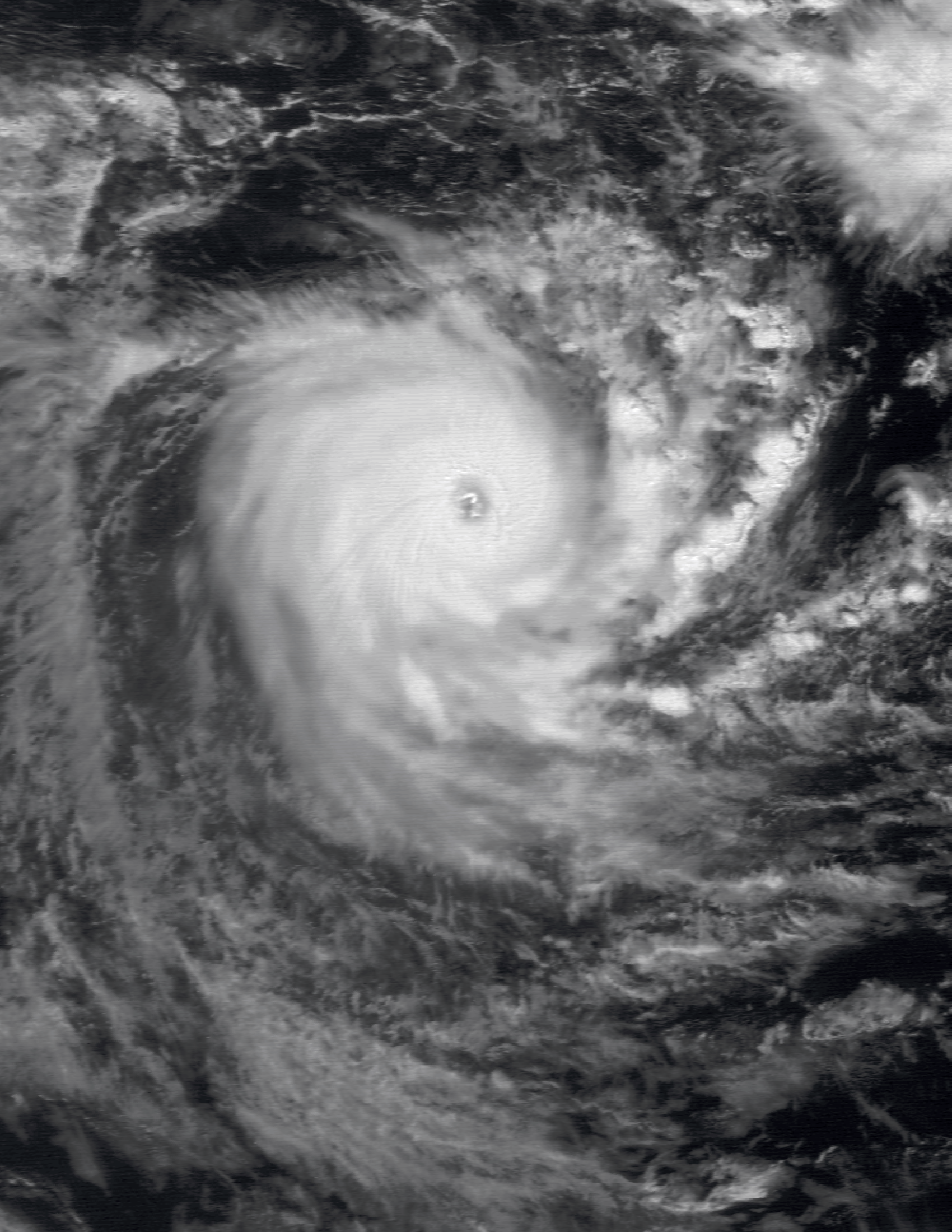
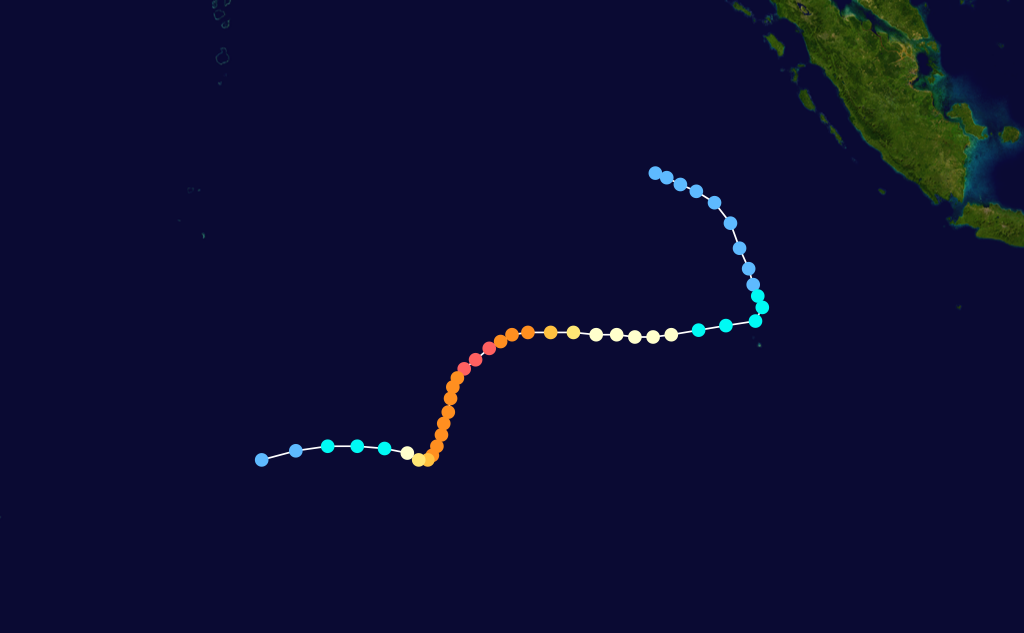
- Duration: November 19 (Entered basin) – November 27
- Peak intensity: 175 km/h (110 mph) (10-min); 925 hPa (mbar)

In the middle of November 1995, the Intertropical Convergence Zone (ITCZ) spawned an area of convection to the southwest of the Indonesian island of Sumatra. Located within the Australian region in an area of low wind shear, a tropical low developed west of Sumatra on November 16. It gradually intensified while moving southward, before turning sharply westward on November 18 due to a ridge to the south. That day, the Bureau of Meteorology (BoM) office in Perth upgraded the low to Tropical Cyclone Daryl, or to minimal tropical storm status. Designated Tropical Cyclone 01S by the JTWC, Daryl continued to intensify, and the BoM upgraded it to winds of 120 km/h (75 mph). The system crossed into the basin on November 19, and was renamed Daryl as Agnielle at that time.

On November 20, the ridge to the south weakened, allowing Agnielle to turn to the southwest. A well-defined eye developed, which persisted for about three days. Late on November 20, Agnielle attained peak 10‑minute sustained winds of 175 km/h (110 mph), making it an intense tropical cyclone, a rarity for November storms. On November 21, the JTWC estimated peak 1‑minute winds of 280 km/h (175 mph), the second-strongest storm estimated by the agency in the Indian Ocean, after only Cyclone Fantala. Although the eye briefly became less organized, accompanied by a decrease in winds, Agnielle re-intensified despite moving over colder waters. The ridge to the south rebuilt, forcing the cyclone to slow and turn to the west. Increasing wind shear caused rapid weakening; within 30 hours, the winds decreased from tropical cyclone to tropical depression status on November 25. That day, the JTWC discontinued advisories, although the MFR continued tracking the circulation until Agnielle's dissipation on November 27.

=== Intense Tropical Cyclone Bonita ===
- Intense tropical cyclone (MFR)
- Category 4 tropical cyclone (SSHWS)
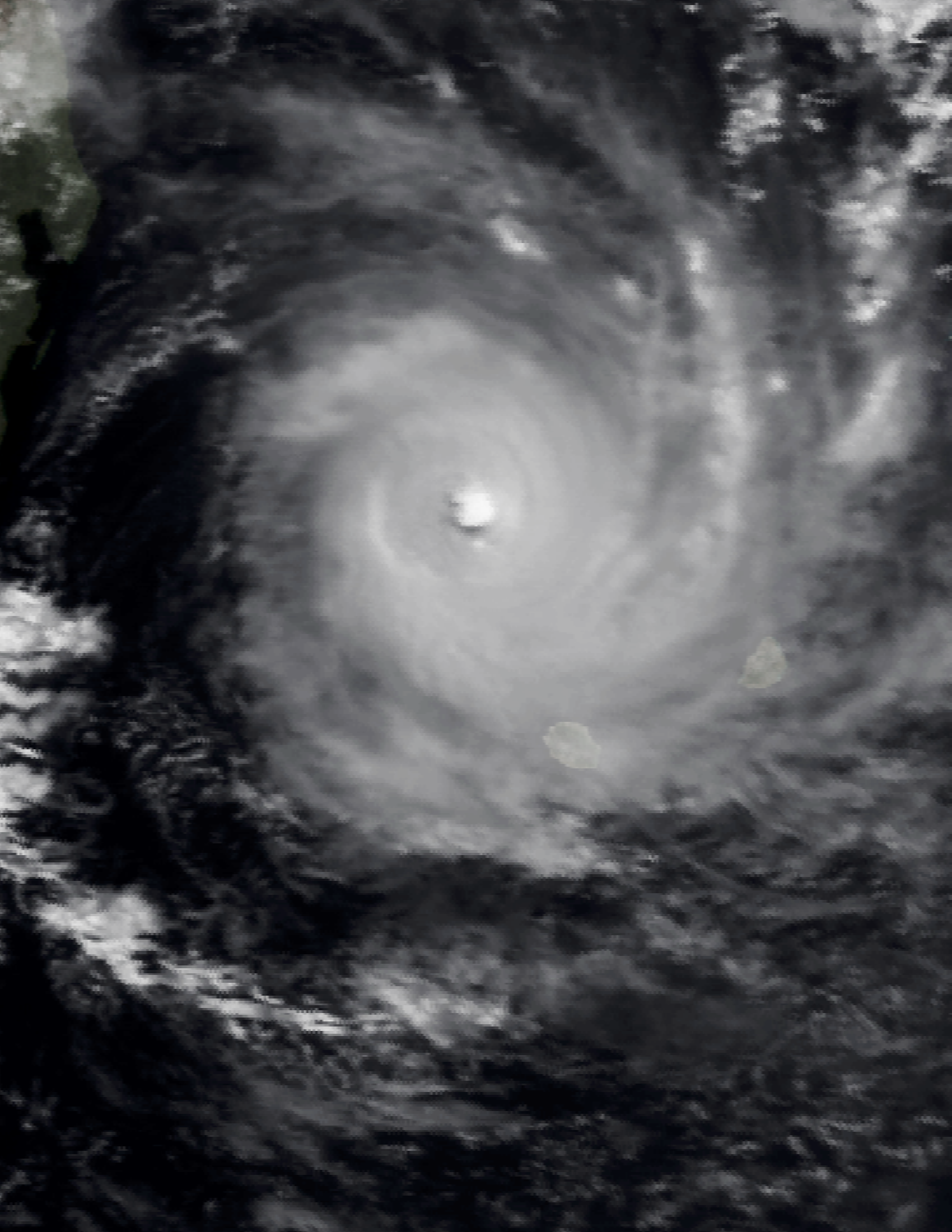
- Duration: January 3 – January 15
- Peak intensity: 185 km/h (115 mph) (10-min); 920 hPa (mbar)

As Tropical Depression B2 was dissipating near Réunion, another tropical depression formed east of the Chagos Archipelago on January 3. It moved southwestward, initially without development, but conditions gradually became more favorable. On January 5, the depression strengthened into Tropical Storm Bonita, and three days later reached tropical cyclone status as it developed a well-defined eye. Later that day, Bonita quickly intensified to its 10‑minute peak intensity of 185 km/h (115 mph), making it the strongest storm of the season. A ridge to the south turned the cyclone more to the west. On January 9, the JTWC estimated Bonita attained peak 1‑minute winds of 250 km/h (155 mph), and the next day, the cyclone made landfall about 50 km (31 mi) north of Foulpointe in eastern Madagascar. Bonita quickly weakened into a tropical storm while crossing the country but re-intensified slightly after reaching the Mozambique Channel on January 12. Late on January 13, Bonita made a second landfall in eastern Mozambique between Pebane and Quelimane. Although the MFR ceased issuing advisories on January 15, the remnants of Bonita continued across Africa, and emerging into the southern Atlantic Ocean on January 19 and dissipating the next day. Bonita was considered by the Zambia Meteorological Department to have been the first tropical cyclone known to have traversed southern Africa from the South-West Indian Ocean to the South Atlantic.

In eastern Madagascar, 24‑hour rainfall totals included 170 mm (6.7 in) at Toamasina, while gusts exceeded 230 km/h (145 mph) on the offshore island of Île Sainte-Marie. Bonita caused widespread flooding of rice crops, as well as heavy infrastructure and crop damage along the northeastern coastline. The cyclone killed 25 people in Madagascar and left 5,000 people homeless. In Mozambique, Bonita dropped heavy rainfall and produced flooding, killing as many as 17 people. Floodwaters destroyed 2,500 ha (6,200 acres) of crops and demolished many buildings, including about 12 schools. The remnants of Bonita dropped the heaviest rainfall in 80 years in eastern Zimbabwe, and heavy rainfall also spread into Zambia.

=== Severe Tropical Storm Hubert–Coryna ===
- Severe tropical storm (MFR)
- Category 1 tropical cyclone (SSHWS)
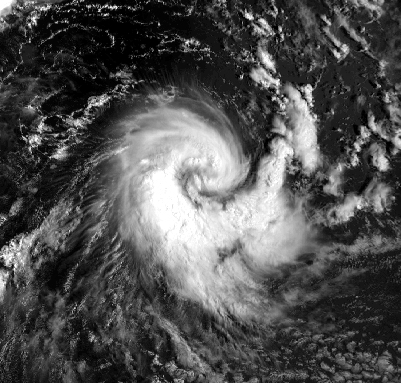
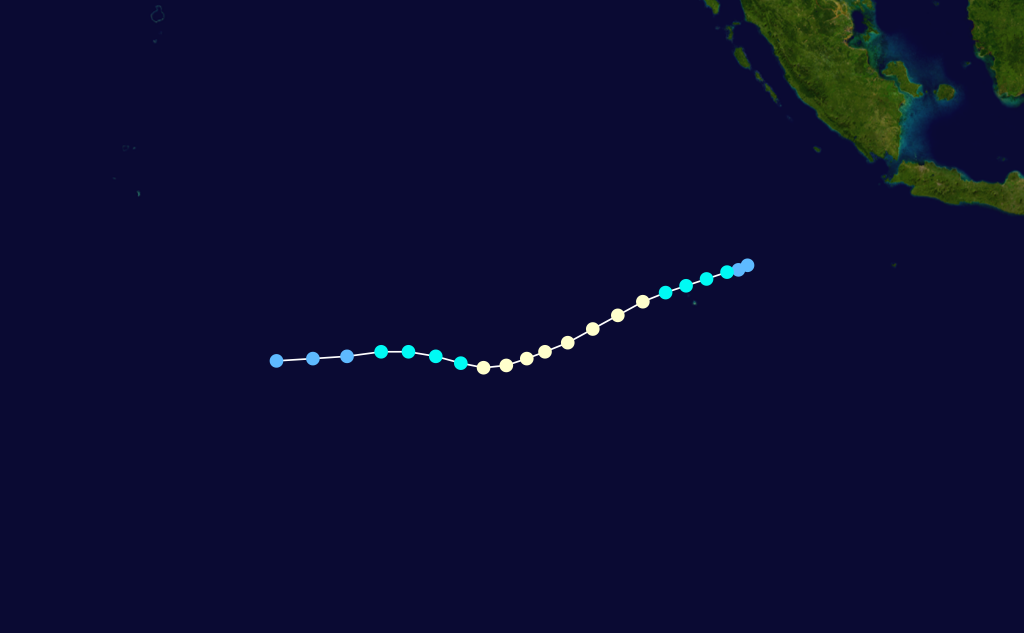
- Duration: January 9 (Entered basin) – January 12
- Peak intensity: 100 km/h (65 mph) (10-min); 965 hPa (mbar)

In the Australian basin, the monsoon trough spawned a tropical disturbance near Christmas Island on January 3. With a ridge to the south, the system tracked to the west-southwest, developing into a tropical low on January 6 and being named Hubert the next day by the BoM. It quickly intensified to reach peak 10‑minutes winds of 150 km/h (95 mph) on January 9 to the north of the Cocos Islands, but later that day began weakening due to increasing wind shear. At around 1800 UTC on January 9, Hubert crossed into the south-west Indian Ocean with 10‑minute winds of 100 km/h (60 mph), and at that time, was renamed the cyclone Coryna. The wind shear quickly tore the convection away from the center, leaving the circulation exposed by January 10. The next day, Coryna weakened to tropical depression status, and on January 12 the circulation dissipated in the central Indian Ocean.

=== Severe Tropical Storm Doloresse ===
- Severe tropical storm (MFR)
- Category 1 tropical cyclone (SSHWS)
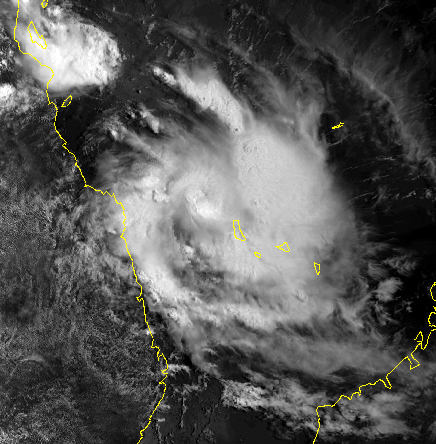
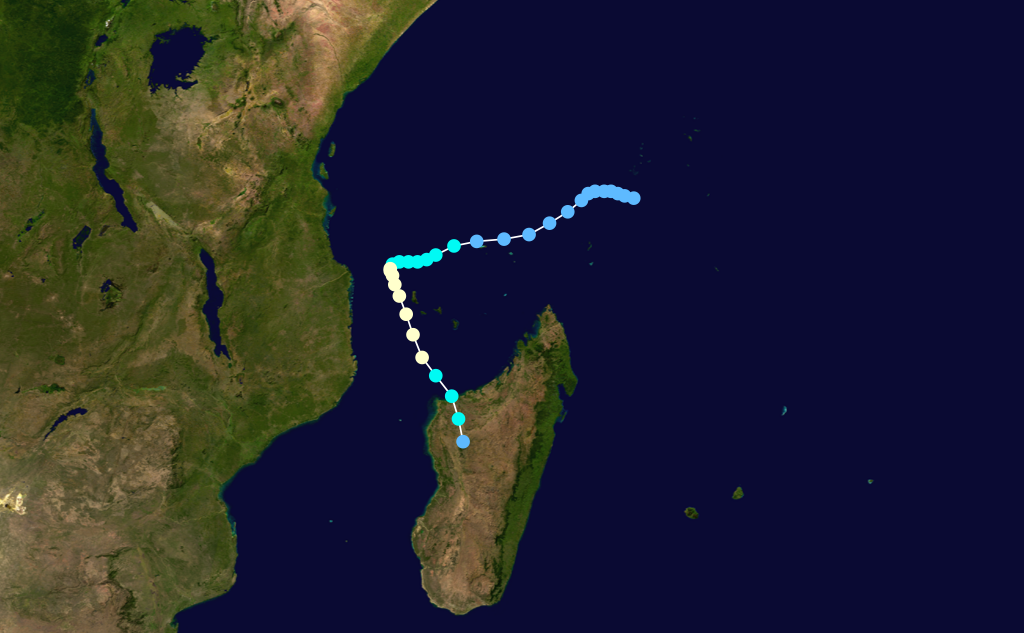
- Duration: February 12 – February 20
- Peak intensity: 95 km/h (60 mph) (10-min); 977 hPa (mbar)

After about a month in which there were no named storms in the basin, a tropical disturbance formed within the ITCZ to the southwest of Seychelles on February 12. It moved slowly to the southwest with a well-defined center and a broad area of convection. For several days, the system remained weak until reaching more favorable conditions on February 16, and the next day it intensified into Tropical Storm Doloresse. The storm slowed while reaching the western extent of a ridge, drifting for nearly 24 hours about 160 km (99 mi) north-northwest of Grande Comore. On February 17, an approaching trough turned Doloresse to the south-southeast, bringing the storm about 55 km (34 mi) southwest of Grande Comore; this made it the first cyclone to directly affect the nation since Cyclone Elinah 13 years prior. On February 17, the JTWC estimated peak 1‑minute winds of 140 km/h (85 mph), and on the next day, the MFR estimated peak 10‑minute winds of 95 km/h (60 mph). Increasing shear caused Doloresse to rapidly weaken to tropical depression status on February 19. Although the JTWC assessed the storm as continuing to the southeast and striking northwestern Madagascar, the MFR estimated the system turned to a southwest drift and dissipated on February 20.

In the Comoros, Doloresse produced strong wind gusts, damaging crops and houses on Grande Comore. Heavy rainfall caused landslides, and the cyclone caused a shipwreck, killing 67 people on the island of Mohéli. The western periphery of the circulation dropped heavy rainfall in Tanzania.

=== Tropical Cyclone Edwige ===
- Tropical cyclone (MFR)
- Category 2 tropical cyclone (SSHWS)
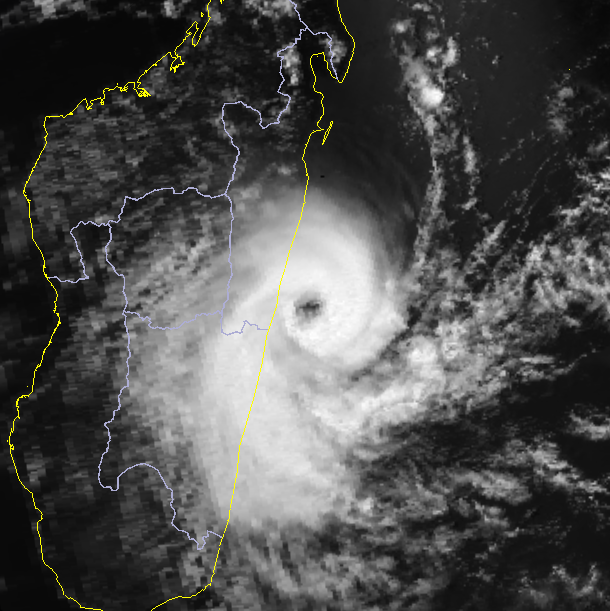
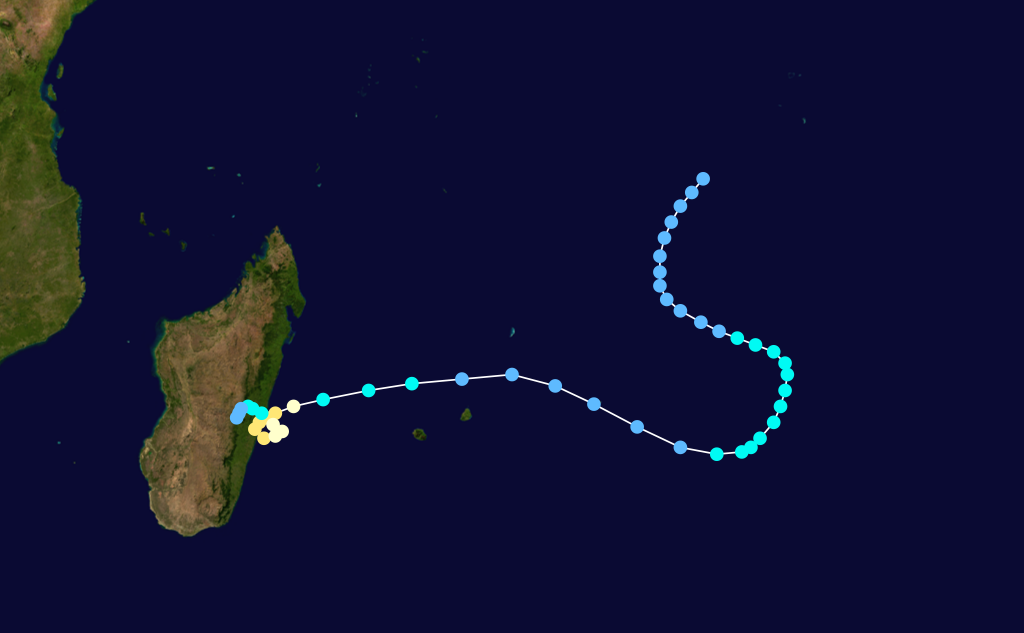
- Duration: February 19 – February 29
- Peak intensity: 150 km/h (90 mph) (10-min); 945 hPa (mbar)

On February 18, a tropical disturbance began forming about 700 km (430 mi) southwest of Diego Garcia, becoming a tropical depression the next day. A trough steered the new system to the southeast, but also prevented significant strengthening due to wind shear. Late on February 21, the MFR upgraded the depression to Tropical Storm Edwige, and the next day the JTWC began tracking it as Tropical Cyclone 16S. When the trough weakened, Edwige turned to the south and later southwest, reaching an initial peak of 75 km/h (45 mph) on February 23. That day, increasing wind shear caused the storm to weaken to minimal tropical storm status, and the JTWC briefly discontinued advisories on February 24. The strengthening ridge caused Edwige to accelerate to the west, bringing it south of Rodrigues without any effects on February 24. On the next day, the storm passed north of Mauritius and Réunion, where it produced wind gusts of 150 km/h (95 mph) and 120 km/h (75 mph), respectively, as well as heavy rainfall. Due to crop damage caused by Edwige, as well as a drought later in the year, Mauritius failed to reach its quota for sugar outputs.

After passing north of Réunion, Edwige began reintensifying due to decreasing wind shear, and the JTWC reissued advisories on February 25. With warm waters, the storm developed increasing outflow as well as an eye. On February 26, Edwige intensified into a tropical cyclone and reached peak 10‑minute winds of 150 km/h (95 mph) while approaching eastern Madagascar. On the same day, the JTWC estimated peak 1‑minute winds of 175 km/h (110 mph). For unknown reasons, Edwige executed a counterclockwise loop along the Malagasy coast near Mananjary. Due to land interaction, the cyclone rapidly weakened and turned to the north-northeast off the coast, although the JTWC assessed the storm as turning inland again. On February 29, Edwige dissipated just off the coast of Toamasina. The storm dropped 369 mm (14.5 in) of rainfall in Mananjary, with wind gusts of 200 km/h (125 mph), but damage was limited.

=== Tropical Cyclone Flossy ===
- Tropical cyclone (MFR)
- Category 4 tropical cyclone (SSHWS)
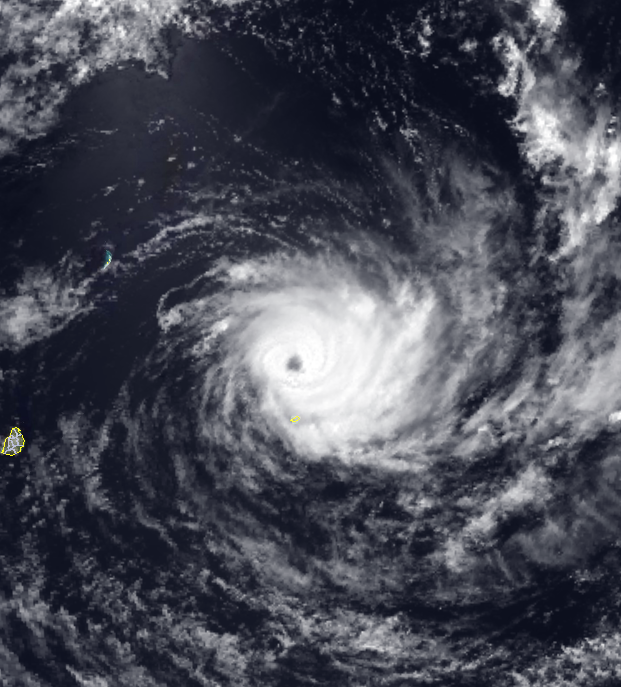
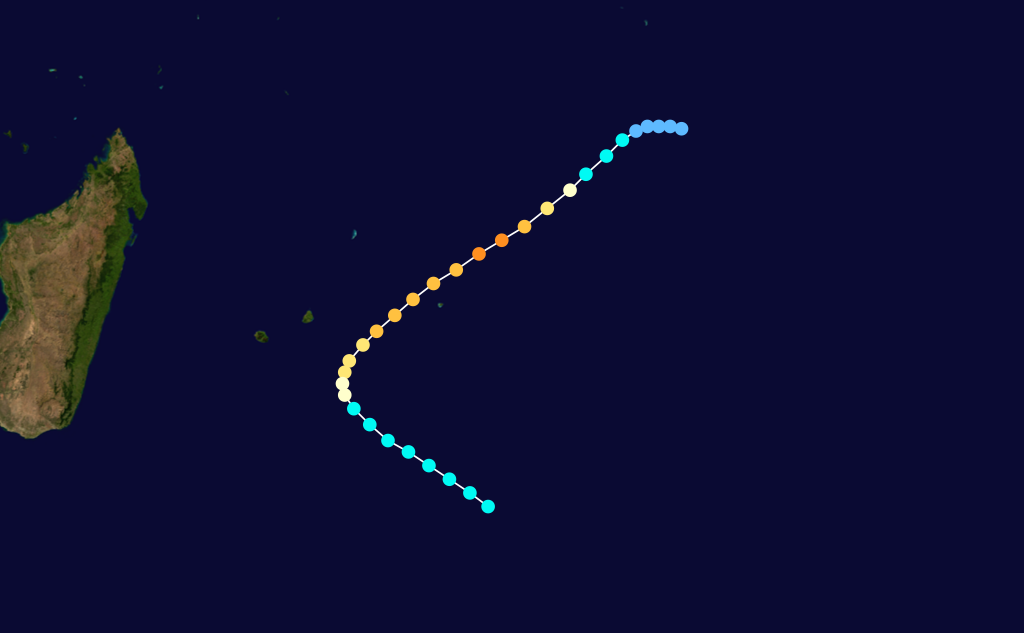
- Duration: February 25 – March 6
- Peak intensity: 150 km/h (90 mph) (10-min); 945 hPa (mbar)

On February 25, a tropical disturbance developed along a cold front about 500 km (310 mi) south-southeast of Diego Garcia. With a ridge to the south, the system tracked southwestward and intensified into Tropical Storm Flossy on February 27. That day, the JTWC began issuing advisories on the storm as Tropical Cyclone 17S. The storm quickly developed an eye, intensifying to tropical cyclone status on February 28. That day, the MFR estimated peak 10‑minute winds of 150 km/h (95 mph), while the JTWC estimated peak 1‑minute winds of 215 km/h (135 mph). Late on February 29, Flossy passed about 80 km (50 mi) northwest of Rodrigues, producing wind gusts of 160 km/h (100 mph) there. Increased wind shear weakened Flossy, beginning on March 1, although the storm restrengthened slightly on March 2. That day, the cyclone rounded the ridge and turned to the south and southeast, and weakened again due to an approaching cold front. On March 4, Flossy became extratropical after all of the convection was sheared away from the circulation. Two days later, the front absorbed the remnants of Flossy.

=== Moderate Tropical Storm Guylianne ===
- Moderate tropical storm (MFR)
- Tropical storm (SSHWS)
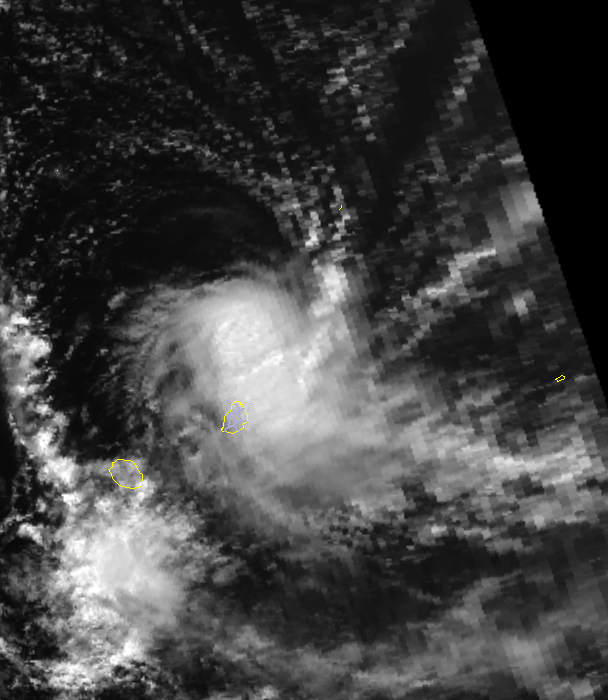
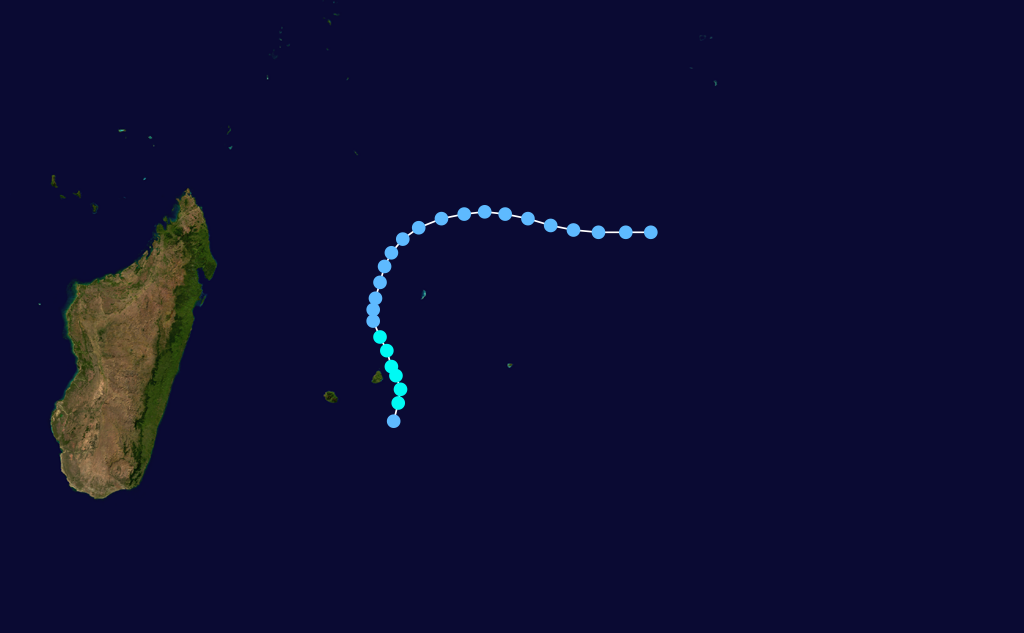
- Duration: March 17 – March 25
- Peak intensity: 65 km/h (40 mph) (10-min); 992 hPa (mbar)

The ITCZ spawned a tropical disturbance on March 17 about 500 km (310 mi) south of Diego Garcia. Due to ongoing wind shear, the system initially failed to intensify while moving westward. An approaching cold front turned the disturbance southward on March 20 into an area of low wind shear, allowing the convection to increase and for the system to be upgraded to tropical depression status. While the system was moving toward Mauritius on March 22, the depression was upgraded to Tropical Storm Guylianne. Later that night, the storm passed about 50 km (31 mi) east of Mauritius, bringing beneficial rainfall. Both MFR and JTWC only estimated peak winds of 65 km/h (40 mph), and Guylianne began weakening on March 23 due to increased wind shear. The storm turned to a southwest drift, dissipating on March 25.

=== Tropical Cyclone Hansella ===
- Tropical cyclone (MFR)
- Category 2 tropical cyclone (SSHWS)
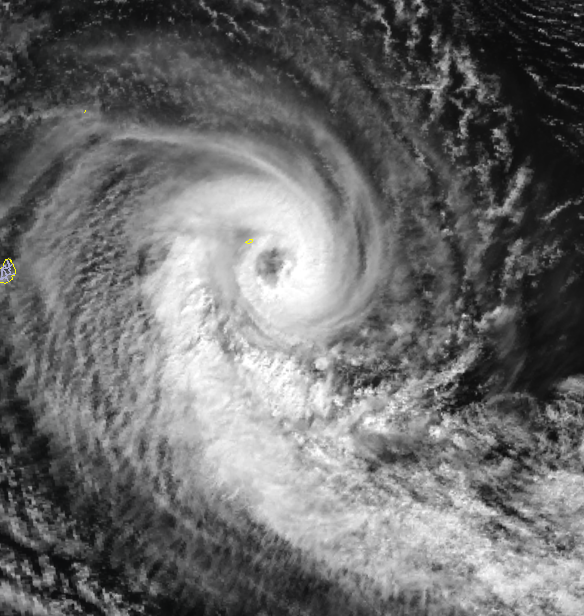
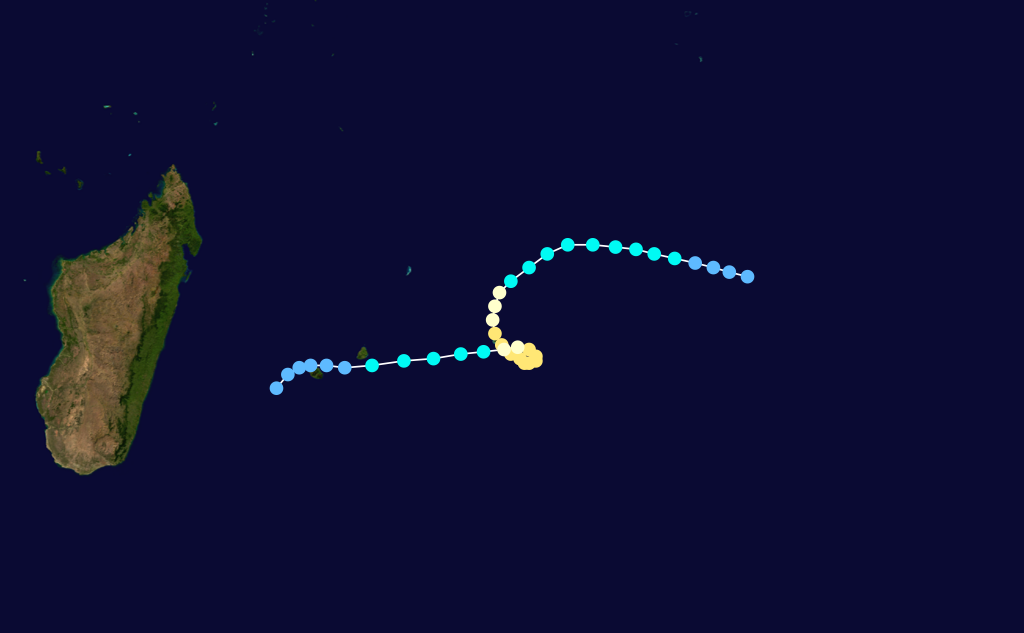
- Duration: April 2 – April 10
- Peak intensity: 120 km/h (75 mph) (10-min); 962 hPa (mbar)

Toward the end of March, the ITCZ was active with several low pressure areas, and an area of convection consolidated south of the Chagos Archipelago in early April. On April 2, a large tropical disturbance formed, and the next day, it was named Hansella despite only being a tropical depression. The system moved westward initially, but curved southward on April 4 due to a trough, by which time it had intensified into a tropical storm. After developing a 50 km (31 mi) wide eye, Hansella intensified to tropical cyclone status on April 6 and moved over Rodrigues. Gusts on the island reached 180 km/h (110 mph), which caused heavy damage to crops and houses. Hansella dropped 182 mm (7.2 in) of rainfall on Rodrigues in a 24‑hour period, greater than the island's monthly average total.

According to the MFR, Hansella failed to intensify beyond 10‑minute winds of 120 km/h (75 mph), although the JTWC estimated peak 1‑minute winds of 175 km/h (110 mph). The cyclone looped to the west after passing over Rodrigues, influenced by a building ridge to the south. Due to upwelling after moving slowly over the same waters, Hansella weakened quickly and passed about 100 km (62 mi) south of Rodrigues as a minimal tropical storm. On April 9, the storm passed just south of Mauritius, and the next day spawned a large area of convection over Réunion, dropping heavy rainfall. On April 10, Hansella dissipated just northwest of Réunion.

=== Intense Tropical Cyclone Itelle ===
- Intense tropical cyclone (MFR)
- Category 5 tropical cyclone (SSHWS)
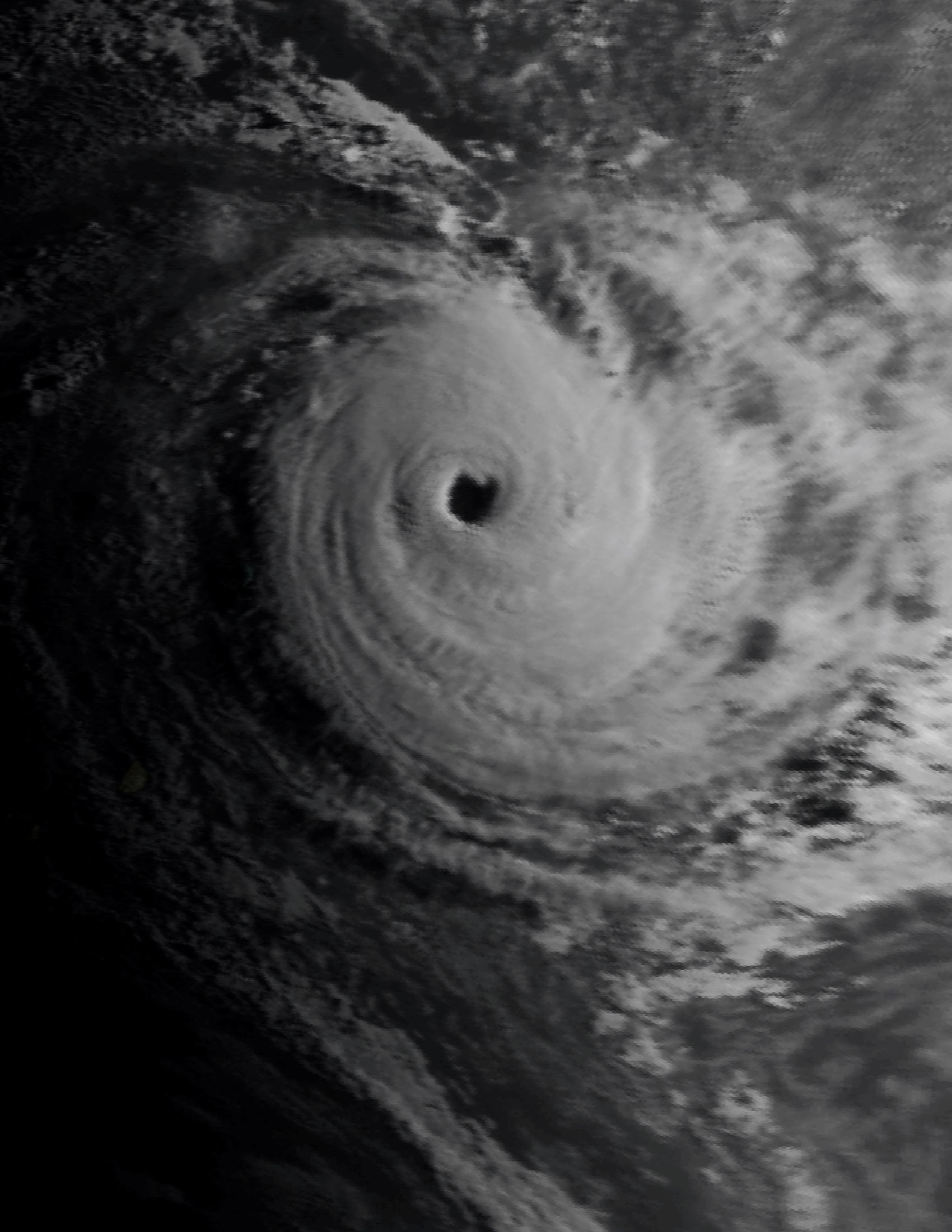
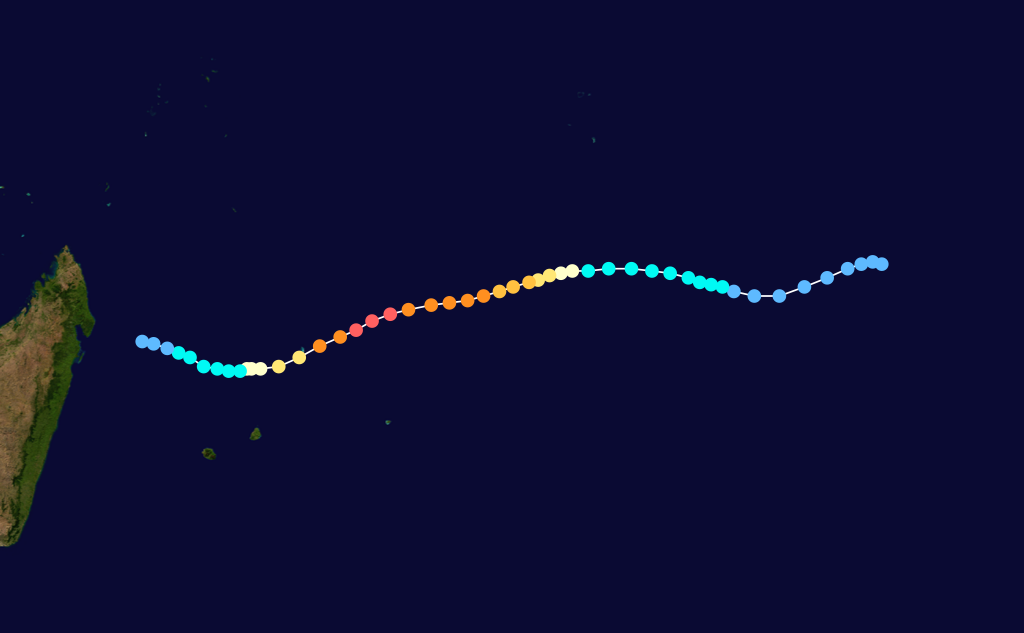
- Duration: April 6 – April 19
- Peak intensity: 175 km/h (110 mph) (10-min); 925 hPa (mbar)

A low-pressure area persisted east-southeast of Diego Garcia on April 6, developing into a tropical disturbance that day. With a ridge to the south, the system moved generally westward, slowly intensifying. Convection gradually increased, and the system intensified into Tropical Storm Itelle on April 9. An eye developed the next day, signaling that the storm had strengthened into a tropical cyclone as it turned more to the west-southwest. Developing a large 90 km (56 mi) wide eye, Itelle intensified further, and the MFR estimated peak 10‑minute winds of 175 km/h (110 mph) on April 12. This made it an unusual April intense tropical cyclone. On April 14, the JTWC estimated peak 1‑minute winds of 260 km/h (160 mph), equivalent to a Category 5 on the Saffir–Simpson hurricane wind scale. That day, increasing wind shear weakened Itelle, and the cyclone was downgraded to severe tropical storm status by April 15 when it passed about 15 km (9.3 mi) south of St. Brandon. Wind gusts on the island reached 150 km/h (95 mph). Itelle slowed on April 16 while passing about 400 km (250 mi) north of Réunion, which was followed by increased shear and weakening. On April 19, Itelle dissipated about 100 km (62 mi) east of the eastern Madagascar coastline.

=== Moderate Tropical Storm Jenna ===
- Moderate tropical storm (MFR)
- Tropical storm (SSHWS)
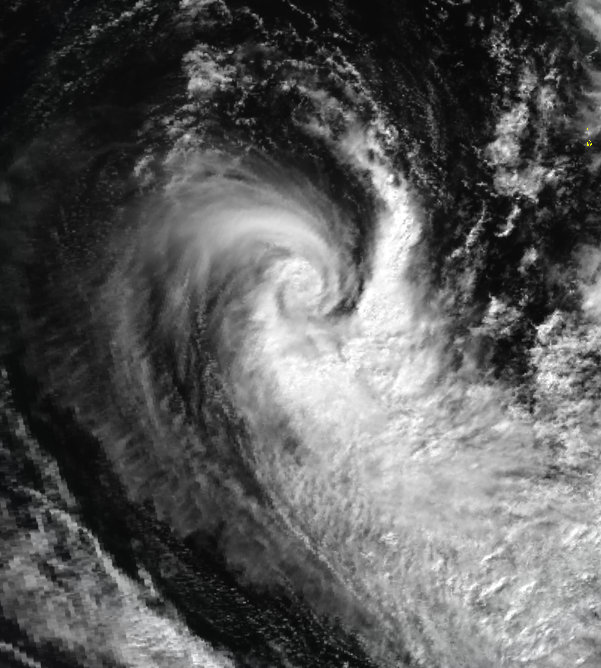
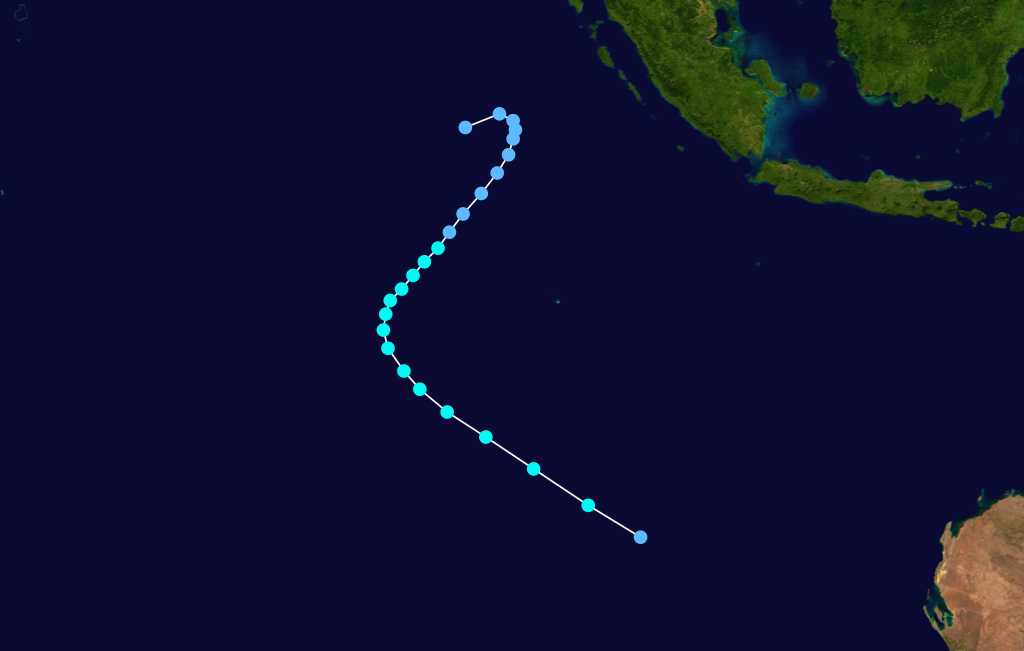
- Duration: May 4 (Entered basin) – May 5 (Exited basin)
- Peak intensity: 85 km/h (50 mph) (10-min); 984 hPa (mbar)

In early May, a westerly wind burst associated with the Madden–Julian oscillation produced disturbances on both sides of the equator in the eastern Indian Ocean. The BoM estimated that a tropical low formed west of Sumatra at the low latitude of 4.8° S, near the boundary between the Australian and the south-west Indian basins; this caused difficulty with regard to tropical cyclone warnings. On May 3, the JTWC upgraded the system to tropical storm status. On the next day, the low crossed into the south-west Indian Ocean, intensifying into Tropical Storm Jenna. The MFR estimated peak 10‑minute winds of 85 km/h (55 mph) on May 5. Soon after, an approaching trough turned the storm to the southeast, bringing Jenna back into the Australian region, and absorbing the storm on May 6.

== See also ==
- List of Southern Hemisphere tropical cyclone seasons
- Atlantic hurricane seasons: 1995, 1996
- Pacific hurricane seasons: 1995, 1996
- Pacific typhoon seasons: 1995, 1996
- North Indian Ocean cyclone seasons: 1995, 1996
