= 1995–96 Australian region cyclone season =

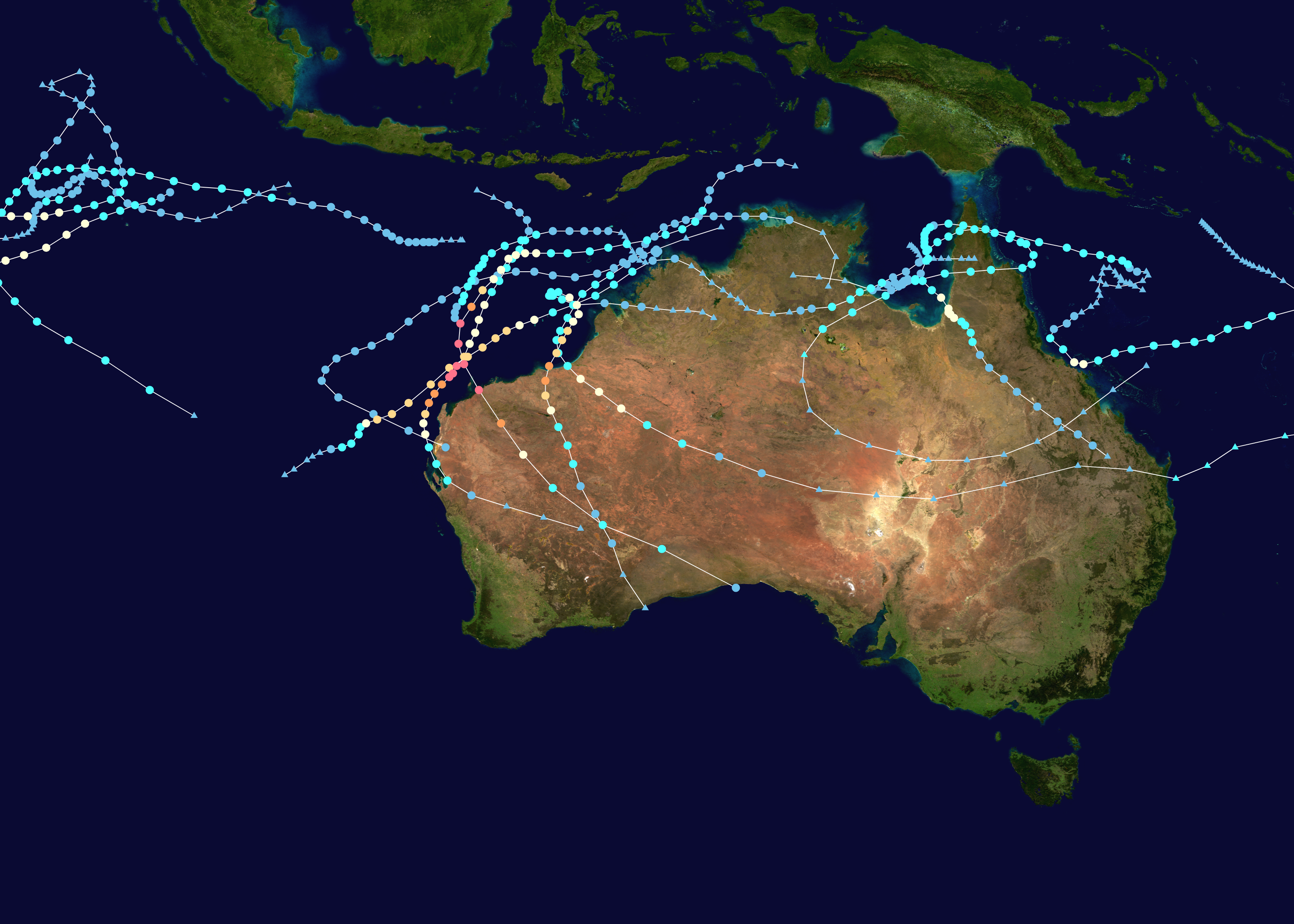
- Season summary map

Seasonal boundaries
- First system formed: 16 November 1995
- Last system dissipated: 6 May 1996

Strongest storm
- Name: Olivia
  - Maximum winds: 195 km/h (120 mph) (10-minute sustained)
  - Lowest pressure: 925 hPa (mbar)

Seasonal statistics
- Tropical lows: 19
- Tropical cyclones: 14 official, 1 unofficial
- Severe tropical cyclones: 9
- Total fatalities: 1 direct
- Total damage: $58.5 million (1996 USD)

Related articles
- 1995–96 South-West Indian Ocean cyclone season; 1995–96 South Pacific cyclone season

The 1995–96 Australian region cyclone season was an active Australian cyclone season, with Western Australia experiencing a record number of landfalling intense storms in the Pilbara region. The season produced a total of 19 tropical cyclones, of which 14 developed into named storms and 9 reached severe tropical cyclone status. The strongest of the season was Severe Tropical Cyclone Olivia, which also produced the highest recorded wind gust on record of 408 km/h (253 mph). Though several systems impacted land, the general sparsity of population centres in Australia limits the scale of damage. One person was confirmed to have been killed and cumulative losses were estimated at A$77 million (US$58.5 million).

== Systems ==
=== Severe Tropical Cyclone Daryl–Agnielle ===
- Category 3 severe tropical cyclone (Australian scale)
- Category 1 tropical cyclone (SSHWS)
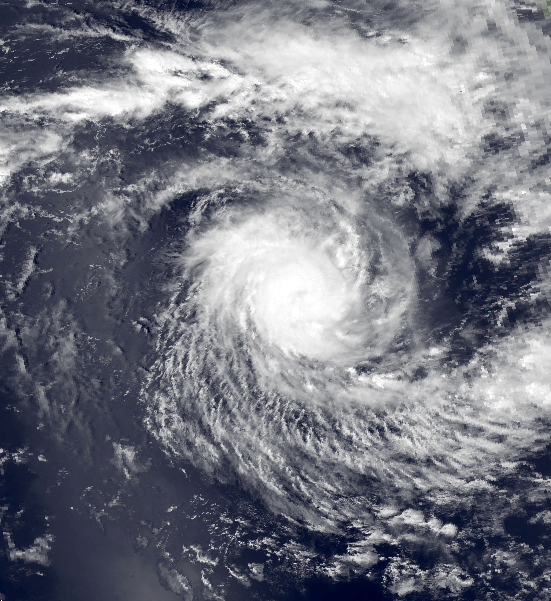
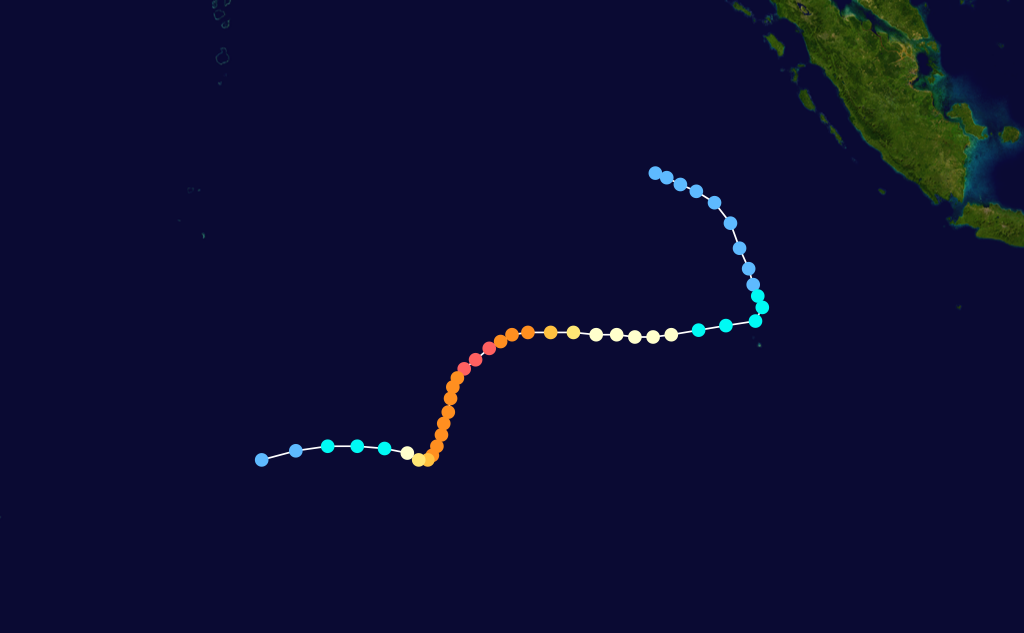
- Duration: 16 November – 19 November (Exited basin)
- Peak intensity: 120 km/h (75 mph) (10-min); 965 hPa (mbar)

The first storm of the year and most intense across the Southern Hemisphere during the 1995–96 seasons, Cyclone Daryl was first identified several hundred kilometres west of Sumatra on 16 November. Initially tracking south-eastward, the system gradually attained gale-force winds as it neared the Cocos Islands late on 17 November. Squally conditions and heavy rain impacted the islands but no damage took place. Low wind shear allowed for further strengthening; a mid-level ridge south of the system forced Daryl to turn towards the west. Early on 19 November, the storm intensified into a severe tropical cyclone and attained winds of 130 km/h (80 mph) before crossing 90°E and entering the Mauritius area of responsibility. Upon crossing this border, Daryl was assigned a second name, Agnielle, by Mauritius. Over the following days, the system further deepened, peaking in strength as a Category 3 on the Australian intensity scale with 205 km/h (125 mph) and a barometric pressure of 915 hPa (mbar; 27.02 inHg). Steady weakening took place due to markedly stronger wind shear. Cyclone Daryl-Agnielle was last noted as a weak low pressure center on 25 November over the open waters of the southern Indian Ocean.

=== Tropical Cyclone Emma ===
- Category 1 tropical cyclone (Australian scale)
- Tropical storm (SSHWS)
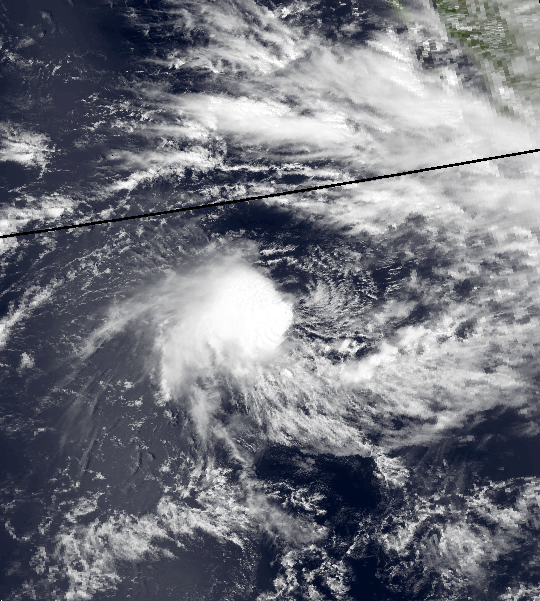
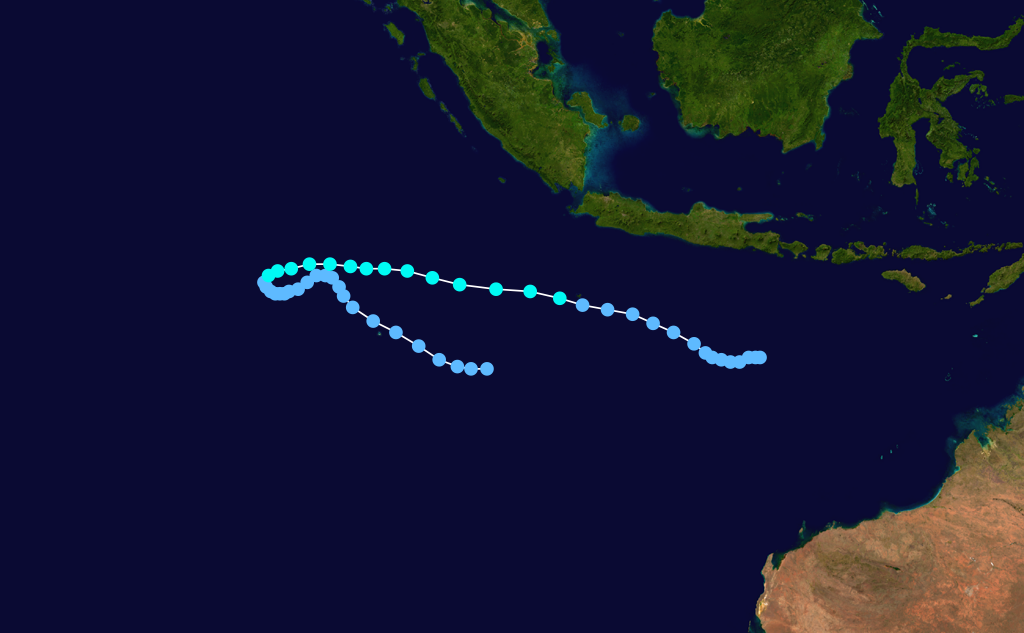
- Duration: 2 December – 16 December
- Peak intensity: 75 km/h (45 mph) (10-min); 990 hPa (mbar)

Emma stayed well off the Australian coast in the Indian Ocean. It spent most of its duration as a tropical low.

=== Severe Tropical Cyclone Frank ===
- Category 4 severe tropical cyclone (Australian scale)
- Category 4 tropical cyclone (SSHWS)
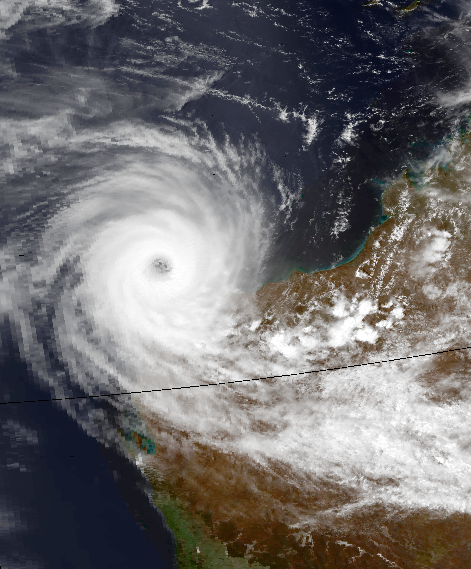
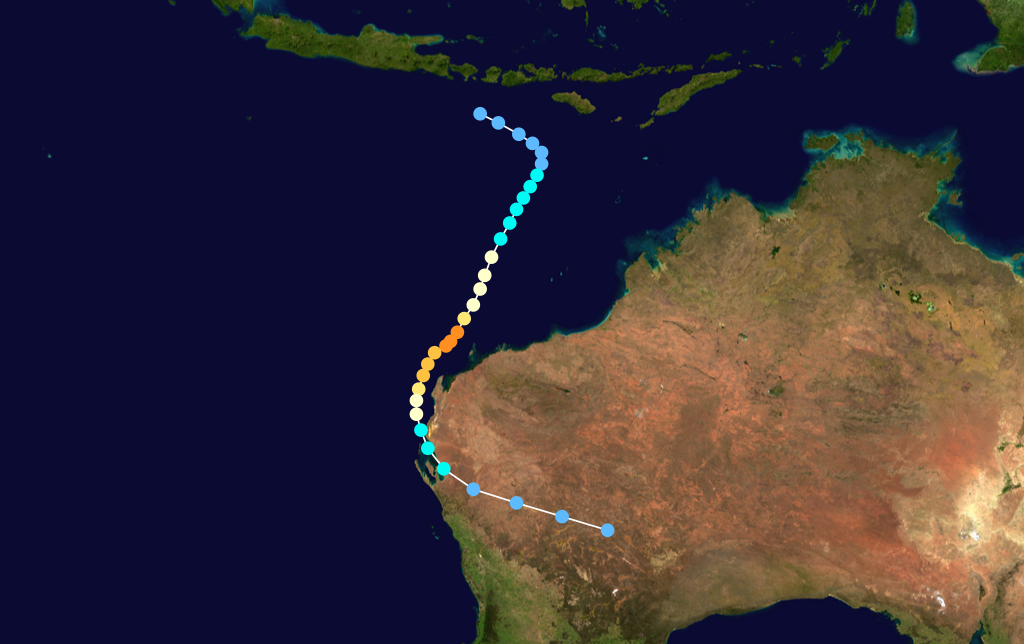
- Duration: 6 December – 13 December
- Peak intensity: 175 km/h (110 mph) (10-min); 950 hPa (mbar)

It formed on 6 December 1995, and was the first cyclone to form in northwest coast of Australia during the 95/96 season. Cyclone Frank brought heavy winds and rains to the Pilbara coast. Frank was one of four cyclones to strike in that area.

=== Severe Tropical Cyclone Gertie ===
- Category 3 severe tropical cyclone (Australian scale)
- Category 1 tropical cyclone (SSHWS)
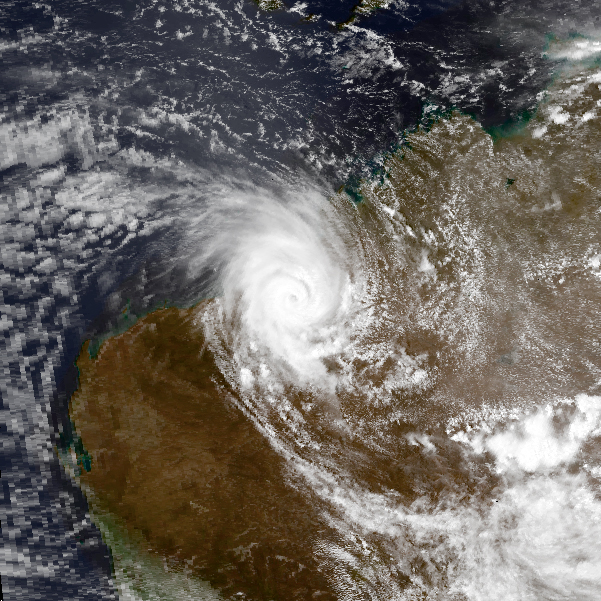
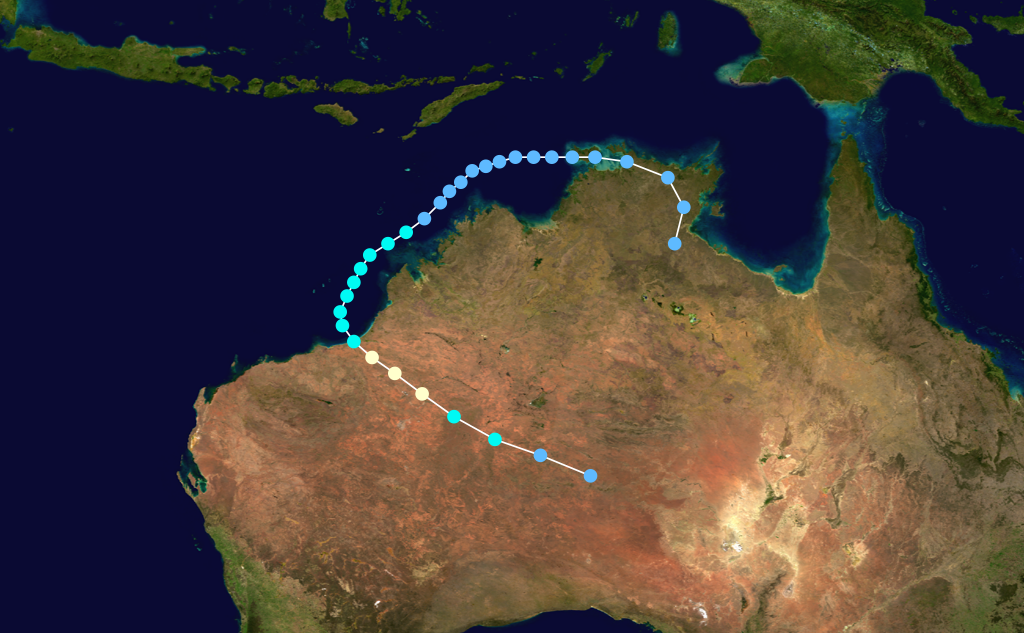
- Duration: 17 December – 24 December
- Peak intensity: 140 km/h (85 mph) (10-min); 965 hPa (mbar)

A tropical low formed in the Timor Sea on 16 December and tracked west-southwest as it deepened slowly. The low crossed into the WA region on 17 December and was named Gertie on the afternoon of the 18th. The cyclone then moved towards the south-southwest during the 19th but slowed to be almost stationary during the late afternoon and evening of that day. Gertie then began to move south, then southeastwards, crossing the coast near Mandora Station on 20 December. Gertie then passed to the northeast of Telfer producing near gale-force winds and heavy rain before dissipating on the 21st. The storm did only minor damage.

=== Severe Tropical Cyclone Barry ===
- Category 4 severe tropical cyclone (Australian scale)
- Category 1 tropical cyclone (SSHWS)
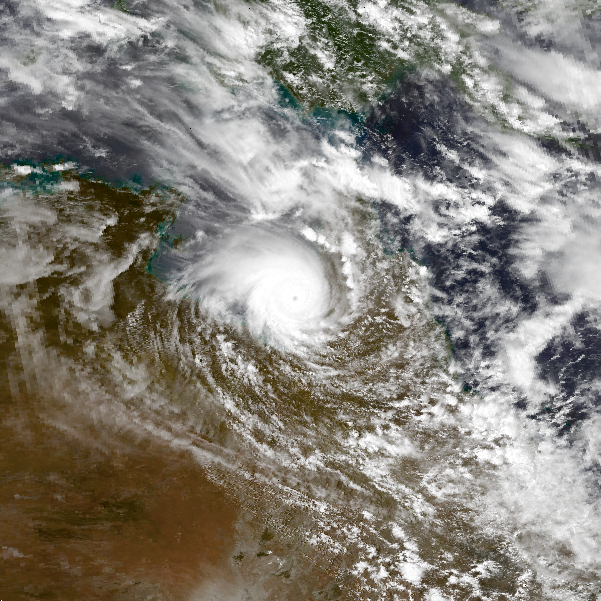
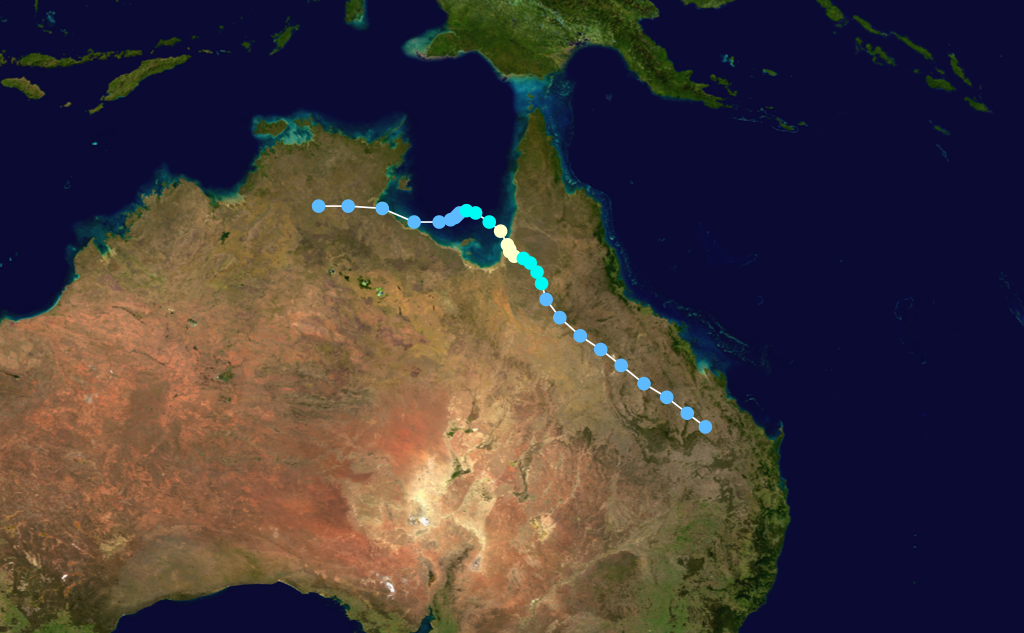
- Duration: 4 January – 7 January
- Peak intensity: 185 km/h (115 mph) (10-min); 950 hPa (mbar)

Barry formed in the Gulf of Carpentaria on 4 January, reaching a maximum intensity of Category 3 (Australian scale) before crossing the coast between Karumba and Kowanyama two days later. Heavy rains caused severe flooding across the southern Cape York Peninsula, however there were no deaths reported.

=== Severe Tropical Cyclone Hubert–Coryna ===
- Category 3 severe tropical cyclone (Australian scale)
- Category 1 tropical cyclone (SSHWS)
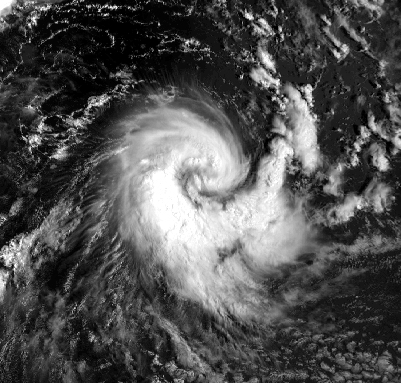
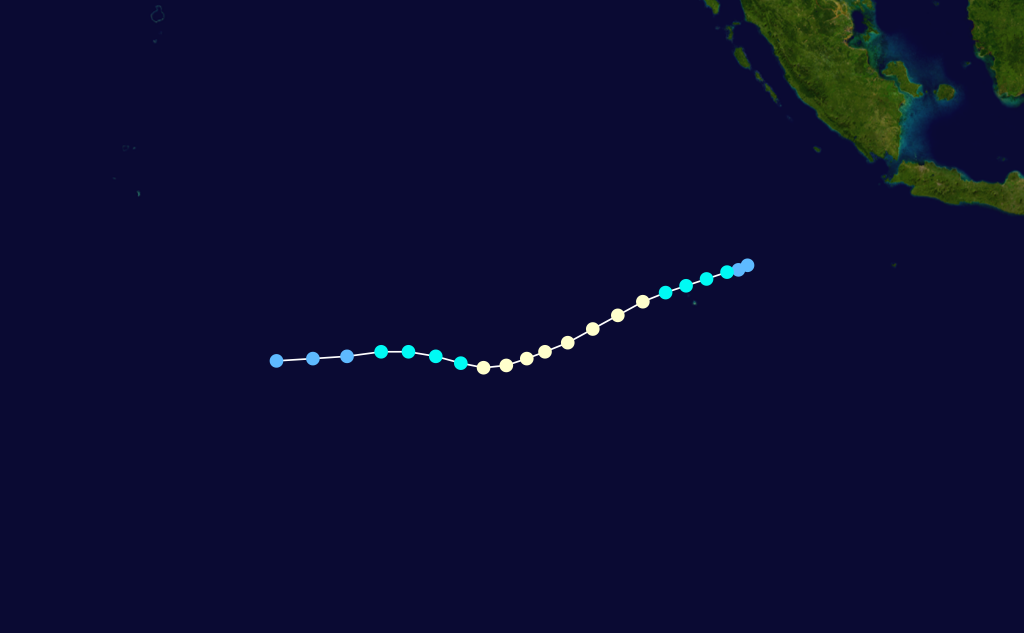
- Duration: 7 January – 9 January (Exited basin)
- Peak intensity: 150 km/h (90 mph) (10-min); 955 hPa (mbar)

Hubert stayed well off the Australian coast in the Indian Ocean from 8 to 12 January 1996.

=== Severe Tropical Cyclone Celeste ===
- Category 3 severe tropical cyclone (Australian scale)
- Category 1 tropical cyclone (SSHWS)
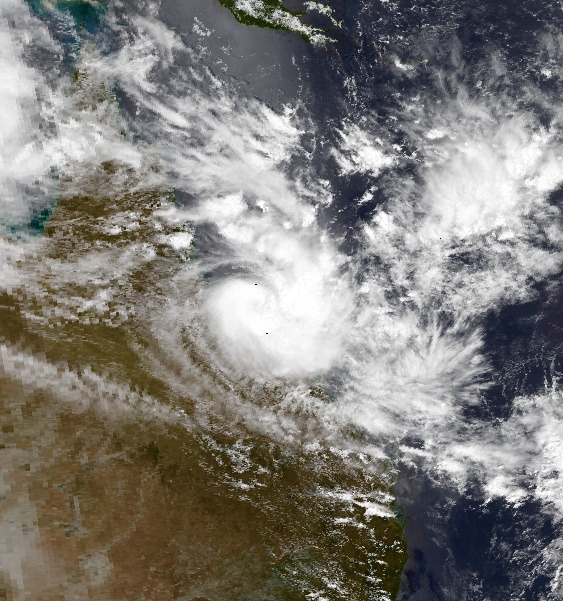
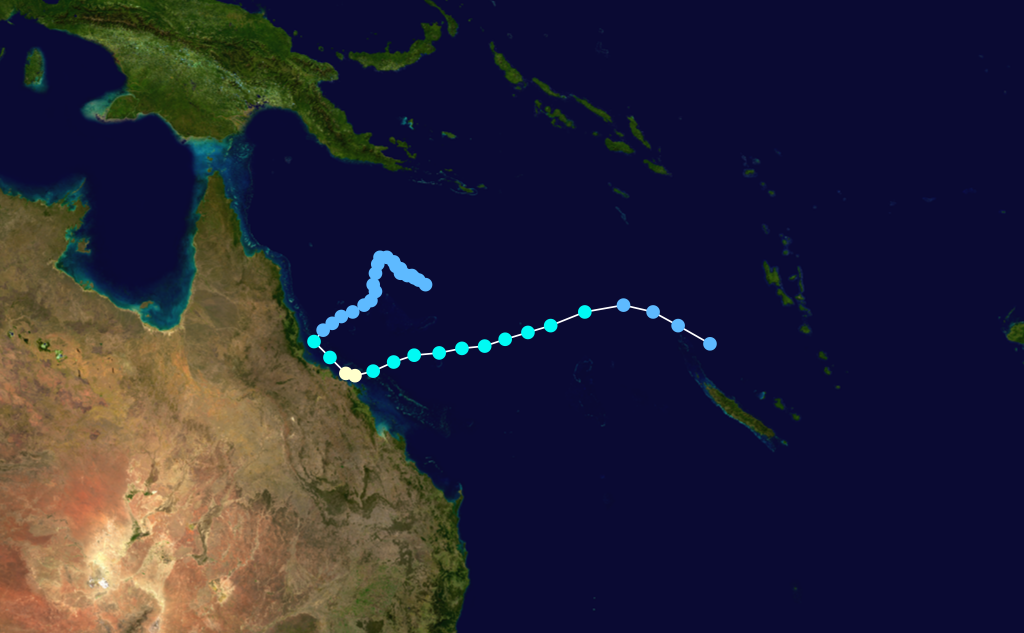
- Duration: 26 January – 29 January
- Peak intensity: 130 km/h (80 mph) (10-min); 965 hPa (mbar)

Celeste formed in the Coral Sea on 26 January 1996, and rapidly intensified into a Category 3 severe tropical cyclone (Australian scale), in part due to its position between equatorial and subtropical upper wind outflow channels. While intensifying it approached the northeastern Australian coast, with its centre coming within 24 km (15 mi) to the north of Bowen, Queensland on 27 January. After dumping heavy rain on the region, Celeste moved back out to sea. As it did, the cyclone passed to the north of the Whitsunday Islands while reaching peak intensity. Subsequently it quickly weakened.

=== Tropical Cyclone Isobel ===
- Category 1 tropical cyclone (Australian scale)
- Tropical storm (SSHWS)
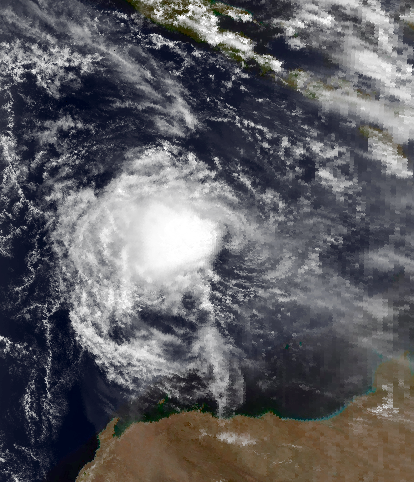
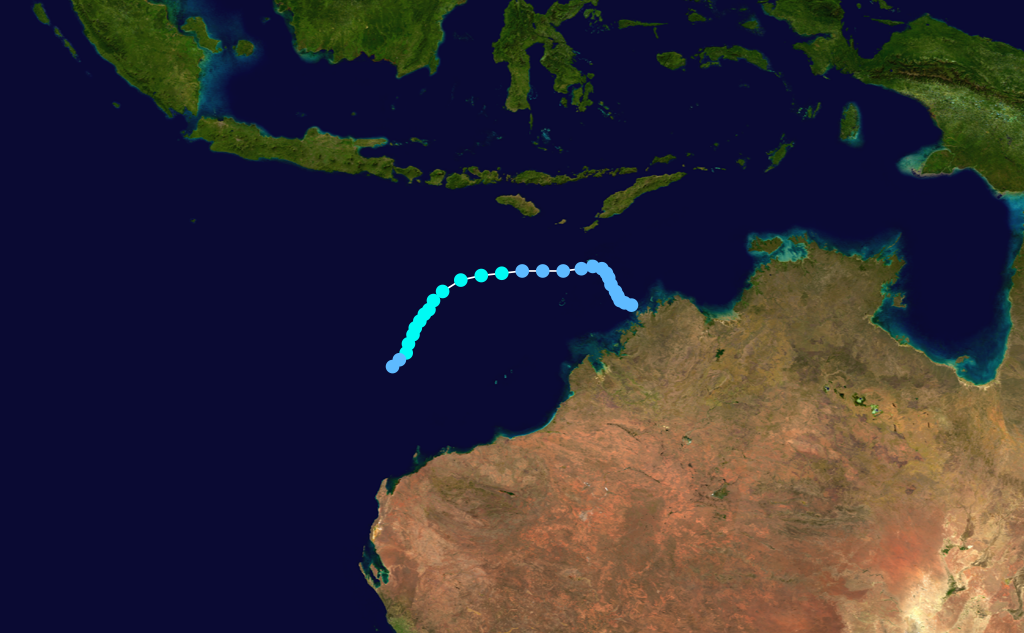
- Duration: 27 January – 1 February
- Peak intensity: 65 km/h (40 mph) (10-min); 995 hPa (mbar)

Isobel only lasted from 27 January 1996 to 1 February in the Timor Sea and did not pass close to any land.

=== Severe Tropical Cyclone Jacob ===
- Category 3 severe tropical cyclone (Australian scale)
- Category 2 tropical cyclone (SSHWS)
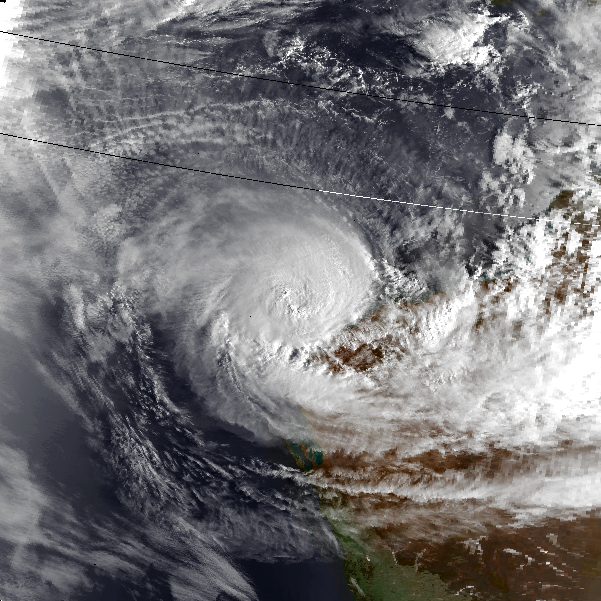
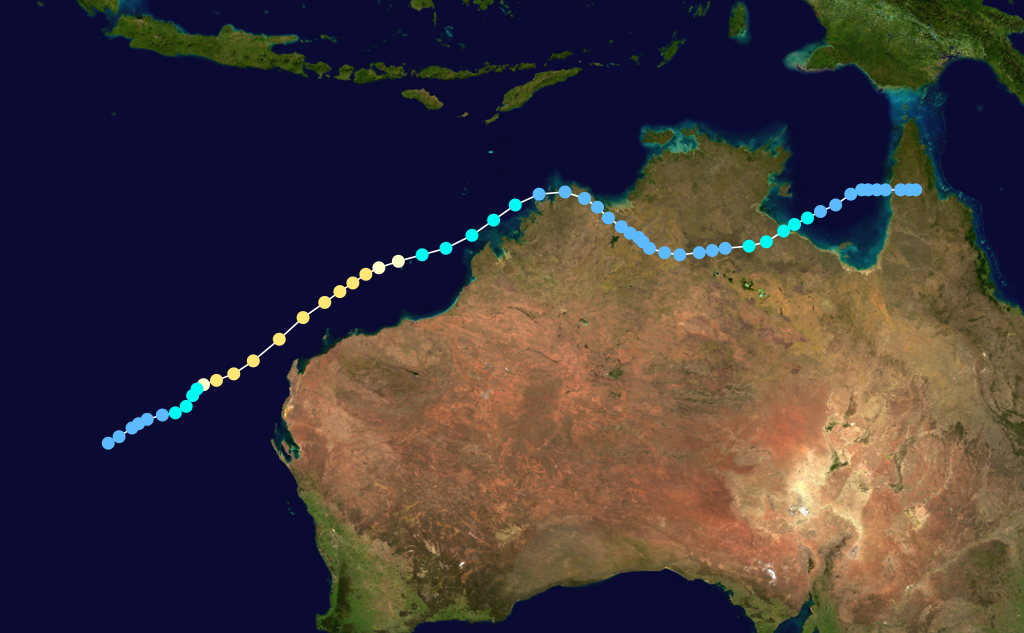
- Duration: 27 January – 8 February
- Peak intensity: 155 km/h (100 mph) (10-min); 955 hPa (mbar)

TC Jacob formed on 1 February 1996 from a monsoonal low that moved across the Northern Territory and the Kimberley region of Western Australia before tracking over the Bonaparte Gulf. It closely followed the Western Australian coast and developed cyclone characteristics near Adele Island. Jacob continued to intensify and moved west-southwestwards, roughly parallel to the Pilbara coast. At peak intensity Jacob was a Category 3 storm with wind gusts near the centre estimated to be 200 kilometres per hour. The Kimberley and Pilbara coastal areas received heavy rains as the cyclone passed offshore. Only minor damage occurred and there were no deaths.

=== Tropical Storm 12S ===
- Tropical storm (SSHWS)
- Duration: 5 February – 10 February (Exited basin)
- Peak intensity: 65 km/h (40 mph) (1-min); 997 hPa (mbar)

A weak storm formed near the edge of the Bureau's area of responsibility in early February. Only the JTWC classified it as a tropical cyclone, reporting peak winds of 65 km/h (40 mph).

=== Tropical Low ===
- Tropical low (Australian scale)
- Duration: 8 February – 11 February
- Peak intensity: 55 km/h (35 mph) (10-min); 997 hPa (mbar)

A tropical low existed from 8 to 11 February.

=== Tropical Low ===
- Tropical low (Australian scale)
- Duration: 14 February – 17 February
- Peak intensity: 55 km/h (35 mph) (10-min); 996 hPa (mbar)

A tropical low existed from 14 to 17 February.

=== Tropical Cyclone Dennis ===
- Category 1 tropical cyclone (Australian scale)
- Tropical storm (SSHWS)
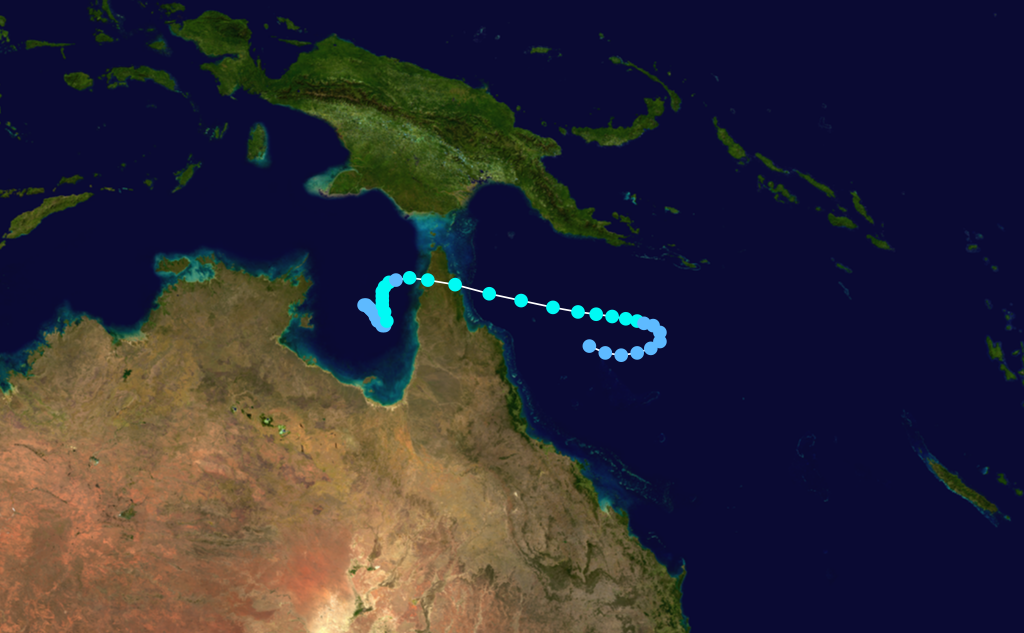
- Duration: 15 February – 18 February
- Peak intensity: 75 km/h (45 mph) (10-min); 990 hPa (mbar)

Tropical Cyclone Dennis existed from 15 to 18 February.

=== Severe Tropical Cyclone Kirsty ===
- Category 4 severe tropical cyclone (Australian scale)
- Category 3 tropical cyclone (SSHWS)
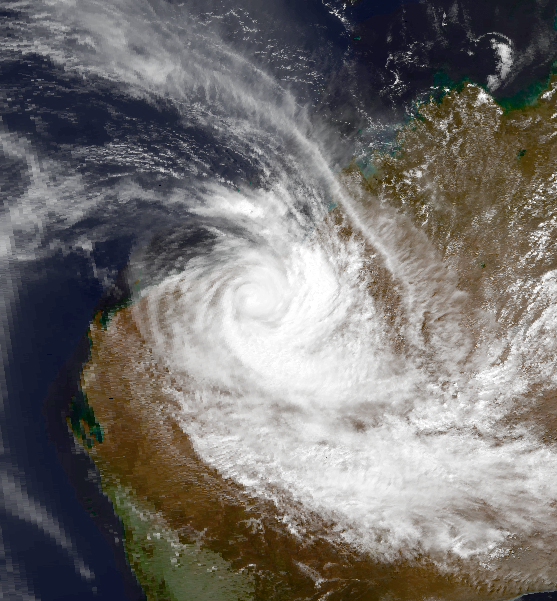
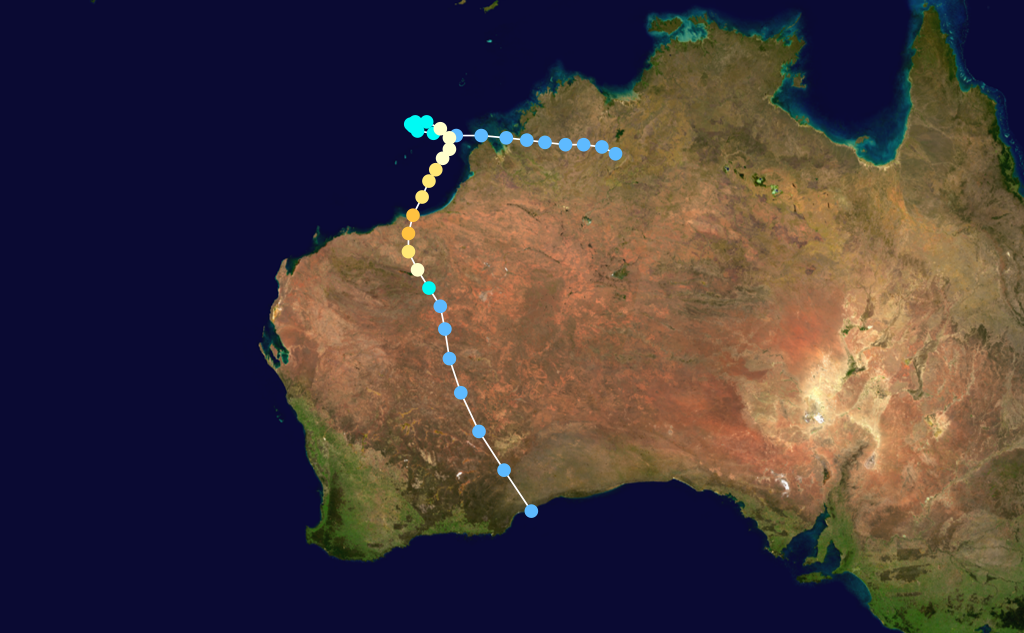
- Duration: 7 March – 14 March
- Peak intensity: 185 km/h (115 mph) (10-min); 935 hPa (mbar)

A strong cyclone, Kirsty crossed the coast at Pardoo Station near Port Hedland on 12 March 1996. The cyclone did considerable damage to tourist cabins and other structures.

=== Tropical Cyclone Ethel ===
- Category 2 tropical cyclone (Australian scale)
- Tropical storm (SSHWS)
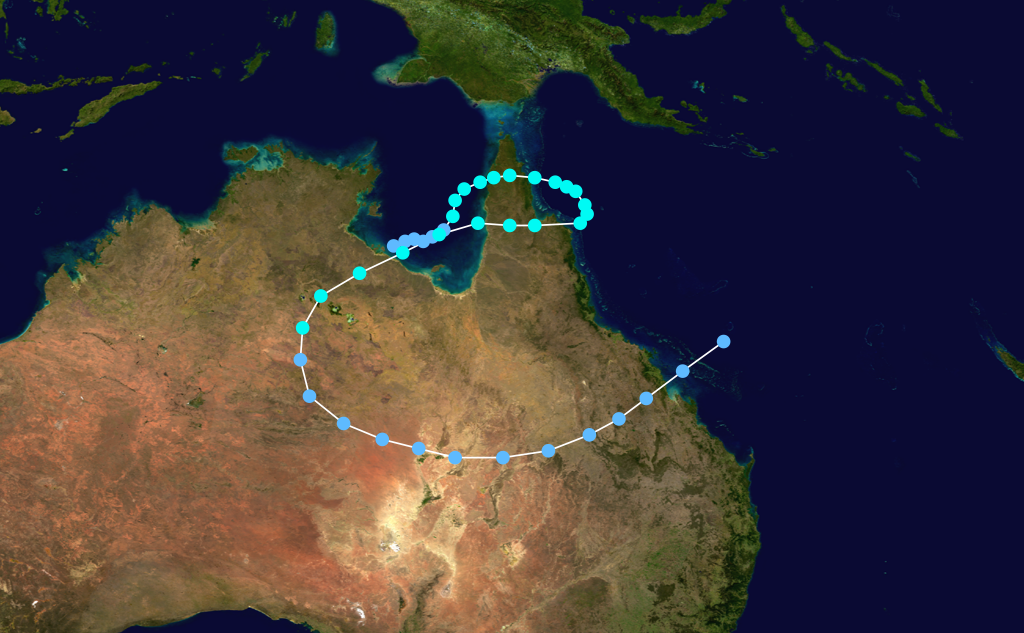
- Duration: 8 March – 13 March
- Peak intensity: 110 km/h (70 mph) (10-min); 980 hPa (mbar)

Twice transited Cape York Peninsula before making a final landfall along the southern coast of the Gulf of Carpentaria, in the Northern Territory. Severe flooding triggered by Cyclone Ethel resulted in A$75 million (US$57 million).

=== Severe Tropical Cyclone Olivia ===
- Category 4 severe tropical cyclone (Australian scale)
- Category 4 tropical cyclone (SSHWS)
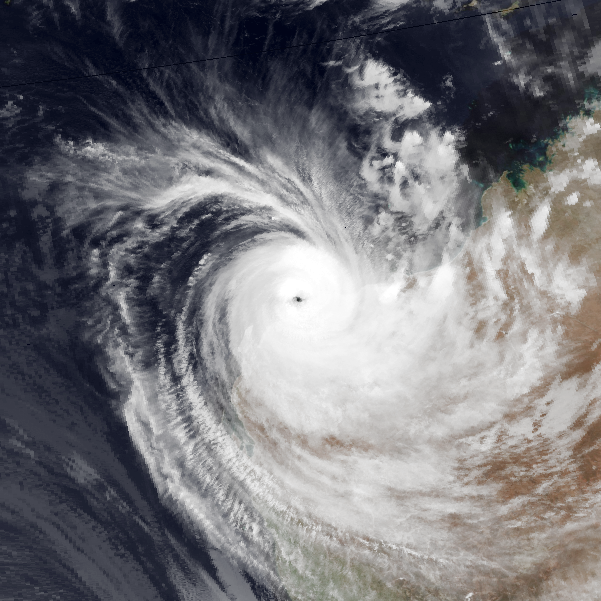
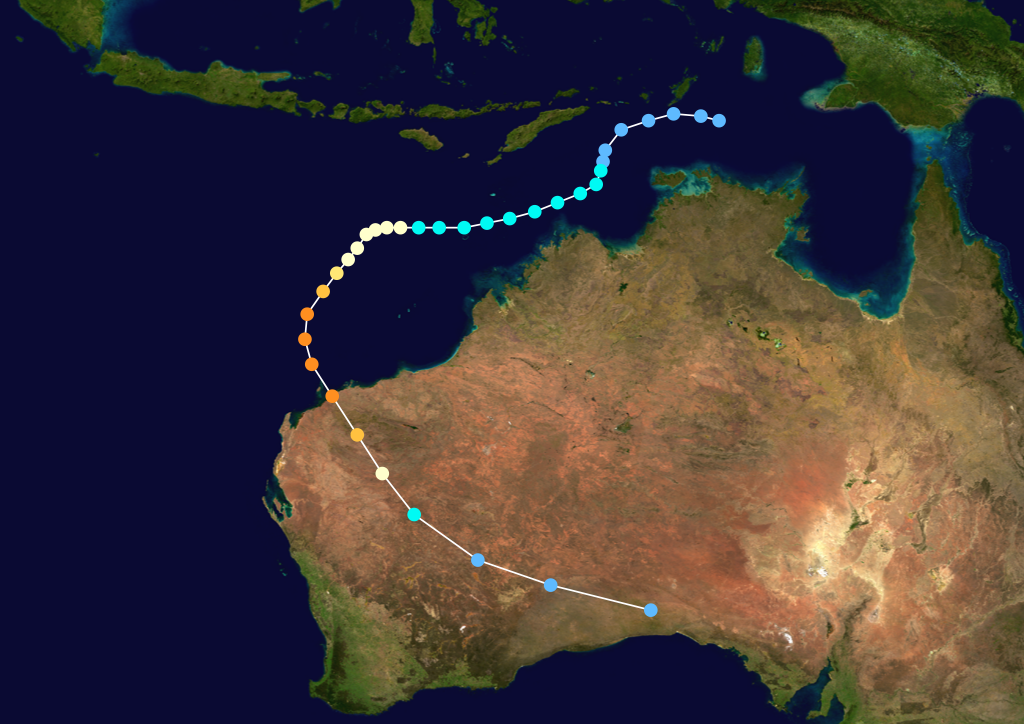
- Duration: 6 April – 12 April
- Peak intensity: 195 km/h (120 mph) (10-min); 925 hPa (mbar)

Lasting from 5 April 1996 to 12 April, Olivia reached Category 4 and destroyed 55 houses (plus 27 damaged) at the mining town of Pannawonica. Several buildings also suffered roof damage at neighbouring Mount Tom Price. There were only 10 minor injuries. A gust of 267 km/h was recorded at Varanus Island which is the equal highest recorded wind gust in Australia. More recently, a review conducted by WMO confirmed a reported gust of 408 km/h on Barrow Island on 10 April 1996, at the peak of the storm, making it the highest gust ever recorded on earth during a non-tornadic storm.

=== Tropical Depression 27S ===
- Tropical depression (SSHWS)
- Duration: 12 April – 19 April
- Peak intensity: 55 km/h (35 mph) (1-min); 1000 hPa (mbar)

Tropical Depression 27S existed from 12 to 19 April.

=== Tropical Cyclone Jenna ===
- Category 2 tropical cyclone (Australian scale)
- Tropical storm (SSHWS)
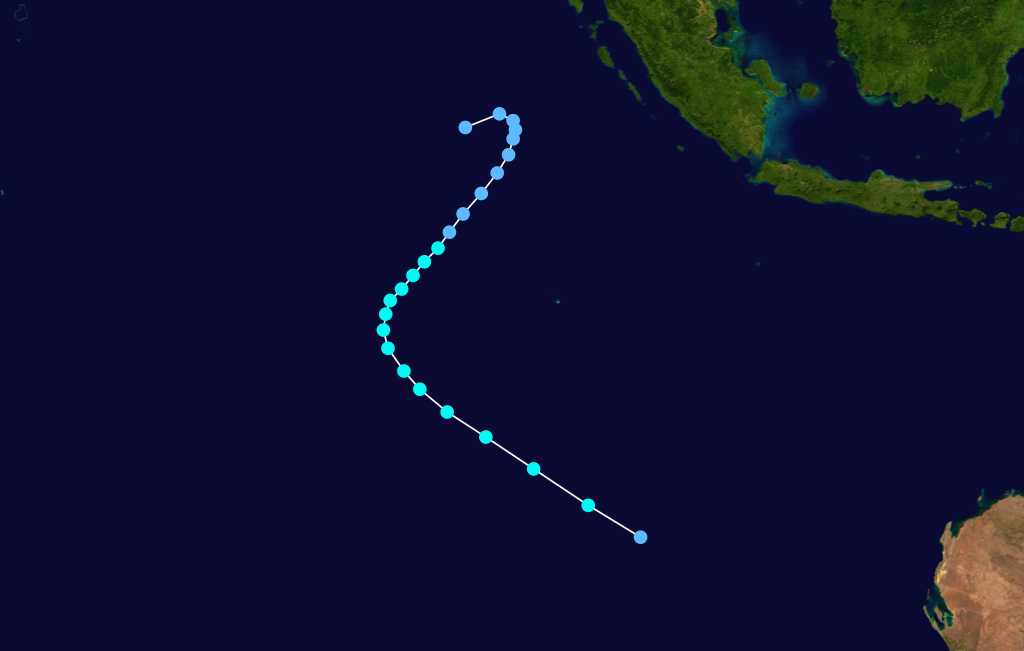
- Duration: 30 April – 6 May (Out of basin 4–5 May)
- Peak intensity: 100 km/h (65 mph) (10-min); 984 hPa (mbar)

Tropical Cyclone Jenna existed from 30 April to 6 May.

=== Tropical Low ===
- Tropical low (Australian scale)
- Duration: 30 April – 5 May
- Peak intensity: 55 km/h (35 mph) (10-min); 997 hPa (mbar)

A tropical low existed in the vicinity of Brisbane from 30 April to 5 May.

== Seasonal effects ==
Name	Dates	Peak intensity			Areas affected	Damage (USD)	Deaths	Ref(s).
Name	Dates	Category	Wind speed	Pressure	Areas affected	Damage (USD)	Deaths	Ref(s).
Emma	2 – 16 December 1995	Category 1 tropical cyclone	75 km/h (45 mph)	990 hPa (29.23 inHg)	Christmas Island	Minor	None	
Frank	6–13 December 1995	Category 4 severe tropical cyclone	175 km/h (110 mph)	950 hPa (28.05 inHg)	Western Australia	Minor	None	
Gertie	17–22 December 1995	Category 3 severe tropical cyclone	140 km/h (85 mph)	965 hPa (28.50 inHg)	Australia		None	
Barry	4–7 January 1996	Category 4 severe tropical cyclone	185 km/h (115 mph)	950 hPa (28.05 inHg)	Queensland	None	None	
Celeste	26–29 January 1996	Category 3 severe tropical cyclone	130 km/h (80 mph)	965 hPa (28.50 inHg)	Queensland		None	
Isobel	27 January – 1 February 1996	Category 1 tropical cyclone	65 km/h (40 mph)	995 hPa (29.38 inHg)	None	None	None	
Dennis	15 – 18 February 1996	Category 1 tropical cyclone	75 km/h (45 mph)	990 hPa (29.23 inHg)	Cape York	None	None	
Ethel	7–13 March 1996	Category 2 tropical cyclone	100 km/h (65 mph)	982 hPa (29.00 inHg)	Queensland, Northern Territory	Unknown	Unknown	
Kirsty	7–14 March 1996	Category 4 severe tropical cyclone	185 km/h (115 mph)	935 hPa (27.61 inHg)	Western Australia		None	
Olivia	5–12 April 1996	Category 4 severe tropical cyclone	195 km/h (120 mph)	925 hPa (27.32 inHg)	Western Australia, South Australia		None	
Jenna	1 – 6 May 1996	Category 2 tropical cyclone	100 km/h (65 mph)	984 hPa (29.06 inHg)	None	None	None	
Unnamed	30 April – 5 May 1996	Tropical low	85 km/h (50 mph)	Not specified	Queensland	None	None	

== Storm names ==
Tropical cyclones are assigned names by the Australian Bureau of Meteorology or Papua New Guinea. Tropical cyclones are named if they are non-frontal low pressure systems of synoptic scale developing over warm waters, or if Dvorak intensity analysis indicate the presence of gale force or stronger winds near the centre. Therefore, tropical systems with gales in one or more quadrants, but not near the centre, are not named. All names assigned in the Australian region are selected sequentially. Only the names used during this cyclone season are listed below. The complete list of names for each basin are found in the World Meteorological Organization's official lists.

Each Australian Tropical Cyclone Warning Centre (Perth, Darwin, and Brisbane) maintained a list of names arranged alphabetically and alternating male and female. Tropical cyclones that develop in the South-East Indian Ocean are assigned names by the Tropical Cyclone Warning Centre in Perth. This region includes the areas east of 90°E, south of the Equator, and west of 125°E. Tropical cyclones that develop south of the Equator between 125°E and 141°E are assigned names by the Tropical Cyclone Warning Centre in Darwin, Northern Territory. This area includes most of the cyclones that form in the Arafura Sea and Western Gulf of Carpentaria. Tropical cyclones in the Coral Sea and Eastern Gulf of Carpentaria between 141°E and 160°E and south of 10°S are assigned names by the Tropical Cyclone Warning Centre in Brisbane, Queensland.

Storms that enter the region that were named by either the Mauritius Meteorological Services or the Fiji Meteorological Service retain their original names. However, those that move from the Australian region into the South-West Indian Ocean (west of 90°E) are renamed by Météo-France. Additionally, the Tropical Cyclone Warning Centre in Port Moresby, Papua New Guinea reserves the right to name cyclones that develop in the Solomon Sea and Gulf of Papua, north of 10°S between 141°E and 160°E. Names issued by Port Moresby are retired after one use.

Perth

- Daryl - Emma - Frank - Gertie - Hubert - Isobel - Jacob - Kirsty

Darwin

- Olivia

Brisbane

- Barry - Celeste - Dennis - Ethel

Additionally, one storm, Jenna, was named by the Mauritius Meteorological Service.

=== Retirement ===
At the end of the season, the Bureau of Meteorology retired seven of the thirteen names used during the season. The names were Frank, Gertie, Kirsty, Barry, Celeste, Ethel and Olivia. The replacement names were Floyd, Glenda, Kara, Bruce, Cecily, Edna and Olwyn. Floyd and Glenda were used in 2006, Kara in 2007, Bruce and Edna in the 2013–14 season and Olwyn in 2015. Cecily was not retained after the naming lists were combined prior to the 2008-09 cyclone season.

== See also ==
- List of Southern Hemisphere tropical cyclone seasons
- Atlantic hurricane seasons: 1995, 1996
- Pacific hurricane seasons: 1995, 1996
- Pacific typhoon seasons: 1995, 1996
- North Indian Ocean cyclone seasons: 1995, 1996
