= Prendergast (surname) =

- Language: Latin, Norman French, Welsh, English, Irish Gaelic

Origin
- Meaning: "of Prendergast"
- Region of origin: Ireland, England, Wales Normandy

Prendergast is an Irish surname of Cambro-Norman origin. It arrived in Ireland via the Norman invasion. The name is most prominent in the counties of Mayo, Tipperary, Kilkenny and Waterford. It is particularly concentrated on a number of islands namley Inishbofin, Inishturk and Clare Island. The Irish language variant of the name is de Priondragás.

== Etymology ==
This toponymic surname may derive from prender from a Germanic word for fire or conflagration (cf. brand) where the b became p due to fortition and gast (cf. geest) from a Germanic word for wasteland or dry and infertile land meaning the location could have been a burn-beat area. Others think the name is a Saxonized form of Bryn y Gest from the Welsh bryn meaning hill and gest a lenition of cest which means belly or swelling or a deep glen between two mountains having but one opening. It could also lessly come from Pren-dwr-gwest, the inn by the tree near the water. The right etymology is probably Pen-dre-gast. The suffix ast (cf. gast) is of Welsh origin like the names of the cromlech chamber tomb of Penllech yr Ast (the chief slab of the bitch) or Llech-yr-ast (Bitch's stone), in Llangoedmor, Cardiganshire or Gwâl y Filiast (Lair of the Greyhound Bitch) or Carn Nant-yr-ast or Llety'r Filiast or Twlc y Filiast. Alternatively, the name may come from a lost Flemish settlement near Ghent, known as Brontegeest. Pembrokeshire had a significant Flemish population by the twelfth century.

== People with the name ==
- Catherine Prendergast, American scholar and intellectual historian
- Charles Prendergast (1863–1948), Canadian-American artist
- Declan Prendergast (born 1981) Irish hurler
- Edmond Francis Prendergast (1843–1918), Irish-born American archbishop
- Frank Prendergast (1933–2015), Irish politician
- George Prendergast (1854–1937), Australian politician from Victoria
- George C. Prendergast (born 1961), American oncologist and biomedical scientist
- Guy Prendergast (British Army officer) (1905–1986), British Army brigadier and Saharan explorer
- Harry Prendergast (1834–1913), British Army general, recipient of the Victoria Cross
- Ian Prendergast (born 1980), Australian footballer
- James Prendergast (disambiguation)
- John Prendergast (disambiguation)
- Kathleen Prendergast (1910–1954), Australian paleontologist and physician
- Kerry Prendergast (born 1953), New Zealand politician
- Kevin Prendergast (racehorse trainer) (1932–2025), Australian-born Irish racehorse trainer
- Kieran Prendergast (born 1942), British diplomat
- Mark Prendergast, Scottish actor
- Mark Prendergast (hurler) (born 1978), Irish hurler
- Mark Prendergast, guitarist for the Irish band Kodaline
- Maurice Prendergast (1858–1924), American painter
- Maurice de Prendergast (fl. 1169–1174), Norman knight
- Mick Prendergast (1950–2010), English footballer
- Mike Prendergast (rugby union) (born 1977), Irish rugby player
- Mike Prendergast (baseball) (1888–1967), American baseball player
- Orla Prendergast (born 2002), Irish cricketer
- Paddy Prendergast (racehorse trainer) (1910–1980), Irish trainer
- Paddy Prendergast (hurler) (born 1958), Irish hurler
- Patrick Prendergast (academic), Irish provost
- Patrick Prendergast (abbot) (c. 1741–1829), last Abbot of Cong and guardian of the Cross of Cong
- Patrick Eugene Prendergast (1868–1894), American assassin
- Paudie Prendergast (born 1960), Irish hurler
- Peter Prendergast (artist) (1946–2007), Welsh artist
- Peter Prendergast (hurler) (fl. 1947–1952), Irish hurler
- Peter Prendergast (referee) (born 1963), Jamaican football referee
- Robert Prendergast (1864–1946), British admiral
- Sam Prendergast, Irish rugby player
- Séamus Prendergast (born 1980), Irish hurler
- Shaun Prendergast (born 1958) British actor, playwright, screenwriter and novelist
- Segismundo Moret y Prendergast (1833–1913), Spanish politician
- Terrence Prendergast (born 1944), Canadian archbishop
- Tessa Prendergast (1928–2001), Jamaican actress, fashion designer, businesswoman and socialite
- Thomas Prendergast (disambiguation)
- Tom Prendergast (Laois footballer) (fl. 1976–1987), Irish football player
- William A. Prendergast (1867–1954), American businessman and politician
- Colin Prendergast (born 1982), Irish Pharmacist

Variants of Prendergast include: Pender, Pendergast, Prandergast, Brandergast, Pendergrass, Penders, Pendy, Pinder, Pinders, Pindy, Prender, Prendergrast, Prendergest, Prindergast, Pendergist and the (Gaelicised) de Priondargás.

== In Britain ==
The surname may be connected to one or more of three places in Britain: Prendergast, now a suburb of Haverfordwest, Pembrokeshire, Wales; Prendergast, near Solva, also in Pembrokeshire, and; Prenderguest, near Ayton, Berwickshire, Scotland.

== In Ireland ==
In Ireland, Prendergast is regarded as a Hiberno-Norman name and is usually derived from a 12th-century Cambro-Norman knight, Maurice de Prendergast, who was born in Pembrokeshire and came to Ireland with the Earl of Pembroke, Richard "Strongbow" de Clare. Many of Maurice de Prendergast's immediate descendants lived in County Tipperary and southern Mayo. Some assumed the name Fitzmaurice at an early date and some of the Fitzmaurices were later known as MacMorris.

== See also ==
- Prendergast baronets
