= List of United Kingdom locations: Pr-Pz =

The United Kingdom

This is part of the list of United Kingdom locations: a gazetteer of place names in the United Kingdom showing each place's locality and geographical coordinates.

== Pr ==
Location	Locality	Coordinates (links to map & photo sources)	OS grid reference
Praa Sands	Cornwall	50.10°N 05.38°W	SW5828
Prabost	Highland	57.45°N 06.30°W	NG4249
Pratling Street	Kent	51.30°N 00.49°E	TQ7459
Pratt's Bottom	Bromley	51.33°N 00.10°E	TQ4762
Prawle Point	Devon	50.20°N 03.71°W	SX774351
Praze-an-Beeble	Cornwall	50.16°N 05.32°W	SW6335
Prees	Shropshire	52.89°N 02.67°W	SJ5533
Preesall	Lancashire	53.91°N 02.97°W	SD3647
Preesall Park	Lancashire	53.90°N 02.96°W	SD3746
Prees Green	Shropshire	52.87°N 02.65°W	SJ5631
Preesgweene	Shropshire	52.90°N 03.05°W	SJ2935
Prees Heath	Shropshire	52.92°N 02.67°W	SJ5537
Preeshenlle	Shropshire	52.89°N 03.04°W	SJ3034
Prees Higher Heath	Shropshire	52.91°N 02.65°W	SJ5635
Prees Lower Heath	Shropshire	52.88°N 02.64°W	SJ5732
Prees Wood	Shropshire	52.89°N 02.65°W	SJ5633
Prenbrigog	Flintshire	53.16°N 03.10°W	SJ2664
Prendergast (Haverfordwest)	Pembrokeshire	51.81°N 04.96°W	SM9516
Prendergast (Solva)	Pembrokeshire	51.87°N 05.19°W	SM8024
Prenderguest	Scottish Borders	55.82°N 02.14°W	NT9159
Pren-gwyn	Ceredigion	52.07°N 04.30°W	SN4244
Prenteg	Gwynedd	52.94°N 04.11°W	SH5841
Prenton	Wirral	53.36°N 03.05°W	SJ3086
Prescot	Knowsley	53.42°N 02.81°W	SJ4692
Prescott	Devon	50.91°N 03.31°W	ST0814
Prescott	Gloucestershire	51.95°N 02.03°W	SO9829
Prescott (Stottesdon)	Shropshire	52.42°N 02.50°W	SO6681
Prescott (Baschurch)	Shropshire	52.78°N 02.86°W	SJ4221
Presdales	Hertfordshire	51.79°N 00.02°W	TL3613
Preshome	Moray	57.63°N 02.98°W	NJ4161
Presnerb	Angus	56.77°N 03.34°W	NO1866
Press	Derbyshire	53.18°N 01.46°W	SK3665
Pressen	Northumberland	55.60°N 02.27°W	NT8335
Prestatyn	Denbighshire	53.32°N 03.41°W	SJ0682
Prestbury	Cheshire	53.29°N 02.15°W	SJ9077
Prestbury	Gloucestershire	51.90°N 02.04°W	SO9723
Presteigne / Llanandras	Powys	52.27°N 03.01°W	SO3164
Presthope	Shropshire	52.56°N 02.62°W	SO5897
Prestleigh	Somerset	51.15°N 02.53°W	ST6340
Prestolee	Bolton	53.54°N 02.37°W	SD7505
Preston	Brent	51.56°N 00.29°W	TQ1887
Preston	Brighton and Hove	50.83°N 00.15°W	TQ3006
Preston (Teignbridge)	Devon	50.55°N 03.62°W	SX8574
Preston (Paignton)	Devon	50.43°N 03.57°W	SX8861
Preston	Dorset	50.64°N 02.42°W	SY7083
Preston (Prestonpans)	East Lothian	55.95°N 02.97°W	NT3974
Preston	East Riding of Yorkshire	53.75°N 00.21°W	TA1830
Preston (Cotswold)	Gloucestershire	51.69°N 01.94°W	SP0400
Preston (Forest of Dean)	Gloucestershire	52.00°N 02.48°W	SO6734
Preston	Hertfordshire	51.90°N 00.30°W	TL1724
Preston (Preston-next-Faversham)	Kent	51.30°N 00.89°E	TR0260
Preston (Preston-next-Wingham)	Kent	51.30°N 01.22°E	TR2561
Preston	Lancashire	53.75°N 02.71°W	SD5329
Preston	North Tyneside	55.01°N 01.46°W	NZ3469
Preston	Rutland	52.60°N 00.71°W	SK8702
Preston	Scottish Borders	55.80°N 02.33°W	NT7957
Preston	Shropshire	52.69°N 02.71°W	SJ5211
Preston (Aldbourne and Ramsbury)	Wiltshire	51.45°N 01.61°W	SU2773
Preston (Lyneham)	Wiltshire	51.50°N 01.95°W	SU0378
Preston / Prestonkirk (East Linton)	East Lothian	55.98°N 02.65°W	NT5977
Preston Bagot	Warwickshire	52.28°N 01.75°W	SP1765
Preston Bissett	Buckinghamshire	51.95°N 01.05°W	SP6529
Preston Bowyer	Somerset	51.02°N 03.24°W	ST1326
Preston Brockhurst	Shropshire	52.81°N 02.69°W	SJ5324
Preston Brook	Cheshire	53.31°N 02.66°W	SJ5680
Preston Candover	Hampshire	51.16°N 01.14°W	SU6041
Preston Capes	Northamptonshire	52.18°N 01.16°W	SP5754
Preston Crowmarsh	Oxfordshire	51.60°N 01.12°W	SU6190
Preston Deanery	Northamptonshire	52.18°N 00.86°W	SP7855
Prestonfield	City of Edinburgh	55.92°N 03.16°W	NT2771
Preston Fields	Warwickshire	52.29°N 01.75°W	SP1766
Preston Grange	North Tyneside	55.02°N 01.46°W	NZ3470
Preston Green	Warwickshire	52.28°N 01.76°W	SP1665
Preston Gubbals	Shropshire	52.76°N 02.75°W	SJ4919
Preston-le-Skerne	Durham	54.61°N 01.53°W	NZ3024
Preston Marsh	Herefordshire	52.11°N 02.64°W	SO5646
Prestonmill	Dumfries and Galloway	54.89°N 03.62°W	NX9657
Preston Montford	Shropshire	52.72°N 02.84°W	SJ4314
Preston on Stour	Warwickshire	52.13°N 01.70°W	SP2049
Preston-on-Tees	Stockton-on-Tees	54.52°N 01.33°W	NZ4315
Preston on the Hill	Cheshire	53.31°N 02.64°W	SJ5780
Preston on Wye	Herefordshire	52.07°N 02.90°W	SO3842
Prestonpans	East Lothian	55.95°N 02.99°W	NT3874
Preston Plucknett	Somerset	50.94°N 02.67°W	ST5316
Preston St Mary	Suffolk	52.11°N 00.83°E	TL9450
Preston-under-Scar	North Yorkshire	54.31°N 01.89°W	SE0791
Preston upon the Weald Moors	Shropshire	52.73°N 02.47°W	SJ6815
Preston Wynne	Herefordshire	52.11°N 02.65°W	SO5546
Prestwich	Bury	53.52°N 02.28°W	SD8103
Prestwick	Northumberland	55.04°N 01.71°W	NZ1872
Prestwick	South Ayrshire	55.49°N 04.62°W	NS3425
Prestwold	Leicestershire	52.78°N 01.15°W	SK5721
Prestwood	Buckinghamshire	51.69°N 00.74°W	SP8700
Prestwood (Kinver)	Staffordshire	52.47°N 02.20°W	SO8686
Prestwood (East Staffordshire)	Staffordshire	52.97°N 01.85°W	SK1042
Prey Heath	Surrey	51.28°N 00.58°W	SU9955
Price Town	Bridgend	51.61°N 03.54°W	SS9392
Prickwillow	Cambridgeshire	52.41°N 00.33°E	TL5982
Priddy	Somerset	51.25°N 02.68°W	ST5251
Pride Park	City of Derby	52.91°N 01.45°W	SK3735
Priestacott	Devon	50.83°N 04.24°W	SS4206
Priestcliffe	Derbyshire	53.24°N 01.80°W	SK1372
Priestcliffe Ditch	Derbyshire	53.23°N 01.80°W	SK1371
Priest Down	Bath and North East Somerset	51.37°N 02.54°W	ST6264
Priestfield	Herefordshire	52.09°N 02.26°W	SO8244
Priestfield	Wolverhampton	52.57°N 02.10°W	SO9397
Priesthill	City of Glasgow	55.81°N 04.36°W	NS5260
Priesthorpe	Leeds	53.81°N 01.69°W	SE2035
Priest Hutton	Lancashire	54.15°N 02.72°W	SD5373
Priest Island	Highland	57.95°N 05.50°W	NB926017
Priestley Green	Calderdale	53.73°N 01.80°W	SE1326
Prieston	Scottish Borders	55.54°N 02.76°W	NT5228
Priestside	Dumfries and Galloway	54.98°N 03.40°W	NY1066
Priestthorpe	Bradford	53.84°N 01.83°W	SE1139
Priest Weston	Shropshire	52.56°N 03.04°W	SO2997
Priestwood	Berkshire	51.41°N 00.76°W	SU8669
Priestwood	Kent	51.35°N 00.36°E	TQ6564
Priestwood Green	Kent	51.35°N 00.36°E	TQ6564
Primethorpe	Leicestershire	52.53°N 01.23°W	SP5293
Primrose	South Tyneside	54.96°N 01.50°W	NZ3263
Primrose Corner	Norfolk	52.66°N 01.42°E	TG3213
Primrose Green	Norfolk	52.70°N 01.04°E	TG0616
Primrose Hill	Bath and North East Somerset	51.39°N 02.38°W	ST7366
Primrose Hill	Camden	51.54°N 00.15°W	TQ2884
Primrose Hill	Dudley	52.48°N 02.08°W	SO9487
Primrose Hill	Lancashire	53.57°N 02.93°W	SD3809
Primrose Valley	North Yorkshire	54.18°N 00.30°W	TA1178
Primsland	Worcestershire	52.24°N 02.14°W	SO9061
Prince Hill	Cheshire	52.99°N 02.43°W	SJ7144
Princeland	Perth and Kinross	56.54°N 03.28°W	NO2140
Prince Royd	Kirklees	53.65°N 01.81°W	SE1218
Princes End	Sandwell	52.53°N 02.07°W	SO9593
Princes Gate	Pembrokeshire	51.77°N 04.71°W	SN1312
Prince's Marsh	Hampshire	51.02°N 00.90°W	SU7726
Princes Park	Liverpool	53.38°N 02.96°W	SJ3688
Princes Risborough	Buckinghamshire	51.72°N 00.84°W	SP8003
Princethorpe	Warwickshire	52.32°N 01.41°W	SP4070
Princetown	Caerphilly	51.77°N 03.29°W	SO1109
Princetown	Devon	50.53°N 04.00°W	SX5873
Prinsted	West Sussex	50.83°N 00.92°W	SU7605
Printstile	Kent	51.16°N 00.21°E	TQ5543
Prion	Denbighshire	53.14°N 03.42°W	SJ0562
Prior Park	Northumberland	55.75°N 02.01°W	NT9951
Prior Rigg	Cumbria	55.00°N 02.84°W	NY4668
Prior's Frome	Herefordshire	52.04°N 02.62°W	SO5739
Priors Halton	Shropshire	52.37°N 02.75°W	SO4975
Priors Hardwick	Warwickshire	52.19°N 01.31°W	SP4755
Priorslee	Shropshire	52.68°N 02.43°W	SJ7110
Priors Marston	Warwickshire	52.20°N 01.28°W	SP4957
Prior's Norton	Gloucestershire	51.91°N 02.20°W	SO8624
Priors Park	Gloucestershire	51.97°N 02.16°W	SO8931
Priorswood	Somerset	51.02°N 03.09°W	ST2326
Priory	Pembrokeshire	51.72°N 05.04°W	SM9007
Priory Green	Suffolk	52.05°N 00.81°E	TL9343
Priory Heath	Suffolk	52.03°N 01.19°E	TM1942
Priory Wood	Herefordshire	52.09°N 03.09°W	SO2545
Prisk	The Vale Of Glamorgan	51.47°N 03.42°W	ST0176
Pristacott	Devon	51.01°N 04.08°W	SS5426
Priston	Bath and North East Somerset	51.33°N 02.44°W	ST6960
Pristow Green	Norfolk	52.45°N 01.13°E	TM1389
Prittlewell	Essex	51.55°N 00.69°E	TQ8787
Privett (East Hampshire)	Hampshire	51.02°N 01.04°W	SU6726
Privett (Gosport)	Hampshire	50.78°N 01.16°W	SZ5999
Prixford	Devon	51.10°N 04.08°W	SS5436
Probus	Cornwall	50.28°N 04.96°W	SW8947
Prospect	Cumbria	54.74°N 03.38°W	NY1140
Prospect Village	Staffordshire	52.69°N 01.95°W	SK0311
Prospidnick	Cornwall	50.13°N 05.30°W	SW6431
Provanmill	City of Glasgow	55.87°N 04.19°W	NS6367
Prowse	Devon	50.83°N 03.64°W	SS8405
Prudhoe	Northumberland	54.95°N 01.86°W	NZ0962
Prussia Cove	Cornwall	50.09°N 05.42°W	SW5527

== Pu ==
Location	Locality	Coordinates (links to map & photo sources)	OS grid reference
Publow	Bath and North East Somerset	51.37°N 02.54°W	ST6264
Puckeridge	Hertfordshire	51.88°N -00.00°E	TL3823
Puckington	Somerset	50.95°N 02.89°W	ST3718
Pucklechurch	South Gloucestershire	51.48°N 02.44°W	ST6976
Pucknall	Hampshire	51.01°N 01.45°W	SU3824
Puckrup	Gloucestershire	52.02°N 02.17°W	SO8836
Puckshole	Gloucestershire	51.74°N 02.24°W	SO8305
Puddaven	Devon	50.43°N 03.71°W	SX7861
Puddinglake	Cheshire	53.21°N 02.42°W	SJ7269
Pudding Pie Nook	Lancashire	53.80°N 02.70°W	SD5435
Puddington	Cheshire	53.25°N 03.02°W	SJ3273
Puddington	Devon	50.87°N 03.66°W	SS8310
Puddle	Cornwall	50.39°N 04.71°W	SX0758
Puddlebridge	Somerset	50.92°N 02.96°W	ST3214
Puddledock (Westerham)	Kent	51.23°N 00.08°E	TQ4650
Puddledock (Wilmington)	Kent	51.40°N 00.16°E	TQ5170
Puddledock	Norfolk	52.48°N 01.01°E	TM0592
Puddletown	Dorset	50.74°N 02.35°W	SY7594
Pudleigh	Somerset	50.88°N 02.98°W	ST3110
Pudleston	Herefordshire	52.22°N 02.64°W	SO5659
Pudsey	Calderdale	53.73°N 02.15°W	SD9026
Pudsey	Leeds	53.79°N 01.66°W	SE2233
Puffin Island	Isle of Anglesey	53.32°N 04.02°W	SH650823
Pulborough	West Sussex	50.95°N 00.50°W	TQ0518
Pule Hill	Calderdale	53.73°N 01.86°W	SE0927
Puleston	Shropshire	52.79°N 02.40°W	SJ7322
Pulford	Cheshire	53.11°N 02.94°W	SJ3758
Pulham	Dorset	50.87°N 02.42°W	ST7008
Pulham Market	Norfolk	52.42°N 01.22°E	TM1986
Pulham St Mary	Norfolk	52.41°N 01.23°E	TM2085
Pullens Green	South Gloucestershire	51.62°N 02.56°W	ST6192
Pulley	Shropshire	52.67°N 02.77°W	SJ4809
Pullington	Kent	51.05°N 00.58°E	TQ8132
Pulloxhill	Bedfordshire	51.98°N 00.45°W	TL0633
Pulpit Hill	Argyll and Bute	56.40°N 05.48°W	NM8529
Pulrose	Isle of Man	54.14°N 04.51°W	SC3675
Pulsford	Devon	50.49°N 03.69°W	SX8068
Pulverbatch	Shropshire	52.61°N 02.85°W	SJ4202
Pumpherston	West Lothian	55.90°N 03.50°W	NT0669
Pumsaint	Carmarthenshire	52.04°N 03.96°W	SN6540
Puncheston	Pembrokeshire	51.92°N 04.91°W	SN0029
Puncknowle	Dorset	50.68°N 02.66°W	SY5388
Punnett's Town	East Sussex	50.95982°N 0.31326°E	TQ6220
Purbrook	Hampshire	50.85°N 01.04°W	SU6707
Purewell	Bournemouth	50.72°N 01.77°W	SZ1692
Purfleet	Essex	51.47°N 00.23°E	TQ5577
Puriton	Somerset	51.16°N 02.97°W	ST3241
Purleigh	Essex	51.68°N 00.64°E	TL8302
Purley	Croydon	51.33°N 00.12°W	TQ3161
Purley on Thames	Berkshire	51.47°N 01.05°W	SU6675
Purlogue	Shropshire	52.37°N 03.05°W	SO2876
Purlpit	Wiltshire	51.38°N 02.18°W	ST8765
Purls Bridge	Cambridgeshire	52.46°N 00.16°E	TL4787
Purn	North Somerset	51.30°N 02.96°W	ST3357
Purse Caundle	Dorset	50.95°N 02.44°W	ST6917
Purslow	Shropshire	52.41°N 02.94°W	SO3680
Purston Jaglin	Wakefield	53.66°N 01.35°W	SE4319
Purtington	Somerset	50.87°N 02.86°W	ST3909
Purton	Berkshire	51.49°N 01.30°W	SU4877
Purton (Lydney)	Gloucestershire	51.73°N 02.47°W	SO6704
Purton (Berkeley)	Gloucestershire	51.73°N 02.45°W	SO6904
Purton	Wiltshire	51.58°N 01.87°W	SU0987
Purton Common	Wiltshire	51.59°N 01.88°W	SU0888
Purton Stoke	Wiltshire	51.60°N 01.87°W	SU0990
Purwell	Hertfordshire	51.94°N 00.25°W	TL2029
Pury End	Northamptonshire	52.09°N 00.97°W	SP7045
Pusey	Oxfordshire	51.66°N 01.49°W	SU3596
Putley	Herefordshire	52.03°N 02.52°W	SO6437
Putley Common	Herefordshire	52.03°N 02.54°W	SO6338
Putley Green	Herefordshire	52.03°N 02.51°W	SO6537
Putloe	Gloucestershire	51.77°N 02.32°W	SO7809
Putney	Wandsworth	51.46°N 00.23°W	TQ2375
Putney Heath	Wandsworth	51.44°N 00.23°W	TQ2373
Putney Vale	Wandsworth	51.43°N 00.24°W	TQ2272
Putnoe	Bedfordshire	52.14°N 00.45°W	TL0651
Putsborough	Devon	51.13°N 04.23°W	SS4440
Putson	Herefordshire	52.03°N 02.71°W	SO5138
Puttenham	Hertfordshire	51.81°N 00.72°W	SP8814
Puttenham	Surrey	51.21°N 00.66°W	SU9347
Puttock End	Essex	52.02°N 00.62°E	TL8040
Puttock's End	Essex	51.84°N 00.26°E	TL5619
Putton	Dorset	50.61°N 02.49°W	SY6580
Puxey	Dorset	50.90°N 02.34°W	ST7612
Puxley	Northamptonshire	52.06°N 00.90°W	SP7541
Puxton	North Somerset	51.36°N 02.86°W	ST4063

== Pw ==
Location	Locality	Coordinates (links to map & photo sources)	OS grid reference
Pwll	Carmarthenshire	51.68°N 04.20°W	SN4801
Pwll	Powys	52.62°N 03.19°W	SJ1904
Pwll-clai	Flintshire	53.24°N 03.23°W	SJ1873
Pwllcrochan	Pembrokeshire	51.67°N 05.01°W	SM9202
Pwllglas / Pwll-glâs	Denbighshire	53.07°N 03.33°W	SJ1154
Pwllgloyw	Powys	51.98°N 03.41°W	SO0333
Pwllheli	Gwynedd	52.88°N 04.42°W	SH3735
Pwll-Mawr	Cardiff	51.49°N 03.12°W	ST2278
Pwll-melyn	Flintshire	53.23°N 03.22°W	SJ1871
Pwllmeyric	Monmouthshire	51.62°N 02.70°W	ST5192
Pwll-trap	Carmarthenshire	51.81°N 04.52°W	SN2616
Pwll-y-glaw	Neath Port Talbot	51.62°N 03.74°W	SS7993
Pwllypant	Caerphilly	51.58°N 03.22°W	ST1588

== Py ==
Location	Locality	Coordinates (links to map & photo sources)	OS grid reference
Pye Bridge	Derbyshire	53.06°N 01.35°W	SK4352
Pyecombe	West Sussex	50.89°N 00.16°W	TQ2912
Pye Corner	Devon	50.77°N 03.54°W	SX9198
Pye Corner	Kent	51.20°N 00.64°E	TQ8548
Pye Corner (High Cross)	City of Newport	51.57°N 03.04°W	ST2887
Pye Corner (Nash)	City of Newport	51.56°N 02.95°W	ST3485
Pye Corner	South Gloucestershire	51.50°N 02.52°W	ST6479
Pye Green	Staffordshire	52.72°N 02.01°W	SJ9914
Pye Hill	Nottinghamshire	53.06°N 01.34°W	SK4452
Pyewipe	North East Lincolnshire	53.58°N 00.12°W	TA2411
Pyle	Bridgend	51.52°N 03.70°W	SS8282
Pyle	Isle of Wight	50.60°N 01.33°W	SZ4779
Pyle	Swansea	51.57°N 04.05°W	SS5888
Pylehill	Hampshire	50.96°N 01.30°W	SU4919
Pyle Hill	Surrey	51.28°N 00.58°W	SU9955
Pyleigh	Somerset	51.06°N 03.25°W	ST1230
Pylle	Somerset	51.14°N 02.57°W	ST6038
Pymoor (or Pymore)	Cambridgeshire	52.45°N 00.19°E	TL4986
Pymore (or Pymoor)	Cambridgeshire	52.45°N 00.19°E	TL4986
Pymore	Dorset	50.74°N 02.76°W	SY4694
Pype Hayes	Birmingham	52.52°N 01.82°W	SP1292
Pyrford	Surrey	51.32°N 00.52°W	TQ0359
Pyrford Green	Surrey	51.31°N 00.50°W	TQ0458
Pyrford Village	Surrey	51.31°N 00.50°W	TQ0458
Pyrland	Somerset	51.02°N 03.09°W	ST2326
Pyrton	Oxfordshire	51.64°N 01.01°W	SU6895
Pytchley	Northamptonshire	52.35°N 00.75°W	SP8574
Pyworthy	Devon	50.79°N 04.39°W	SS3102
