= Prendergast =

Prendergast may refer to:

- Prendergast (surname), including a list of people with the name
- Prendergast, Pembrokeshire, a suburb of Haverfordwest, Pembrokeshire, Wales
- Prendergast (Solva, Haverfordwest), a location in Wales
- Prendergast School, Lewisham, London, UK

== Other uses ==
- Archbishop Prendergast High School, a former school in Philadelphia, U.S
