= Tom Prendergast =

Tom Prendergast may refer to:

- Tom Prendergast (Laois footballer), played 1976–87
- Tom Prendergast (Kerry footballer), played 1966–73

== See also ==
- Thomas Prendergast (disambiguation)
