= Pendergast =

Pendergast (Irish: de Piondárgas, Piondárgas) is a Norman-Irish surname derived from Prendergast. Notable people with the surname include:

- Aloysius Pendergast, character in novels by Douglas Preston and Lincoln Child
- Anna Pendergast (born 1961), Canadian basketball player
- Bill Pendergast (1915–2001), Welsh footballer
- Charlie Pendergast (1899–1972), Australian rugby league footballer
- Clancy Pendergast (born 1967), American football coach
- David M. Pendergast (born 1934), American archaeologist
- James Pendergast (1856–1911), American politician from Kansas City, Missouri; brother of Tom Pendergast
- James F. Prendergast (1917–1985), American politician from Pennsylvania
- Jane Pendergast, American biostatistician
- Kevin Pendergast, American football and soccer player
- Leeanna Pendergast (born 1962), Canadian politician from Ontario
- Oaklee Pendergast (born 2004), English actor
- Tim Pendergast (born 1958), American college football coach
- Tom Pendergast (1872–1945), American political boss from Kansas City, Missouri; brother of James Pendergast
- Tom Pendergast (footballer) (1870–1946), English footballer
- Victoria Pendergast (born 1991), Australian Paralympian
