= Pendergrass =

Pendergrass may refer to:

== Places ==
- Pendergrass, Georgia, a city in Georgia, United States

== Surname ==
- Moses Pendergrass, subject of a footnote in a Mark Twain article
- Shane E. Pendergrass (born 1950), American politician
- Teddy Pendergrass (1950–2010), American singer

== See also ==
- Prendergast (surname)
