= Pudsey (disambiguation) =

Pudsey is a town between Leeds and Bradford, in West Yorkshire, England

Pudsey may also refer to:

- Pudsey (UK Parliament constituency) (1885–1918 and 1950–2024)
- Pudsey (ward), an electoral ward of the Leeds City Council
- Pudsey, Calderdale a hamlet near Todmorden, West Yorkshire, England
- Bishop Pudsey (1125-1195), Bishop of Durham
- Richard Pudsey (fl. 1492), English politician
- Pudsey Bear, mascot of the British TV programme, Children in Need
- Pudsey, the dog in the Ashleigh and Pudsey act, winners of 2012 Britain's Got Talent
  - Pudsey the Dog: The Movie, a 2014 British 3D live action family comedy film
