= Pymore =

Pymore may refer to two places in England:

- Pymoor, Cambridgeshire, a village sometimes called Pymore
- Pymore, Dorset, a village
