= Puddle (disambiguation) =

A puddle is a small accumulation of liquid on a surface.

Puddle or Puddles may also refer to:

- Puddle, Cornwall, hamlet in England
- Puddle (video game)
- Puddle (M. C. Escher), a woodcut by M. C. Escher
- Weld puddle, a crucial part of the welding process
- In rowing, an oval patch of disturbed water indicative of rowing skill
- Puddle clay, a type of waterproof cement
- Puddle of Mudd, an American post-grunge band
- The Puddle, a New Zealand music group
- Puddles the Clown, the stage name of Mike Geier, and the associated band Puddles Pity Party
- Puddling (agriculture), wet tillage of rice paddies to prepare them for rice planting
- Puddling (behavior), the process by which butterflies extract nutrients from damp surfaces
- Puddling (civil engineering), a method for producing waterproof puddle or lining an existing area with puddle clay
- Puddling (metallurgy), an obsolete method for purifying pig iron
- Puddling furnace, a metalmaking technology to create wrought iron from the pig iron produced in a blast furnace
