= Prestwood (disambiguation) =

Prestwood is a village in Buckinghamshire, England.

Prestwood may also refer to:

- Prestwood, East Staffordshire, Staffordshire, England
- Prestwood, Kinver, a hamlet in Kinver in South Staffordshire, England
- Hugh Prestwood (born 1942), American songwriter
- Max Prestwood, American racing driver
- Thomas Prestwood (c. 1570–1655), English politician
- Thomas Prestwood (died 1558), English politician
- Viscount Prestwood, title of Clement Attlee
