= John Prendergast =

John Prendergast may refer to:

- John Prendergast (priest) (fl. 1583–1610), Dean of Lismore and prebendary of Cashel
- John Patrick Prendergast (1808–1893), Irish historian
- John Prendergast (artist) (1815–?), British born painter
- John Prendergast (British Army officer) (1910–2008), British army officer
- John Robert Prendergast (1930/31–2016), Canadian football player
- John Barry Prendergast (1933–2011), better known as John Barry (composer), composer of film soundtracks, including many James Bond films
- John Prendergast (activist) (born 1963), American human rights activist
