= Actions in Nordland =

- Part of the Norwegian campaign of World War II
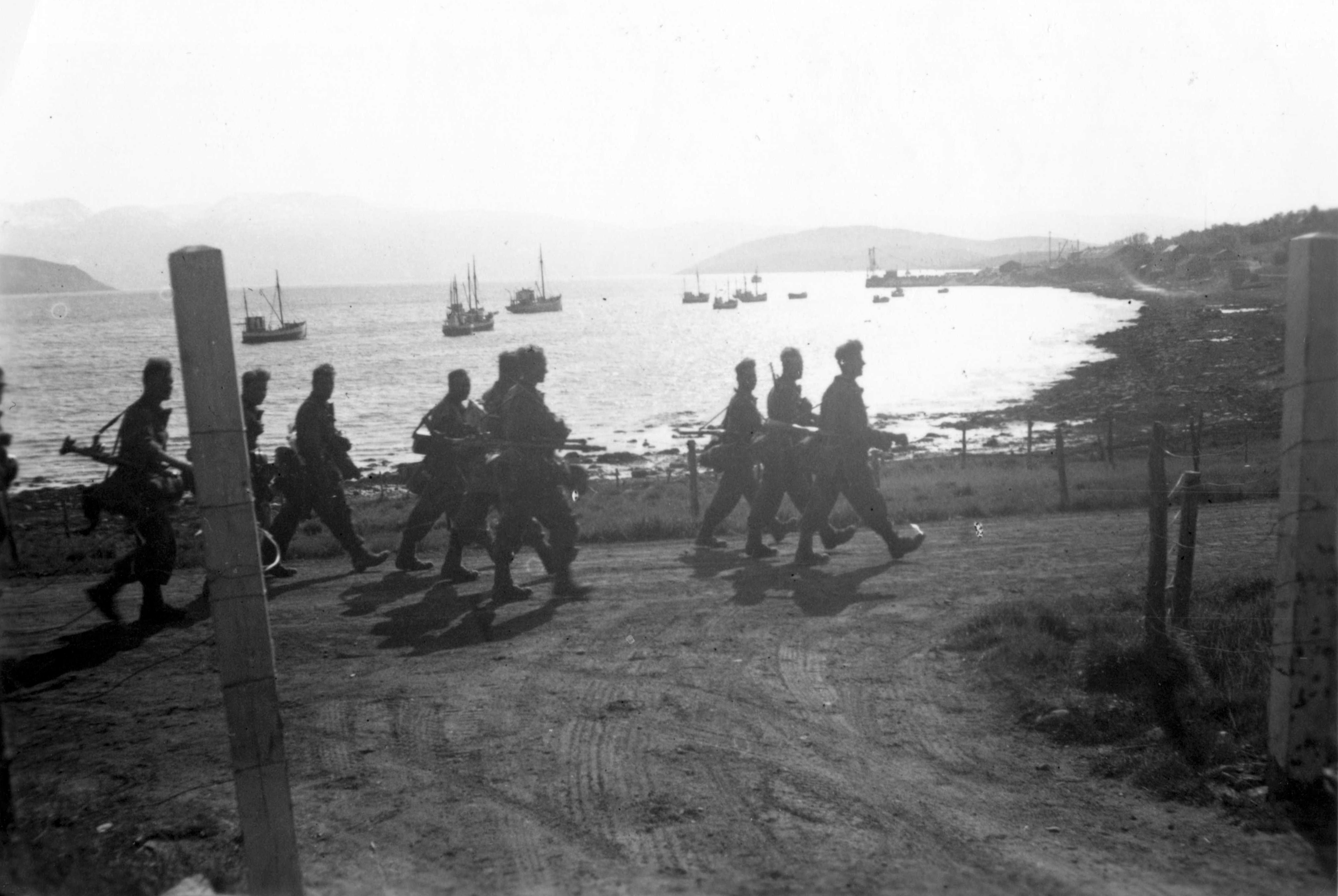
- German Gebirgsjäger (mountain troops) occupy Fauske near Bodø as the Allies evacuate the region
Date	8 May – 1 June 1940
Location	Nordland county, northern Norway
Result	German victory

Belligerents
Germany	United Kingdom; Norway

Commanders and leaders
Valentin Feurstein	William Fraser; Colin Gubbins

Strength
4,000	2,500

Casualties and losses
	500

The Actions in Nordland were part of the 1940 Norwegian Campaign of World War II. They were a subsidiary part of the Allied attempt to recapture Narvik.

When the Germans achieved victory in the Campaigns in Central Norway, they began advancing north through Nordland to relieve the German forces isolated in Narvik. To prevent the Germans either relieving Narvik or capturing airfields within easy range, some small British and French units were deployed to the southern part of Nordland county early in May to reinforce retreating Norwegian units. A more powerful force (mainly British, but with some Norwegian units) was detached from the expeditionary force besieging Narvik to northern and central Nordland in the middle of May. This force's arrival was disrupted by German air attacks on the ships carrying its units.

German mountain troops forced the Allies back to within a few miles of their base at Bodø. The Allies had already decided to evacuate Norway at this point, and the force at Bodø was withdrawn without incident, with the last units departing by 1 June 1940.

== Background ==
Nordland within Norway

When the Germans launched Operation Weserübung, an invasion of Denmark and Norway on 9 April 1940, one of their principal objectives was the port of Narvik in Northern Norway, through which iron ore was exported to Germany during the winter months. Part of the German 3rd Mountain Division commanded by Generalleutnant Eduard Dietl occupied the port, but were isolated when the destroyers and ships which had transported them and much of their supplies were destroyed in the First and Second naval battles of Narvik.

The recovery of Narvik became one of the principal Allied objectives. Partly because of disagreements between the naval commander (Admiral of the Fleet Lord Cork) and the designated land commander (Major General Pierse Joseph Mackesy), the Allies did not make a direct frontal assault on Narvik. Instead, they established a base at Harstad on Hinnøya island on 14 April, and began encircling the German position.

Between 14 April and 2 May, Allied forces which had landed at Åndalsnes and Namsos in Central Norway were forced to evacuate. The Norwegian forces in Central Norway either capitulated or were disbanded by 5 May and the Germans were free to advance north to relieve Dietl's force.

== Allied decisions ==
Actions in Nordland (Nordland)

As the force at Namsos was evacuated, Lieutenant General Hugh Massy, the commander of the British forces in Central Norway, recommended that a detachment of French ski troops defend Grong, to block the road and the uncompleted railway line (the Nordland Line) running north from Namsos to Mosjøen. The commanders of the forces at Namsos objected, claiming that these routes were impassable even though Norwegian units had been moving easily between Grong and Mosjøen. (The leading German mountain troops later covered the 125 miles (201 km) from Grong to Mosjøen, on foot, against opposition, in only five days.)

However, the commanders at Narvik were anxious about the area around Bodø, where an airstrip was being constructed. They were concerned that even if German land forces did not link up with the Germans besieged at Narvik, the Allied position there could be made untenable if the Germans built or seized air bases within range. As early as 29 April, a company of 1st Battalion the Scots Guards was dispatched from Harstad to Bodø, while the French ski detachment and two British light anti-aircraft guns were transported by sea from Namsos to Mosjøen, arriving on 2 May aboard the transport Ulster Prince escorted by the destroyer HMS Veteran.

When the Germans had attacked Norway, MI(R), a branch of the War Office in Britain which specialised in irregular warfare, had formed ten Independent Companies for raiding purposes, organised by Lieutenant Colonel Colin Gubbins. Even though official authorisation to form these units was issued only on 20 April, the first of them sailed for Norway on 27 April. On 2 May, Gubbins was ordered to form four of these companies into "Scissorsforce" and secure Bodø, Mo i Rana and Mosjøen.

This area of Norway was mountainous and sparsely populated. There was very little cover against air attack, nor could much use be made of night for cover given the long daylight hours in late spring and summer in the high latitudes.

== Mosjøen ==
The Germans began advancing north from Grong on 5 May. To oppose them were a Norwegian battalion (numbering about 400), which was falling back to Mosjøen while carrying out ineffective demolitions, and another weak Norwegian reserve battalion. Nos. 4 and 5 Independent Companies landed at Mosjøen on the night of 8/9 May, replacing the small French detachment. No. 1 Independent Company meanwhile secured Mo i Rana and No. 3 Independent Company went to Bodø.

On 9 May, the Germans drove the Norwegian defenders from Fellingfors, 25 miles (40 km) south of Mosjøen. No. 5 Independent Company and two Norwegian companies occupied a position 10 miles (16 km) from Mosjøen, where the road from the south ran between the Bjørnaa river and steep hillsides. Early in the morning of 10 May, the leading German troops (from the 181st Infantry Division) advanced incautiously by bicycle up the road and were ambushed and destroyed by a platoon commanded by Captain John Prendergast, one of eight Indian Army officers attached to the Independent Companies, losing some fifty casualties.

Later in the morning, the German main body drove the British and Norwegians from this position, while Austrian ski troops outflanked the defenders. Gubbins, who was present, agreed with the Norwegian commander that there was no other suitable defensive position closer to Mosjøen. The two Independent Companies and the British light anti-aircraft detachment (which had to abandon its anti-aircraft guns) were evacuated in the early hours of 11 May aboard the Norwegian steamer Erling Jarl, which Gubbins had chartered for 5000 krone, escorted by two destroyers. The Norwegians withdrew up the road to the north.

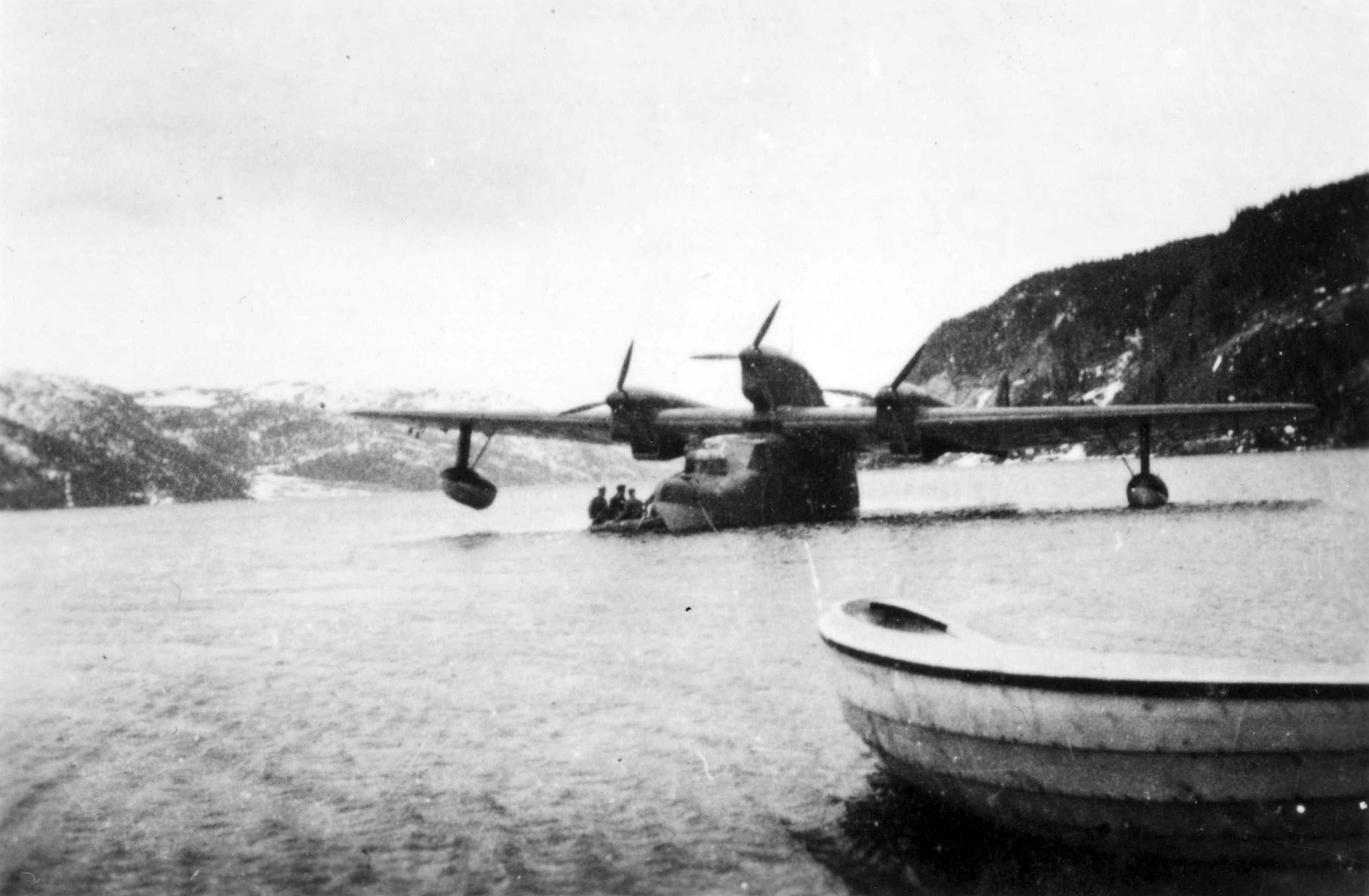
Reinforcements land from a German flying boat, Hemnfjorden 13–14 May 1940

However, on 10 May, in a daring move, the Germans had commandeered a coaster, Nordnorge, manned it with a crew detached from German destroyers and embarked 300 infantry from the 138th Mountain Regiment and two mountain guns. Nordnorge sailed from Trondheimsfjord and entered the Ranfjord, at the end of which lay Mo i Rana. The Germans landed at Hemnesberget about halfway along the fjord. Two Dornier seaplanes also landed 40 infantry and mortars. A platoon of No. 1 Independent Company and some Norwegian reservists were outnumbered and forced to escape by boat after a stiff resistance.

Two British warships, the anti-aircraft cruiser HMS Calcutta and the destroyer HMS Zulu, had tried too late to intercept Nordnorge. They sank Nordnorge about an hour and a half after the Germans disembarked, but then had to leave the fjord. A shuttle of seaplanes reinforced and resupplied the Germans at Hemnesberget. Counter-attacks the next day by No. 1 Independent Company and Norwegian troops failed to dislodge them.

The Norwegian troops withdrawing from Mosjøen had intended to proceed by a ferry which normally docked at Hemnesberget. They had to proceed by road instead and were forced to abandon much of their equipment.

== Deployment of 24th Guards Brigade ==
Alarmed by Gubbins's first reports, on 9 May Major General Mackesy had ordered that the entire British component of the Allied force attacking Narvik (24th Guards Brigade plus some supporting arms detachments), was to be diverted to the south to defend Bodø and Mo i Rana. Gubbins's force was attached to the brigade. 1st Battalion, the Scots Guards, commanded by Lieutenant Colonel Thomas Byrnand Trappes-Lomax, took over the defence of Mo i Rana.

It had originally been intended to deploy 1st Battalion, the Irish Guards and the Brigade HQ to Mo i Rana also, but the brigade's commander, Brigadier William Fraser, was uneasy about the position. Mo i Rana lay at the end of the long and narrow Ranfjord, with the Germans occupying Hemnesberget, and ships using it to supply the forces at Mo i Rana would be very vulnerable to air attack. The only alternative line of communication, the road from Mo i Rana to Rognan on the south side of Skjerstad Fjord, was believed incorrectly to be snowbound for several miles. The Irish Guards and the Brigade HQ were ordered to Bodø instead.

Several setbacks and disasters at sea hampered the deployment of 24th Guards Brigade. On 14 May, Brigadier Fraser embarked aboard the destroyer HMS Somali to proceed to Mo i Rana to brief Trappes-Lomax on the new situation. Somali was attacked by German bombers and so badly damaged that it had to proceed directly to Scapa Flow for emergency repairs, carrying the brigadier with it. Gubbins, with the acting rank of Colonel, was the next senior officer in the force and assumed command. (Note: On a previous occasion, when Brigadier Fraser had been wounded, Lieutenant Colonel Trappes-Lomax had assumed temporary command of the brigade.)

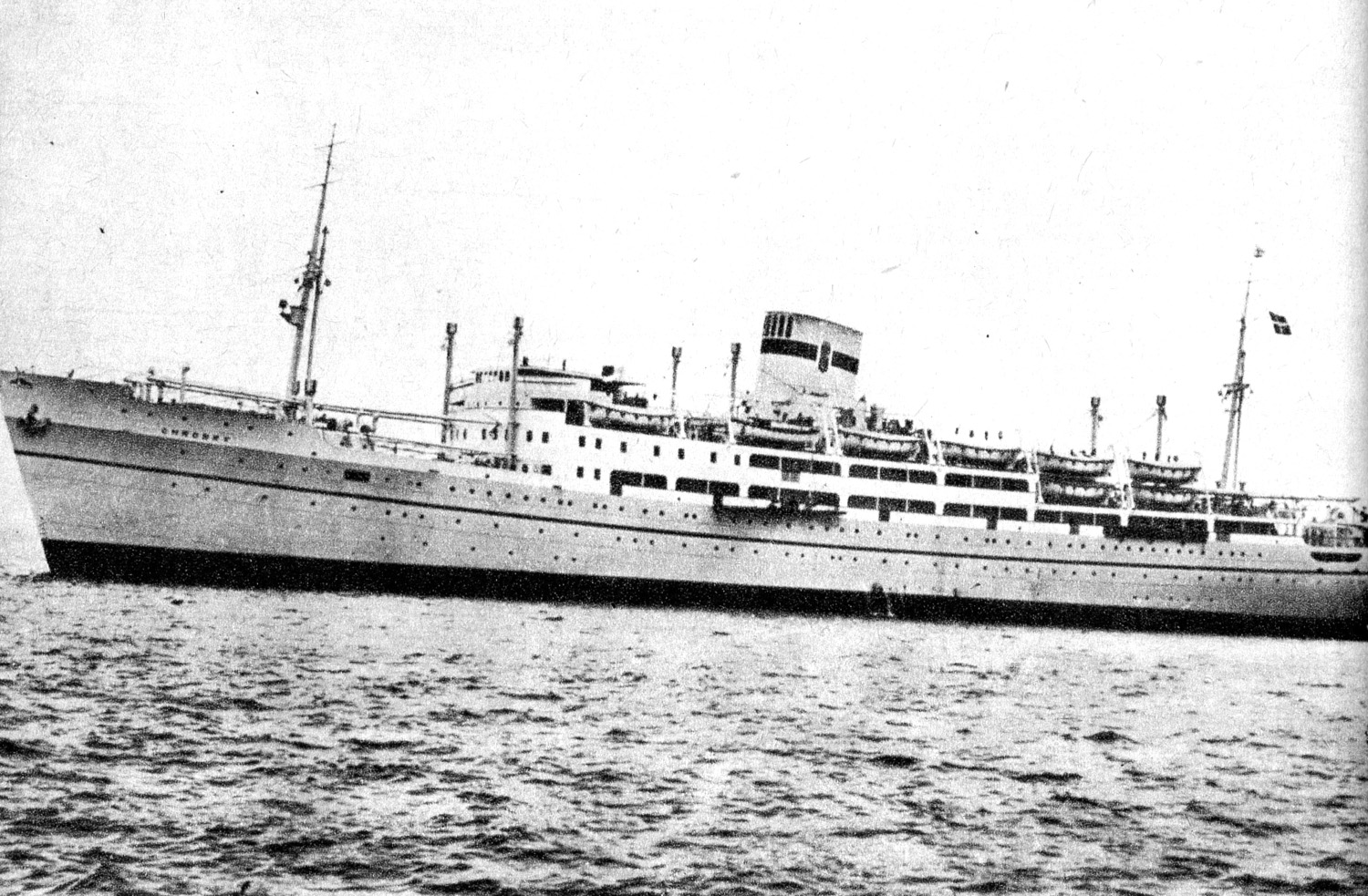
MS Chrobry

On 15 May, the Polish troopship Chrobry, with the Irish Guards and Brigade HQ embarked, was attacked by German bombers off the southern Lofoten Islands. Bombs exploding amidships killed all the senior officers of the Irish Guards and set the ship ablaze. The destroyer HMS Wolverine and the sloop HMS Stork rescued over 700 survivors. The stoic behaviour of the Irish Guards, mustered on the foredeck of the blazing liner, was compared by the captain of Wolverine to the Birkenhead drill. The Irish Guards were sent back to Harstad to be reformed and re-equipped before setting out for Bodø again. Also lost aboard Chrobry were three light tanks of the 3rd The King's Own Hussars, the only British tanks in Norway.

On 17 May, the cruiser HMS Effingham, carrying some of the personnel and most of the equipment of the 2nd Battalion, the South Wales Borderers, struck a rock about 12 miles (19 km) from Bodø. To avoid air attack, the cruiser had been taking an unusual route and had been proceeding at 23 knots. The South Wales Borderers were evacuated from the Effingham by the destroyer HMS Echo and transferred to the anti-aircraft cruiser HMS Coventry. They too had to return to Harstad to be re-equipped. No.2 Independent Company, which had recently arrived at Bodø, later salvaged four Bren Carriers and other equipment from the wreck of Effingam, which was finally dispatched by a torpedo on 21 May.

== Mo i Rana ==
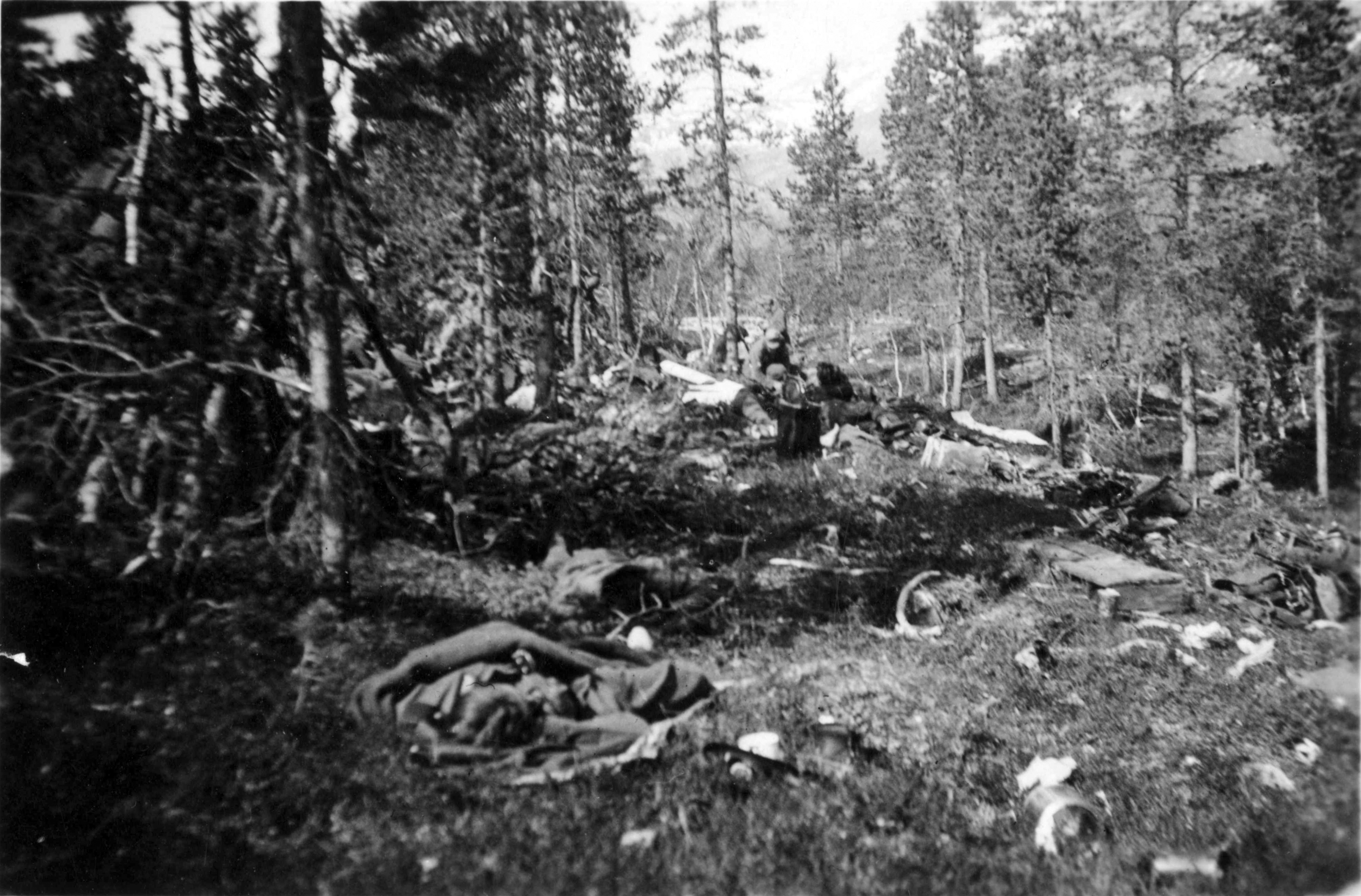
Equipment abandoned by British soldiers, Stien, Mo i Rana, 17 May 1940

The German attack against the Allied positions at Stien, about 3 miles (4.8 km) west of Mo i Rana, began on 17 May. The German force around Mosjøen was composed of five battalions and three "troops" of mountain artillery from the 2nd Mountain Division, commanded by Generalleutnant Valentin Feurstein. The defending force was "Trappescol", made up of the 1st Scots Guards (less C Company at Bodø), No.1 Independent Company, a troop of 203 Battery, 51st Field Regiment Royal Artillery with four 25-pounder guns, a troop of Bofors 40 mm guns of the 55th Light Anti-Aircraft Regiment RA, with other small detachments, and a Norwegian contingent. The German frontal attack by the 2nd battalion of the 137th Mountain Regiment along the road alongside the Ranfjord was halted, but a German outflanking force which had commandeered skis from local farms as they advanced fought its way down the Dalselva River, using "Schmeisser" machine-pistols effectively, and forced the defenders to withdraw. Other German ski troops, thought at the time to be paratroops dropped on a bare hillside, attacked the Scots Guards' transport near Mo i Rana to threaten Trappes-Lomax's rear.

On 18 May, Gubbins arrived, bringing orders from Lieutenant General Claude Auchinleck, the recently appointed commander of the North Western Expeditionary Force, that Mo i Rana was to be firmly defended. Trappes-Lomax however insisted that the position was untenable. Since no reinforcements were available, Gubbins reluctantly concurred. "Trappescol" withdrew "precipitately" in Gubbins's words, abandoning most stores and equipment intact. B Company of the Scots Guards and No. 1 Independent Company were left behind but succeeded in rejoining the force the next day. (B Company had been guided by an unofficially attached Swedish officer, Captain Count Erik Lewenhaupt.)

On 20 May, Gubbins and Auchinleck were dismayed to find that Trappes-Lomax had continued to retreat despite having broken contact with the Germans, and was proposing to fall back across the "snow belt" north of his new position at the village of Krokstrand. Gubbins was also alarmed by the large numbers of stragglers he found north of the "snow belt", including the troop of 203 Battery RA, who had lost their communications equipment at Mo i Rana. He ordered No. 1 Independent Company to set up a control point at the ferry terminus at Rognan. He then gave Trappes-Lomax orders that there was to be no further retreat without authorisation.

== Pothus ==
From the northern edge of the "snow belt", the road to Rognan followed the narrow valley of the Saltdal River. As reinforcements landed at Bodø and were moved forward by any improvised means available, Gubbins intended to man a defensive position at Storjord, 20 miles (32 km) south of Rognan. However, late on 22 May, Gubbins was informed that Trappes-Lomax was pulling back across the "snow belt" that night, and had retained some requisitioned buses to do so. No. 3 Independent Company, who were to have used these to move forward to reinforce the Scots Guards, had to march instead and arrived late and tired. Trappes-Lomax's withdrawal had made it impossible for the Storjord position to be prepared or manned in time.

The Scots Guards occupied a rearguard position north of the Viskisnoia River on 23 May. Gubbins relieved Trappes-Lomax of command in the afternoon. The Germans occupied a hill which No.3 Independent Company had arrived too late to defend and which dominated the west flank of the position, and Gubbins ordered the exhausted Scots Guards to be withdrawn to Bodø.

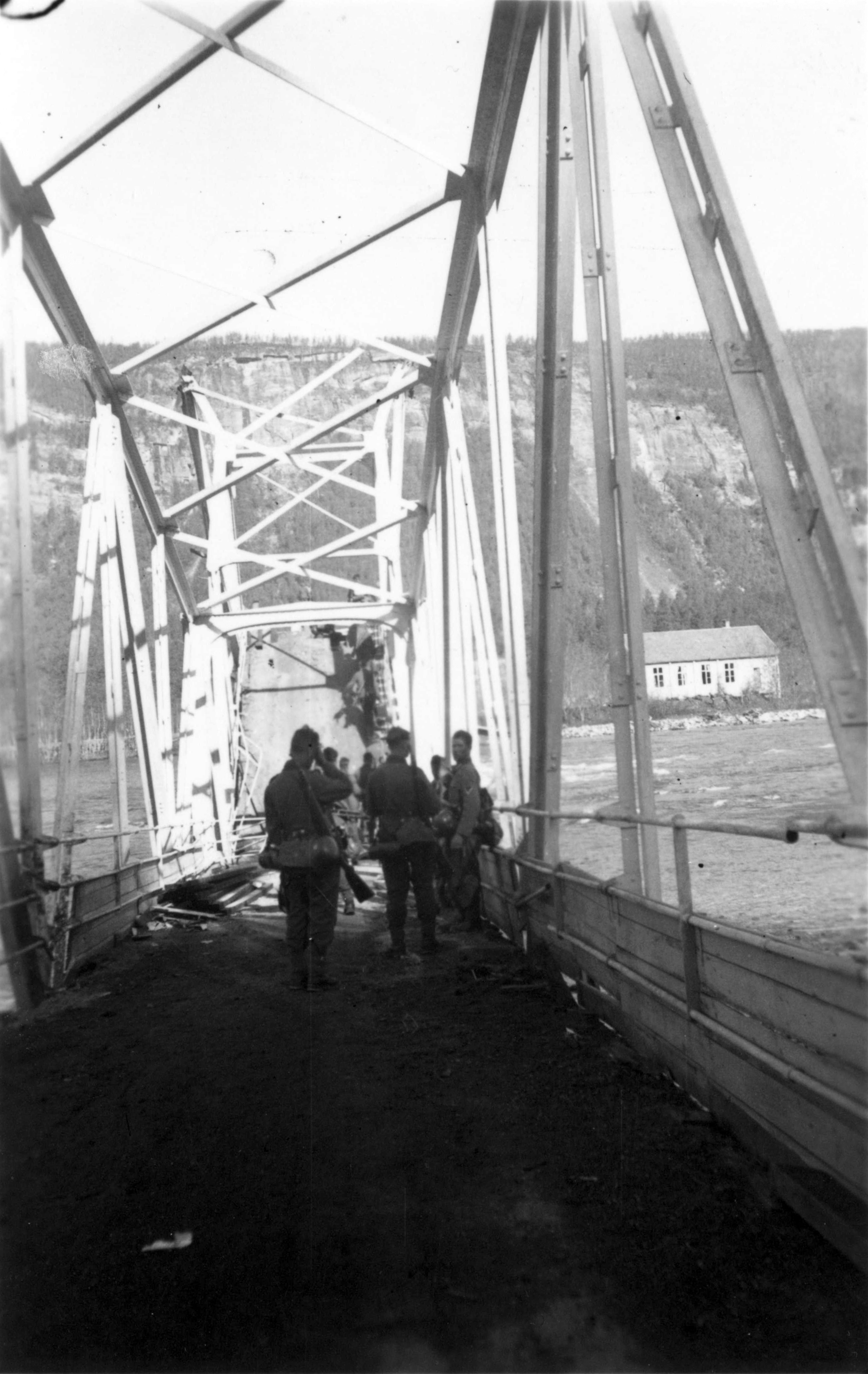
German soldiers on the partly demolished Pothus bridge

Unable to hold Storjord, Gubbins instead proposed to establish a final position running east from Finneid on the north side of Skjerstad Fjord, some 42 miles (68 km) east of Bodø, via a chain of lakes which formed a natural defensive line, to the Blaamannsis glacier. To allow time for all units of the brigade to arrive and prepare this position, he ordered Lieutenant Colonel Hugh Stockwell (promoted from command of No. 2 Independent Company) to occupy a delaying position at Pothus 10 miles (16 km) south of Rognan where the Saltdal valley widened. Stockwell's force consisted of 1st Battalion, the Irish Guards (whose senior officer after the Chrobry disaster on 15 May was a Captain), Nos. 2 and 3 Independent Companies, the troop of 203 Battery RA firing their 25-pounders over open sights and a Norwegian machine-gun company reinforced by two mortars and some patrol troops. They occupied positions on both sides of the Saltdal, covering a partly demolished girder bridge which carried the main road across the river and a foot bridge across a tributary lower down.

The German force advancing down the Saltdal consisted of two battalions of mountain troops, two companies of cyclists and a mountain artillery battery. Early on 25 May, the Germans began attacking the positions on the east side of the river and forced some of the defenders to fall back across it, in one case by a holding onto a line of linked rifle slings. However, some of Stockwell's reserves crossed to the east bank lower down and halted the German advance.

During the night of 25/26 May, the Germans had built a temporary bridge higher up the Saltdal and transferred the main weight of their attack to the west bank, threatening to surround Stockwell's position.

Earlier on 25 May, Gubbins had been informed that following the Allied disasters after the opening of the Battle of France, the force at Bodø was to be evacuated. At noon on 26 May, he ordered Stockwell to fall back to Rognan and across the fjord. Stockwell's force began to withdraw in the mid-afternoon under heavy pressure. He was aided by two Gloster Gladiator fighters (one of them flown by Rhodesian ace Caesar Hull) operating from the newly completed airstrip at Bodø. (A third had crashed on takeoff from the rough strip.) They claimed two German aircraft shot down and two damaged, challenging the German air supremacy for the first time.

The Irish Guards and other troops made a fighting withdrawal to Rognan, mostly down the west side of the Saltdal, removing or destroying stores and ammunition as they fell back. From Rognan, they were evacuated by a large ferry and ten smaller "puffers". The ferry broke down and had to be towed, and the troops aboard came under fire from the leading German cyclists and were showered with burning timber from the final demolitions. One company of the Irish Guards was unable to cross the river to be evacuated with the rest of the force, but extricated itself by a march of 20 miles (32 km) across country to a point further along the shore of the fjord.

== Allied evacuation ==
In the evening of 27 May Bodø was bombed and strafed by the Luftwaffe. The improvised airstrip, the radio station and 420 of the town's 760 buildings were destroyed. Twelve people were killed and a further 5,000 were made homeless.

The British force was pulled back from Finneid to Fauske, closer to Bodø, to allow for an easier evacuation. A Norwegian battalion (1st battalion, 15th Regiment) had recently arrived from Bardufoss to hold the northern part of the Finneid position. They were not immediately informed of the British withdrawal, and a company was unable to escape. During three consecutive nights starting on the night of 29/30 May, the British force at Bodø was evacuated by destroyers. To avoid alerting the Germans, no noisy demolitions were carried out but vehicles and items of equipment which could not be removed were disabled and thrown into the sea. All military and civilian petrol stocks in the area were removed or destroyed. There was no serious pressure from the German troops, and low cloud prevented the Luftwaffe interfering. Gubbins left on the last destroyer on the night of 31 May/1 June. The Norwegian 1st battalion, 15th Regiment, was also evacuated, by small boats, to the Lofoten Islands.

== Aftermath ==
The North Western Expeditionary Force evacuated Narvik and Harstad by 8 June. The first German ski patrols from their forces in Nordland made contact with General Dietl's troops near Narvik on 14 June.

In his report on the campaign, Auchinleck complimented Gubbins, who was awarded the DSO. Although he was recommended for the command of a division, he rejoined MI(R) and was appointed to organise the Auxiliary Units, a stay-behind force which would act against a German invasion of Britain. Later in 1940, Gubbins was appointed director of operations of the Special Operations Executive, and in 1943 became its director.

Although the Scots Guards had not performed well during the campaign, Trappes-Lomax argued that they were not equipped or trained for the conditions they encountered (having been employed on Public duties immediately before being deployed to Norway) and were exhausted by continual air attack. Trappes-Lomax was eventually promoted to brigadier and served as a staff officer in Southern Command in India.

The Independent Companies were disbanded after the Norwegian Campaign, though some of their personnel transferred to the commandos. Lieutenant Colonel Stockwell, who was also awarded the DSO, ran a Commando Training Centre at Lochailort before being appointed to command a brigade and eventually a division.

== See also ==
- List of British military equipment of World War II
- List of Norwegian military equipment of World War II
- List of German military equipment of World War II

== Notes ==
Footnotes

=== Printed works ===
- Adams, Jack (1989). The Doomed Expedition: The Campaign in Norway, 1940. Pen & Sword Military. ISBN 978-0-85052-036-1.
- Brown, David (2013). Naval Operations of the Campaign in Norway, April–June 1940. Naval Staff Histories. Routledge. ISBN 978-1-135-27370-5.
- Rhys-Jones, Graham (2008). Churchill and the Norway Campaign 1940. Pen & Sword Military. ISBN 978-1-84415-753-2.
- Wilkinson, Peter; Astley, Joan Bright (2010). Gubbins and SOE. Barnsley: Pen & Sword Military. ISBN 978-1-84884-421-6.
