= Pender =

Pender or Penders may refer to:

== Places ==
- Pender, Nebraska
- Pender County, North Carolina
- Pender Island, British Columbia
- Penders (holiday retreat), a heritage-listed holiday retreat in New South Wales, Australia.
- Pender Township, Thurston County, Nebraska
- Joseph John Pender House, in Wilson County, North Carolina

== People ==
- Baron Pender, a title in the Peerage of the United Kingdom
- Daniel Pender, Royal Navy Staff Commander, later captain
- David Pender (born 1987), former American football player
- Derek Pender (born 1983), Irish association footballer
- Fiona Pender, disappeared in Ireland in 1996, aged 25
- Harold Pender (1879–1959), American academic, author, and inventor
- Jack Pender (1918–1998), British Painter
- John Pender (1816–1896), Scottish submarine communications cable pioneer and politician
- Mark Pender (born 1957), American trumpetist
- Mel Pender (born 1937), American sprinter
- Patrick Pender (born 1996), German politician
- Paul Pender (1930–2003), American boxer and fire-fighter from Massachusetts
- Peter Pender (1936–1990), American bridge player
- Robert Pender (1867–1936), American professional baseball player, manager and umpire
- William Dorsey Pender (1834–1863), Confederate general in the American Civil War

=== Penders ===
- Jean Penders (1939–2025), Dutch politician
- Jim Penders (born c. 1972), American college baseball coach
- Ken Penders (born 1958), American comic book creator and writer
- Maura Penders, American television writer
- Mike Penders (born 2005), Belgian professional footballer
- Monica Penders (born 1964), Australian film producer
- Rob Penders (born 1975), Dutch football coach and former player
- Saul Penders (born 2003), Dutch professional footballer
- Tom Penders (born 1945), American retired college basketball coach

== Schools ==
- Pender Early College High School, North Carolina
- Pender High School, North Carolina

== Locomotives ==
- No. 3 Pender, an 1873 locomotive of the Isle of Man Railway

== See also ==
- Prendergast (surname)
