= Colin Gubbins =

British Army general (1896-1976)

Major-General Sir Colin Gubbins KCMG DSO MC
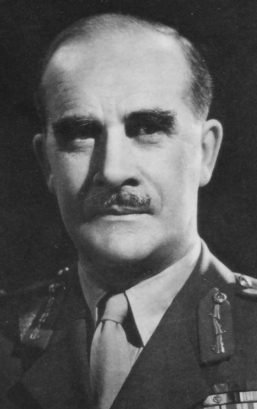
- Gubbins in the 1940s

3rd Chief of the Special Operations Executive
- In office 1943–1946
- Prime Minister: Winston Churchill
- Minister: Minister of Economic Warfare
- Preceded by: Charles Jocelyn Hambro
- Succeeded by: Position disestablished

Deputy Chief of Military Intelligence (Research) for Services and Training
- In office 1939–1940
- Chief: John Charles Francis Holland

Personal details
- Born: 2 July 1896 Tokyo, Japan
- Died: 11 February 1976 (aged 79) Stornoway, Lewis, Scotland
- Parent: John Harington Gubbins (father)
- Relatives: Colin Alexander McVean (maternal grandfather)
- Education: Cheltenham College
- Alma mater: Royal Military Academy, Woolwich; Staff College at Quetta
- Awards: Knight Commander of the Order of St Michael and St George; Distinguished Service Order; Military Cross

Military service
- Allegiance: United Kingdom
- Branch/service: British Army
- Years of service: 1914–1946
- Rank: Major-General
- Unit: Royal Field Artillery
- Commands: 24th Guards Brigade (1940); Auxiliary Units (1940); Special Operations Executive (1943–1946)
- Battles/wars: First World War; Battle of the Somme; Battle of Arras; Battle of St Quentin; Russian Civil War; North Russia Campaign; Irish War of Independence; Second World War; Norwegian campaign
- Service number: 14618

Major-General Sir Colin McVean Gubbins, KCMG, DSO, MC (2 July 1896 – 11 February 1976) was one of the co-founders of the Special Operations Executive (SOE) in the Second World War. The purpose of SOE was to conduct espionage, sabotage and reconnaissance in countries occupied by the Axis powers. Earlier in the war, while under the command of Jo Holland, Gubbins was also responsible for setting up the secret Auxiliary Units, a commando stay-behind force based around the Home Defence Scheme of Section D, to operate on the flanks and to the rear of German lines if the United Kingdom were invaded during Operation Sea Lion, Germany's planned invasion.

The Soviet double agent Kim Philby, who worked for Gubbins for some time, later wrote of Gubbins in his memoirs:

The air of his office crackled with energy, and his speech was both friendly and mercifully brief. A friend of mine nicknamed him "Whirling Willie" after a character in a contemporary comic strip. It was rumoured that he could only find time for his girl-friends at breakfast. But he was man enough to keep them.

Gubbins sought to create a legacy where he placed himself at the center of nearly every action of the war, often claiming credit for the creations of others – such as the invention of the myth that he was the man to come up with the idea of both the Auxiliary Units and the Shetland Bus, where they were both in reality inventions of his main political rival, Laurence Grand. During the war, his contemporaries often thought of him as a difficult to work with, and some of them even went so far as to call him evil. When the newly minted Chief of the Secret Intelligence Service, Stewart Menzies, gained executive authority over the future of the SOE, Menzies removed Gubbins from his position and forced him to retire with the pension of a Colonel, despite the fact that he was an Acting Major General. He acted quickly upon the notion that history is written by the victors, as he was already personal friends with most of the historians who would write his story, such as M. R. D. Foot, and even himself wrote the first official narrative of the SOE in 1945. Therefore, he secured himself at the center of the story, and the stories of John Charles Francis Holland and Laurence Grand were laid aside as footnotes in Gubbins' story for decades.

== Early life ==
Gubbins was born in Japan on 2 July 1896, the younger son and third child of John Harington Gubbins (1852–1929), Oriental Secretary at the British Legation. In the 1901 census he is shown living with his grandparents, Colin Alexander McVean and four siblings at Killiemore House on the Isle of Mull. He was educated at Cheltenham College and at the Royal Military Academy, Woolwich where he graduated 56th out of 70 cadets.

== Military career ==
=== First World War ===
Gubbins was commissioned into the Royal Field Artillery in 1914. On the outbreak of war he was visiting the German city of Heidelberg in order to improve his German language skills and had to make a perilous journey back to Britain via Belgium, arriving in Dover the day before Britain entered the conflict. Gubbins served as a battery officer on the Western Front – initially with the 126th Battery as part of the British Army's 3rd Corps. He first saw action on 22 May 1915 in the Second Battle of Ypres and on 9 June was promoted to lieutenant.

In July 1916 he participated in the Battle of the Somme and received the Military Cross, the citation for which, appearing in The London Gazette in September 1916, reads as follows:

For conspicuous gallantry. When one of his guns and its detachment were blown up by a heavy shell, he organised a rescue party and personally helped to dig out the wounded while shells were falling all round.

On 7 October he was wounded in the neck by a gunshot but recovered fully. In the spring of 1917 Gubbins participated in the Battle of Arras and in the winter suffered the effects of mustard gas. In early 1918 Gubbins was promoted to captain and took part in the Battle of St Quentin. Shortly afterwards he was evacuated from the front with a case of trench fever (17 April 1918).

=== Interwar period ===
In 1919 he joined the staff of General Sir Edmund Ironside in the North Russia Campaign serving as his ADC in Murmansk from 13 April to 27 September 1919. His service in the Russian Civil War left Gubbins with a life-long hatred of Communism.

On 2 December 1919 Gubbins was posted to the 47th Battery of the 5th Division in Kildare during the Irish War of Independence. He served as a military intelligence officer and in 1920 attended a three-day course in guerrilla warfare organized by the HQ 5th Division. Gubbins characterised his service in the conflict as "being shot at from behind hedges by men in trilbys and mackintoshes and not allowed to shoot back".

Promoted to Brigade Major, after the war was ended by the Anglo-Irish Treaty, Gubbins provided 18-pounder artillery pieces to the Provisional Government of Ireland. The Irish Army used the artillery pieces in their attack against the Anti-Treaty IRA-held Four Courts, which began both the Battle of Dublin and the Irish Civil War. In August 1922, Gubbins reluctantly provided a gun carriage and six black horses for the military funeral of his former enemy: ex-IRA Director of Intelligence and Irish Army commander-in-chief Michael Collins, who had been ambushed and shot in the head by the anti-Treaty IRA. According to Stephen Dorril, however, Gubbins often expressed admiration in his later years for Michael Collins, whom he regarded as, "the guerrilla soldier par excellence. Eventually he was posted back to England, that October.

His experiences in the Russian Civil War and the Irish War of Independence stimulated his lifelong interest in irregular warfare. One of the lessons drawn from the latter war was the importance of captured enemy documents which had provided the security forces with a wealth of invaluable intelligence on the IRA. Upon later establishing SOE, one of the key security features introduced was "Commit as little as possible to writing. Memorise if you can. If you must carry documents, select what you must carry. Burn all secret waste and carbons".

After a period with signals intelligence at GHQ India, Gubbins graduated from the Staff College at Quetta in 1928, and in 1931 was appointed GSO3 in the Russian section of the War Office. Having been promoted to brevet major, in 1935 he joined MT1, the policy-making branch of the Military Training Directorate.

In October 1938, in the aftermath of the Munich Agreement, he was sent to the Sudetenland as a military member of the International Commission. Promoted to brevet lieutenant-colonel, he joined GS(R) — later to become MI(R) — in April 1939 he co-wrote training manuals on irregular warfare tactics for resistance movements, later translated and dropped into occupied Europe. He also made a visit to Warsaw to discuss sabotage and subversion with the Polish General Staff.

=== Second World War ===
When British forces were mobilized in August 1939, Gubbins was appointed Chief of Staff to the military mission to Poland led by Adrian Carton de Wiart. Gubbins and some of a contingent from MI(R) arrived in Warsaw on 3 September, within hours of the British declaration of war, but after only a few days the mission was forced by the rapidly deteriorating situation to abandon Warsaw. They finally crossed into Roumania in late September. Gubbins and Carton de Wiart were among the first people to report on the effectiveness of the German Panzer tactics.

In October 1939, following his return to Britain, Gubbins was sent to Paris as the head of a military mission to the Czech and Polish forces under French command.

At this stage in the war, Gubbins consistently oversold the abilities of MI(R) to the Czechs and the Romanians. He overpromised on what MI(R) was, and what he could do for the resistance networks there. His superior officer, Jo Holland, became embarrassed and enraged at Gubbins' unprofessional conduct in Europe, and recalled him from the field for reprimand. One of Holland's greater points of regret with Gubbins was that he was consistently undermining the missions of another unit that existed at this time, the Section for Destruction (Section D), which was a unit of the Secret Intelligence Service (MI6).

He was summoned from France in March 1940 to raise the Independent Companies, forerunners of the British Commandos, which he later commanded in several actions in Nordland during the Norwegian campaign (9 April – 10 June 1940). Although he was criticized in some quarters for having asked too much of untried troops, he proved to be a bold and resourceful commander. During the operations around Bodø, he assumed command of 24th (Guards) Brigade, and was ruthless in dismissing a Guards battalion commander whose nerve had apparently failed. Gubbins was awarded the Distinguished Service Order for his service in the campaign.

Although he was recommended for command of a division by Lieutenant General Claude Auchinleck, the commander of all troops in the Norwegian campaign, on his return to Britain he nevertheless rejoined MI(R) and was directed by General Headquarters Home Forces to form the secret Auxiliary Units, a commando force based around the Home Guard together with regular army sabotage teams, to operate on the flanks and to the rear of German lines if Britain were ever invaded. This was an idea that was initially invented by the leader of Section D, a man named Laurence Grand, who had actually established an organization called the Home Defence Scheme. Gubbins, and other members of the uniformed military he was acquainted with, were extremely distrustful of civilian undercover operatives being in control of large weapons stashes, which prompted the transfer of this program to MI(R).

=== Special Operations Executive ===
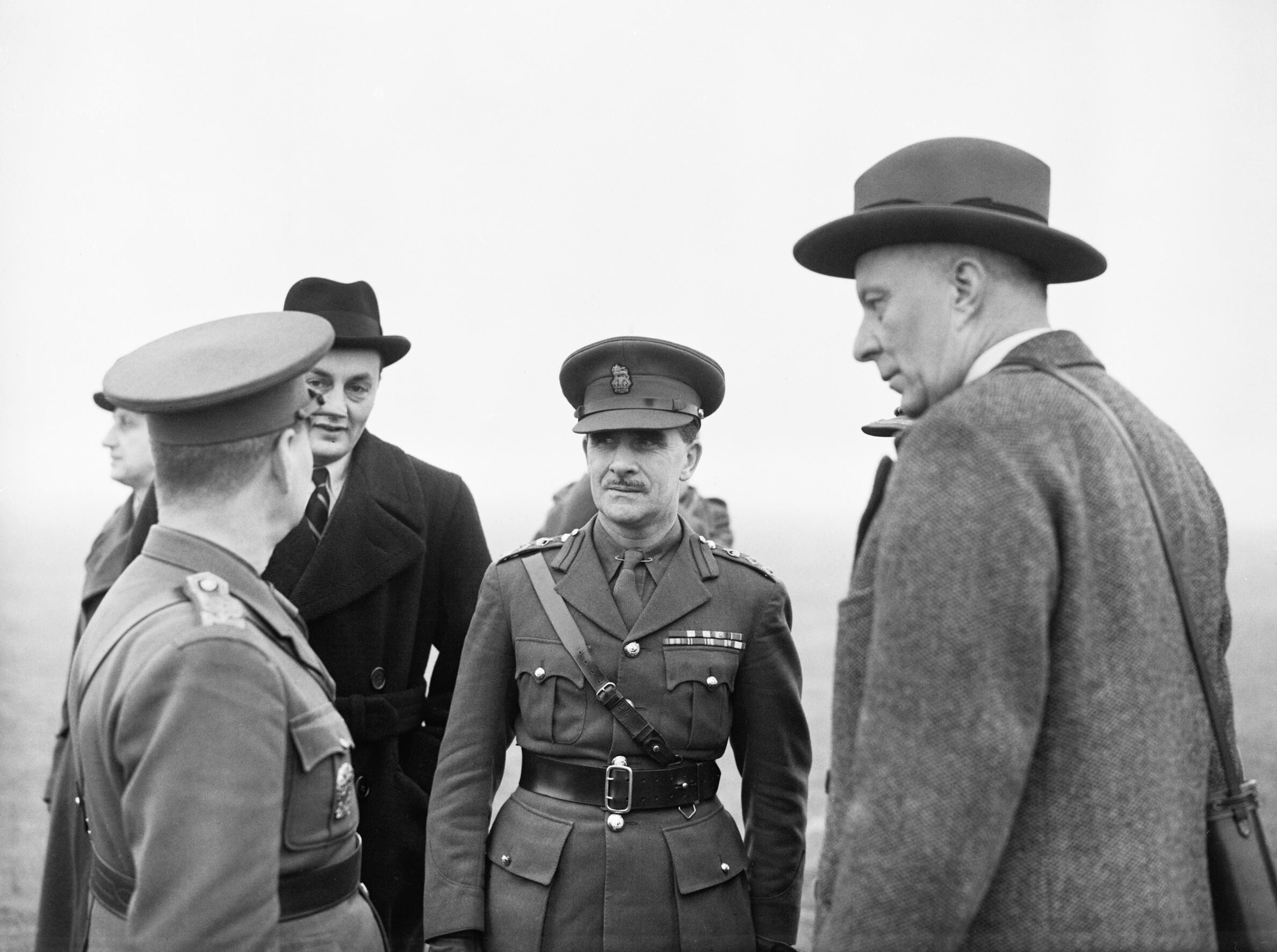
Hugh Dalton (right), Minister of Economic Warfare, and Colin Gubbins, chief of the Special Operations Executive, talking to a Czech officer during a visit to Czech troops near Leamington Spa, Warwickshire

In November 1940 Gubbins was promoted to Acting Brigadier and, at the request of Hugh Dalton, the Minister of Economic Warfare, was seconded to the Special Operations Executive (SOE), which had recently been established to "coordinate all action by way of sabotage and subversion against the enemy overseas". Besides maintaining his existing connections with the Poles and Czechs, Gubbins was given three tasks: to evaluate existing training facilities, and if necessary to set up new training facilities; to devise operating procedures acceptable to the Admiralty and Air Ministry; and to establish close working relations with the Joint Planning Staff.

Despite many frustrations and disappointments, mainly due to shortage of aircraft, he persevered with training organizers and dispatching them into the field. The first liaison flight to Poland took place in February 1941, and during 1942 and 1943 European resistance movements aided by SOE scored notable successes, including a raid on a heavy water production plant in Norway.

Gubbins is commonly referenced as the man responsible for the establishment of the Shetland Bus, a regular link between Shetland and Norway, which, by the spring of 1942, had infiltrated almost 100 saboteurs and 150 tons of explosive into the country. He is not, however, the man who created this organization of amateur smugglers. While it might be easy to overlook the fact that it was the Norwegian escaped fisherman taking refuge in Shetland who first created the Bus, even within the British military, Gubbins merely adapted an earlier operation established by Laurence Grand and his Section for Destruction, which was called the "Cruising Club," and led primarily by Frank George Griffith Carr, a member of the Royal Naval Volunteer Reserve who had been seconded to Section D.

In September 1943 GHQ Middle East, the Foreign Office, and the Joint Intelligence Committee sought to remove SOE's autonomy. Despite having the firm support of Dalton's successor, Lord Selborne, the resulting modus vivendi placed SOE's field operations under the direction of theatre commanders. Sir Charles Hambro, the executive head of SOE, resigned in protest. Gubbins was appointed as his replacement. SOE's position nevertheless remained precarious, and in January 1944 there was a further attempt to dismantle SOE, following the revelation that SOE's operations in the Netherlands had been penetrated by Nazi intelligence.

As head of SOE, Gubbins co-ordinated the activities of resistance movements worldwide. Gubbins' role involved consultation at the highest level with the Foreign Office, the Chiefs of Staff, representatives of the resistance organizations, governments-in-exile, and other Allied agencies including particularly the Office of Strategic Services (OSS). It turned out that the organized resistance was more effective than Whitehall had expected; in northwest Europe, where SOE's activities were under Gubbins's personal control, General Dwight D. Eisenhower later estimated that the contribution of the French Resistance alone had been worth six divisions.

== Later life ==
When SOE was shut down in 1946 the War Office could offer Gubbins no suitable position, and when he retired from the army he became the managing director of a carpet and textile manufacturer. He remained in touch with people in many of the countries he had helped to liberate, and was invited by Prince Bernhard of the Netherlands to join the Bilderberg group. He was also a supporter of the Special Forces Club, which he had co-founded.

== Personal life ==
Gubbins's first marriage was to Norah Creina (b. 1894, d.1976) on 22 October 1919. The couple had two sons, the elder, Michael, served in the SOE and was killed at Anzio in 1944. The couple were divorced in 1944 and on 25 September 1950 he married the Norwegian-born Anna Elise Tradin, née Jensen (b. 1914, d. 2007). His niece was the journalist and writer Una-Mary Parker.

== Death ==
A shooter and fisherman, Gubbins spent his last years at his home in the Hebrides, on the Isle of Harris. He was appointed Deputy Lieutenant of the islands area of the Western Isles in 1976. Gubbins died at Stornoway in the Hebrides on 11 February 1976.

== Testimonials ==
His star cryptographer at SOE was Leo Marks, whose book Between Silk and Cyanide (1998) contains a detailed portrait of Gubbins and his work as Marks knew it. At one point (p. 222), Marks describes Gubbins:

Described by Tommy [Marks' closest friend] as 'a real Highland toughie, bloody brilliant, should be the next CD', he was short enough to make me feel average, with a moustache which was as clipped as his delivery and eyes which didn't mirror his soul or any other such trivia. The general's eyes reflected the crossed swords on his shoulders, warning all comers not to cross them with him. It was a shock to realize they were focused on me.

In the book Virtual History (1997), Andrew Roberts and Niall Ferguson call Gubbins "one of the war's unsung heroes".

There is a very detailed account of Gubbins' wartime career in Churchill's Ministry Of Ungentlemanly Warfare, by Giles Milton (John Murray, 2016)

== See also ==
- Edmund Charaszkiewicz
- Jan Kowalewski
- Krystyna Skarbek

== Sources ==
- "Oxford DNB article: Gubbins, Sir Colin McVean". ODNB. Oxford University Press. 2004.
- Profile

== Bibliography ==
- Giles Milton The Ministry of Ungentlemanly Warfare, 2016, John Murray. ISBN 978-1-444-79895-1
- Atkin, Malcolm (2015). Fighting Nazi Occupation: British Resistance 1939 – 1945. Barnsley: Pen and Sword. ISBN 978-1-47383-377-7.
- Wilkinson, Peter; Astley, Joan Bright (1993). Gubbins and SOE. London: Leo Cooper. ISBN 0-85052-556-X.
- A. R. B. Linderman: Rediscovering irregular warfare. Colin Gubbins and the origins of Britain's Special Operations Executive, Norman, OK (University of Oklahoma Press) 2015. ISBN 978-0-8061-5167-0
- Mead, Richard (2007). Churchill's Lions: a biographical guide to the key British generals of World War II. Stroud (UK): Spellmount. ISBN 978-1-86227-431-0.
- Smart, Nick (2005). Biographical Dictionary of British Generals of the Second World War. Barnesley: Pen & Sword. ISBN 1-84415-049-6.
