= Una-Mary Parker =

English journalist and novelist (1930–2019)

- Born: 30 March 1930
- Died: 11 April 2019 (aged 89)
- Occupation: Author
- Spouse: Archie Parker
- Children: 2
- Relatives: Duchess of Cornwall (cousin); Major-General Gubbins (uncle)

Una-Mary Parker (née McVean-Gubbins; 30 March 1930 – 11 April 2019) was an English journalist and novelist.

== Family ==
Parker was the daughter of Hugh Power McVean-Gubbins, a businessman, and his wife, Laura. She was a cousin of the Duchess of Cornwall. She married photographer Archie Parker on 6 October 1951 with whom she had two children. She and her husband, a royal photographer, were a high society couple of the 1960s and 1970s, and regularly made headlines with their couture clothes.

== Journalism and fiction ==
In addition to working as a journalist for the Daily Mail and Evening Standard, she also spent ten years as social editor of the British magazine, The Tatler.

Parker's first novel, Riches, appeared in October 1987 and has since been widely read internationally. Her novels include Scandals (1988), Temptations (1989), Veil of Secrets (1990), Enticements (1990),The Palace Affair (1992), Forbidden Feelings (1993), Only the Best (1993), A Guilty Pleasure (1994), False Promises (1995), Taking Control (1996), A Dangerous Desire (1997), Dark Passions (1998), Secrets of the Night (1998), Broken Trust (1999), Sweet Vengeance (2000), Moment of Madness (2001), Alexia's Secret (2008)

== Later life ==
In 2016, Parker revealed that she was suffering from glaucoma. She died on 11 April 2019, aged 89.
