= Richard Sugden =

British Army officer (1871–1951)

Brigadier-General Richard Sugden CB CMG DSO* TD DL JP
- Born: 21 August 1871; Brighouse, West Riding of Yorkshire
- Died: 9 May 1951 (aged 79); Brighouse, West Riding of Yorkshire
- Military career
- Allegiance: United Kingdom
- Branch: British Army
- Service years: 1899–1926
- Rank: Brigadier-General
- Commands: 4th Battalion, Duke of Wellington's Regiment; 151st Infantry Brigade; 147th Infantry Brigade
- Conflicts: Second Boer War; First World War
- Awards: Companion of the Order of the Bath; Companion of the Order of St Michael and St George; Distinguished Service Order and Bar; Territorial Decoration; Croix de guerre (France); Mentioned in Dispatches

Brigadier-General Richard Edgar Sugden, CB, CMG, DSO & Bar, TD, DL, JP (21 August 1871 – 9 May 1951) was a British Army officer who was highly decorated for his service in the First World War.

== Early life ==
Sugden was the son of Richard Sugden and Sarah Elizabeth Ramsden. He was educated at Marlborough College.

== Career ==
After leaving school Sugden went into the family business. He was also a keen rugby player, and played for Yorkshire Rugby Football Union in 1895 and 1896.

In 1899 he volunteered for service with the Imperial Yeomanry, and saw active service in the Second Boer War with the 3rd Battalion in the Transvaal. During the conflict he received a commission as a lieutenant. After the war ended in June 1902, Sugden returned home with the other officers and men of his battalion in the SS Kinfauns Castle leaving Cape Town in early August 1902. He relinquished his commission the following month and was granted the honorary rank of Lieutenant in the Army. In 1904 he transferred to the 4th Battalion, Duke of Wellington's Regiment, a unit of the Territorial Army.

Sugden was serving as the second-in-command of his battalion at the start of the First World War. He fought in the Second Battle of Ypres, and was wounded in September 1915. He returned to his regiment the following November. Sugden was awarded the Distinguished Service Order on 3 June 1916 and on 4 September 1916 he became Commanding Officer of the 4th Battalion DWR. On 17 December 1917 he was awarded a Bar to his DSO. He took command of the 151st Infantry Brigade, taking over as general officer commanding (GOC) from Cuthbert Thomas Martin, who had been killed, and was granted the temporary rank of brigadier general while employed in this role. The brigade was engaged in action in France between October 1918 and the Armistice of 11 November 1918.

After the war, Sugden remained in the Territorial Army and commanded the 147th Infantry Brigade until his retirement in 1926. He was made a Companion of the Order of the Bath in the 1926 Birthday Honours. After retirement from the army he played an active role in Brighouse society, becoming a Justice of the Peace and serving as a Deputy Lieutenant of the West Riding of Yorkshire. He became Honorary Colonel of the 4th Battalion DWR in 1931.

== Personal life ==
On 30 November 1907 he married Alice Healy; she died less a month later following a skating accident while the couple where on their honeymoon in Paris. Sugden married, secondly, Nora Wayman in 1910. Together they had three children.
