= 147th Infantry Brigade (United Kingdom) =

Infantry brigade of the British Army

2nd West Riding Brigade 147th (2nd West Riding) Brigade 147th Infantry Brigade
- Active: 1908–19; 1920–46; 1946–67
- Country: United Kingdom
- Branch: Territorial Army
- Type: Infantry
- Size: Brigade
- Part of: 49th (West Riding) Infantry Division
- Nickname: The Polar Bears (Second World War divisional nickname)
- Engagements: First World War; Second World War

Commanders
- Notable commanders: Richard Sugden; John Prendergast

Insignia
- 147th brigade First World War battle patches (1917).: Top (l-r)1/4th, 1/5th, 1/6th and 1/7th Duke of Wellington's Regiment, worn on the back of the collar. Lower (l-r) 147th MG company, 147th trench mortar battery.

The 147th Infantry Brigade was an infantry brigade of the British Army, part of the Territorial Force (Territorial Army after 1920), that served in both the First and the Second World Wars with the 49th (West Riding) Infantry Division.

== History ==
=== Formation ===
The brigade was raised in 1908 upon the creation of the Territorial Force as the 2nd West Riding Brigade, part of the West Riding Division. The brigades' composition was of the 4th, 5th, 6th and 7th Volunteer battalions of the Duke of Wellington's (West Riding Regiment).

=== First World War ===
The division was mobilised in early August 1914 when the First World War began and, when asked, most of the men volunteered for Imperial Service.

In May 1915 the division was numbered as the 49th (West Riding) Division and the brigade became 147th (1/2nd) West Riding Brigade. The battalions were also redesignated, adopting the '1/' prefix (1/4th DWR) to distinguish them from the 2nd Line battalions being formed at the same time in 186th (2/2nd West Riding) Brigade, part of 62nd (2nd West Riding) Division. Most of these 2nd Line units consisted of the few men who did not originally wish to serve overseas, or were not eligible, and the battalions were to act as a reserve for the 1st Line units when they were sent overseas. However, following the Military Service Act 1916, most of these did end up being sent overseas.

The brigade served with the division mainly in the Great War in the trenches of the Western Front. During the war the brigade was awarded a Victoria Cross belonging to Private Arthur Poulter of the 1/4th Battalion.

==== Order of battle ====
- 1/4th Battalion, Duke of Wellington's (West Riding Regiment)
- 1/5th Battalion, Duke of Wellington's (West Riding Regiment) (until January 1918)
- 1/6th Battalion, Duke of Wellington's (West Riding Regiment)
- 1/7th Battalion, Duke of Wellington's (West Riding Regiment)
- 147th Machine Gun Company, Machine Gun Corps (formed 26 January 1916, moved to 49th Battalion, Machine Gun Corps 1 March 1918)
- 147th Trench Mortar Battery (formed 12 June 1916)

=== Interwar ===
Both the brigade and division were disbanded shortly after the end of the war, as was the rest of the Territorial Force. However, both were reformed in the Territorial Army, which was formed on a similar basis as the Territorial Force and the brigade, now the 147th (2nd West Riding) Infantry Brigade, again with all four battalions of the Duke of Wellington's Regiment were also reconstituted.

In the late 1930s, however, the United Kingdom strengthened its air defences by converting many infantry battalions of the Territorial Army into anti-aircraft and searchlight battalions. As a result, in 1936, the 5th Battalion, Duke of Wellington's Regiment was transferred to the Royal Engineers and converted into the 43rd (The Duke of Wellington's Regiment) Anti-Aircraft Battalion, Royal Engineers. It was assigned to the 31st (North Midland) Anti-Aircraft Group, 2nd Anti-Aircraft Division (itself converted from HQ of 46th (North Midland) Division) alongside other infantry battalions that had been converted into the anti-aircraft or searchlight role.

In 1938 the 4th Battalion was transferred to the Royal Artillery and converted into the 58th (The Duke of Wellington's) Anti-Tank Regiment, Royal Artillery and served as the anti-tank regiment for the 49th Division. In the same year, the brigade received the 5th Battalion, West Yorkshire Regiment from the 146th (1st West Riding) Infantry Brigade of the division. The brigade was later redesignated the 147th Infantry Brigade

=== Second World War ===
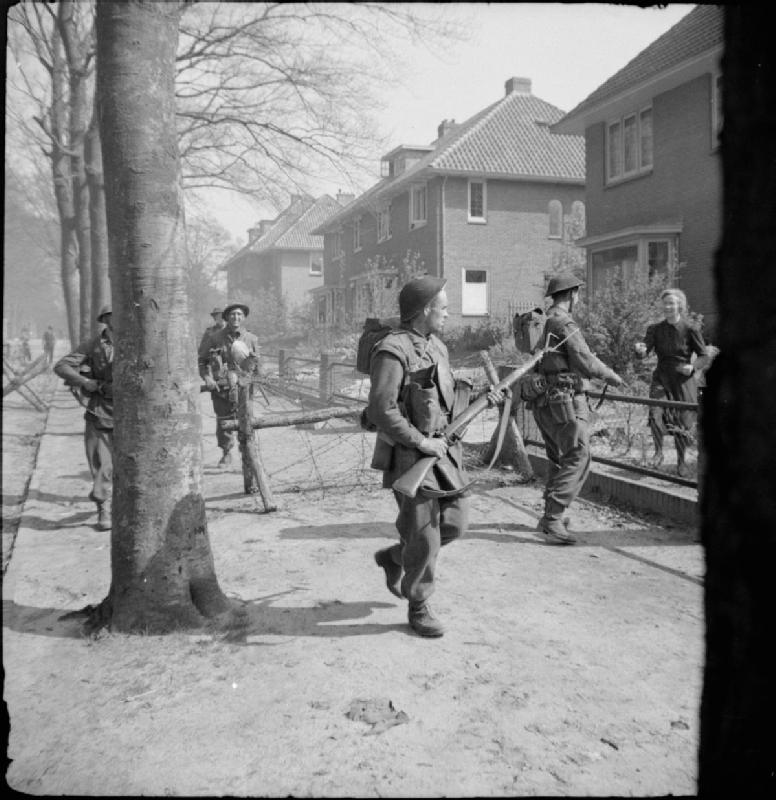
Infantrymen of the 11th Battalion, Royal Scots Fusiliers, 49th (West Riding) Division, searching houses in Ede in the Netherlands, 17 April 1945.

During the Second World War, the 147th Brigade remained as part of the 49th (West Riding) Infantry Division throughout the war but did not see service in the Norwegian Campaign, being replaced in the division by the Regular 24th Guards Brigade and remained in the United Kingdom. The brigade was stationed in Iceland, and adopted as its insignia the polar bear on an ice floe. In 1942 it was transferred back to the United Kingdom until June 1944, when it invaded Normandy shortly after the initial D-Day landings on 6 June and fought in the battle for Caen in Operation Martlet (where 6th DWR suffered such severe casualties that it was disbanded) and the Second Battle of the Odon and later in the capture of Le Havre (Operation Astonia), clearing the Channel Coast, and the Battle of the Scheldt. With the rest of 49th Division, the brigade fought its last battle of the war in April 1945 in the Liberation of Arnhem and the fierce battles that led up to it. During the fighting on the Continent, the 49th Infantry Division was nicknamed the "Polar Bears" because of their divisional insignia and were christened by Lord Haw-Haw, the Nazi propaganda broadcaster, as the "Polar Bear Butchers".

==== Order of battle, Second World War ====
- 1/5th Battalion, West Yorkshire Regiment to (until 7 September 1942)
- 1/6th Battalion, Duke of Wellington's Regiment (became 6th Battalion from 28 January 1943, left 6 July 1944)
- 1/7th Battalion, Duke of Wellington's Regiment (became 7th Battalion 18 February 1943)
- 147th Infantry Brigade Anti-Tank Company (formed 20 March 1940, disbanded 1 August 1941)
- 11th Battalion, Royal Scots Fusiliers (from 8 September 1942)
- 1st Battalion, Leicestershire Regiment (from 6 July 1944)

== Bibliography ==
- Cole, Howard (1973). Formation Badges of World War 2 Britain, Commonwealth and Empire. London: Arms and Armour Press.
- Hibbard, Mike; Gibbs, Gary (2016). Infantry Divisions, Identification Schemes 1917 (1 ed.). Wokingham: The Military History Society.
