= Special Forces Club =

Private members club in London

- Formation: 1945 (81 years ago)
- Founder: Major General Sir Colin Gubbins
- Type: Private members' club
- Key people: The Princess Royal (patron); The Lord Sedwill (president)
- Website: sfclub.org

The Special Forces Club (SFC) is a private members' club located in Knightsbridge, London. Initially established in 1945 for former personnel of the Special Operations Executive, members of wartime resistance organisations, the Special Air Service, Special Boat Service and First Aid Nursing Yeomanry, its membership now includes those who had served, or were serving, in organisations and units closely associated with special operations and the intelligence community.

== Foundation and membership ==
The SFC was founded in 1945 on the initiative of Major General Sir Colin Gubbins, the last Chief of the Special Operations Executive (SOE).

The club was intended by its founders to be a meeting place for both those who had served in the SOE and for members of kindred organisations. This tradition has continued, with the club maintaining a close relationship with the Office of Strategic Services (OSS); like-minded groups in Australia, Canada and New Zealand; along with the successors of European and other resistance organisations.

Unlike many other clubs that were open only to men and officers, it was initially open "only to ex SOE agents and personnel, and to Resistance members from all over the SOE's areas." The members of the Special Forces Club had a cheap membership card that gave them the right to stay in London at a very modest charge. The SFC has always welcomed all ranks and men and women, reflecting the membership and spirit of the SOE. John Singlaub was the club's honorary vice president.

After 1964, the members of the Special Forces Association, such as selected partisans and resistance leaders, started to have a second type of membership card for which there was no fee. During the Special Forces annual dinner in 1964, Colin Gubbins affirmed that the first purpose of the SOE was to "establish a Club which would be of direct practical and immediate benefit to the younger members of SOE, men and women who had joined us during the war and who at the end of it had to start a completely new life in a strange and upset world." The second institutional objective of the SOE was to "maintain and strengthen even further the intimate links which, through our wartime activities, we had built with men of goodwill in all the occupied countries in Europe and Asia, to the end of trying to foster mutual understanding and create a happier world. In all these countries, men who had been in constant intimate association with us for years, some of them hitherto obscure, came at the War's end into the highest government offices".

After Gubbins' death in 1976, a fund was set up in his memory by his close friend Margot Morse, SOE's former Head of Registry. Morse later went on to act as chief executive of the club during the late 1970s when under her leadership the club faced down an existential financial crisis.

Today, the club's membership is drawn primarily from the intelligence and security communities, both military and civilian, and Special Forces along with other organisations and individuals whose work reflects the ethos of the club such as high-threat bomb disposal experts and members drawn from the psyops community. Great stress is placed on the personal qualities of applicants along with their technical qualifications and operational experience to ensure that the club maintains its reputation as one of the most discreet locations in London. Current membership includes a number of holders of the Victoria Cross and George Cross.

== Premises ==
The club is located in Knightsbridge, London. The building is not owned by the club, but is leased from Cadogan Estates.

The club is famous for its collection of photographs of members of SOE and OSS and those from the post war era. Those members killed in action have their photograph framed in black. There is also a collection of prints and original paintings reflecting the background of the membership.

The club has undergone a radical transformation in terms of its business practices to ensure its efficient administration and has a very active programme of guest speakers and events. In 2015 the club celebrated its 70th anniversary and 75th anniversary of the founding of the SOE with a major dinner and reception at the Natural History Museum (SOE Station XVb during the War) attended by the club's patron Anne, Princess Royal and the Crown Princes of Norway and Denmark plus 850 members and guests, including veterans of the SOE and OSS.

In recent years the club has refurbished its bar and dining room, and there is a rolling programme of improvements to the bedrooms and other facilities.

There is a long-standing tradition whereby overseas members support renovations. The Danes were responsible for a bedroom in memory of Ebbe Munck, who initiated the armed resistance movement in Denmark, the US created the Donovan Room in memory of William J. Donovan, the wartime head of the OSS, and the Dutch renovating the Prince Bernhard Room. There are also rooms named the Australian Room, the Belgian Room, the Polish Room, and the Canadian Room redecorated by members from those countries. The Norwegians refurbished the Linge Room, named after Martin Linge, the founder of the wartime Norwegian Independent Company 1, and have made other donations.

== See also ==
- List of gentlemen's clubs in London
