= George C. Prendergast =

American biomedical scientist

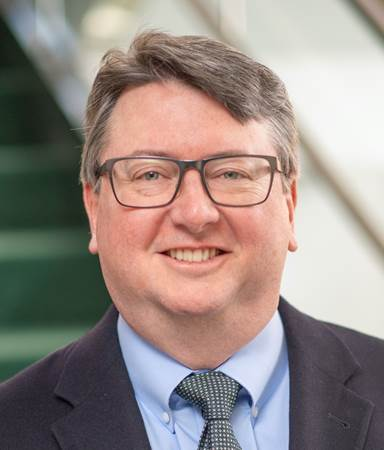
- Born: Philadelphia, Pennsylvania
- Education: Princeton University; Yale University; University of Pennsylvania
- Awards: 1995 Pew Scholar in the Biomedical Sciences
- Scientific career
- Fields: Oncology, Molecular biology, Oncoimmunology
- Workplaces: Lankenau Institute for Medical Research; DuPont Pharmaceuticals Company; The Wistar Institute; Merck Research Laboratories; Howard Hughes Medical Institute

George C. Prendergast (born 1961) is an American biomedical scientist. His research has focused on cancer pathobiology and immunology. Since 2004, he has been the president and CEO of Lankenau Institute for Medical Research, a cancer-focused research center in the U.S. He is also the co-director of the Program in Cancer Cell Biology & Signaling at the Sidney Kimmel Cancer Center, Thomas Jefferson University.

== Education ==
Prendergast earned his bachelor's degree in biochemistry from the University of Pennsylvania, his master's degree in molecular biophysics and biochemistry from Yale University and his PhD in molecular biology from Princeton University. He was later an American Cancer Society postdoctoral fellow at the Howard Hughes Medical Institute at New York University Medical Center before working in the Department of Cancer Research at Merck.

== Career ==
In 1993, Prendergast joined the faculties of The Wistar Institute and the Department of Genetics at the University of Pennsylvania. In 1999, he also became a senior director at the DuPont Pharmaceuticals Company.

In 2002, he moved his groups at Wistar and DuPont to the Lankenau Institute for Medical Research (LIMR) and became the president and CEO there in 2004. At LIMR, Prendergast created an organizational model for nonprofit biomedical research termed the acapreneurial™ model, whose stated aim is to balance academic studies with invention, product development and partnered entrepreneurialism.

Prendergast's current research focuses on new uses of IDO1 inhibitory drugs in medicine, investigations of the IDO2 enzyme in cancer and autoimmunity, and therapeutic antibodies that target the disease severity modifier genes Bin1 and RhoB to broadly treat autoimmune disorders and diabetic complications.

His research team pioneered the early discovery and development of experimental drugs that inhibit the tryptophan catabolizing enzyme IDO1 as a new type of oral immunotherapy for cancer, currently under study worldwide.

In 2008, Prendergast was recognized as one of the 250 most influential alumni of Princeton University. From 2010-2017, Prendergast was Editor-in-Chief of Cancer Research, a journal of the American Association for Cancer Research, one of the most cited in the field. In 2018, Prendergast was named The Havens Chair in Biomedical Research by the Lankenau Medical Center Foundation.

== Selected publications ==
- Prendergast, GC; Malachowski, WP; DuHadaway, JB; Muller, AJ (2017). "Discovery of IDO1 inhibitors: from bench to bedside". Cancer Research. 77 (24): 6795–6811. doi:10.1158/0008-5472.CAN-17-2285. PMC 6021761. PMID 29247038.
- Prendergast; GC (2011). "Why tumours eat tryptophan". Nature. 478 (7368): 192–4. doi:10.1038/478192a. PMID 21993754.
- Smith, C; Chang, MY; Parker, KH; Beury, DW; DuHadaway, JB; Flick, HE; Boulden, J; Sutanto-Ward, E; Soler, AP; Laury-Kleintop, LD; Mandik-Nayak, L; Metz, R; Ostrand-Rosenberg, S; Prendergast, GC; Muller, AJ (2012). "IDO is a nodal pathogenic driver of lung cancer and metastasis development". Cancer Discovery. 2 (8): 722–35. doi:10.1158/2159-8290.CD-12-0014. PMC 3677576. PMID 22822050.
- Muller, AJ; Prendergast, GC (2005). "Marrying immunotherapy with chemotherapy: why say IDO?". Cancer Research. 65 (18): 8065–8. doi:10.1158/0008-5472.CAN-05-2213. PMID 16166276.
- Muller, AJ; Duhadaway, JB; Donover, PS; Sutanto-Ward, E; Prendergast, GC (2005). "Inhibition of indoleamine 2,3-dioxygenase, an immunoregulatory target of the cancer suppression gene Bin1, potentiates cancer chemotherapy". Nature Medicine. 11 (3): 312–9. doi:10.1038/nm1196. PMID 15711557. S2CID 12338548.
- Sakamuro, D; Elliott, KJ; Wechsler-Reya, R; Prendergast, GC (1996). "BIN1 is a novel MYC-interacting protein with features of a tumour suppressor". Nature Genetics. 14 (1): 69–77. doi:10.1038/ng0996-69. PMID 8782822. S2CID 21484402.
- Ferré-D'Amaré, AR; Prendergast, GC; Ziff, EB; Burley, SK (1993). "Recognition by Max of its cognate DNA through a dimeric b/HLH/Z domain". Nature. 363 (6424): 38–45. Bibcode:1993Natur.363...38F. doi:10.1038/363038a0. PMID 8479534. S2CID 4304430.
- Prendergast, G; Ziff, E (1991). "Methylation-sensitive sequence-specific DNA binding by the c-Myc basic region". Science. 251 (4990): 186–9. Bibcode:1991Sci...251..186P. doi:10.1126/science.1987636. PMID 1987636.
- Prendergast, GC; Lawe, D; Ziff, EB (1991). "Association of Myn, the murine homolog of Max, with c-Myc stimulates methylation-sensitive DNA binding and ras cotransformation". Cell. 65 (3): 395–407. doi:10.1016/0092-8674(91)90457-A. PMID 1840505. S2CID 36903663.

== Books ==
- Prendergast GC, editor (2004). Molecular Cancer Therapeutics: Strategies for Drug Discovery and Development. New York: John Wiley & Sons. ISBN 9780471656166. Reviewed in New England Journal of Medicine 352, 422-423 [2005]
- Prendergast GC and Jaffee EM, editors (2007). Cancer Immunotherapy: Immune Suppression and Tumor Growth. 1st ed. New York: Academic Press. ISBN 9780123725516. Reviewed in New England Journal of Medicine 358, 1764-1765 [2008]
- Prendergast GC and Jaffee EM, editors (2013). Cancer Immunotherapy: Immune Suppression and Tumor Growth. 2nd ed. New York: Elsevier/Academic Press. ISBN 9780123946331.
