= John Prendergast (artist) =

American painter

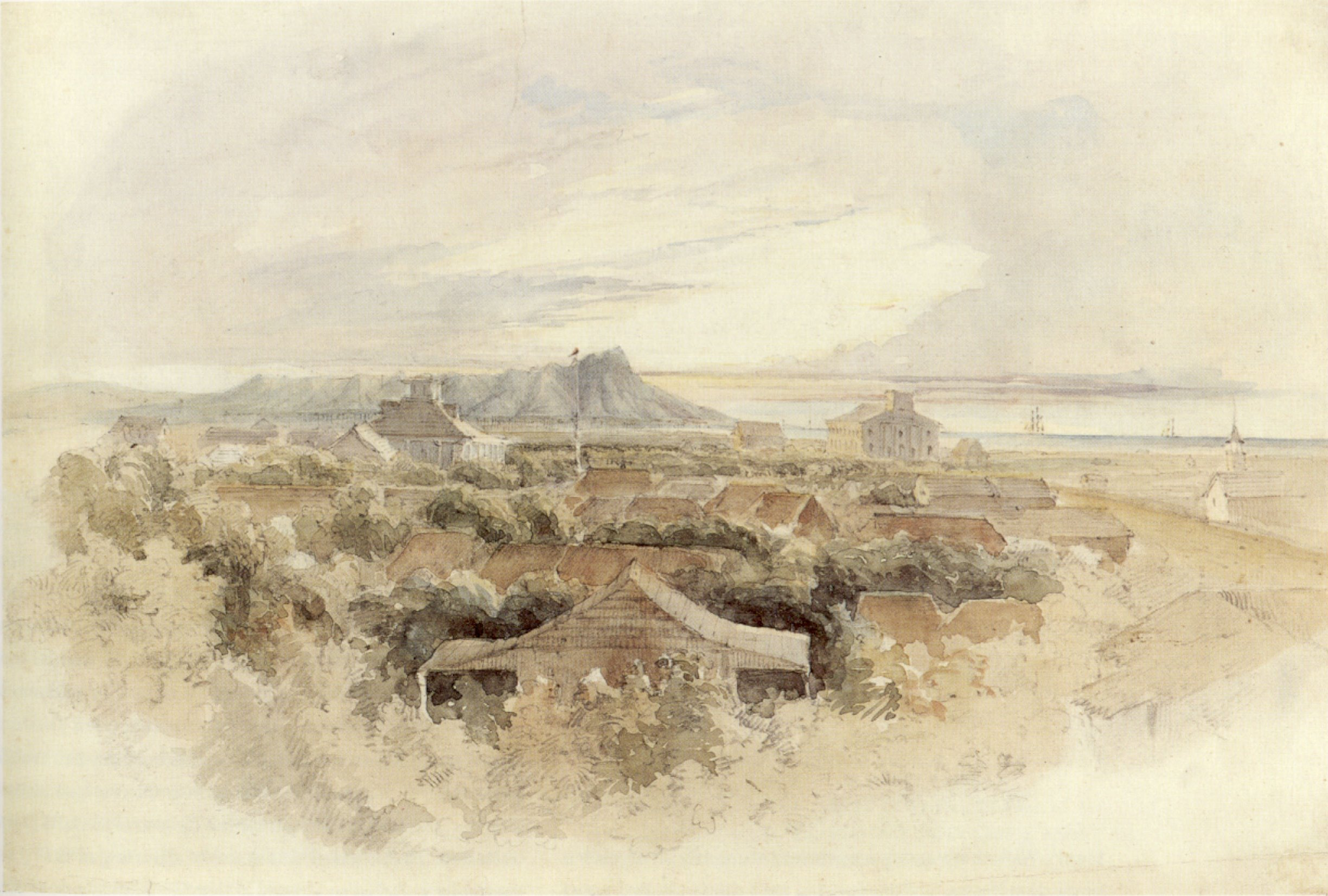
Honolulu Looking Toward Diamond Head, watercolor over pencil by John Prendergast, 1848, Honolulu Museum of Art

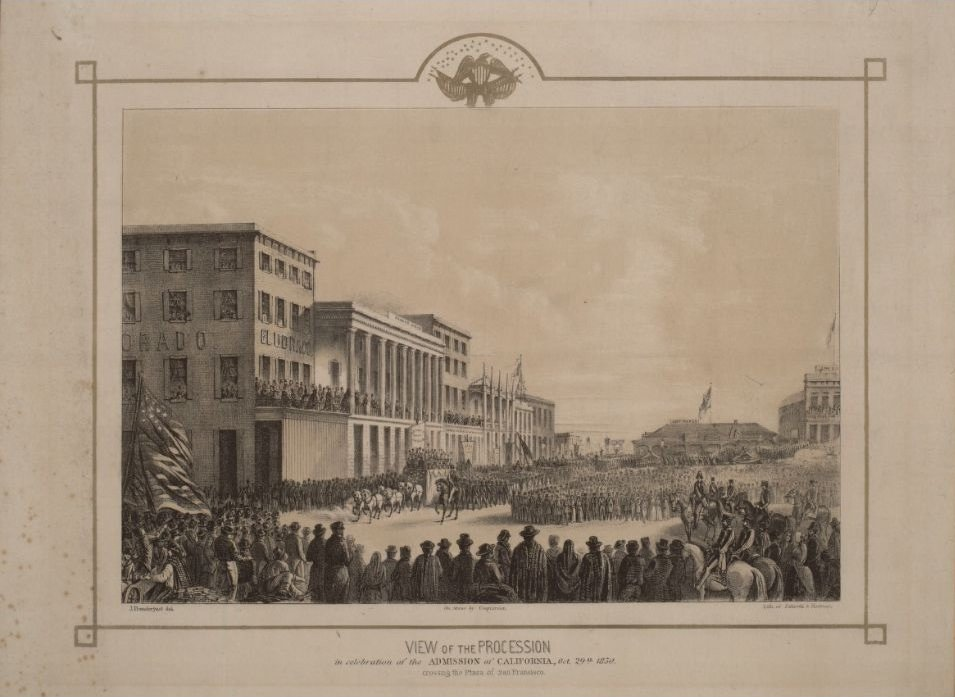
View of the Procession in Celebration of the Admission of California, Oct. 29, 1850, Crossing the Plaza of San Francisco, lithograph by John Prendergast

John Prendergast was a painter who was born in England in about 1815. He sailed from Manila to Honolulu aboard the Spanish brig Flecha, arriving January 14, 1848. On July 15, 1848, he departed Honolulu for San Francisco aboard the Chilean brig Correo de Talcahuano. For four years, he produced numerous drawings and watercolor paintings in California, and then disappeared from the public record. Several lithographs were made from his paintings, the best known being his 1850 Procession at San Francisco in Celebration of the Admission of California.

The Honolulu Museum of Art and the Oakland Museum of California are among the public collections holding works by John Prendergast.
