= Moses Pendergrass =

Moses Pendergrass was the subject of a footnote illustrating mistreatment by government bureaucracy, in a Mark Twain article, "Concerning the Jews", in Harper's Magazine, 1898.

According to Twain's account, in 1886 Moses Pendergrass of Libertyville, Missouri put in a bid to work as a mail carrier for a year beginning on 1 July 1887. "He got the postmaster at Knob Lick to write the letter for him, and while Moses intended that his bid should be $400, his scribe carelessly made it $4." The route was 30 miles every weekday, and he did it on foot. However, due to a clerical error at his local post office, his bid was accepted to work for $4 rather than the intended $400. He discovered the mistake when he received his first paycheck at the end of the first quarter, and immediately contacted the Post Office Department, but found he would have to pay $1459.85 damages to escape the contract. He was therefore forced to work out the year. The route was extended before the year was over so his pay was increased slightly, and in the end he was paid $6.84 for the year rather than $4.

Bills were introduced in "three or four" sessions of Congress to recover the remainder of Pendergrass' rightful salary, and several committees were established to investigate the claim. Regardless, it was eleven years, through six sessions of Congress, before a bill was passed granting him an additional $379.56.

Even after Pendergrass was granted his claim by Congress, he had still received a total of only $386.40, a loss of more than $13 from his rightful contract and, according to Twain, nearly $300 less than he should have earned from the extended route.

Twain's point, in the article's context of criticising anti-Semitism, was to show that "shabbiness and dishonesty are not the monopoly of any race or creed, but are merely human".

"In the present paper I shall allow myself to use the word Jew as if it stood for both religion and race. It is handy; and, besides, that is what the term means to the general world. In the above letter one notes these points:

- 1. The Jew is a well-behaved citizen.
- 2. Can ignorance and fanaticism alone account for his unjust treatment?
- 3. Can Jews do anything to improve the situation?
- 4. The Jews have no party; they are non-participants.
- 5. Will the persecution ever come to an end?
- 6. What has become of the Golden Rule?

"

== See also ==
- Golden Rule
