= James Prendergast =

James Prendergast may refer to:

- James Prendergast (Canadian politician) (1858–1945), judge and politician in western Canada
- James Prendergast (judge) (1826–1921), third Chief Justice of New Zealand
- James F. Prendergast (1917–1985), member of the Pennsylvania House of Representatives
- James Luke Prendergast (1800–1895), merchant and political figure in Newfoundland
- James Prendergast (pioneer) (1764–1846), early Chautauqua County settler, Jamestown, New York was named in his honour
