= Thomas Prendergast (disambiguation) =

Thomas Prendergast (1806–1886) was an East India Company civil servant and writer on language learning.

Thomas Prendergast may also refer to:

- Sir Thomas Prendergast, 1st Baronet (c.1660–1709), Irish politician and soldier
- Sir Thomas Prendergast, 2nd Baronet (died 1760), Irish politician
- Thomas Francis Prendergast (1871–1913), American soldier and Medal of Honor recipient
- Thomas F. Prendergast (railroad executive) (b. 1952/1953), former chairman and CEO of the Metropolitan Transportation Authority in New York

== See also ==
- Tom Prendergast (Laois footballer)
- Tom Prendergast (Kerry footballer)
