= Tom Pendergast (footballer) =

English footballer (1870–1946)

Personal information
- Full name: Thomas Pendergast
- Date of birth: 12 January 1870
- Place of birth: Oswaldtwistle, England
- Date of death: 1946 (aged 76)
- Position: Forward

Senior career*
Years	Team	Apps	(Gls)
1889–1892	Accrington	36	(12)
- * Club domestic league appearances and goals

Thomas Pendergast (12 January 1870 – 1946) was an English footballer who played in the Football League for Accrington.

== Season 1889-90 ==
Thomas Pendergast made his club and League debut as a 19-year-old on 19 October 1889. The match was played at Thorneyholme Road, Accrington and the visitors were Burnley. Pendergast played as a left-sided inside forward. The match ended 2—2. He played 16 of Accrington's 22 League fixtures, all as an Inside Forward and he scored six goals that season. The Lancashire Evening Post of 20 November 1889 made reference to Pendergast's first club and League goal which put Accrington 1–0 up. "Directly afterwards, however, Pendergast drew first blood." The article also states that Pendergast had a shot saved by Jimmy Warner not long after he scored. During the first half Villa had taken a 2–1 lead and it was Pendergast who put them back in front. "The Reds (Accrington) had a fruitless corner, but before long Pendergast scored with a simple shot.

He later played for Accrington Stanley and was a director of that club for many years.

== Statistics ==
Appearances and goals by club, season and competition
Club	Season	League			FA Cup		Total	
Club	Season	Division	Apps	Goals	Apps	Goals	Apps	Goals
Accrington	1889–90	Football League	16	6	-	-	16	6
Accrington	1890–91	Football League	15	3	3	2	18	5
Accrington	1891–92	Football League	5	3	-	-	5	3
