= Puddle, Cornwall =

Hamlet in Cornwall, England

Coordinates: 50.396°N 4.704°W

Puddle
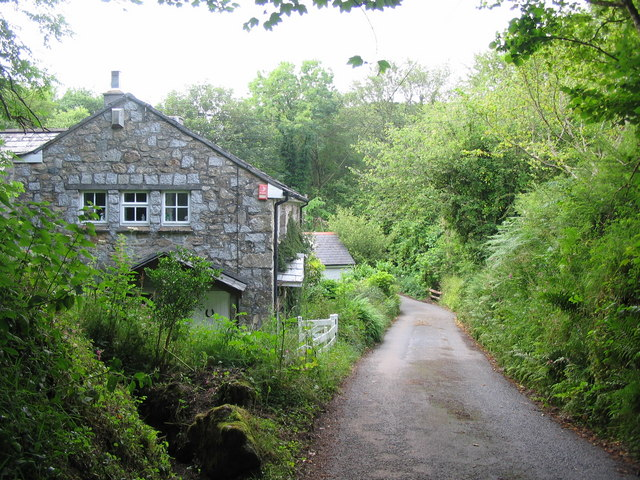
- Puddle

- Location within Cornwall
- OS grid reference: SX079586
- Unitary authority: Cornwall
- Ceremonial county: Cornwall
- Region: South West
- Country: England
- Sovereign state: United Kingdom

Puddle is a hamlet near Lanlivery in mid Cornwall, England, United Kingdom.
