= Pymore, Dorset =

Village in United Kingdom

Coordinates: 50.750°N 2.755°W

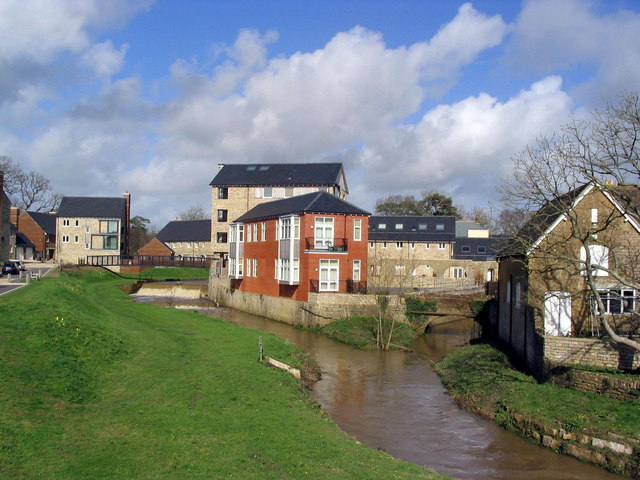
New housing development integrating old industrial buildings at Pymore

Pymore is a small village about one mile north of Bridport, Dorset. Bisected by the river Brit, it used to be part of both Bradpole Parish (area east of the river) and Allington (to the west of the river). Due to local council reorganization, both these parishes were abolished as of 1 April 2024, and the whole of Pymore is now a Ward of Bridport Town Council.

== Possible origins of the name ‘Pymore’ ==
Pymore (Dorset) was mentioned in Domesday Book as ‘land owned by Robert de Pymore’. An alternative etymology of the name, given by the University of Nottingham, is ‘marshy ground infested by gnats or other insects’.

== Industrial history ==
Pymore's industrial heyday was the Victorian era when local entrepreneurs heavily invested in the area to enlarge and modernise their businesses. It flourished as a busy rope-making village. Hemp grown in the district was made into ropes and cords of all kinds, utilizing the River Brit as a water source and for powering the mill. Bridport as a whole was well-known countrywide for its rope-making, including providing all ropes for the British Navy for some time – and the hangman's noose.

With the advent of man-made fibre in the 20th century, the industry first declined, until Pymore Mill finally closed in 1955. People left, and buildings and amenities fell into disrepair. The defunct mill pond was used for punting and ice skating in the winter for a period, but was slowly reclaimed by nature. It is now a reed bed, designated as a Site of Nature Conservation Interest (SNCI).

== Modern Pymore ==
The ownership of the village changed repeatedly in subsequent years; eventually, a pension fund sold off the majority of the site in the 1980s. Various plans were proposed to redevelop the area, including the creation of a working mill and museum or a village consisting solely of weekend homes. But, after initial fierce local resistance, planning permission was granted for a housing development in February 1995.

Prior to the major redevelopment, £1.25 million were spent on flood defences, since the Brit was prone to flooding (the whole of the factories were flooded in about 1975, and another major flood occurred around 2000 while works were still being carried out). The defences are very effective: as soon as the river can no longer be contained by its original bed, the excess water is safely led away onto the bund and under the new bridge into adjacent low-lying fields, so that no houses have been flooded in Pymore since the completion of the work.

The village is now (in 2024) made up of a core of refurbished/converted Victorian buildings with the addition of modern domestic properties which were added in stages. Starting in 1998, with Queenwell, there are now some 100 residential properties, with a few light industrial units remaining on the eastern side, providing employment opportunities.

Some of the older properties - but by no means all - are listed, but the school, for example, a well-known local landmark dating back to 1870, is not. This may be due to the fact that it was built to what seems to have been a very common design – not dissimilar to many chapels of the same era. Historic England has an interesting article on historical school design in England. Pymore School originally had just two classrooms. It closed in 1930 at which time it had 11 pupils. It was converted to a dwelling in the early 2000s.

Hidden away at the back of the Pymore residential area, there is a less obvious local landmark: the mill workers’ privy. This is a Grade II listed 19th century roofed stone bridge over the leat, its seat a wooden plank with a hole in it. Although visible from a public footpath, it was sold with one of the redeveloped cottages and is not open to the public.

Another listed building is the Pymore Inn, a well-established pub on Pymore Road.

The communal areas of the village are now administered and maintained by Pymore Village Management Company. (an elected board of volunteer residents) on behalf of its 78 home-owning shareholders. An annual charge is levied to cover the costs arising.
