= John Prendergast (British Army officer) =

Brigadier John Prendergast DSO MC*
- Born: 15 November 1910; Lahore, British India
- Died: 9 February 2008 (aged 97)
- Military career
- Allegiance: United Kingdom
- Branch: British Indian Army; British Army
- Service years: 1929–1955
- Rank: Brigadier
- Units: 2nd Bn.Royal Sussex Regiment; 1st & 4th Bns.15th Punjab Regiment; Tochi Scouts (Frontier Corps); Irish Guards
- Commands: 1st Western Tribal Legion; 3rd Bn. 6th Rajputana Rifles; 1st Bn. York and Lancaster Regiment
- Conflicts: World War II; Norwegian campaign; Burma campaign
- Awards: Distinguished Service Order; Military Cross and Bar; Mentioned in Dispatches
- Other work: Restoration, travel writer

Brigadier John Hume Prendergast DSO MC & Bar (15 November 1910 – 9 February 2008) was a British Indian Army, and later British Army, officer and travel writer.

== Early life ==
John Hume Prendergast was born in Lahore in 1910, the son of Brigadier General Charles Gordon Prendergast, a British Indian Army officer.

He was educated at Victoria College, Jersey and was commissioned into the Royal Sussex Regiment as a supplementary reserve officer with the rank of second lieutenant with effect from 25 December 1929, when he was described in the London Gazette as "John Hume Prendergast; (late Cadet Corpl., Victoria Coll. Contgt., Jun. Div., O. T. C.)" In 1931, he returned to India and in November 1931 was transferred as a second lieutenant to the Unattached List for the Indian Army. He joined the 4th battalion 15th Punjab Regiment on 22 January 1933, serving with them on the North West Frontier, and was also seconded to the Frontier Corps unit the Tochi Scouts as of 4 August 1936. It was while he was a Lieutenant of the 15th Punjab Regiment attached to the Tochi Scouts that he was awarded his first Military Cross, in 1937. The citation read; "while commanding the advance guard of a regular force column on the frontier. When Pathans attacked from a flanking hillside, he was ordered to clear the way. With sound use of fire and movement, skills in which the Pathan were also adept, he dislodged the enemy."

== World War II ==
=== Norwegian Campaign ===
During World War II Prendergast was flown home in the spring of 1940 to join the Anglo-French landings in Norway as he was an expert in mountain warfare after his time of the North West Frontier. The German Army was already deployed when he arrived and within hours of arrival, he was awarded a Bar to his Military Cross. " Although a mountain warfare adviser to 2nd Battalion Scots Guards, he was in command of a mixed force of British troops and Norwegian reservists at Mosjøen, on the northwest coast. With a line of withdrawal to be kept secure he fought a brisk defensive action, killing 50 of the enemy, before bringing his force to safety with the loss of only one man."

=== India and Burma ===
After the withdrawal of the Anglo-French force from Norway, he returned to India and was the mountain warfare instructor at the Infantry School, in Poona. He remained here until 1941 when he was ordered to raise a battalion-sized force to defend the Indian naval base south of Calcutta. He was then appointed as the Second in Command of the 1/15th Punjab Regiment in the 14th Indian Infantry Division and saw action in the first, Arakan campaign of 1942-43 against the Japanese, 55th Division. After being withdrawn due to illness he rejoined the battalion in time for its advance with the 19th Indian Infantry Division across the Chindwin into the Shwebo plain and the advance on Mandalay. He was then appointed to command the 3rd Btn 6th Rajputana Rifles, of the 19th Indian Infantry Division, in early 1945, he was in command during the final stages of the Burma campaign and the capture of Rangoon.

He was awarded the DSO in the Karen Hills east of Toungoo in central Burma, while commanding his battalion in the fight to halt a Japanese counter-attack astride the Mawchi road which was attempting to the Fourteenth Army's line of communication. He was also mentioned in dispatches for his part in mopping-up operations after the Japanese surrender in August 1945.

== Post war ==
After the independence and Partition of India in 1947, Prendergast transferred from the Indian Army and received a British Army commission into the York and Lancaster Regiment in 1948. He was next appointed as the British defence attaché in Kabul due to his knowledge of the region, with the local rank of colonel.

In 1950 he reverted to the rank of major to join the 1st Battalion, York and Lancasters in Brunswick, Germany and in 1951 was appointed to command the battalion, which at the time was part of a lorried infantry brigade in an armoured division.

In 1952, he was promoted colonel again for a staff appointment at HQ 1st British Corps in Germany. His final appointment in the army was commander of the 147th Brigade of the Territorial Army (TA) based in Leicester.

== Civilian life ==
On his retirement he travelled widely and published the books, The Road to India (1977), a guide to motoring in the sub-continent, Prender’s Progress: A Soldier in India 1931-1947 (1979), a light-hearted autobiography, and a travel memoir A Plume of Dust (1993).

== Promotions ==
- 2nd Lieutenant 15 November 1931
- Lieutenant 15 February 1934
- Captain 15 November 1939
- Acting Major 14 October 1940 – 13 January 1941
- Temporary Major 14 January 1941 - 06.08.1941, 27 August 1941 – 28 March 1942, 06.04.1942 - 05.07.42
- War Substantive Major 6 July 1942
- Major 1 July 1946
- Acting Lieutenant Colonel 03.06.1941 - 06.07.1941, 06.04.1942 - 05.07.42,
- Temporary Lieutenant Colonel 06.07.42 - 16.7.43, 29.05.45 - 28.05.48, 06.07.48 - 3.4.51
- Local Colonel 06.07.48 - 30.12.50
- Lieutenant Colonel 23 October 1951
- Colonel 23 July 1957 (retd 20 August 1960)
- Hon. Brigadier 20 August 1960

== Awards ==
- DSO - London Gazette 6 June 1946
- MC - London Gazette 13 August 1937. NW Frontier of India
- MC - London Gazette 6 August 1940
- MID - London Gazette 9 May 1946
