= Pudsey, Calderdale =

Coordinates: 53.735°N 2.140°W

Pudsey
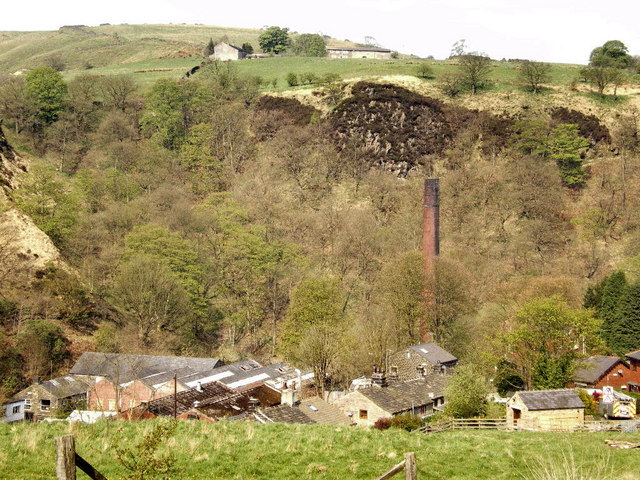
- View from Pudding Lane

- Location within West Yorkshire
- Civil parish: Todmorden
- Metropolitan borough: Calderdale
- Metropolitan county: West Yorkshire
- Region: Yorkshire and the Humber
- Country: England
- Sovereign state: United Kingdom
- Post town: TODMORDEN
- Postcode district: OL14
- Dialling code: 01706
- Police: West Yorkshire
- Fire: West Yorkshire
- Ambulance: Yorkshire
- UK Parliament: Calder Valley

Pudsey is a neighbourhood in the village of Cornholme, in the civil parish of Todmorden, in the Calderdale, in the county of West Yorkshire, England. It is near the town of Todmorden and the A646 Burnley Road.
