= Prestwood, East Staffordshire =

Hamlet in Staffordshire, England

Coordinates: 52.9778°N 1.8502°W

Prestwood
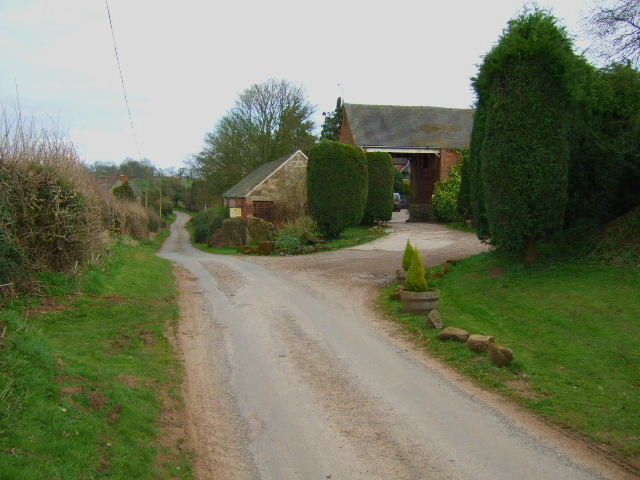

- Location within Staffordshire
- Civil parish: Denstone
- District: East Staffordshire
- Shire county: Staffordshire
- Region: West Midlands
- Country: England
- Sovereign state: United Kingdom

Prestwood is a hamlet and former civil parish, now in the parish of Denstone, in the East Staffordshire district, in the county of Staffordshire, England. In 1931 the parish had a population of 41.

== History ==
The name "Prestwood" means 'Priests' wood'. Prestwood was formerly a township in the parish of Ellastone, from 1866 Prestwood was a civil parish in its own right, on 1 April 1934 the parish was abolished and merged with Denstone.
