= Prendergast, Pembrokeshire =

Village and parish in Pembrokeshire, Wales

Coordinates: 51.81°N 04.96°W

Prendergast
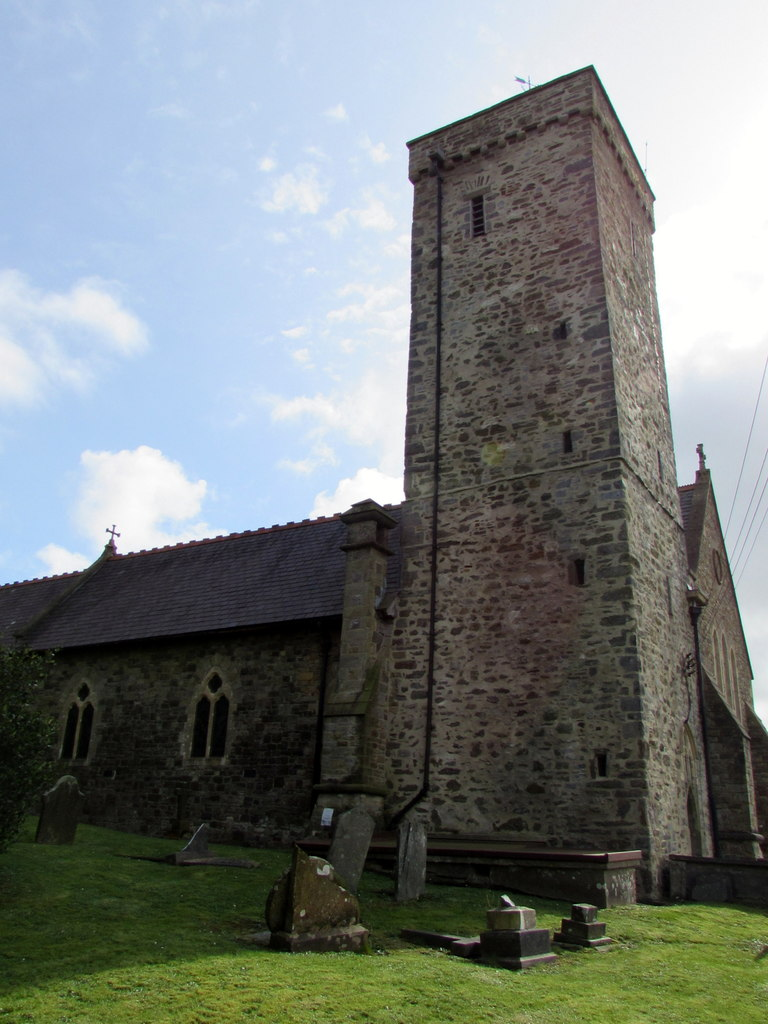
- Medieval tower of St David's Church

- Location within Pembrokeshire
- Community: Haverfordwest
- Principal area: Pembrokeshire
- Country: Wales
- Sovereign state: United Kingdom
- Postcode district: SA
- Police: Dyfed-Powys
- Fire: Mid and West Wales
- Ambulance: Welsh
- UK Parliament: Preseli Pembrokeshire
- Senedd Cymru – Welsh Parliament: Preseli Pembrokeshire

Prendergast is a former village and parish in Pembrokeshire, Wales, now a suburb of Haverfordwest, Pembrokeshire's county town. The name survives as an electoral ward of Haverfordwest. The Western Cleddau forms the parish's western boundary, and the Hiog, a tributary of the Cleddau, the eastern boundary.

== Name ==
The origin of the village's name is possibly linked to a family named Prendergast, whose earliest-known ancestor was Maurice, who was possibly a Cambro-Norman. However it is thought he himself may be named for the town, especially as the surname carries the affix of De. The name could also very likely be Welsh in origin and either poorly rendered from its original form over time, or if originating as a surname; it may have been Anglicised in later records. Examples are a potentially Anglicised form of Bryn y Gest from the Welsh bryn meaning hill and gest, a lenition of cest which means belly or swelling or a deep glen between two mountains having but one opening. It could also come from Pren-dwr-gwest, meaning the inn by the tree near the water. The suffix ast (cf. gast) is possibly of Druidic origin such as the cromlech chamber tomb of Penllech yr Ast meaning the chief slab of the bitch or Llech-yr-ast for Bitch's stone, found in Llangoedmor, Cardiganshire but also Gwâl y Filiast for Lair of the Greyhound Bitch and Carn Nant-yr-ast or Llety'r Filiast or Twlc y Filiast. Alternatively, the name may come from a lost Flemish settlement near Ghent, known as Brontegeest. Pembrokeshire notably had a Flemish population by the twelfth century.

== History ==
=== Parish ===
Prendergast (Prendergest) appears on a 1578 parish map of Pembrokeshire.

The parish, originally placed in the ancient Hundred of Dungleddy by the Laws in Wales Acts 1535-1542, and before that in the pre-Norman cantref of Deugleddyf, was considered a suburb of Haverfordwest as long ago as the mid-19th century, at which time it had 1,105 inhabitants, but was still referred to as a village. In 1872, the parish extended to 1,104 acres (447 ha), and in the 150 years between 1801 and 1951 the population almost doubled from 814 to 1,543. In 1831, agriculture was a minor industry, with most people employed in retail and handicrafts. Under the Parliamentary Boundaries Act 1832, the urban part of Prendergast—33 householders—became part of Haverfordwest.

=== Parish church ===
The parish church of St David is a Grade II listed building, and has many memorials to distinguished local people. It was described in 1833 as "an ancient and venerable structure, in the early style of English architecture, and in good repair", but by 1872 was "in disrepair". It was rebuilt in the late 19th century, but retains its late-mediaeval tower.

=== Chapel ===
A Welsh-speaking Baptist Chapel was established in 1858 to serve north Pembrokeshire people settling in Haverfordwest. Welsh-only services ceased in 1880, and the chapel was enlarged in 1888–91.

=== Prendergast Mill ===
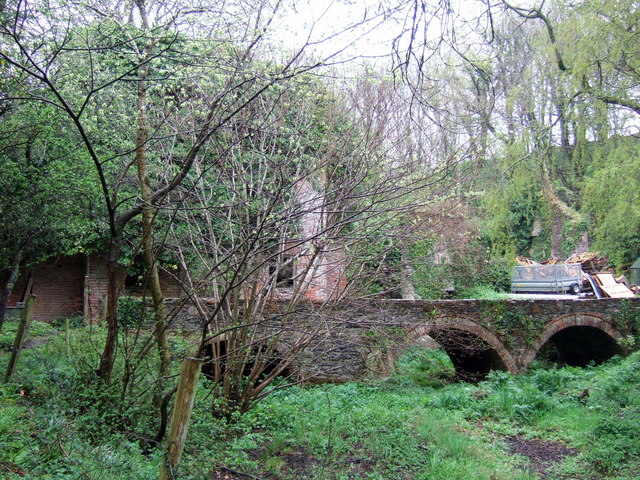
Listed bridge and ruined Prendergast Mill in 2007

About 1786, the 3-storey cotton mill—possibly the only one in south Wales, or at least the largest, with 1,512 spindles—began an industrial complex on the Cleddau River. It was converted to a paper mill in 1816, establishing the paper-making industry in Haverfordwest, but by the end of the century was disused. In ruins by the 20th century, it was partially demolished in 1986. The bridge over the mill race—now no longer running— was constructed in 1812, is a Grade II listed structure and is still in use.

=== Rebecca riots ===
With few turnpike tollgates in Pembrokeshire escaping from the Rebecca rioters of the early 1840s, Prendergast was no exception; on 6 April 1843, about 24 men destroyed the tollgate on the Fishguard road. In the spring of 1844, two men were convicted of unlawful assembly in the previous August, and sentenced to 12 months' imprisonment each.

== Education ==
A primary school was established in the village in 1876. Sir Thomas Picton School was established in 1954, and closed in 2018 as part of a school merger.

== Notable people ==
Maurice de Prendergast was a Norman knight (fl. 1169–1174) who participated in Norman invasion of Ireland, launched from Pembrokeshire. The Stepney family were prominent in Prendergast from the mid-1500s to mid-1700s. Their seat, Prendergast House, was in ruins by the late 18th century.

== Today ==
The present-day parish of Prendergast with Rudbaxton is in the Diocese of St Davids. Prendergast now includes the trading estates of Withybush, and Withybush General Hospital, as well as some new and older residential properties and a school, and is divided approximately north–south by a spur of the main A40 road into Haverfordwest town centre, and northeast–southwest by the B4329 road from Cardigan.

There are several other listed buildings in the parish.
