= Tom Prendergast (Laois footballer) =

Irish Gaelic footballer

Tom "Curley" Prendergast is a former Gaelic footballer with Laois.

His inter-county career spanned 11 years (1976–87), although he missed out in 1985 when he signed off the panel. In 1986 Prendergast was a member of the National Football League title winning squad. Prendergast won an All-Ireland Senior Club Football Championship medal with his club Portlaoise in 1983 and ten Laois Senior Football Championship medals.

It was announced on 26 November 2021 that Tom would be inducted into the Laois GAA Hall of Fame.
