= National Register of Historic Places listings in Pender County, North Carolina =

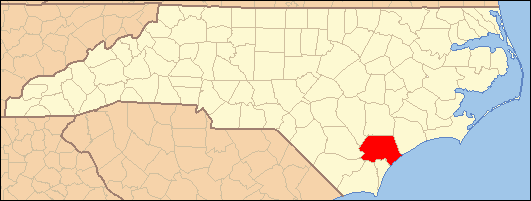

This list includes properties and districts listed on the National Register of Historic Places in Pender County, North Carolina. Click the "Map of all coordinates" link to the right to view an online map of all properties and districts with latitude and longitude coordinates in the table below.

== Current listings ==
This National Park Service list is complete through NPS recent listings posted March 14, 2025.

| | Name on the Register | Image | Date listed | Location | City or town | Description |
|---|---|---|---|---|---|---|
| 1 | Gov. Samuel Ashe Grave | | October 12, 2001 (#01001096) | Farm Ln., from the southern side of NC 1411, 0.7 miles east of its crossing of Pike Creek; 34°28′41″N 77°51′09″W | Rocky Point | |
| 2 | Bannerman House | | May 31, 1974 (#74001365) | Northeast of Burgaw off NC 53 on NC 1520; 34°36′07″N 77°47′26″W | Burgaw | |
| 3 | Beatty-Corbett House | | March 17, 1986 (#86000549) | NC 701 at NC 1200; 34°33′11″N 78°15′09″W | Ivanhoe | |
| 4 | Belvidere Plantation House | | June 14, 1982 (#82003495) | Off NC 1565; 34°23′05″N 77°38′51″W | Hampstead | |
| 5 | Burgaw Depot | Burgaw Depot | July 24, 1986 (#86001910) | 102 E. Fremont; 34°33′00″N 77°55′41″W | Burgaw | |
| 6 | Burgaw Historic District | Burgaw Historic District | August 27, 1999 (#99001047) | Roughly bounded by Cowan St., Fremont St., Dudley St., and Ashe St. 34°33′05″N 77°55′35″W | Burgaw | |
| 7 | Canetuck School | | May 31, 2018 (#100002520) | 6098 Canetuck Rd. 34°24′45″N 78°12′16″W | Currie | |
| 8 | Cape Fear Civil War Shipwreck Discontiguous District | | December 23, 1985 (#85003195) | Address Restricted | Topsail Beach | |
| 9 | Moores Creek National Battlefield | Moores Creek National Battlefield | October 15, 1966 (#66000070) | 25 miles northwest of Wilmington on NC 210; 34°27′27″N 78°06′36″W | Wilmington | Boundary increased on February 13, 1987, the Moore's Creek National Military Park |
| 10 | Pender County Courthouse | Pender County Courthouse | May 10, 1979 (#79001741) | Wright, Wilmington, Walker, and Fremont Sts. 34°33′02″N 77°55′33″W | Burgaw | |
| 11 | Penderlea Homesteads Historic District | Penderlea Homesteads Historic District | September 27, 2013 (#13000803) | Bounded by Sills Creek and Webber, Crooked Run, Lake, Lamb, and Raccoon Rds. 34°39′34″N 78°02′59″W | Willard | |
| 12 | Poplar Grove | Poplar Grove | July 16, 1979 (#79003346) | U.S. Route 17; 34°19′13″N 77°45′55″W | Scotts Hill | |
| 13 | SS. Peter and Paul's Russian Orthodox Greek Catholic Church | SS. Peter and Paul's Russian Orthodox Greek Catholic Church | April 17, 2017 (#100000903) | 2384 Front St. 34°30′53″N 77°54′53″W | St. Helena | |
| 14 | Shelter Neck Historic District | | December 10, 2024 (#100011165) | 3707 Croomsbridge Road; 34°38′36″N 77°51′49″W | Burgaw vicinity | |
| 15 | Sloop Point | | January 20, 1972 (#72000985) | Northeast of Vista off NC 1561; 34°24′58″N 77°35′55″W | Vista | |
| 16 | US Naval Ordnance Testing Facility Assembly Building | US Naval Ordnance Testing Facility Assembly Building | September 14, 1993 (#93000909) | Junction of Channel Boulevard and Flake Ave. 34°22′02″N 77°37′49″W | Topsail Beach | |
| 17 | US Naval Ordnance Testing Facility Control Tower | US Naval Ordnance Testing Facility Control Tower | September 14, 1993 (#93000910) | Southwestern corner of S. Anderson Boulevard and Flake Ave. 34°21′58″N 77°37′45″W | Topsail Beach | |
| 18 | US Naval Ordnance Testing Facility Observation Tower No. 2 | US Naval Ordnance Testing Facility Observation Tower No. 2 | September 14, 1993 (#93000911) | 1000 block of S. Anderson Boulevard; 34°22′53″N 77°36′47″W | Topsail Beach | |

== See also ==
- National Register of Historic Places listings in North Carolina
- List of National Historic Landmarks in North Carolina
