= SAM-N-2 Lark =

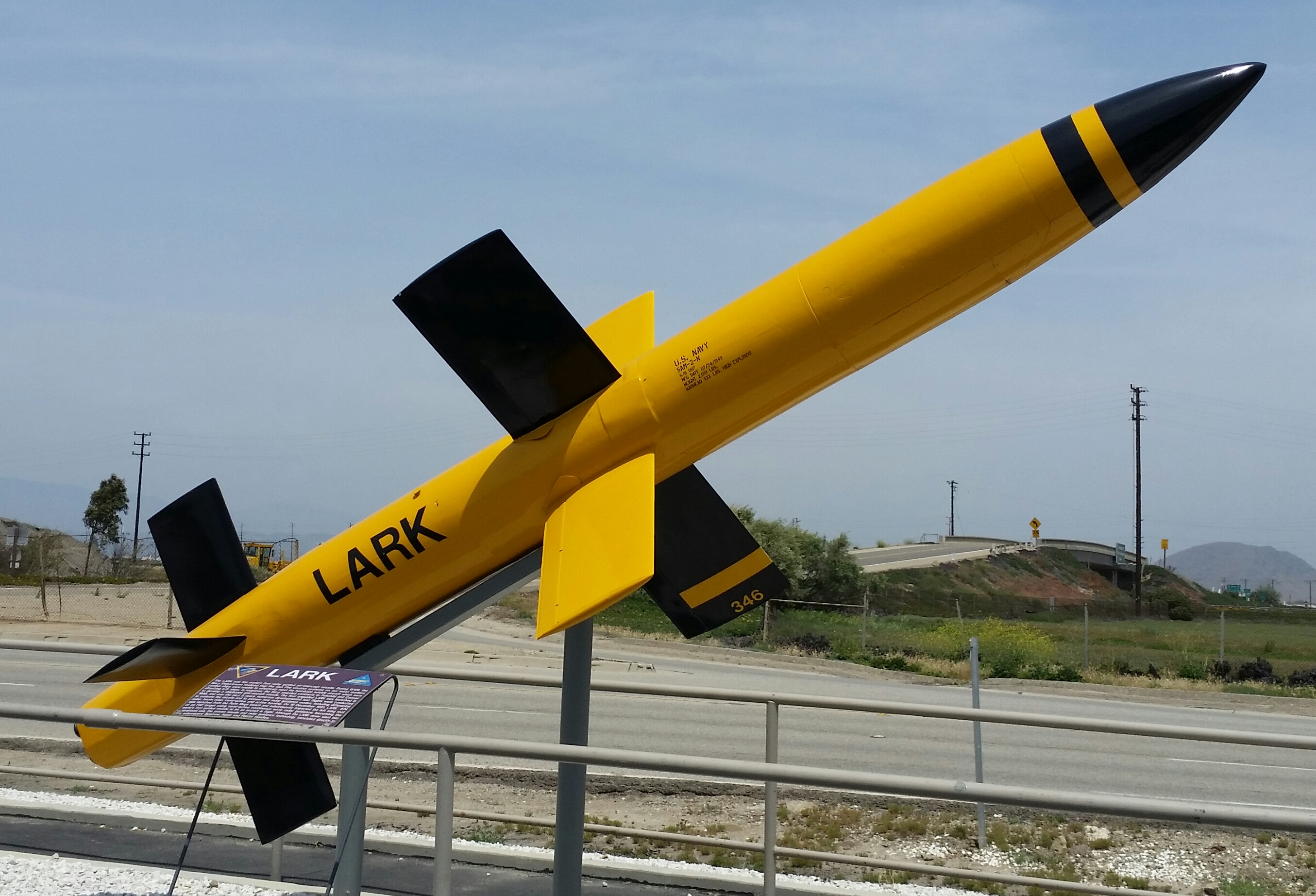
- This SAM-N-2 Lark missile airframe is preserved at the Point Mugu Missile Park near Naval Air Station Point Mugu.
- Type: Surface-to-air missile
- Place of origin: United States

Production history
- Manufacturer: Fairchild Aircraft; Convair; Raytheon
- Produced: 1946-1950

Specifications
- Mass: 920 kilograms (2,030 lb) missile: 550 kilograms (1,210 lb) booster: 370 kilograms (820 lb)
- Length: 18 feet 6 inches (5.64 m) missile: 13 feet 11 inches (4.24 m) booster: 4 feet 7 inches (1.40 m)
- Diameter: 18 inches (46 cm)
- Wingspan: 6 feet 3 inches (1.91 m)
- Warhead: 100 pounds (45 kg) high-explosive warhead
- Detonation mechanism: Proximity fuze
- Engine: Stage 1: solid-fueled rocket booster, Stage 2: liquid-fueled rocket
- Operational range: 55 kilometres (34 mi)
- Maximum speed: Mach 0.85
- Guidance system: Initially radio command
- Launch platform: USS Norton Sound (AVM-1)

The SAM-N-2 Lark project was a solid-fuel boosted, liquid-fueled surface-to-air missile developed by the United States Navy to meet the kamikaze threat. It was developed as a crash program to introduce a medium-range defensive layer that would attack targets between the long-range combat air patrols and short-range anti-aircraft artillery. This produced a design with roughly 30 miles (48 km) maximum range and subsonic performance, suitable for attacks against Japanese aircraft.

With the ending of the war, interest in Lark waned. But critical was the introduction of jet-powered medium bombers that Lark would be incapable of effectively countering. By this time, several hundred Larks had been built to test various guidance systems, and these were mostly expended in various test programs. During one of these, a Convair-built airframe scored the first successful United States surface-to-air missile interception of a flying target in January 1950.

== History ==
=== Concept ===
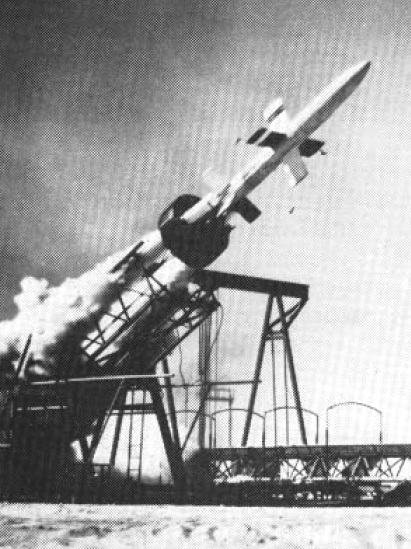
Lark missile launch at NOTS China Lake.

The US Navy and Royal Navy were subjected to successful attacks by German anti-shipping missiles and guided bombs starting in 1943 during their operations in the Allied invasion of Italy. These weapons could be dropped from high altitudes and ranges of several kilometers, allowing the launching aircraft to be kept out of range of the ship's anti-aircraft artillery. After several losses and significant damage from these weapons, both the US and Royal Navies began crash programs to introduce surface-to-air missiles to close this range gap. In the US, this was organized as Operation Bumblebee. In the end, increasing Allied air superiority rendered these weapons moot; during the D-Day invasions, German aircraft were kept well out of range of the Allied fleets.

At roughly the same time, the US Navy began to face the first mass kamikaze attacks. In this case, the attacking aircraft had to collide with its target, so performance and accuracy requirements were reduced. However, the desire to rapidly fill the gap between the short and long-range protection was even more vital. Bumblebee's efforts were aimed at high-performance, supersonic weapons, and as much of the technology was brand new, they could not be expected to enter service in the short term. A new project emerged to introduce a lower-performance weapon as rapidly as possible.

=== Program starts ===
The missile configuration was developed by the Bureau of Aeronautics in January 1945. It consisted of a relatively conventional cylindrical fuselage with a slight boat-tail reduction at the aft, ogive nosecone forward, four wings at the center of the fuselage, and four smaller stabilizers at the rear rotated 45 degrees relative to the wings. Control was by small control surfaces at the aft end of the four wings, similar to ailerons. The missile was powered by a Reaction Motors LR2-RM-2 two-chamber liquid-propellant rocket engine, which was later upgraded to the LR2-RM-6. It was boosted on launch by two bottle-like solid fuel rockets inside a square stabilizer arrangement similar to the German Rheintochter. It was to be armed with a 100 pounds (45 kg) warhead triggered by a radar proximity fuse.

Fairchild Aircraft was given a contract to produce 100 missiles in March 1945. They planned to use command guidance for flight tests, with the intention to add a semi-active radar homing system for production examples. Fairchild referred to the combined guidance system as "Skylark". During the early and mid-range stages of flight, existing ship-based radars would track both the missile and the target, calculating an interception point and sending commands to the missile via radio control. When the missile was 10 miles (16 km) from the target, it would be instructed to turn on its AN/DPN-7 receiver to home on the reflection of the ship's targeting radar.

Concerned about slow progress, Convair was given a contract for another 100 examples in June 1945 under the designation acronym KAY. Their version was overall similar but removed the control surfaces on the wings and made the entire wing rotate instead. Their "Wasp" guidance system used a single radar to track the target, and through most of the flight, the missile would guide itself using beam riding and, during the terminal approach, would switch to its self-contained AN/APN-23 system for active radar homing.

=== War ends ===
The programs were downgraded with the ending of the war, long before flight tests began. The program continued, and flight tests of both the Fairchild KAQ-1 and Convair KAY-1 vehicles started in June 1946. The new rocket engine gave rise to the Fairchild KAQ-2 and Convair KAY-2 around this time. In September 1947, they were redesignated under the Navy's new system, becoming XSAM-2, XSAM-2a for the Fairchild versions, and XSAM-4 and XSAM-4a for Convair. These were redesignated once again, around February 1948, after the introduction of the 1947 tri-service designation system, becoming XSAM-N-2, XSAM-N-2a, XSAM-N-4, and XSAM-N-4a.

Six of the Convair airframes were given to Raytheon to explore the use of velocity-gated continuous wave doppler radar for guided missile target seekers. In contrast, most other United States investigators used range-gated pulse radar. Test launches from prototype ship launchers began in 1950 from the test ship USS Norton Sound. One of these scored the first successful United States surface-to-air missile interception of a flying target in January 1950 and made several more interceptions in the following months.

=== Cancellation ===
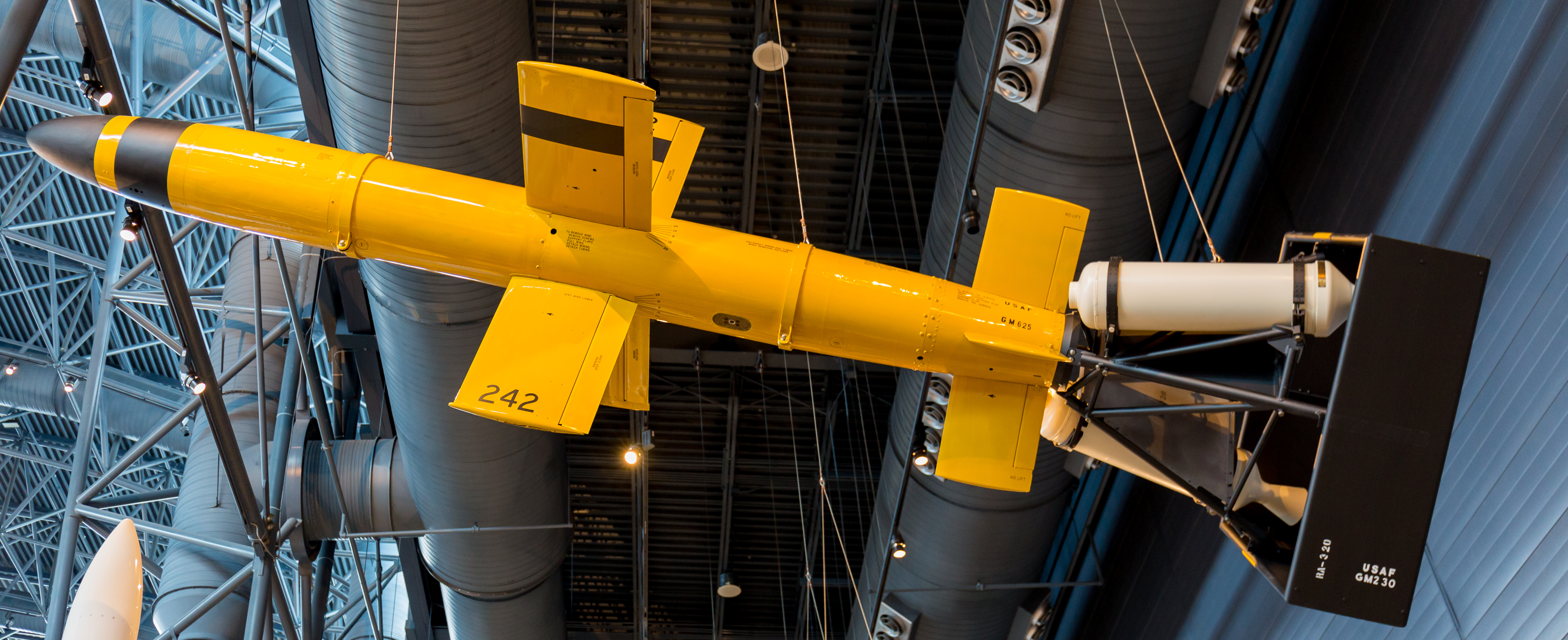
A SAM-N-2 Lark at the Udvar-Hazy Center

As the threat of jet-powered bombers like the Ilyushin Il-28 grew, Lark's subsonic performance was seen as incapable of effectively countering these aircraft—by the time they reached the target, it would have flown a considerable distance and be within weapons-launching range. Lark was canceled in favor of the much higher-performance Bumblebee efforts, notably the RIM-2 Terrier, which had a similar range and size. The fact that Lark was a Bureau of Aeronautics program while Bumblebee was Bureau of Ordnance has also been suggested as a reason for Lark's cancellation.

By this time, the platform had generated significant interest within the US Air Force and US Army. Lark airframes were turned over for testing purposes under the new designations CTV-N-9 for Fairchild models and CTV-N-10 for the Convair version. All three forces continued to use the Lark airframes for testing throughout the 1950s, mainly to develop missile launching and test procedures. The Army redesignated its as the RV-A-22 as the basis for the MGM-18 Lacrosse, which ultimately emerged as a much larger weapon.

The Raytheon guidance system also generated considerable interest. The Bureau of Aeronautics started its Sparrow program in 1950 using the Lark seeker in air-to-air missiles.
