= Helicopter Maritime Strike Weapons School Pacific =

HSM Weapons School Pacific (HSMWSP)
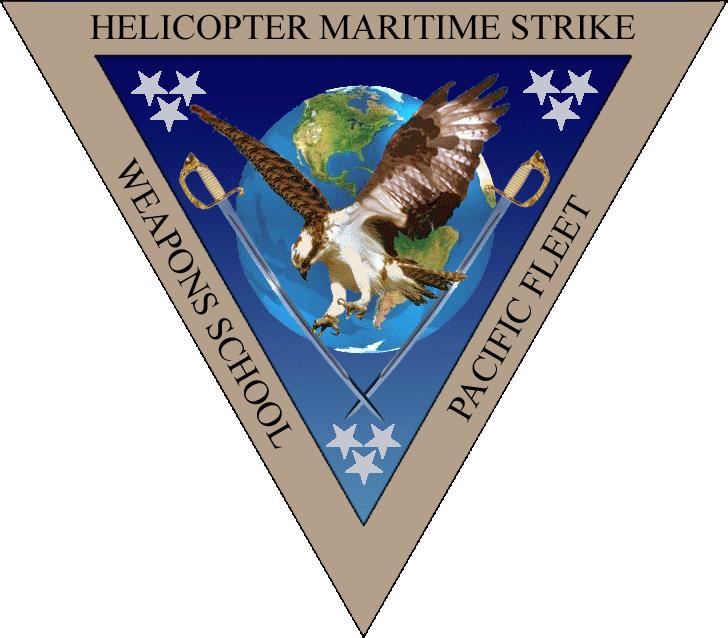
- HSM Weapons School Pacific logo
- Active: May 2005 to present
- Country: United States of America
- Branch: United States Navy
- Type: Navy Helicopter Squadron
- Role: Training
- Garrison/HQ: NAS North Island, Coronado, California
- Nickname: "Honey Badgers"

Helicopter Maritime Strike Weapons School Pacific (HSMWSP) is a United States Navy helicopter training squadron based at NAS North Island, Coronado, California. HSMWSP provides advanced air combat weapons and tactics training and standardization for ten Pacific Fleet HSM squadrons composed of MH-60R and MQ-8B aircraft.

It is part of Helicopter Maritime Strike Wing, Pacific, itself part of Commander Naval Air Force, Pacific (COMNAVAIRPAC).

== Mission ==
Helicopter Maritime Strike Weapons School Pacific provides advanced tactical training and designation programs to increase overall tactical readiness and standardization of HSM aircrews and ordnance technicians. This training provides the foundation necessary to prepare crews for increasingly diverse missions and is achieved through the following programs:

=== Helicopter Advanced Readiness Program (HARP) ===
HARP is a graduate level exercise designed to ensure aircrew are capable of using basic, intermediate, and advanced level tactics to effectively fly and fight the aircraft. It is a four-week course for 24–36 students which combines academic instruction, flight simulator events, tactical flights, and live fire exercises to certify crews for deployment.

=== Air Combat Training Continuum (ACTC) ===
The ACTC program is a progressive pilot and aircrew tactical qualification program that encompasses five levels of technical and tactical knowledge, flight proficiency, and leadership training leading to qualifications. HSMWSP is responsible for providing guidance and assigning responsibilities to all HSM Wing Pacific commands to ensure individual and unit readiness.

=== Conventional Weapons Technical Proficiency Inspection (CWTPI) ===
CWTPI trains and evaluates ordnance load teams on explosive safety, weapon inspections, crew serve weapon maintenance, AN/ALE-47 dispenser magazine build-up, aircraft loading/downloading, arming/de-arming, and aircraft safing procedures.

== History ==
After an initial cadre of Helicopter Anti-submarine Light (HSL) pilots and aircrewmen graduated the Seahawk Weapons and Tactics Instructor (SWTI) course in Fallon, Nevada, they returned to NAS North Island in Coronado, California to form the HSL Weapons and Tactics Unit (WTU). Attached to Commander, Helicopter Anti-Submarine Wing (Light) Pacific, the WTU provided Anti-submarine Warfare (ASW), Anti-surface Warfare (SUW), and Hostile Environment (HE) tactical instruction to the squadrons of the HSL Wing. Expanding on the work of the WTU and preparing for the community transition to the Helicopter Maritime Strike (HSM) mission, the Helicopter Maritime Strike Weapons School Pacific (HSMWSP) was officially established in 2005 as an Echelon V command. Since then, HSMWSP has recruited experienced pilots, helicopter aircrewmen, intelligence analysts, and ordnance technicians and trained them as instructors; who in turn train and evaluate Fleet aircrew and ordnance technicians.

Since 2005, HSMWSP has executed 45 HARPs, ensuring the combat readiness of over 1,000 SH-60B and MH-60R pilots and aircrewmen. Aviation ordnance instructors have to date conducted 209 ordnance inspections and assist visits. Since 2006, the command has also certified West Coast crews in the Airborne Use of Force mission.

From 2008–10, HSMWSP provided over 1,000 hours of flight instruction to Republic of Singapore Navy and Air Force S-70B aircrew.

In 2014, the Weapons School created the inaugural Advanced Readiness Program (ARP) for the MQ-8B Fire Scout unmanned aerial vehicle, providing basic tactical training for the first composite detachment deployments of the MQ-8B.

In June and July 2014, HSMWSP led the HSM Diesel Electric Submarine Initiative exercise (DESI-EX) of 2014. Working with five HSM squadrons, two P-3 squadrons, a destroyer, the Chilean Type 209 class submarine Thompson, and post-mission analysis experts from the Naval Undersea Warfare Center (NUWC), the team produced 100 hours of ASW time and an unprecedented level of tactical feedback and innovation, including research into an HSM requirement for in-cockpit bottom topography. Additionally, the multi-national exercise provided training for 32 crews in advanced counter-diesel ASW; testing their ASW skills against a skilled adversary in a variety of challenging environments.

=== Command history ===
| Commander | Start date | End date |
|---|---|---|
| CDR Michael J. Hammond | May 2005 | July 2006 |
| CDR Andrew Miles | July 2006 | November 2007 |
| CDR Kieran S. Twomey | November 2007 | March 2009 |
| CDR Randall J. Biggs | March 2009 | May 2010 |
| CDR Russ C. Raines | May 2010 | August 2011 |
| CDR Robert R. Kenyon | August 2011 | November 2012 |
| CDR Jonathan B. Baron | November 2012 | March 2014 |
| CDR James F. Hartman | March 2014 | June 2015 |
| CDR Matthew G. Humphrey | June 2015 | September 2016 |
| CDR Jonathan L. Baron | September 2016 | December 2017 |
| CDR Christopher M. Conlon | December 2017 | March 2019 |
| CDR Mark J. Miller | March 2019 | June 2020 |
| CDR Steven L. Dobesh | June 2020 | September 2021 |
| CDR Devon M. Hockaday | September 2021 | October 2022 |
| CDR Kevin K. Shikuma | October 2022 | February 2024 |
| CDR Robert M. Belflower | February 2024 | May 2025 |
| CDR Christopher M. Schnappinger | May 2025 | August 2026 |

=== Squadron aircraft ===
SH-60 Seahawk

- SH-60B, 2005–15
- MH-60R, 2005–Present

MQ-8 Fire Scout

- MQ-8B , 2014–Present

== See also ==
- History of the United States Navy
- US Navy Helicopter Squadrons
- SH-60 Seahawk
