= Fertilaid =

Fertilaid as Fertilizer (production ended in 1992) Fertilaid, was one of the first organically certified fertilizers acknowledged by the California Certification of Organics, in 1979. A nationwide process for certification did not begin to exist in the United States until 1990 per the National Organic Food Act. Previous to that, Fertilaid was awarded, in January 1954, its first Patent Office Citation.

This product was developed by John C. Porter, Sr., (b. 1909 – d. 2008), with his wife Fedil C. Porter (b._) at his side. Mr. Porter, who was a visionary agronomist and soil chemist, made products based on the philosophy that one works with nature, not against it; therefore, since soil is naturally made, it should be healed by understanding nature's processes and then assisted and supported with naturally made products. As far back as the 1950s, the Porters stood openly and publicly against the excessive use of chemical fertilizers and pesticides derived from petrochemicals.

Long years of research yielded a comprehensive program that demonstrated the ability to enhance the soil's fertility while improving crop yields without cost to the environment. Fertilaid research reports from Texas A&M University, other leading universities and colleges, as well as documented research projects conducted by the Rockefeller Foundation, Tracor, the National Coffee Commission, Eli Lilly and Company and others; time and time again announced Fertilaid's superior crop growth and fruit quality.

Fertilaid came in various formulations specifically tailored for production of fruits and vegetables, root crops such as carrots and potatoes, floriculture, lawn/garden/house plants, and turf grass applications. It was a proven bio-organic catalyst that improves plant and fruit quality in virtually any soil condition.

FertiGro, created by Mr. Porter's son, John V. Porter (b.) who worked for the family business since he was a boy, was a blended array of Fertilaid and other nutrients. This formulation helped the plant more efficiently utilize chemical nutrients, and was used for cereal grains, broad-leaf vegetables and commercial turf grass. FertiGro also came as a folliculor spray that was less expensive for large-scale applications, has reduced volatiles into the atmosphere, and was proven to not leach into the water table.

Fertilaid products were manufactured in facilities in South Texas, Central Texas, the Gulf Coast of Texas, and in the state of Louisiana - but utilized all around the world.

March 16, 1973, The Austin Citizen newspaper wrote that Fertiliad, "… will result in sweeping changes to the growing systems of the smallest gardener to the largest farmer. Lush greens on harsh desert, hard clay, or alkaline soils and the sudden halt to some serious agricultural problems – namely compaction, excess salinity and deletion of necessary humus – have caused a great deal of command about the remarkable Fertilaid Organic Activator."

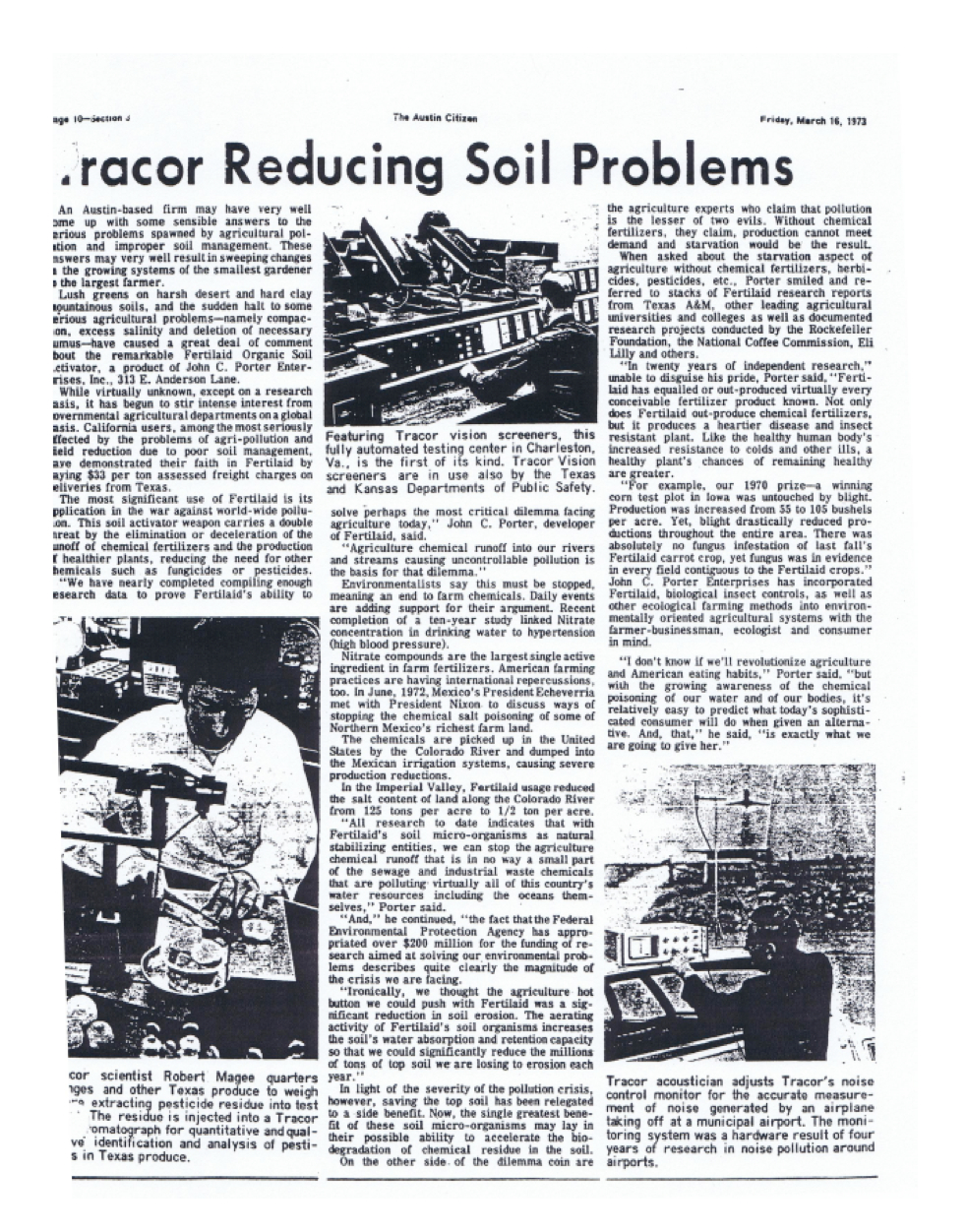
Austinpaper

Production of Fertilaid ended in 1992, due to an attempted hostile takeover.
