= US Naval Ordnance Testing Facility Assembly Building =

Historic building in North Carolina, United States

- U.S. National Register of Historic Places
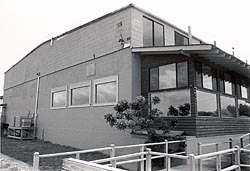
- US Naval Ordnance Testing Facility Assembly Building

- Location within North Carolina Location within the United States
- Location: Jct. Of Channel Blvd. and Flake Ave., Topsail Beach, North Carolina
- Coordinates: 34°22′2″N 77°37′49″W
- Area: less than one acre
- Built: 1946
- Built by: Kellex Corporation; George & Lynch
- MPS: US Naval Ordnance Test Facilities, Topsail Island MPS
- NRHP reference No.: 93000909
- Added to NRHP: September 14, 1993

US Naval Ordnance Testing Facility Assembly Building is a historic building located at Topsail Island, Pender County, North Carolina. It was built in 1946 by Kellex Corporation, and is a 1 1/2-story, reinforced concrete and concrete block building. It measures 75 feet by 82 feet and has a low-pitched, gable-front roof. The building was abandoned by the military in 1948 and subsequently used for commercial and recreational purposes. It was erected for the purpose of fabricating and storing missiles used in "Operation Bumblebee."

It was listed on the National Register of Historic Places in 1993.
