= US Naval Ordnance Testing Facility Observation Tower No. 2 =

- U.S. National Register of Historic Places
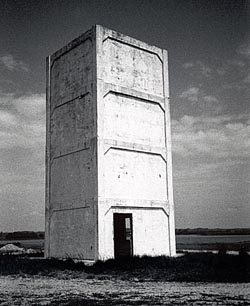
- US Naval Ordnance Testing Facility Observation Tower No. 2

- Location within North Carolina Location within the United States
- Location: 1000 blk. S. Anderson Blvd., Topsail Beach, North Carolina
- Coordinates: 34°22′53″N 77°36′47″W
- Area: less than one acre
- Built: 1946
- Built by: Kellex Corporation; George & Lynch
- MPS: US Naval Ordnance Test Facilities, Topsail Island MPS
- NRHP reference No.: 93000911
- Added to NRHP: September 14, 1993

US Naval Ordnance Testing Facility Observation Tower No. 2, also known as Queen's Grant Tower, is a historic building located at Topsail Island, Pender County, North Carolina. It was built in 1946 by Kellex Corporation, and is a reinforced concrete structure. The interior stairs have been removed. It was one of seven observation towers built to house carefully calibrated monitoring equipment for "Operation Bumblebee."

It was listed on the National Register of Historic Places in 1993.
