= US Naval Ordnance Testing Facility Control Tower =

- U.S. National Register of Historic Places
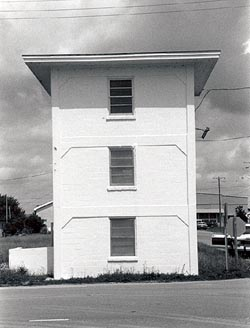
- US Naval Ordnance Testing Facility Control Tower

- Location within North Carolina Location within the United States
- Location: SW corner of S. Anderson Blvd. and Flake Ave., Topsail Beach, North Carolina
- Coordinates: 34°21′58″N 77°37′45″W
- Area: less than one acre
- Built: 1946
- Built by: Kellex Corporation; George & Lynch
- MPS: US Naval Ordnance Test Facilities, Topsail Island MPS
- NRHP reference No.: 93000910
- Added to NRHP: September 14, 1993

US Naval Ordnance Testing Facility Control Tower is a historic building located at Topsail Island, Pender County, North Carolina. It was built in 1946 by Kellex Corporation, and is a reinforced concrete frame measuring 16 feet by 16 feet and 30 feet high. The building was purchased for civilian purposes in 1957 and a flat roof replaced a formerly open platform on the top level. It was erected to serve as commend headquarters for "Operation Bumblebee."

It was listed on the National Register of Historic Places in 1993.
