= Vitro Corporation =

United States defense contractor

- Formerly: Vitro Manufacturing Company (1950-1968); Vitro Engineering Corp. (1968-1993); Tracor Systems Technologies (1993-1999)
- Founded: 1950; 75 years ago
- Defunct: 1999
- Fate: Merged into BAE Systems Inc.
- Parent: Automation Industries Inc (1968-1978); GK Technologies (1978-1993); Tracor (1993-1998); GEC plc (1998-1999)

Vitro Corporation was a major United States defense contractor which became part of BAE Systems Inc. in 1999.

== History ==
Vitro was incorporated in 1950 as the Vitro Manufacturing Company. Its main product was slide transparencies for overhead projectors. For some time prior to incorporation, the founders had produced tinted lighting gels for the theater and stage industry, and were known for their leadership in the production of gels used to replicate the lighting characteristics of the outdoors on a sunny day. These gels had this quality because of the admixture of salts of uranium, which are bright yellow. This business had positioned Vitro as a ready source of uranium during US military and scientific research efforts into nuclear energy during the Second World War. It seems likely that the confidential relationships developed in this time-frame with US government entities led to later contracting and development business arrangements.

In 1950 Vitro acquired the Kellex Corporation, a company involved in the development of the nuclear bomb. In 1953 the company reorganised as the Vitro Corporation of America. One of Vitro's earliest customers was the United States Navy, a relationship which continued into the 1990s.

In 1968 Vitro was acquired by Automation Industries Inc and renamed Vitro Engineering Corp. In 1978 Automation Industries and its Vitro subsidiary were acquired by General Cable Corp, which renamed the new company GK Technologies. In 1981 GK Technologies (including Vitro) was acquired by the Penn Central Corporation. Penn Central had emerged from bankruptcy without its failing rail businesses (acquired by the Federal government) and diversified into defense and other businesses. By the early 1990s Penn Central had begun to focus on financial services and in 1992 announced it was divesting Vitro. In 1993 Tracor completed its purchased of Vitro for $94 million. The Vitro acquisition almost doubled the size of Tracor. Vitro merged with Tracor Applied Sciences to form Tracor Systems Technologies, Tracor's largest subsidiary.

In July 1998 the British electronics conglomerate GEC plc purchased Tracor. In November 1999 GEC merged its defense arm (including Tracor) with British Aerospace to form BAE Systems.
