= Topsail Beach, North Carolina =

- Town
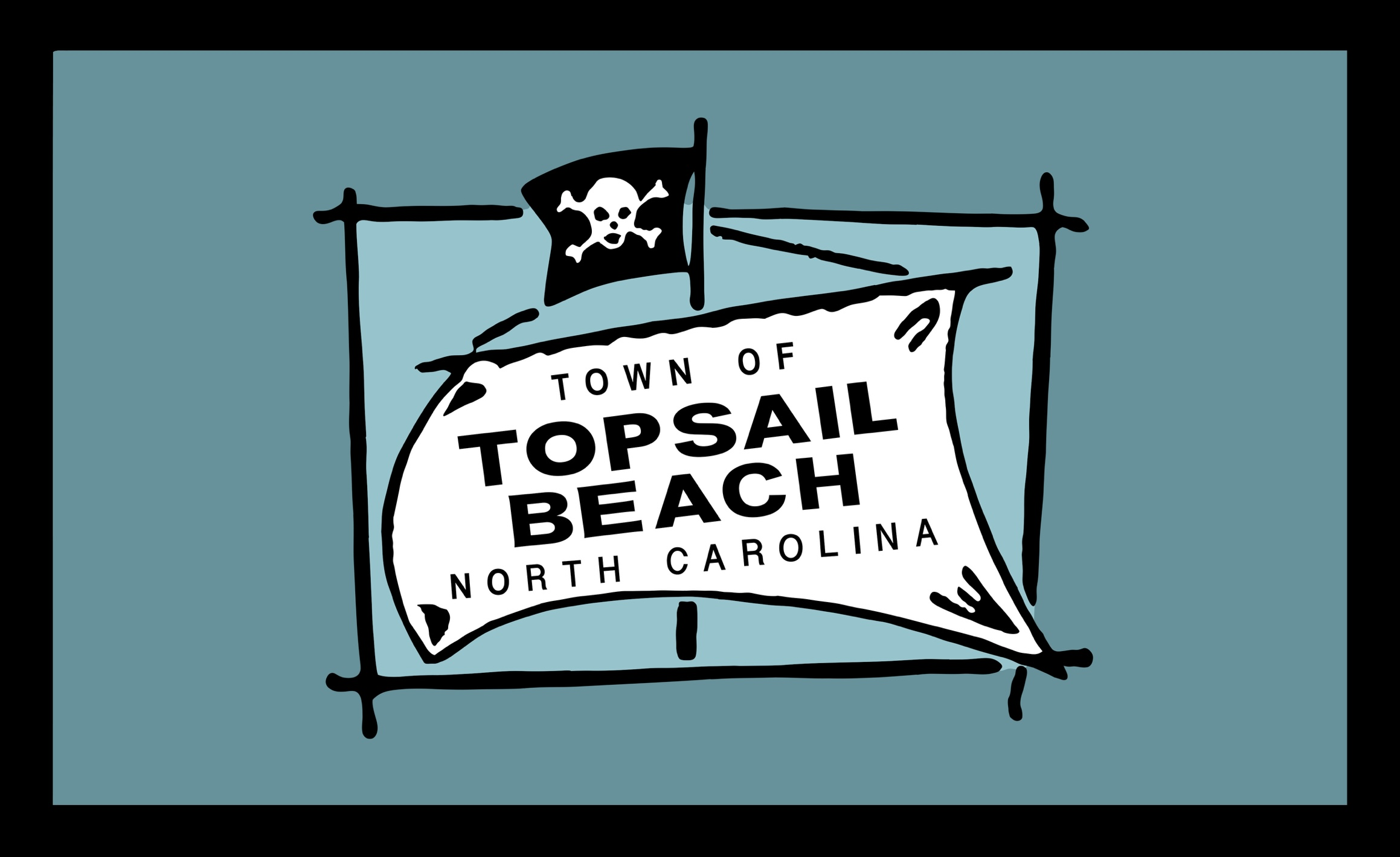
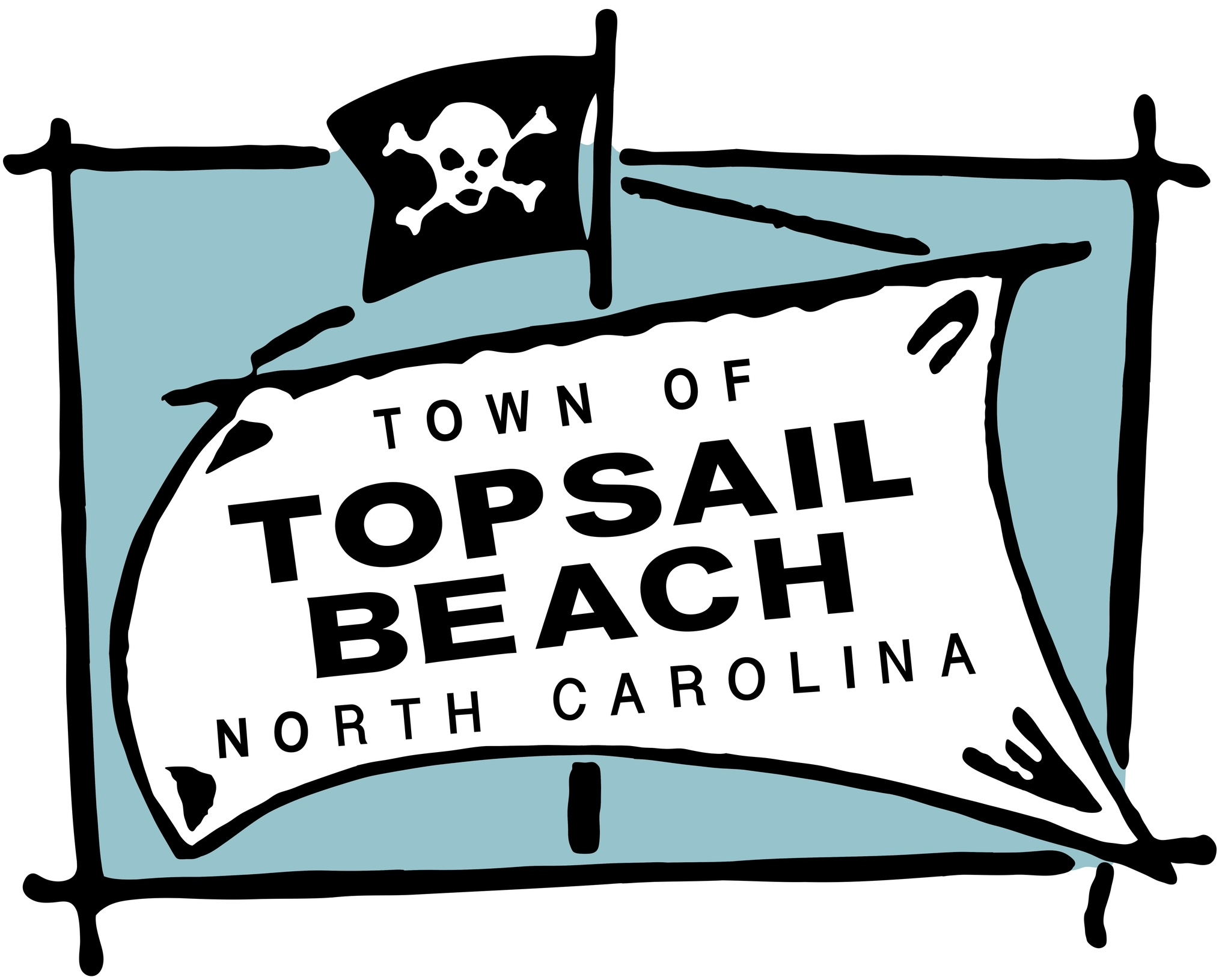
- Flag Seal

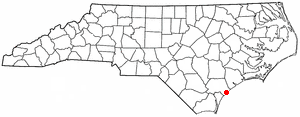
- Location of Topsail Beach, North Carolina
- Coordinates: 34°22′48″N 77°37′57″W
- Country: United States
- State: North Carolina
- County: Pender

Area
  - Total: 5.88 sq mi (15.23 km^{2})
  - Land: 4.39 sq mi (11.37 km^{2})
  - Water: 1.49 sq mi (3.86 km^{2})
- Elevation: 0 ft (0 m)

Population (2020)
  - Total: 461
  - Density: 105.0/sq mi (40.54/km^{2})
- Time zone: UTC-5 (Eastern (EST))
  - Summer (DST): UTC-4 (EDT)
- FIPS code: 37-68040
- GNIS feature ID: 2406743
- Website: https://topsailbeachnc.gov/

Topsail Beach is a town in Pender County, North Carolina, United States. As of the 2020 census, Topsail Beach had a population of 461. It is part of the Wilmington, NC Metropolitan Statistical Area.

== History ==
Local folklore claims the name, Topsail (pronounced Tops’l), originated during the 1700s when pirate ships, including Blackbeard, roamed the coastal waters. Historians explain that marauding pirates hid their ships in the channel behind the island and waited for passing merchant ships loaded with goods. The pirates would pursue and attack the merchants, claiming the cargoes as their own. Eventually, the merchants became aware of this infamous hiding place and began to watch for the tops of the pirates' sails showing over the rolling dunes - hence the name Topsail Island.

Prior to World War II, the only access to Topsail Island was by boat. Area residents frequently made this short trip to picnic and search for the pirate Blackbeard's rumored buried treasure.

During World War II, the U.S. Navy took over the island and began a joint venture with Johns Hopkins University known as Operation Bumblebee. The waterway was dredged, roads were built, and fresh water was piped onto the island. Operation Bumblebee was the beginning of the space program for the United States Government. An arsenal center for the assembly and storage of rockets was built on the sound side of the island, and launching pads were constructed on the oceanfront. Concrete observation towers were built throughout the island to monitor the experimental launchings. Over 200 rocket launchings took place on the island between 1946 and 1948. When the testing program was dismantled, the government sold the island to the public. The Town of Topsail Beach was incorporated in 1963. Many of the original military structures still exist today, and several of the concrete observation towers have since been converted into private residences and places of business.

The Cape Fear Civil War Shipwreck Discontiguous District, US Naval Ordnance Testing Facility Assembly Building, US Naval Ordnance Testing Facility Control Tower, and US Naval Ordnance Testing Facility Observation Tower No. 2 are listed on the National Register of Historic Places.

== Recreation ==
Missiles and More Museum: The Missiles and More Museum is housed in the Historical Assembly Building located at 720 Channel Blvd in Topsail Beach. The Museum is home to exhibits such as Pirates of the Carolinas, Operation Bumblebee, Camp Davis, The Towns of Topsail Island, Topsail's Natural Beauty and Fragility, Traces of Native Americans on the Island, and an International Shell Exhibit. On April 4, 2011, the WASP (Women's Air-force Service Pilots) The exhibit was opened. This exhibit tells the story of the first women trained to fly American military aircraft.

== Geography ==
According to the United States Census Bureau, the town has a total area of 5.8 square miles (15 km^{2}), of which 4.4 square miles (11.3 km^{2}) is land and 1.5 square miles (3.9 km^{2}) (25.30%) is water.Topsail Beach is located on the southern portion of Topsail Island, part of North Carolina’s barrier island system. Barrier islands along the Atlantic coast were formed through long-term sediment deposition influenced by ocean currents and tidal patterns. The coastline near Topsail Beach is shaped by wave action, seasonal storms, and periodic erosion.

Like other barrier island communities in North Carolina, the town experiences shoreline changes due to hurricanes and tropical systems. Coastal management efforts, including beach nourishment projects, have been implemented to stabilize portions of the shoreline. These efforts are designed to reduce erosion and protect infrastructure while maintaining the natural character of the coastline.

It is the southernmost town on Topsail Island.

== Demographics ==
Historical population
Census	Pop.	Note	%±
1970	108		—
1980	264		144.4%
1990	346		31.1%
2000	471		36.1%
2010	368		−21.9%
2020	461		25.3%
U.S. Decennial Census

=== 2020 census ===
Topsail Beach racial composition
Race	Number	Percentage
White (non-Hispanic)	444	96.31%
Asian	5	1.08%
Other/Mixed	4	0.87%
Hispanic or Latino	8	1.74%

As of the 2020 United States census, there were 461 people, 202 households, and 131 families residing in the town.

=== 2000 census ===
As of the census of 2000, there were 471 people, 252 households, and 159 families residing in the town. The population density was 107.7 inhabitants per square mile (41.6/km^{2}). There were 1,149 housing units at an average density of 262.8 per square mile (101.5/km^{2}). The racial makeup of the town was 99.36% White, 0.21% Native American, 0.21% Asian, 0.21% from other races. Hispanic or Latino of any race were 0.42% of the population.

There were 252 households, out of which 9.5% had children under the age of 18 living with them, 58.3% were married couples living together, 2.0% had a female householder with no husband present, and 36.9% were non-families. 31.7% of all households were made up of individuals, and 10.7% had someone living alone who was 65 years of age or older. The average household size was 1.87 and the average family size was 2.26.

In the town, the population was spread out, with 7.0% under the age of 18, 4.5% from 18 to 24, 17.6% from 25 to 44, 44.2% from 45 to 64, and 26.8% who were 65 years of age or older. The median age was 56 years. For every 100 females, there were 99.6 males. For every 100 females age 18 and over, there were 102.8 males.

The average income for a household in the town is $55,750, and the median income for a family was $64,167. Males had a median income of $45,313 versus $25,139 for females. The per capita income for the town was $35,838. About 0.8% of families and 6.7% of the population were below the poverty line, including 3.8% of those under age 18 and none of those age 65 or over.

Preceded by Surf City	Beaches of Southeastern North Carolina	Succeeded by Lea-Hutaff Island
