= Samuel Ashe (North Carolina governor) =

American politician (1725–1813)

9th Governor of North Carolina
- In office November 19, 1795 – December 7, 1798
- Preceded by: Richard Dobbs Spaight, Sr.
- Succeeded by: William Richardson Davie

Personal details
- Born: March 24, 1725 Beaufort, Province of North Carolina, British America
- Died: February 3, 1813 (aged 87) Rocky Point, North Carolina, U.S.
- Party: Democratic-Republican
- Spouse(s): (1) Mary Porter Ashe (married 1748; later died) (2) Elizabeth Merrik Ashe
- Children: 3
- Occupation: Lawyer

Samuel Ashe (March 24, 1725 – February 3, 1813) was the ninth governor of the U.S. state of North Carolina from 1795 to 1798. He was also one of the first three judges of the North Carolina Superior Court in 1787.

== Life story ==
Ashe was born in Beaufort in the Province of North Carolina. His father, John Baptista Ashe, and brother, John Ashe, both served as Speaker of the North Carolina Assembly, or House of Burgesses. Ashe became an orphan at the age of nine. He married Mary Porter in 1748; they had three children, including John Baptista Ashe, who would serve in the Continental Congress. After Mary died, Ashe remarried, this time to Elizabeth Merrik.

Ashe studied law and was named Assistant Attorney for the Crown in the Wilmington district of the colony.

An active supporter of independence, he became involved in the revolutionary movement and served in the North Carolina Provincial Congress and as a member of the North Carolina militia. For a little more than one month in 1776, Ashe served as president of the Council of Safety, the state's executive authority. He was also appointed to the committee that drafted the first Constitution of North Carolina. In 1776, he was elected to the new North Carolina Senate and was elected its first speaker. The following year, Ashe was appointed presiding judge of the state Superior Court, a post he held until 1795.

During the American Revolution, Ashe served as lieutenant and paymaster of the 1st North Carolina Continental Regiment from September 1775 until he resigned on April 16, 1776. He later served as a captain of the First Troop of North Carolina Continental Dragoon Regiment from March 1777 until the regiment was disbanded on January 1, 1779.

In 1795, the General Assembly elected him governor at 70. He served three one-year terms, the maximum constitutional limit, before retiring in 1798. Ashe was active in politics after his term as governor, serving as a member of the United States Electoral College in 1804, when his fellow Democrat-Republican, Thomas Jefferson, was reelected over Federalist Charles C. Pinckney.

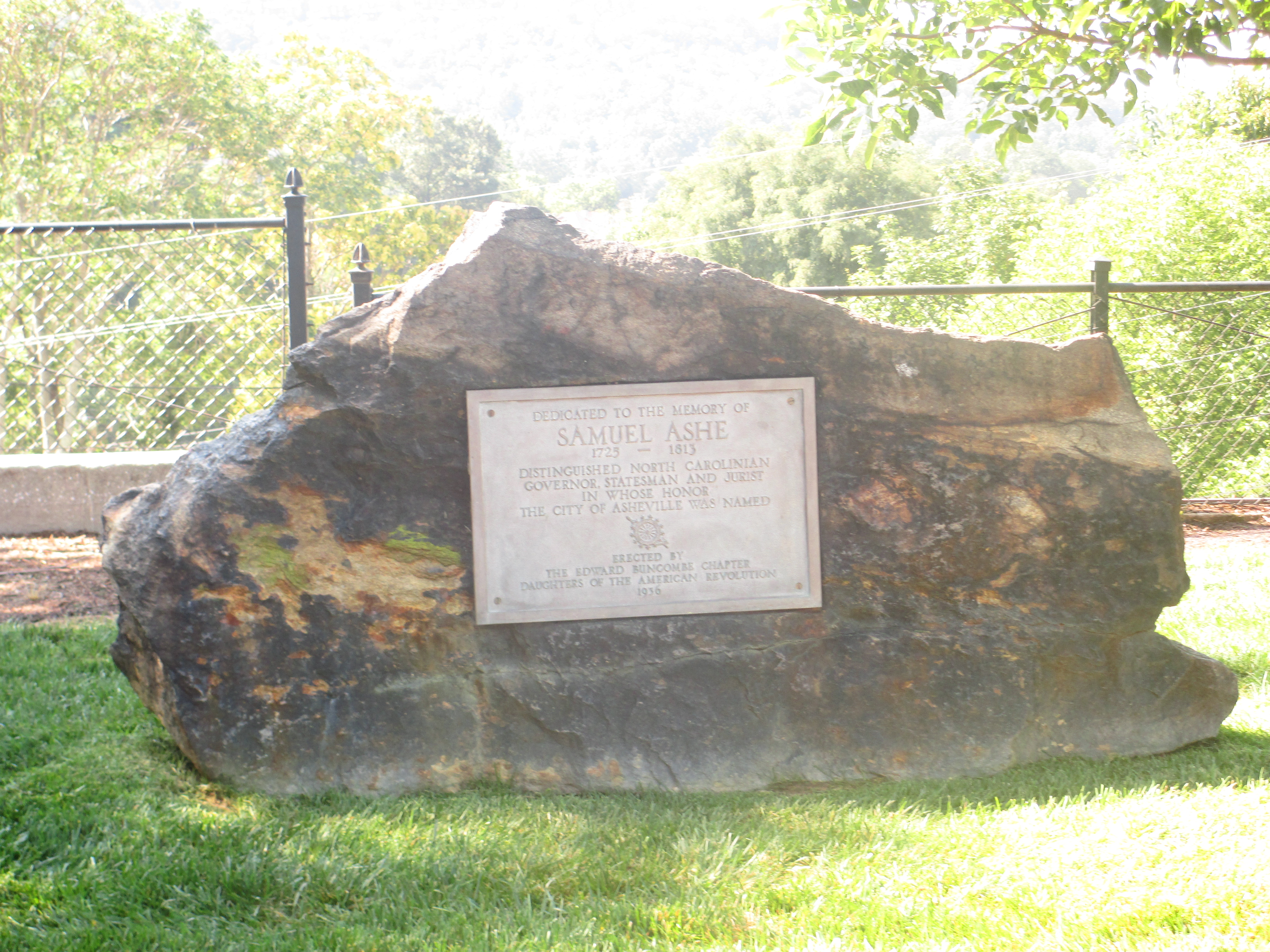
Ashe marker in his namesake Asheville, North Carolina

== Namesakes and family ==
Ashe County and the cities of Asheville and Asheboro in North Carolina are named in his honor.

Ashe enslaved people, including a West African woman named Amar, who was kidnapped and brought to America in 1735 aboard a ship called The Doddington. Legendary tennis player Arthur Ashe was a direct descendant of Amar.

In World War II, the United States Liberty ship SS Samuel Ashe was named in his honor.

Ashe's grandson, William Ashe, was a Confederate soldier in the American Civil War and a son of John B. and Eliza Hay. He was killed at Shiloh in Tennessee in 1862, a battle in which William's brother, Samuel Swann Ashe, also fought.

The Gov. Samuel Ashe Grave near Rocky Point, North Carolina was listed on the National Register of Historic Places in 2001.

== Sources ==
- Biographical Directory of the Governors of the United States, 1789–1978, Robert Sobel and John Raimo, eds. Westport, CT: Meckler Books, 1978. (ISBN 0-930466-00-4)
- North Carolina Government 1585–1979, A narrative and statistical history, Thad Eure-Secretary of State, North Carolina Department of Secretary of State-Raleigh, North Carolina.

Political offices
Preceded by Cornelius Harnett	President of the North Carolina Council of Safety; 1776	Succeeded by Willie Jones
Preceded by Richard Dobbs Spaight	Governor of North Carolina; 1795 – 1798	Succeeded by William Richardson Davie
