= Crash program =

Plan to solve an urgent problem

A crash program is a plan of action entailing rapid, intensive resource allocation to solve a pressing problem. Rapidity may eliminate investigation and planning essential to efficient use of resources when goals are perceived as more important than those resources.

== Etymology ==
The use of "crash" as a modifier meaning "undertaken rapidly or urgently" traces to "crash dive," the emergency rapid-submersion maneuver developed for submarines in the 1920s. The submarine crash dive required normal procedures to be compressed or bypassed, establishing a semantic association between "crash" and urgent, accelerated action.

The term "crash program" emerged in American military and scientific circles during World War II to describe expedited production of urgently needed equipment. Documentary evidence places the term in use by late 1940, when the U.S. Army Signal Corps Laboratories built eighteen SCR-268 radar sets on what was described as a "crash" basis, bypassing normal procurement channels. The term appeared frequently at MIT's Radiation Laboratory beginning in 1941, where the services would place "crash production" orders for hand-built, prototype radar sets ahead of mass manufacturing.

By 1944, the Office of Scientific Research and Development formalized "crash procurement" as an administrative category, also known as the "Red Ticket Program," defining it as "a small quantity production of an item which is urgently needed in the field and which can be completed or deliveries started several months in advance of the date when the manufacturer can commence production line deliveries." The practice was most extensively applied to radar and rocket programs, where OSRD undertook limited manufacturing runs because standard military procurement procedures could not deliver new equipment quickly enough for operational needs.

== Deadlines ==
Time limits differentiate crash programs from normal procedures. Time reduction often results from unexpected circumstances. These time limits may originate from predictable events like weather cycles or financial deadlines, or they may be arbitrarily established as lifesaving measures in situations involving famine, disease, or military vulnerabilities. Schedule compression occurs when deadlines appropriate for expected conditions are shortened while the program is in progress.

== Methods ==
Fast-tracking involves working simultaneously on activities that would have been performed sequentially under normal circumstances. Project crashing occurs when additional resources are required to meet the established deadline. Project crashing increases the cost of the goal. Crash analysis compares the costs of shortened deadlines.

== Examples ==
- First transcontinental railroad
- Liberty ship
- MIT Radiation Laboratory
- Manhattan Project
- Operation Bumblebee
- Space Race
- UGM-27 Polaris
- COVID-19 vaccine
