= RIM-8 Talos =

U.S. Navy surface-to-air missile (1955–1979)

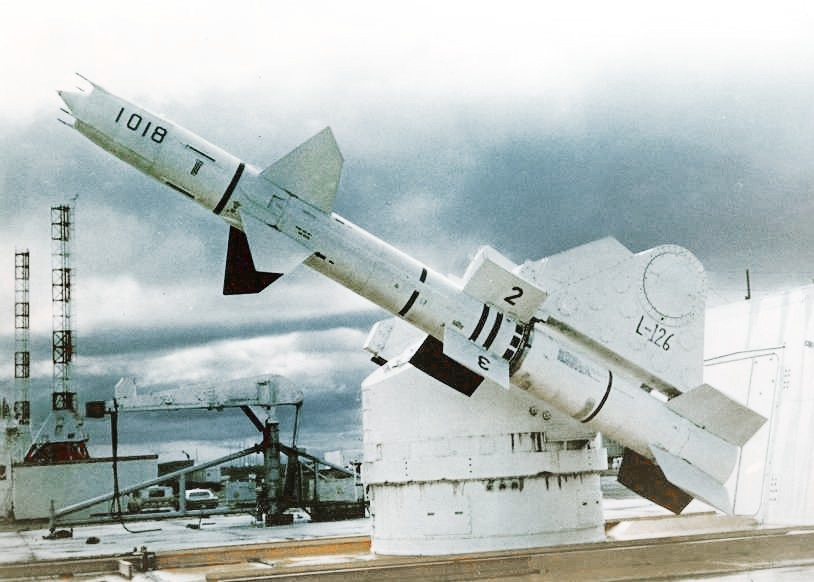
- RIM-8G Talos missile
- Type: Surface-to-air missile
- Place of origin: United States

Service history
- In service: 1958-1979
- Used by: United States Navy

Production history
- Manufacturer: Bendix
- Produced: 1955

Specifications
- Mass: 7,800 lb (3,500 kg) (missile: 3,400 lb (1,500 kg), booster: 4,400 lb (2,000 kg))
- Length: 32 ft (9.8 m)
- Diameter: 28 in (71 cm)
- Wingspan: 280 cm (110 in)
- Warhead: 211 kg (465 lb) continuous-rod HE warhead or W30 nuclear warhead (2–5 kt)
- Engine: Stage 1: Hercules MK 11 solid-fueled rocket booster, Stage 2: Bendix ramjet sustainer 20,053lbf, 89.20kN
- Operational range: RIM-8A: 92 km (50 nm); RIM-8J: 241 km (130 nm)
- Flight ceiling: 24,400 m (80,100 ft)
- Maximum speed: Mach 3 (3704 km/h)
- Guidance system: Radar beam riding and (non-nuclear variants) semi-active radar homing
- Launch platform: Surface ship

Bendix RIM-8 Talos was a long-range naval surface-to-air missile (SAM), among the earliest SAMs to equip United States Navy ships. The Talos used radar beam riding for guidance to the vicinity of its target, and semi-active radar homing (SARH) for terminal guidance. The four antennas surrounding the nose were SARH receivers, which functioned as a continuous wave interferometer. A solid rocket booster provided thrust for launch and a Bendix ramjet powered its flight to the target, with the warhead serving as the ramjet's compressor.

== History ==
Ready Now And Ready For Tomorrow (1968) de-classified US Navy naval anti-aircraft missile warfare promotional film reel.

Talos was the end product of Operation Bumblebee, the Navy's 16-year surface-to-air missile development program for protection against guided anti-ship missiles like Henschel Hs 293 glide bombs, Fritz X, and kamikaze aircraft. The Talos was the primary effort behind the Bumblebee project but was not the first missile the program developed; the RIM-2 Terrier was the first to enter service. The Talos was originally designated SAM-N-6 and was redesignated RIM-8 in 1963. The airframe was manufactured by McDonnell Aircraft in St. Louis; final assembly was by Bendix Missile Systems in Mishawaka, Indiana. The first production versions of the missile cost about $155,000 in 1955 ($1,793,335 in 2022 dollars); however, the price would drop as Bendix increased production.

The initial SAM-N-6b/RIM-8A had an effective range of about 50 nmi and a conventional warhead. The SAM-N-6bW/RIM-8B was a RIM-8A with a nuclear warhead; terminal guidance was judged unnecessary for a nuclear warhead, so the SARH antenna was omitted. The SAM-N-6b1/RIM-8C was introduced in 1960 and had double the range and a more effective conventional continuous-rod warhead. The RIM-8D was the nuclear-warhead version of the -8C. The SAM-N-6c/RIM-8E "Unified Talos" had a warhead that could be swapped while embarked, eliminating the need to waste magazine capacity carrying dedicated nuclear-tipped variants. The RIM-8E also carried an improved continuous-wave terminal homing seeker and had a higher ceiling reach-out. Some RIM-8Cs were retrofitted with the new seeker and designated RIM-8F. The RIM-8G and RIM-8J had further radar homing improvements and a new fuel that extended the range to 130 nm.

The surface-to-air versions also saw action in Vietnam, with a total of four MiGs being shot down by USS Chicago and Long Beach. On May 23, 1968, a Talos fired from Long Beach shot down a Vietnamese MiG at a range of about 65 miles. This was the first downing of a hostile aircraft by a missile fired from a ship. The hit also destroyed a second MiG which flew through the debris. In September 1968, Long Beach scored another MiG destroyed at a range of 61 miles. On May 9, 1972, Chicago's forward Talos battery scored a long-range kill on a MiG. The Talos missile also had surface-to-surface capabilities.

The RGM-8H Talos-ARM was a dedicated anti-radar homing missile for use against shore-based radar stations. Initial testing of the RGM-8H was performed in 1965, and soon after, it was deployed in Vietnam on Chicago, Oklahoma City, and Long Beach, attacking North Vietnamese SAM radars. Oklahoma City fired the first successful RGM-8H combat shot in US Navy history in early 1972. It was also the first combat surface-to-surface missile shot in US Navy history.

== Specific installations ==
The Talos saw relatively limited use due to its large size and dual radar antenna system; few ships could accommodate the large missiles with the AN/SPW-2 missile guidance radar and the AN/SPG-49 target illumination and tracking radar. The 9.9-meter-long, 3½-ton missile was comparable in size to a small fighter aircraft (Note: The contemporary Soviet MiG-15 jet fighter was 10.1 meters long and weighed 5 tons.) and required 24 men to assemble its wings and fins.

The Mark 7 Guided Missile Launching System (GMLS) was installed in an aft mount on the three Galveston-class cruisers (converted Cleveland-class light cruisers). Its missiles were stored in a deckhouse divided into three parts, consisting of a pair of wing and fin assembly areas at the rear near the launcher (one for each launcher rail), a ready-service magazine for 16 assembled but finless missiles in the middle, and up to 30 missiles and boosters in a storage area at the front.

The Mark 12 Guided Missile Launching System (GMLS) was installed fore and aft on the three Albany-class cruisers (converted Baltimore-class heavy cruisers), as well as on the rear of the nuclear-powered USS Long Beach. The launcher was similar in its structure and components, as was the wing and fin assembly area, however its missile storage was reworked into a below-deck magazine with 52 assembled but finless missiles loaded on "trays" with a pair of vertical rails for lifting them out into a small checkout area, from which they were transferred horizontally into final assembly.

== Variants ==
SAM-N-6
Development and prototype missiles; pre-1962 US Navy designation of the Talos missile.
SAM-N-6a
Development and prototype missiles; pre-1962 US Navy designation of the Talos missile.
SAM-N-6b
Production missiles deployed with conventional explosive warheads; redesignated RIM-8A.
SAM-N-6bw
The -6b missile with a nuclear warhead, omitting terminal guidance and SARH antennas; redesignated RIM-8B.
SAM-N-6b1
An improved -6b with much greater range and continuous rod conventional warhead; redesignated RIM-8C.
SAM-N-6c
"Unified Talos" with interchangeable nuclear/conventional warheads eliminating the need for storage of both missile types, also fitted with improved terminal homing and higher operating ceiling; redesignated RIM-8E.
RIM-8F Talos
Some RIM-8C missiles retrofitted with the new seeker from the RIM-8E (post-1962 only).
RIM-8G Talos
Variant with further homing improvements.
RGM-8H Talos-ARM
A dedicated surface-to-surface anti-radar homing version for deployment on ships already fitted out for the Talos SAM.
RIM-8J Talos
Variant with further homing improvements.
MQM-8G Vandal
Talos missiles remaining after removal from active service were converted to super-sonic drone targets, with the inventory being exhausted circa 2008.

== Chronology ==
Date	Fleet inventory	Ship	Event
28 May 1958	1 × Mk 7 GMLS; 2 × AN/SPG-49 RADAR	Galveston	Commissioned as CLG-3
3 June 1960	2 × Mk 7 GMLS; 4 × AN/SPG-49 RADAR	Little Rock	Commissioned as CLG-4
7 September 1960	3 × Mk 7 GMLS; 6 × AN/SPG-49 RADAR	Oklahoma City	Commissioned as CLG-5
9 September 1961	3 × Mk 7 GMLS; 1 × Mk 12 GMLS; 8 × AN/SPG-49 RADAR	Long Beach	Commissioned as CGN-9
3 November 1962	3 × Mk 7 GMLS; 3 × Mk 12 GMLS; 12 × AN/SPG-49 RADAR	Albany	Commissioned as CG-10
1 December 1962	3 × Mk 7 GMLS; 5 × Mk 12 GMLS; 16 × AN/SPG-49 RADAR	Columbus	Commissioned as CG-12
2 May 1964	3 × Mk 7 GMLS; 7 × Mk 12 GMLS; 20 × AN/SPG-49 RADAR	Chicago	Commissioned as CG-11
25 May 1970	2 × Mk 7 GMLS; 7 × Mk 12 GMLS; 18 × AN/SPG-49 RADAR	Galveston	Decommissioned
31 January 1975	2 × Mk 7 GMLS; 5 × Mk 12 GMLS; 14 × AN/SPG-49 RADAR	Columbus	Decommissioned
22 November 1976	1 × Mk 7 GMLS; 5 × Mk 12 GMLS; 12 × AN/SPG-49 RADAR	Little Rock	Decommissioned
1978	1 × Mk 7 GMLS; 4 × Mk 12 GMLS; 10 × AN/SPG-49 RADAR	Long Beach	Talos system removed
1 November 1979	4 × Mk 12 GMLS; 8 × AN/SPG-49 RADAR	Oklahoma City	Last Talos fired
15 December 1979	4 × Mk 12 GMLS; 8 × AN/SPG-49 RADAR	Oklahoma City	Decommissioned
1 March 1980	2 × Mk 12 GMLS; 4 × AN/SPG-49 RADAR	Chicago	Decommissioned
29 August 1980		Albany	Decommissioned

== Fate ==
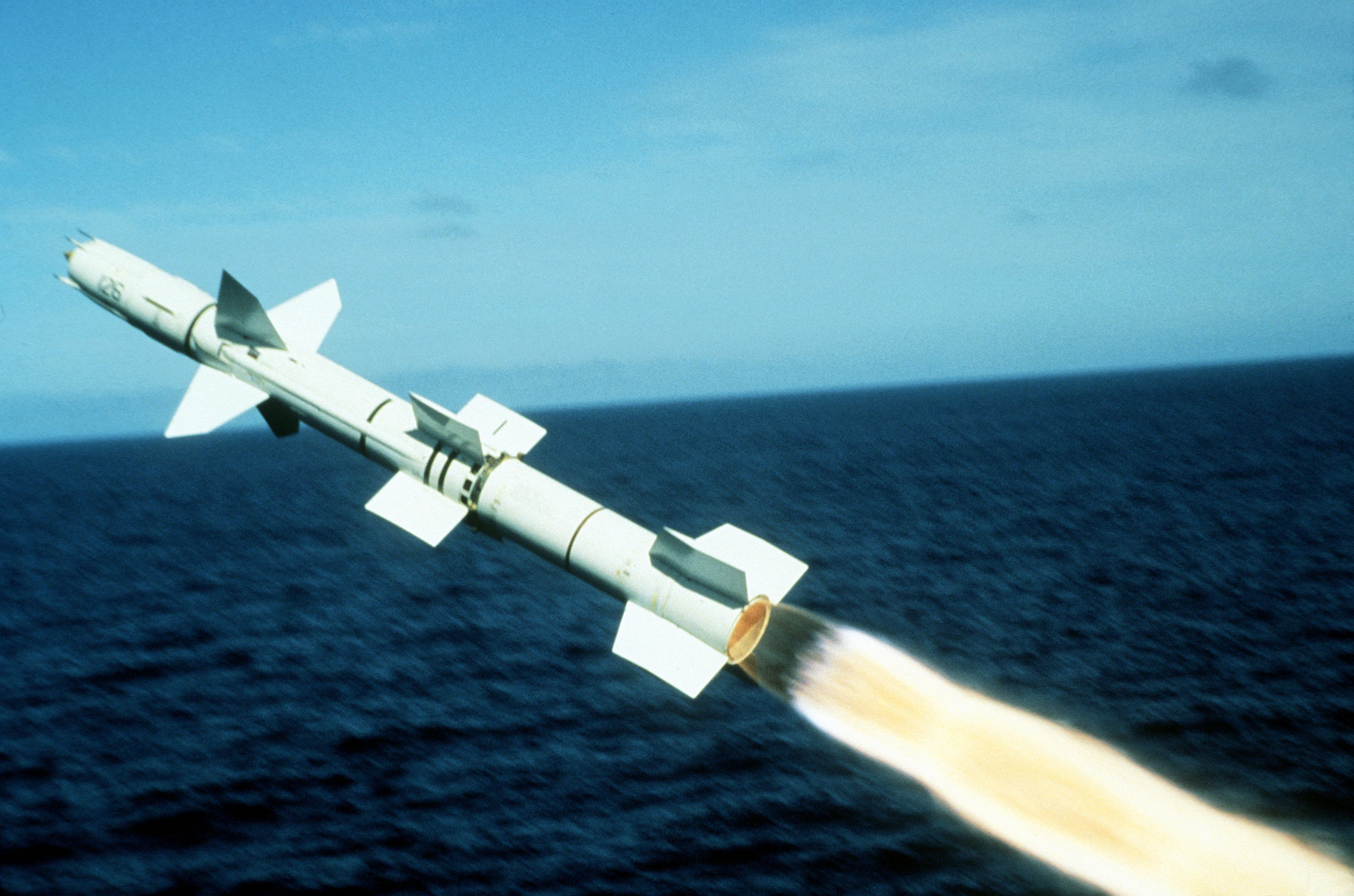
Last Talos missile launched by USS Oklahoma City in 1979.

Long Beach had her Talos launcher removed in 1978. Talos was phased out of fleet service with the decommissioning of USS Oklahoma City in 1979, though the Albany-class ships carrying the system soldiered on a few more years with the launchers left in place until they were retired in 1980. After 21 years of fleet service, the missile was replaced by the RIM-67 Standard missile, which was fired from the smaller Mk10 launcher.

Two Talos missiles are on display at the Military Honor Park located near the entrance of the South Bend International Airport in South Bend, Indiana.

A Talos missile was displayed in the atrium of the South Bend Regional Airport (historically known as Bendix Field), but was removed in 2021 to be displayed in the Manufacturing Victory exhibit at The History Museum in South Bend. After the exhibit closed, the missile did not return to the airport.

Another example can be seen at the Patriots Point Naval & Maritime Museum, located at Mount Pleasant, South Carolina.

A Talos Missile can also be seen on display at the Muskogee War Memorial Park located in Muskogee, Oklahoma.

A Talos missile is on display at Naval Weapons Station Yorktown in Yorktown, Virginia.

A Talos missile is on display at The US Navy's Guided Missile School at Dam Neck, in Virginia Beach, Virginia, just outside of the main building of the NAVGMSCOL.

Two Talos missiles are on display, in launch position, on the stern of USS Little Rock at the Buffalo and Erie County Naval & Military Park located in Buffalo, New York.

A Talos missile and booster were on display at Rita Blanca Park (home of the XIT Rodeo & Reunion) in Dalhart, Texas, at least from 1981 or earlier, but as of 2017 had been removed.

A Talos missile is on display in the Steven F. Udvar-Hazy Center at the Washington Dulles International Airport.

A Talos missile is on outdoor display in front of the Missiles and More Museum on Topsail Island, NC. Notably, this location is also the birthplace of the RIM-8 Talos missile, having been a result of the research effort on ramjets and surface-to-air missiles which took place on Topsail Island from 1946 to 1948, as part of Operation Bumblebee.

== Gallery ==
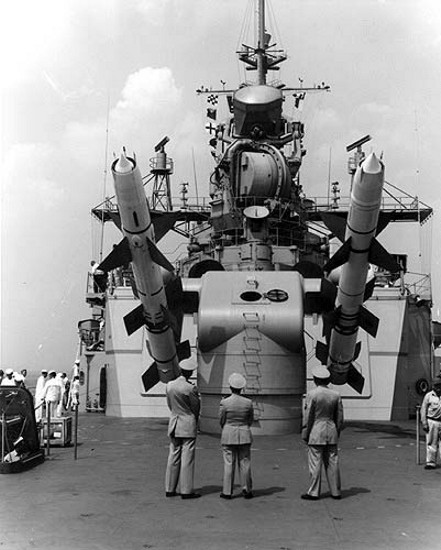
Talos missile launcher on USS Long Beach, July 1961

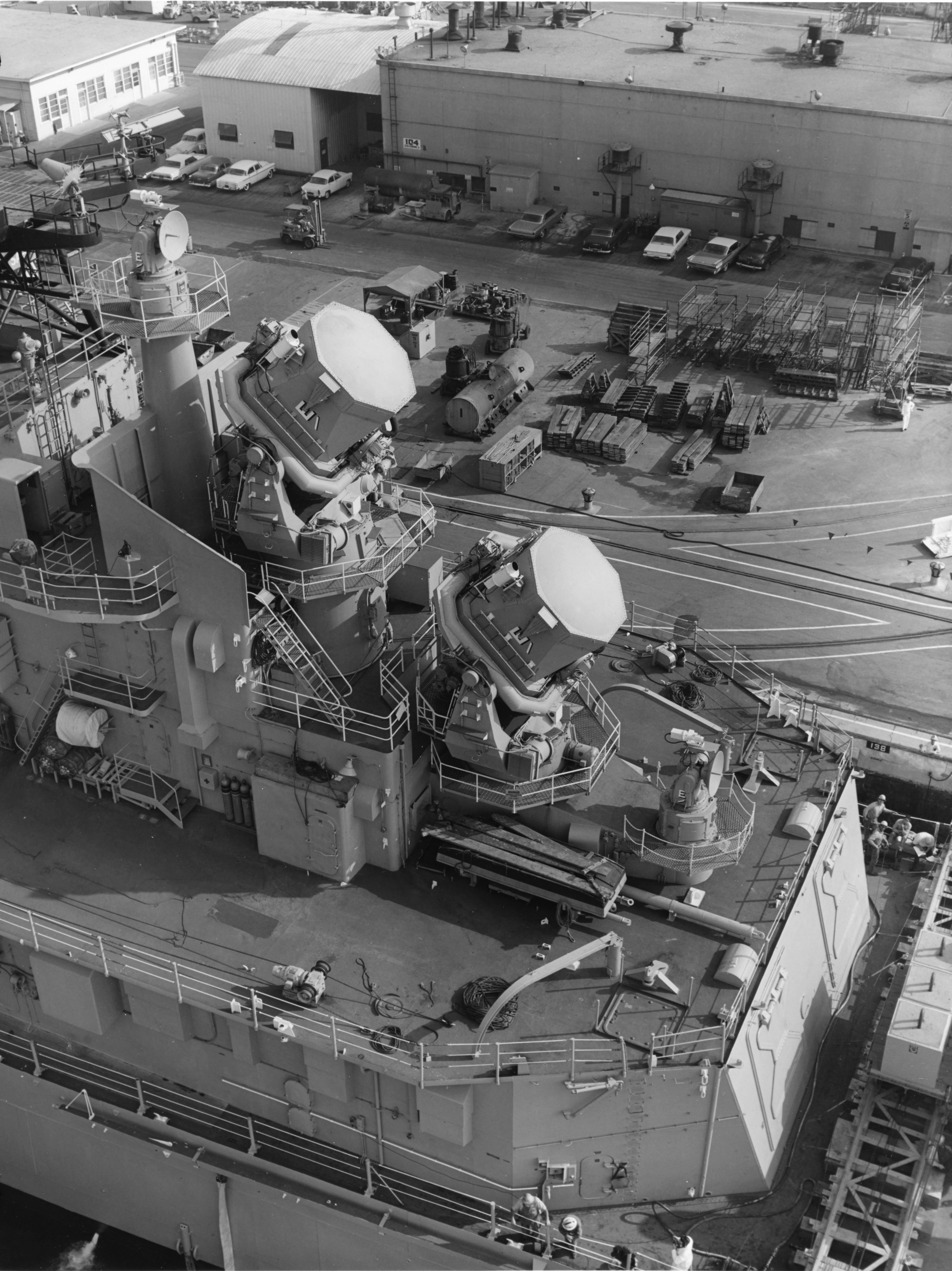
Talos missile guidance radars, AN/SPG-49.

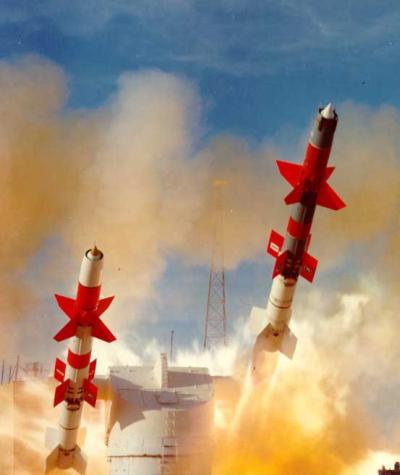
RIM-8A and -8B missile launch.

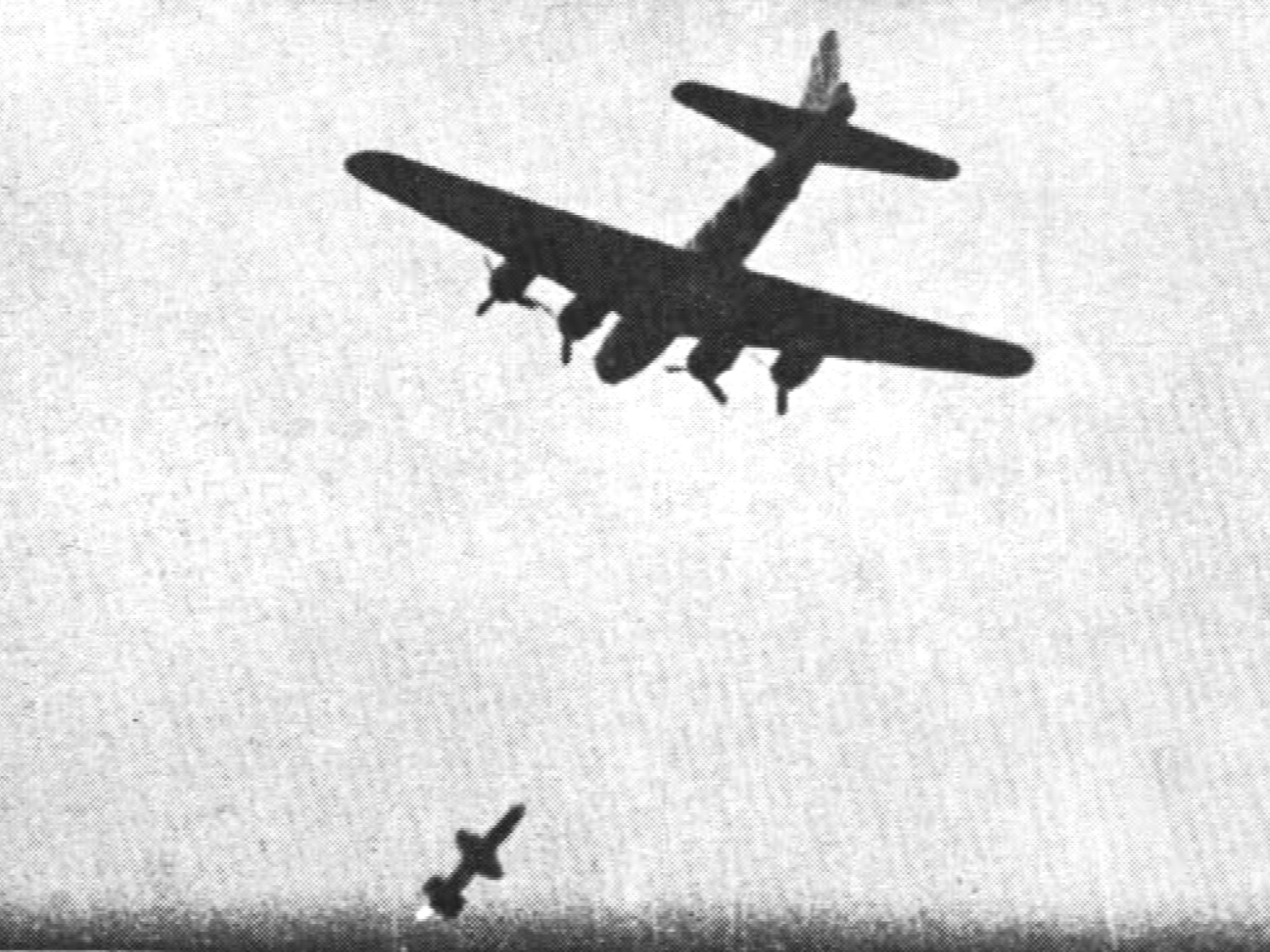
A Talos shortly before hitting a B-17 target drone in 1957.

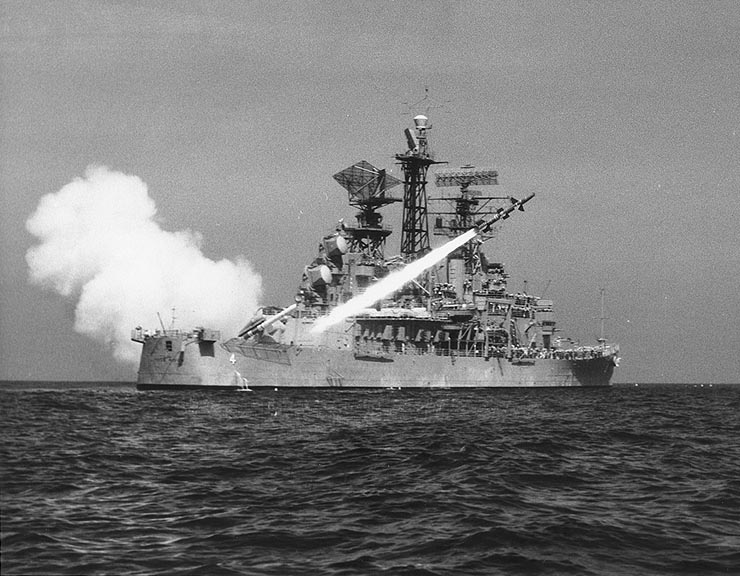
USS Little Rock fires a Talos, 4 May 1961.

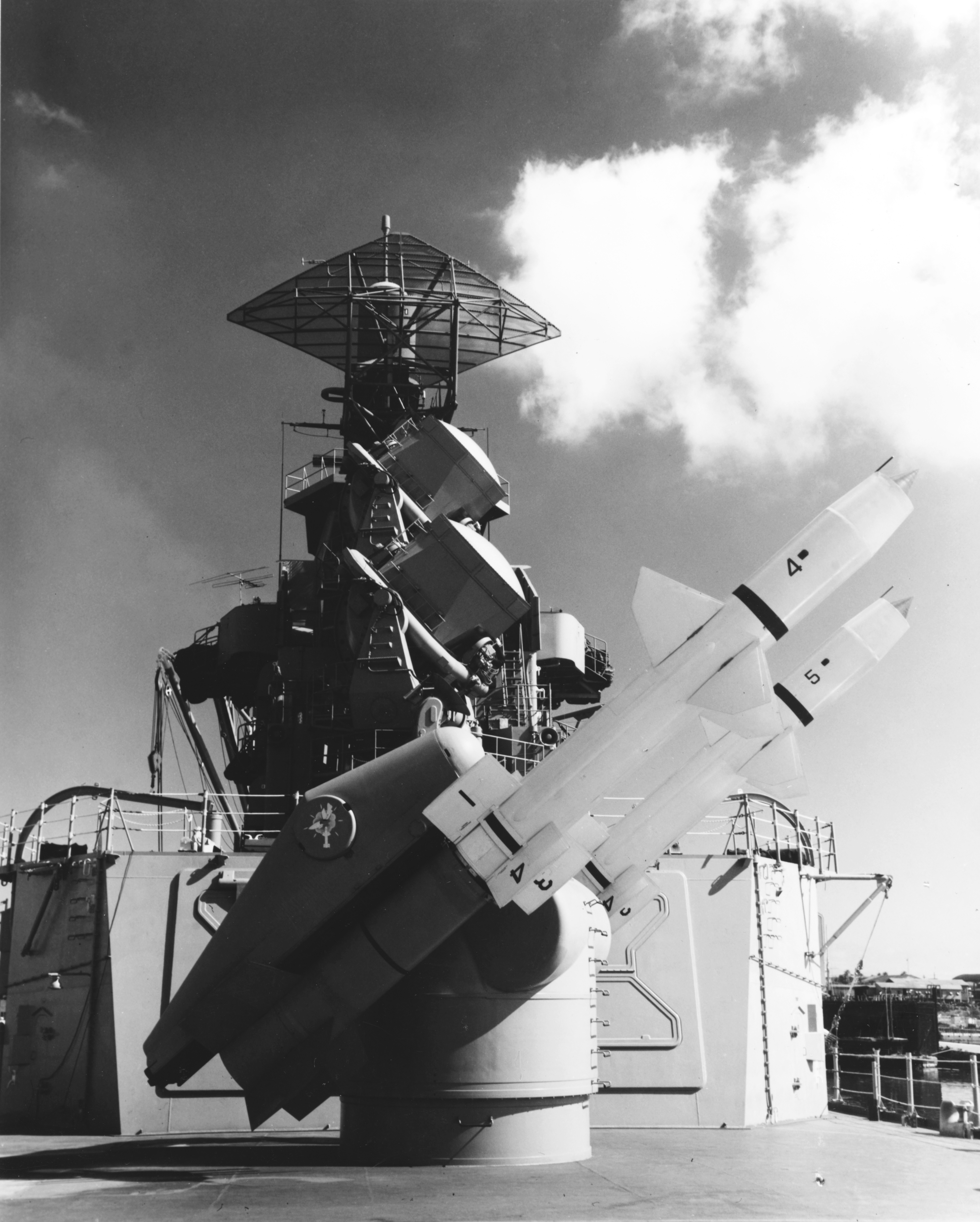
Talos missiles on USS Little Rock, November 1960.

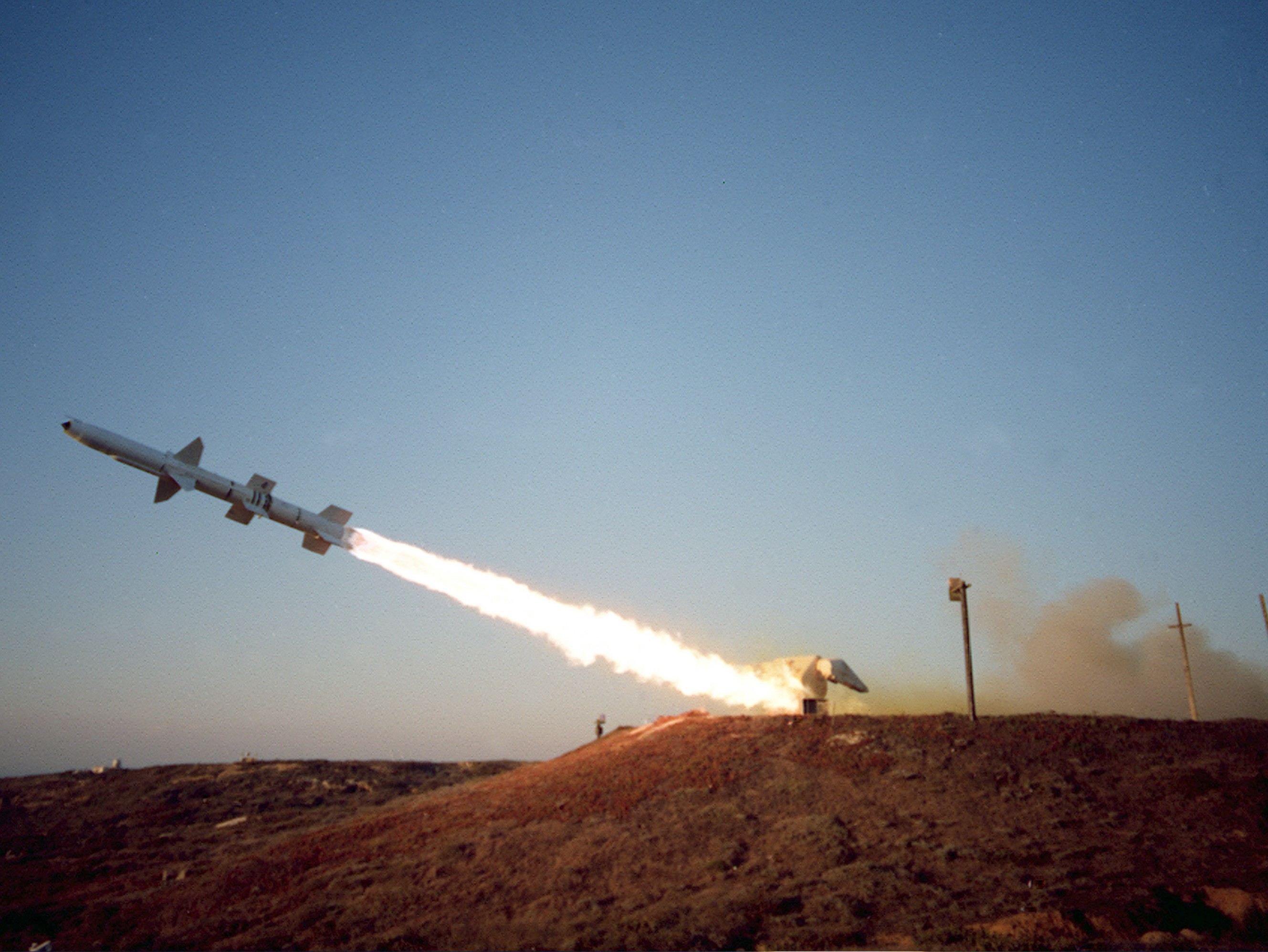
MQM-8G Vandal launch from San Nicolas Island, in 1999.

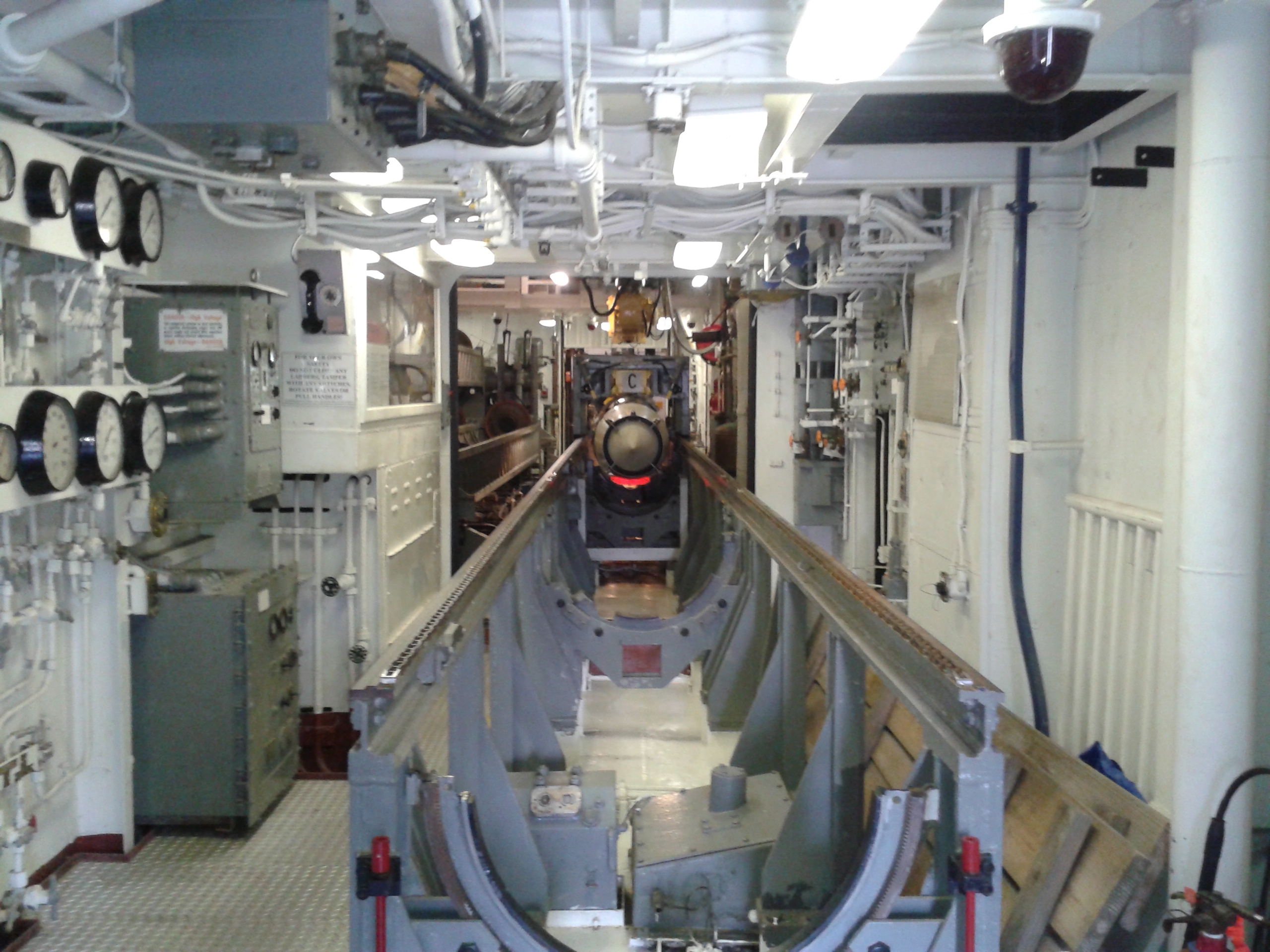
RIM-8 Talos missile loading conveyor aboard USS Little Rock.

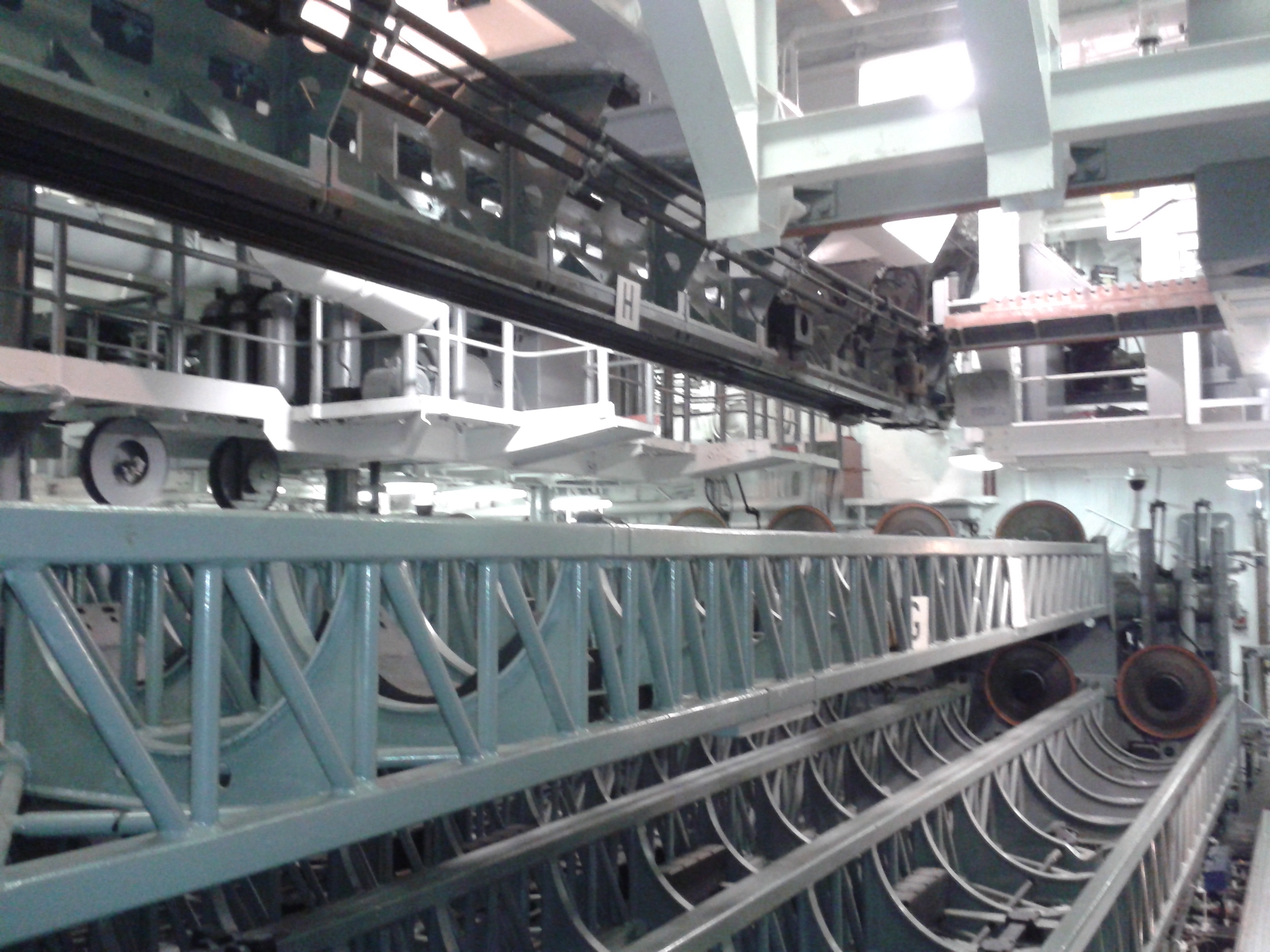
RIM-8 Talos magazine racks in USS Little Rock

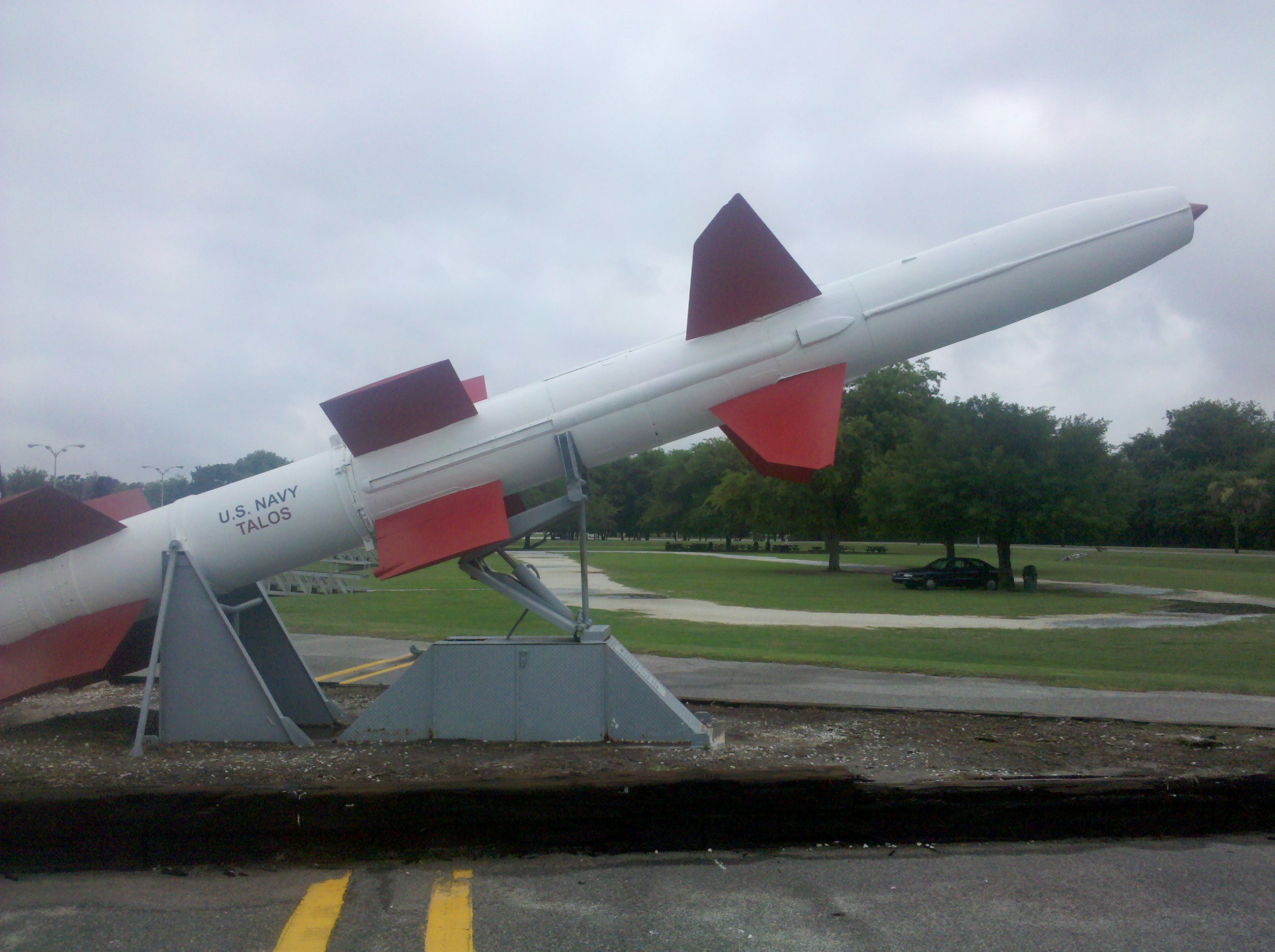
RIM-8 Talos display, Patriots Point Naval Museum, Charleston South Carolina

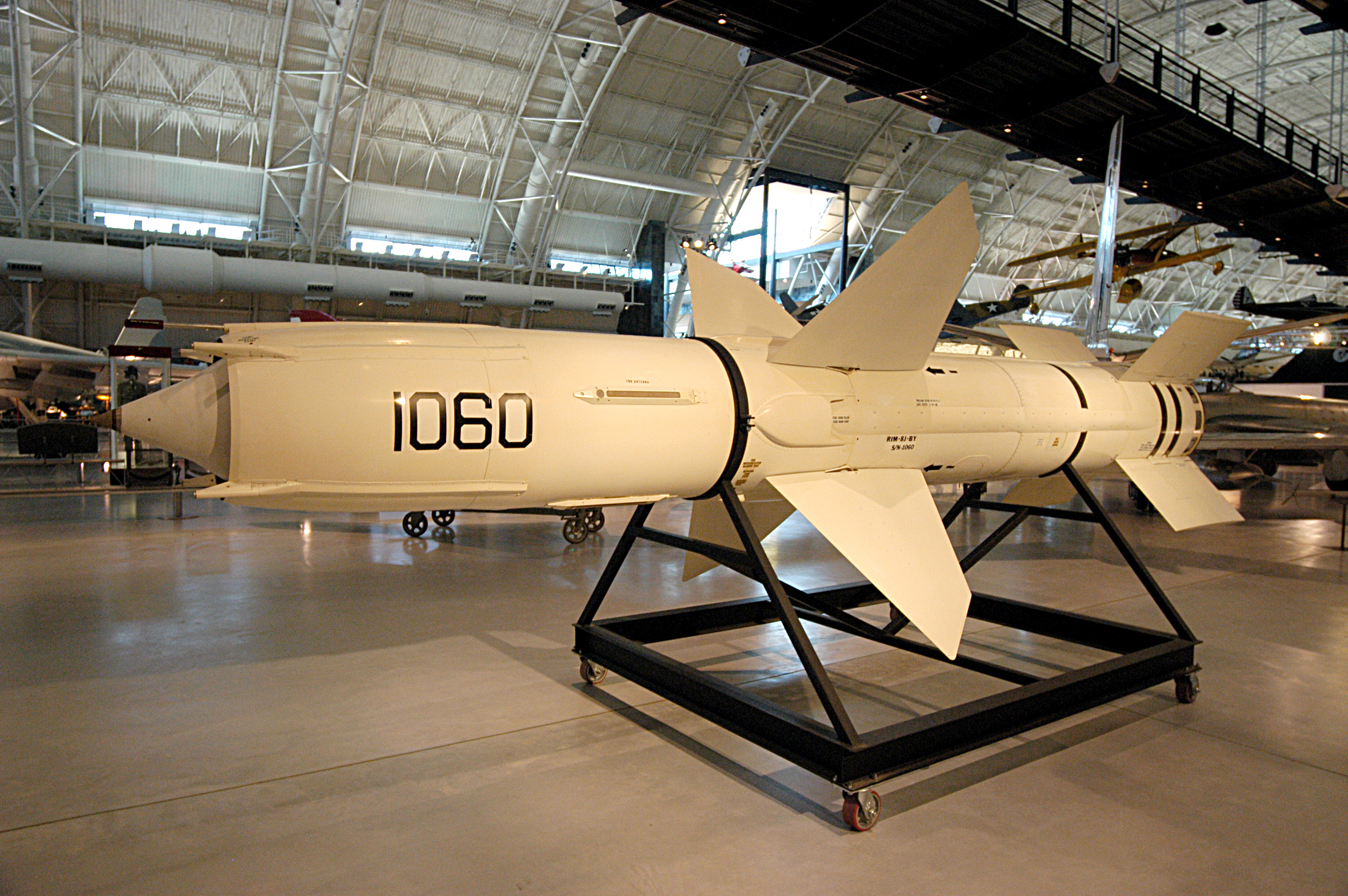
A Bendix RIM-8 Talos on display at the Steven F. Udvar-Hazy Center in Chantilly, VA

== See also ==
- RIM-2 Terrier
- RIM-24 Tartar
- Sea Dart, the Royal Navy's similar design.
