= Gov. Samuel Ashe Grave =

Historic gravesite in North Carolina, United States

- U.S. National Register of Historic Places
- Location within North Carolina Location within the United States
- Location: Farm Ln., from S side of NC 1411, 0.7 miles E of crossing of Pike Creek, near Rocky Point, North Carolina
- Coordinates: 34°28′41″N 77°51′9″W
- Area: less than one acre
- Built: 1813, 1967
- NRHP reference No.: 01001096
- Added to NRHP: October 12, 2001

Gov. Samuel Ashe Grave is a historic grave site located near Rocky Point, North Carolina. The grave is located in the Ashe family cemetery. It is the grave of Governor Samuel Ashe (1725–1813) and is marked by an eight-foot by four-foot granite slab installed in 1967.

It was listed on the National Register of Historic Places in 2001.
