= AN/ALE-47 =

Airborne ECM flare and chaff ejection system

- Chaff /flare ejector
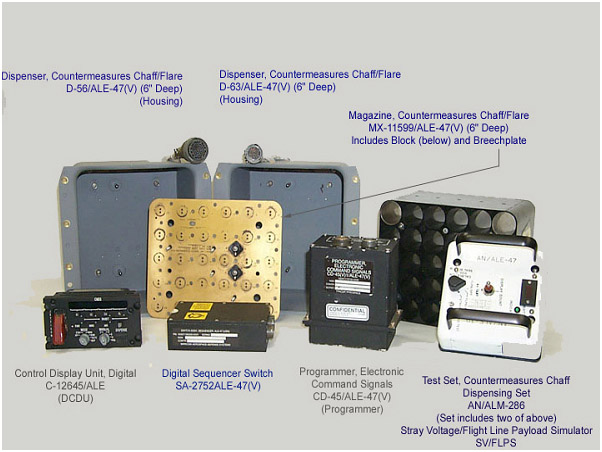
- AN/ALE-47 countermeasures dispenser
- Status: In use

Manufacturing Info
- Manufacturer(s): Tracor, then BAE Systems, and Symetrics Industries
- Introduced: 1998; 27 years ago
- No. produced: >3,000
- Developed from: AN/ALE-40

Usage
- Used by country: >30 countries
- Used by military: US Air Force; US Army; US Navy
- Platform(s): 38 different aircraft

The AN/ALE-47 airborne countermeasures dispenser is used to protect military aircraft from incoming radar and infrared homing missiles. It works by dispensing flares or chaff from a large variety of military aircraft.

In accordance with the Joint Electronics Type Designation System (JETDS), the "AN/ALE-47" designation represents the 47th design of an Army – Navy airborne electronic device for countermeasures ejection equipment. The JETDS system is now also used to name all Department of Defense and some NATO electronic systems.

== Overview ==
The AN/ALE-47 countermeasure dispenser was developed by Tracor, now part of BAE Systems, as an improved version of the older AN/ALE-40 system with more autonomy and software. The ALE-47 is also manufactured by Symetrics Industries, out of Melbourne, Florida. It can be integrated on a wide range of aircraft, including helicopters, cargo aircraft and fighters. It reached initial operating capability (IOC) within the US Navy in 1998. It has since been integrated on 38 different types of aircraft, including the F-16 Fighting Falcon, F/A-18 Hornet, C-17 Globemaster III, CH-47 and UH-60 among others. As of 2008, over 3000 sets had been delivered and are employed on aircraft of 30 different nations.

== Function ==
The ALE-47 is integrated with aircraft radar warning receivers, missile approach warning systems and other electronic warfare sensors. When aircraft sensors detect a threat, the countermeasure dispenser system automatically launches radio frequency and infrared countermeasures to defeat incoming anti-aircraft missiles. The ALE-47 is compatible with a wide variety of flares and chaff types. It is also designed to work with advanced future countermeasures.

== Components ==
The ALE-47 consists of a cockpit control unit, sequencer units, countermeasure dispensers and an optional programmer. The cockpit control unit provides an interface with the pilot. A programmer can be added for extra features, such as advanced threat evaluation and may also be used to fully integrate the system with an aircraft's glass cockpit eliminating the need for the cockpit control unit. The sequencer units control the dispensers, and are capable of automatically detecting misfires and correcting them. On rotary-wing aircraft, the sequencers are built into the dispenser units. The system can accommodate up to 32 dispensers on fixed-wing aircraft and 16 on rotary-wing aircraft. Each dispenser can hold five different types of countermeasures with up to 30 installed.

== See also ==
- AN/ALQ-144
- List of military electronics of the United States
- List of US military aircraft countermeasures ejection/release systems
