= Tracor =

Defunct American defense electronics contractor

Tracor, Inc.
- Founded: 1955 (as Associated Consultants and Engineers)
- Defunct: July 1998
- Fate: Acquired by GEC
- Successor: BAE Systems Sensor Integration
- Headquarters: Austin, Texas, US

Tracor, Inc. was a major North American defense electronics contractor which was acquired by Marconi Electronic Systems (MES), a subsidiary of General Electric Company plc, in 1998. Following the purchase of MES by British Aerospace in November 1999 to form BAE Systems, Tracor became BAE Systems Integrated Defense Solutions. Following a 2005 reorganisation, the company became BAE Systems Sensor Integration, part of Electronics and Integrated Solutions.

== History ==
Tracor was founded in 1954 as Associated Consultants and Engineers. Tracor was the brainchild of physicist Richard N. Lane, its first president. He recruited Frank W. McBee, Chester McKinney, and Jess Stanbrough as its founders, and these four added an attorney friend, Harry Pollard, and machinist Byron Grisham, Jr. Early contracts included sales to Union Carbide and the United States Navy. The company's early focus on research and development soon expanded to the manufacture of instruments and components. In 1960 the company was renamed Texas Research Associates and in 1962 merged with Textran Corporation (formed by physicist O. J. Baltzer, mechanical engineer Marcel Gres, mathematician Gene Smith, and accountant George Strandtmann) to become Tracor.

D. Van Holliday was one of Tracor's founding employees

In 1976, Tracor became the first Austin, Texas, based company on the New York Stock Exchange.

In 1981, Tracor created Rokar International in Jerusalem, Israel for the development of advanced electronics for military and commercial applications.

Tracor was acquired by Westmark Systems in 1986. Westmark was soon in financial difficulties partly because the $866 million deal was highly leveraged but also due to a collapse in oil prices. Westmark filed for bankruptcy protection in 1989 and in 1991 Tracor was split from the company.

In 1993, Tracor increased its size dramatically with the acquisition of Vitro Corporation from Penn Central Transportation Company for $94 million. In 1994, Tracor purchased GDE Systems Inc. from the Carlyle Group. (GDE Systems was originally the General Dynamics Electronics Division before it was spun off.) In February 1996, Tracor acquired AEL Industries, an electronic warfare systems and components manufacturer which became part of the Tracor Aerospace division in March 1997.

In September 1996, the company acquired Cordant Inc., a privately held provider of computer services to the government

Tracor had a 30-year history of support of the Aegis defense system on United States Navy cruisers and destroyers. Tracor had great success in its later years designing and producing flare and chaff cartridges and its dispenser systems for military aircraft in defense against infrared- and radar-targeting missiles.

=== GEC takeover ===
General Electric Company plc announced its intention to acquire Tracor in April 1998 and to merge it with a North American subsidiary. Following a review by the Committee on Foreign Investment in the United States (CFIUS) (to ensure there were no national security implications) GEC completed the transaction in June 1998. The relatively quick decision, particularly for such an important defense contractor, was due to the relationship which already existed between GEC and the Defense Department. A condition of the purchase was that GEC must appoint a "proxy board". This is a mechanism where the company is run locally by American managers and was employed in this case due to the many sensitive projects which Tracor was involved in. The General Electric Company plc was a British company, not affiliated with the similarly named company which is based in the United States. It has since been renamed to Marconi plc.

The acquisition was as a major expansion of GEC's defence division, GEC-Marconi (later Marconi Electronic Systems), however seven months later GEC announced the demerger of Marconi Electronic Systems (including the North American defence businesses) which would then merge with British Aerospace (BAe) to form BAE Systems. This process was completed on November 30, 1999. Commentators have described Tracor as the jewel in crown of GEC-Marconi North America.

=== BAE Systems ===
In the new company GEC's North American defense businesses were merged with BAe's U.S. interests to form BAE Systems North America. In the years since, BAE Systems has pursued growth in America more aggressively than any other area in order to take advantage of the large U.S. procurement and research budgets. Today BAE Systems Inc. (of which Tracor is part) is the largest foreign player in the U.S. defense market.

== Organization ==
- Tracor Information Systems
- Tracor Aerospace
- Tracor Systems Technologies
- Tracor Instruments
- Tracor Applied Sciences
- Tracor Aviation
