= Kellex Corporation =

American nuclear materials company

The Kellex Corporation
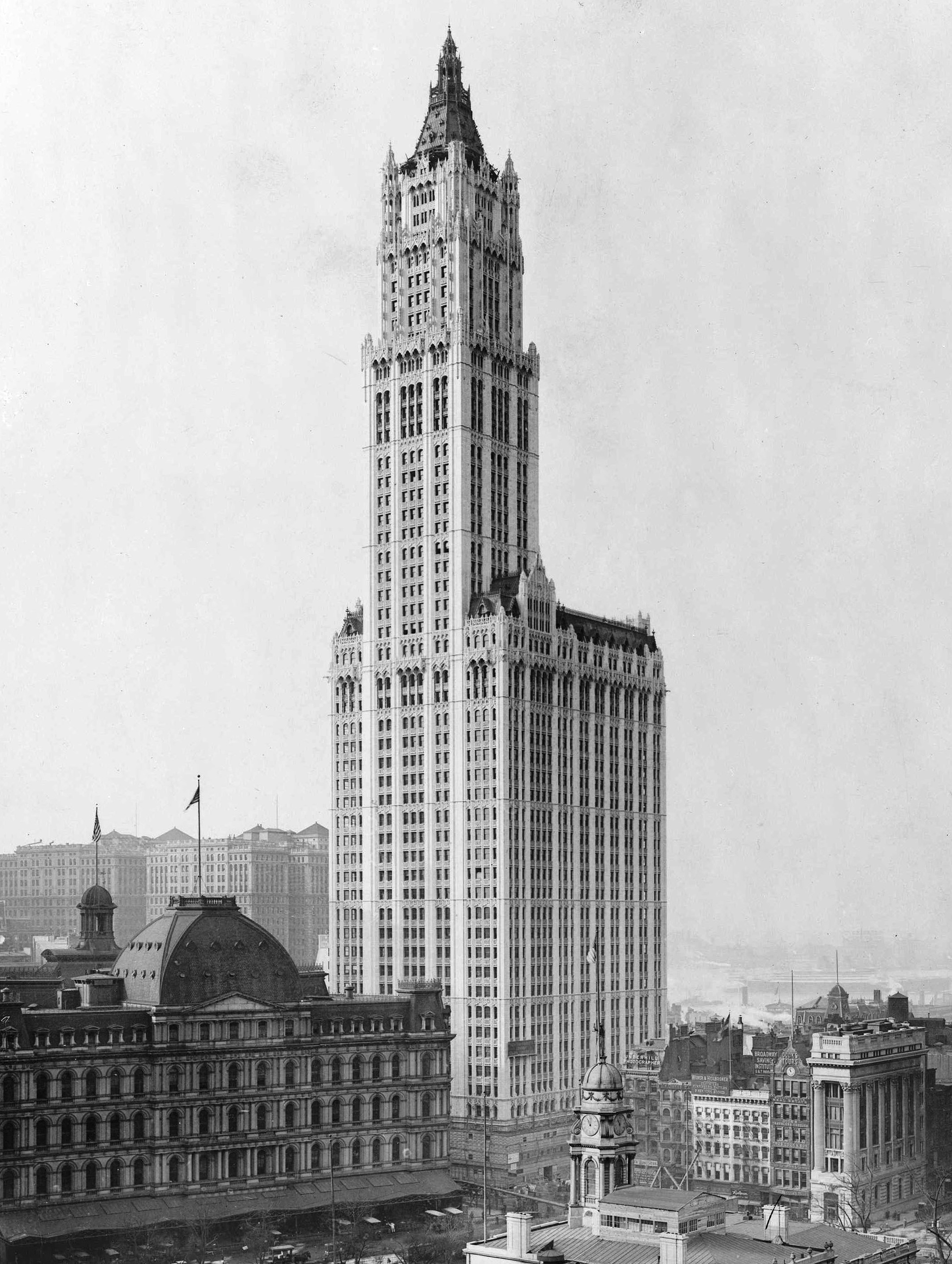
- The Woolworth Building, headquarters of Kellex
- Company type: Wholly owned subsidiary
- Industry: Nuclear material
- Founded: 1942; 83 years ago
- Defunct: 1950
- Fate: Acquired by Vitro Corporation
- Headquarters: Lower Manhattan, New York, U.S.
- Products: Enriched uranium
- Parent: M. W. Kellogg Company

The Kellex Corporation was a wholly owned subsidiary of M. W. Kellogg Company. Kellex was formed in 1942 so that Kellogg's operations relating to the Manhattan Project could be kept separate and secret. "Kell" stood for "Kellogg" and "X" for secret. The new company's goal was to design a facility for the production of enriched uranium through gaseous diffusion. In gaseous diffusion, isotopes of Uranium-235 could be separated from Uranium-238 by turning uranium metal into uranium hexafluoride gas and straining it through a barrier material.

== History ==
The M. W. Kellogg Company, headquartered in Jersey City, New Jersey, specialized in chemical engineering projects. A year before the Manhattan Project began, the S-1 Section of the Office of Scientific Research and Development asked Kellogg to work with John R. Dunning and other scientists at Columbia University to ascertain the feasibility of gaseous diffusion. The pilot project at Kellogg was led by Percival C. "Dobie" Keith, vice-president of engineering at Kellogg, with A. L. Baker as Project Manager, and J. H. Arnold as Director of Research and Development. The work that Kellogg and Keith were doing on the pilot project made them obvious choices when the Manhattan Project looked for a company to create a production level processing plant.

The newly formed Kellex company was headquartered in the Woolworth Building in Lower Manhattan, co-located with the New York Area Engineers Office, which oversaw the contract and the nearly one hundred Special Engineer Detachment personnel which had been assigned to the firm headquarters. Kellex facilities were also located at Columbia University's Nash Garage Building in New York City, in Decatur, Illinois, in Kellogg's Jersey City plant, and at the Clinton Engineer Works in Oak Ridge, Tennessee.

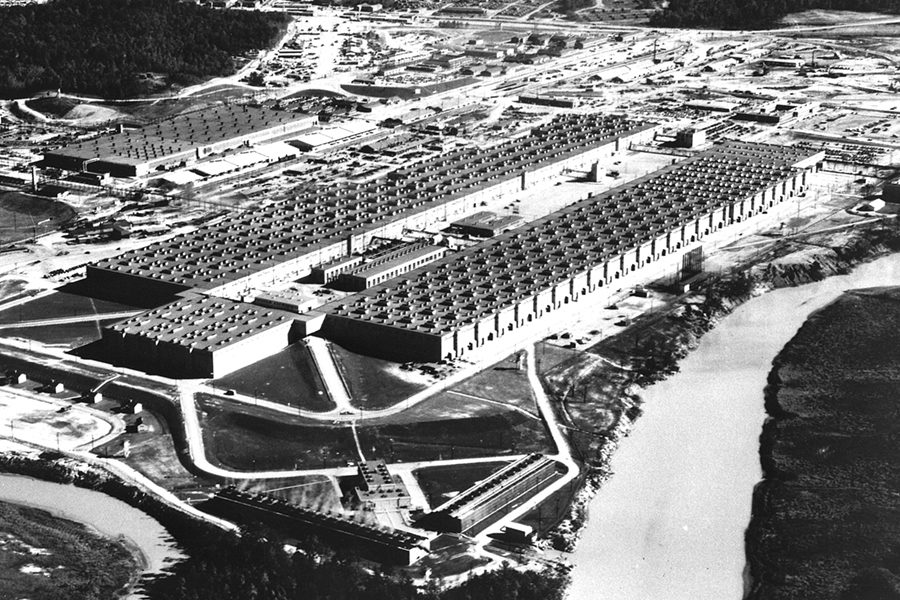
The K-25 building of the Oak Ridge Gaseous Diffusion Plant

Kellex was charged with developing processes and equipment and to design the plant. Several technical challenges needed to be met before gas extraction techniques could be effectively applied to separation of uranium. Such a system would need an adequate porous barrier, a workable gas pump, and a pipe that could resist the corrosive effects of uranium hexafluoride gas. Scientists developed and tested different possible processes for uranium extraction at various locations. These included a pilot gaseous diffusion plant built at Columbia University in the Nash Garage Building at 3280 Broadway, New York, NY. Scientists and engineers were developing technology for the proposed production plant at the same time that architects were designing a building to house it.

The project was known as K-25; "K" stood for Kellex while "25" was a common designation for uranium-235 during the Manhattan project. The K-25 production plant at the Clinton Engineer Works was built by the J. A. Jones Construction Company. The mile-long, U-shaped plant covered 44 acres (18 ha), was four stories high and contained hundreds of miles of specially coated, hermetically sealed pipes and equipment. The K-25 plant was the single most expensive facility of the Manhattan Project. Once built it was operated by the Carbide and Carbon Chemicals Corporation.

In 1950, Kellex Corporation was acquired by Vitro Corporation.
