= Operation Bumblebee =

US Navy effort to develop surface-to-air missiles

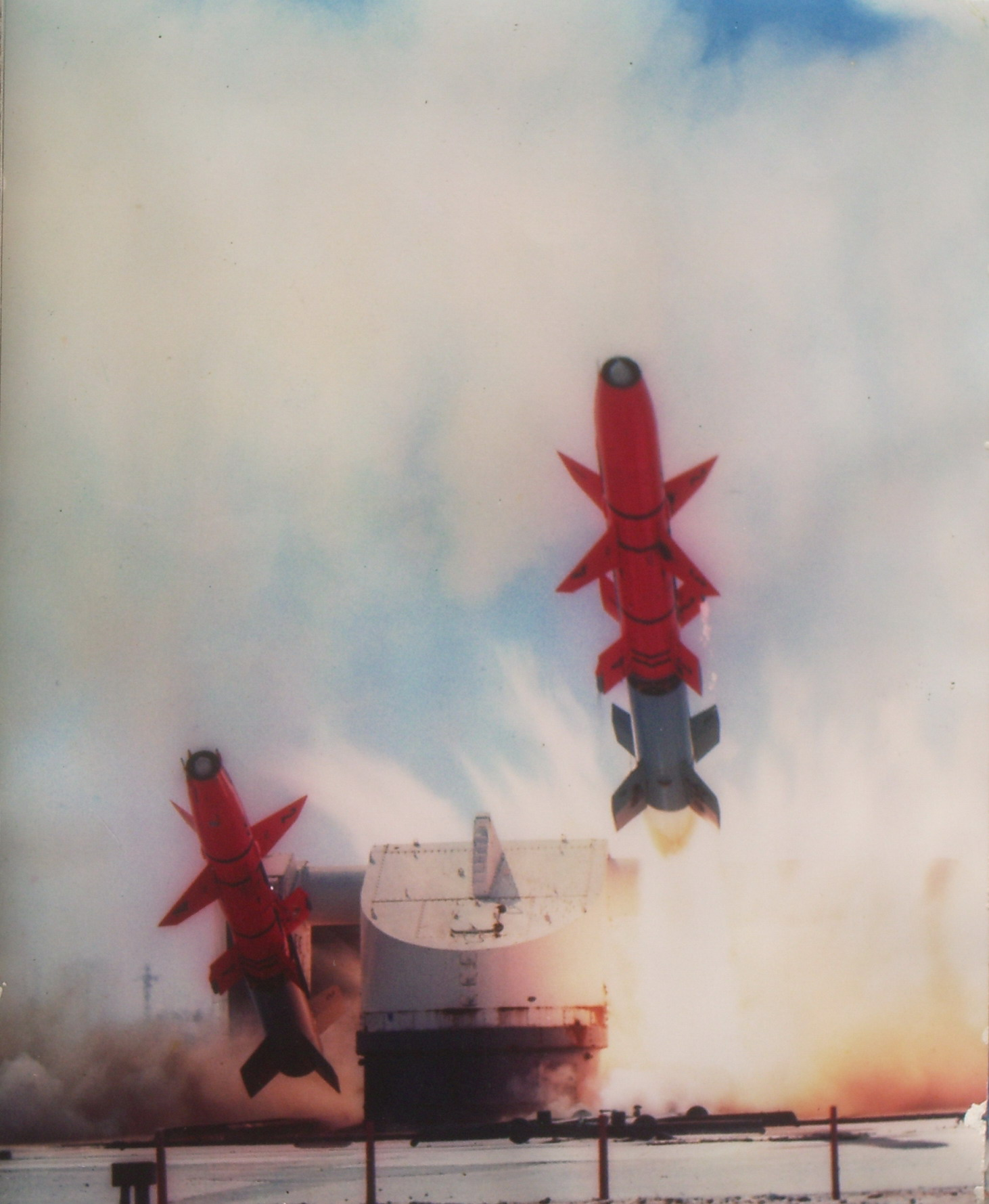
RIM-8 Talos test firing

Operation Bumblebee was a US Navy effort to develop surface-to-air missiles (SAMs) to provide a mid-range layer of anti-aircraft defense between anti-aircraft guns in the short range and fighter aircraft operating at long range. A major reason for the Bumblebee efforts was the need to engage bombers before they could launch standoff anti-shipping weapons, as these aircraft might never enter the range of the shipboard guns.

Bumblebee originally concentrated on a ramjet-powered design, and the initial Applied Physics Lab PTV-N-4 Cobra/BTV (Propulsion Test Vehicle/Burner Test Vehicle) was flown in October 1945. Cobra eventually emerged as the RIM-8 Talos, which entered service on 28 May 1958 aboard the light cruiser USS Galveston. As part of the development program, several other vehicles were also developed. One of these developed into the RIM-2 Terrier, which entered operational status on 15 June 1956, two years before Talos; Terrier was first installed aboard the heavy cruiser USS Canberra. The Terrier was later modified as a short-range missile system for smaller ships, entering service in 1963 as the RIM-24 Tartar. Together, the three missiles were known as the "3 Ts".

Bumblebee was not the only early Navy SAM project; the SAM-N-2 Lark was rushed into production as a short-range counter to the Kamikaze threat. However, it never matured into an operational weapon. The RIM-50 Typhon was developed to replace the 3 Ts but was cancelled during development. The 3 Ts were ultimately replaced by the RIM-66 Standard, a development of the Tartar.

== Origin ==
Navy ships were hit by air-launched Henschel Hs 293 and Ruhrstahl SD 1400 X anti-ship guided bombs in 1943. A ramjet-powered anti-aircraft missile was proposed to destroy aircraft launching such weapons while remaining beyond the range of shipboard artillery. Initial performance goals were target intercept at a horizontal range of 10 miles and 30,000 ft (9,100 m) altitude, with a 300 to 600 lb (140 to 270 kg) warhead for a 30 to 60 percent kill probability.

Heavy shipping losses to kamikaze attacks during the Battle of Okinawa provided additional incentive for missile development. This role was not as demanding as the attacking weapon was much larger, but there was a desire for long range and rapid deployment. This led to a second concept, the SAM-N-2 Lark, a subsonic missile intended to provide a middle layer of defense between the long-range combat air patrols and short-range anti-aircraft artillery. With the ending of the war, and the introduction of jet-powered bombers with significantly higher performance, interest in Lark ended in favor of the Bumblebee efforts, and the prototype examples were used as test vehicles.

== Field testing ==
In addition to initial tests at the Island Beach, New Jersey, and Fort Miles, Delaware, temporary sites, Camp Davis, North Carolina, was used for Operation Bumblebee from 1 June 1946 to 28 July 1948. Topsail Island, North Carolina, became the permanent Bumblebee testing and launch facility in March 1947. The Topsail Historical Society hosts the Missiles and More Museum at the site. Testing was transferred to Naval Air Weapons Station China Lake and then to White Sands Missile Range in 1951, where USS Desert Ship (LLS-1) was built as a prototype Talos launch facility.

== Program results ==
The RIM-2 Terrier, devised as a test vehicle, became operational as a fleet anti-aircraft missile aboard USS Boston in 1955 and evolved into the RIM-66 Standard. Talos became operational with the fleet aboard USS Galveston in February 1959 and saw combat use during the Vietnam War. Ramjet knowledge acquired during the program aided the development of the XB-70 Valkyrie and the SR-71 Blackbird. Solid fuel boosters developed to bring the ramjet to operational velocity formed the basis for larger solid fuel rocket motors for ICBMs, satellite launch vehicles, and the Space Shuttle.
