= Pender County Schools =

Public school system serving Pender County, North Carolina, US

Pender County Schools is a public school system located in southeastern North Carolina, providing an education for 7,800 students in Pender County. Pender County School District consists of 19 schools located in a diverse array of suburban and rural communities, and serves students in pre-school through grade 12. The Central Service Offices are located in Burgaw, North Carolina, about 21 miles from Wilmington, North Carolina. The first public school in Pender County was started in the town of Atkinson.

== Schools ==
Elementary Schools:

- C.F. Pope Elementary (Burgaw)
- Cape Fear Elementary (Rocky Point)
- Malpass Corner Elementary (Burgaw)
- North Topsail Elementary (Hampstead)
- Penderlea Elementary (Willard)
- Rocky Point Elementary (Rocky Point)
- South Topsail Elementary (Hampstead)
- Surf City Elementary (Hampstead)
- Topsail Elementary (Hampstead)

Middle Schools:

- Burgaw Middle School (Burgaw)
- Cape Fear Middle School (Rocky Point)
- Penderlea Middle School (Willard)
- Surf City Middle School (Hampstead)
- Topsail Middle School (Hampstead)
- West Pender Middle School (Burgaw)

High Schools:

- Heide Trask High School (Rocky Point)
- Pender Early College High School (Burgaw)
- Pender High School (Burgaw)
- Topsail High School (Hampstead)
