= Montague, North Carolina =

Unincorporated community in North Carolina, U.S.

Montague
- Unincorporated community
- Location within North Carolina
- Coordinates: 34.43°N 78.06°W
- Country: United States
- State: North Carolina
- County: Pender
- Time zone: UTC-5 (EST)
  - Summer (DST): UTC-4 (EDT)
- Area codes: 910, 472

Montague is an unincorporated community in Pender County, North Carolina, United States.

== Geography ==
Montague is located in southwestern Pender County, southeast of Currie.

The ZIP Code for Montague is 28435.
