= Heide Trask High School =

American public school in North Carolina

Heide Trask Senior High School

Location
- 14328 NC Hwy 210; Rocky Point, North Carolina 28457; United States; 34°26′23″N 77°53′46″W

Information
- Other name: Titantown
- Type: Public
- Established: 2002
- School district: Pender County Schools
- CEEB code: 343389
- Principal: Brian Allen
- Teaching staff: 33.45 (on an FTE basis)
- Grades: 9–12
- Enrollment: 732 (2024–2025)
- Student to teacher ratio: 21.88
- Colors: Black, royal blue, and silver
- Slogan: "Team work makes the DREAM work"
- Mascot: Titus the Titan
- Website: www.pender.k12.nc.us/o/htshs/

Heide Trask Sr. High is a high school in eastern Rocky Point, North Carolina It is inside the Pender County School District. Its current principal is Gene Hudson.

Trask High has a population of around 700 students.

== History ==
Heide Trask High School is named after C. Heide Trask, a member of the North Carolina State Highway Commission. The school's campus is built on land donated by the Trask family. Heide Trask High School opened in 2002 to prevent overcrowding at another local high school, Pender High School.

== Sports ==
Student athletic eligibility is determined by the successful passing of fifty percent of the classes in the semester prior to the semester of the sport participation. Serving as an on-campus intern, teacher assistant, and media assistant does not count as a class for eligibility. Students must be present in school no less than 85% of the semester in order to be eligible for the next semester’s sport season. Heide Trask Sr High School currently provides the following sports:

- Cheerleading
- Cross Country
- Frisbee
- Golf
- J.V. Baseball
- J.V. Football
- J.V. Softball
- J.V. Volleyball
- Men's JV Basketball
- Men's Soccer
- Men's Varsity Basketball
- Track
- Varsity Baseball
- Varsity Football
- Varsity Softball
- Varsity Volleyball
- Women's Soccer
- Women's Varsity Basketball
- Wrestling
