= Belvidere Plantation House =

Historic house in North Carolina, United States

- U.S. National Register of Historic Places
- Location: Off SR 1565, near Hampstead, North Carolina
- Coordinates: 34.395539, -77.642234
- Area: 152.9 acres (61.9 ha)
- Built: c. 1810
- Architectural style: Greek Revival, Georgian, Federal
- NRHP reference No.: 82003495
- Added to NRHP: June 14, 1982

Belvidere Plantation House, also known as the Merrick-Nixon House, is a historic plantation house located near Hampstead, Pender County, North Carolina, US. It was built about 1810 for slaveholder George Merrick, and was a 1 1/2-story, three-bay, gambrel-roofed dwelling with Georgian, Federal, and Greek Revival style design elements. It was sheathed in weatherboard and has exterior end chimneys and a shed-roofed front porch.

Its dilapidated structure burned to the ground on December 31, 2006, or January 1, 2007.
