= Burgaw Normal and Industrial School =

Information
- Former names: Burgaw Institute; Burgaw Colored High School; C. F. Pope High School
- Established: 1896

Burgaw Normal and Industrial School, organized in 1896 as Burgaw Institute, was a school for African American students in Burgaw, North Carolina. A Normal School, it taught school teachers. In 1925 it became Burgaw Colored High School. In 1939 the Pender County Board of Education acquired the school from the Baptist Association that ran it. It was expanded and eventually became C. F. Pope High School in 1952, for its long serving principal Cicero F. Pope.

Burgaw businessman and teacher Wesley Jones was active in supporting the school.

The school's curriculum included agricultural and industrial education. Mary Louise Dean Smith was a teacher and librarian at the school. The school was on the northeast corner of Wallace Street and Wright Street.

A photo of the school survives at the Pender County Public Library.
