= Penderlea Homesteads Historic District =

Historic district in North Carolina, United States

- U.S. National Register of Historic Places
- U.S. Historic district
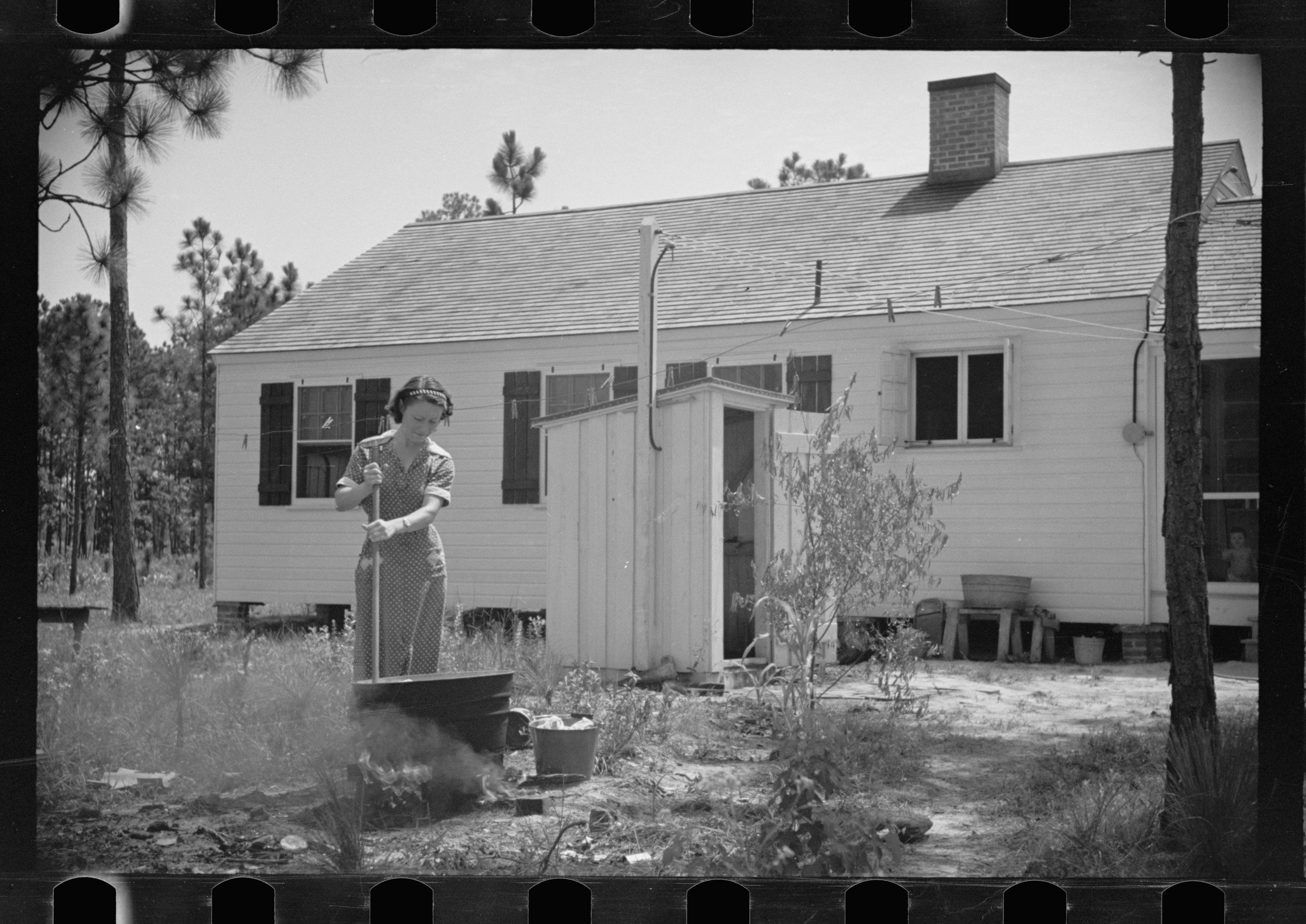
- One of the homesteads in Penderlea, August 1936

- Location within North Carolina Location within the United States
- Location: Bounded by Sills Cr., Webber, Crooked Run, Lake, Lamb & Raccoon Rds., near Willard, North Carolina
- Coordinates: 34°39′34″N 78°02′59″W
- Area: 57 acres (23 ha)
- Built: c. 1934
- Architect: John Nolen; Stearns and Stanton
- Architectural style: Art Deco
- NRHP reference No.: 13000803
- Added to NRHP: September 27, 2013

Penderlea Homesteads Historic District is a national historic district located near Willard, Pender County, North Carolina. The district encompasses 186 contributing buildings, two contributing sites, and nine contributing structures in a rural section of Pender County. The district includes a collection of community buildings and houses constructed as part of the Penderlea Homesteads New Deal project. It includes 88 one-story, frame dwellings constructed as part of the original homestead project. Penderlea was the first experimental farm-city colony established by the United States government through the United States Department of the Interior’s Division of Subsistence Homesteads.

It was listed on the National Register of Historic Places in 2013.
