= Bannerman House =

Historic house in North Carolina, United States

- U.S. National Register of Historic Places
- Location within North Carolina Location within the United States
- Location: NE of Burgaw off NC 53 on SR 1520, near Burgaw, North Carolina
- Coordinates: 34°36′7″N 77°47′26″W
- Area: 9 acres (3.6 ha)
- Built: c. 1840
- Built by: Bannerman, John Player
- Architectural style: Greek Revival
- NRHP reference No.: 74001365
- Added to NRHP: May 31, 1974

Bannerman House is a historic plantation house located near Burgaw, Pender County, North Carolina. It was built about 1840, and is a large two-story, five-bay, L-shaped, Greek Revival style frame dwelling. It is sheathed in weatherboard and has a hipped roof pierced by three interior chimneys. The main facades each feature a one-bay pedimented portico, supported by colossal, flat-paneled pillars.

It was listed on the National Register of Historic Places in 1974.
