= Burgaw station =

- Burgaw Depot
- U.S. National Register of Historic Places
- U.S. Historic district – Contributing property
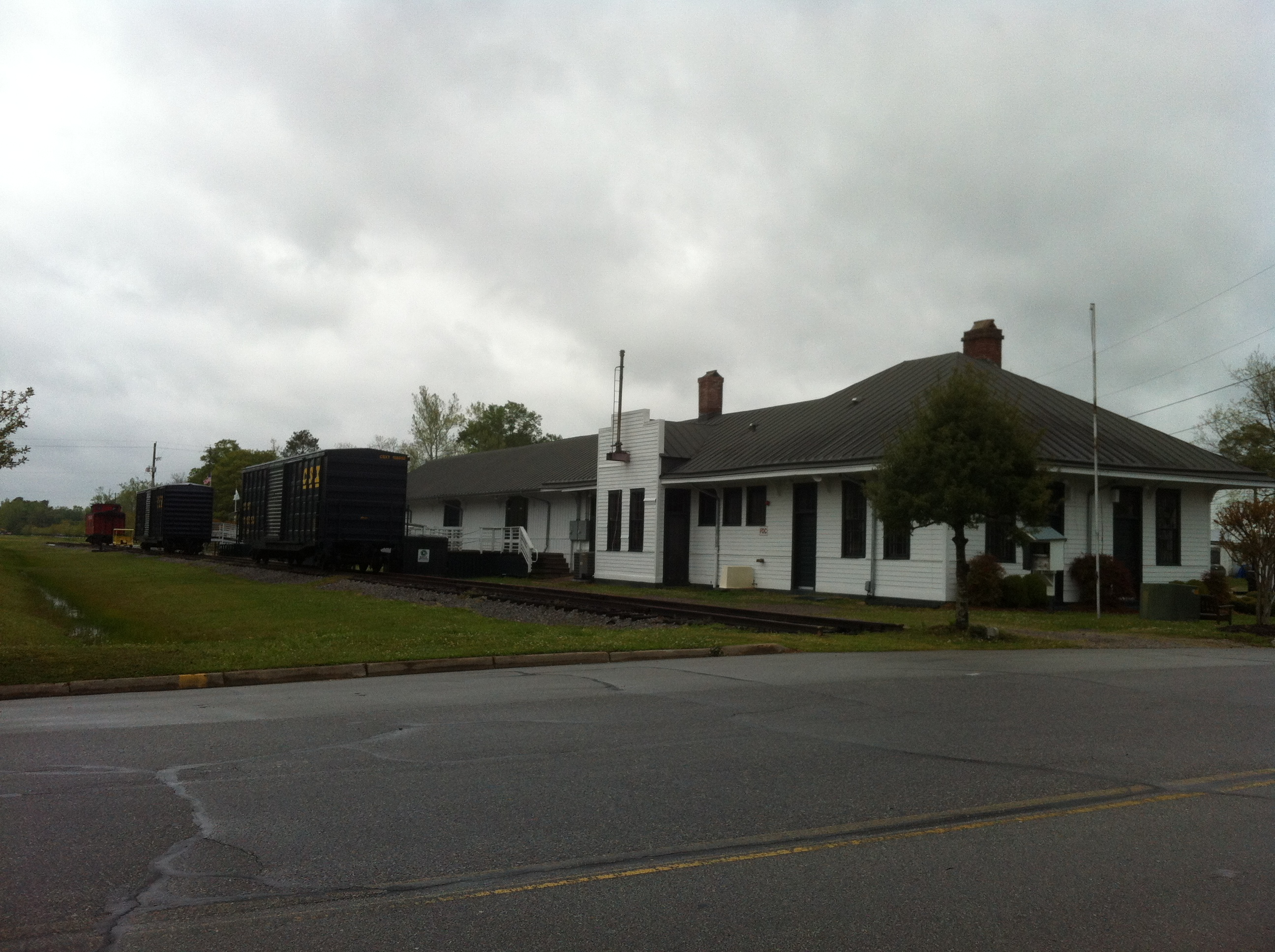

- Location within North Carolina Location within the United States
- Location: 102 E. Fremont, Burgaw, North Carolina
- Coordinates: 34°33′0″N 77°55′43″W
- Area: 1 acre (0.40 ha)
- Built: c. 1850, 1898, 1916-1917
- Built by: Wilmington & Weldon Railroad
- NRHP reference No.: 86001910
- Added to NRHP: July 24, 1986

Burgaw Depot is a historic train station located at Burgaw, Pender County, North Carolina. It was built about 1850 by the Wilmington and Weldon Railroad, with a later 1898 T-shaped addition of passenger waiting rooms and offices and a 1916-1917 addition of freight and warehouse space. It is a long one-story rectangular frame building sheathed in a combination of lap and board and batten siding, and resting on cement, brick and wooden foundations. It is one of only two known surviving antebellum depots in North Carolina; the other is located at Selma, North Carolina.

It was listed on the National Register of Historic Places in 1986. It is located in the Burgaw Historic District.

== the civil war ==
During the war, the Wilmington and Weldon Railroad was a lifeline for the Confederates because it carried fresh troops from the battlefield and brought back the sick and wounded. The station was the Confederate headquarters in North Carolina after the fall of Fort Fisher and Wilmington, and it became the holding site for six thousand or more prisoners of war for over a week in February 1865. Union Calvary under the command of Edward E Potter attacked the station setting it on fire but they were repulsed and pursued by Company A, North Carolina Tenth Battalion (2nd Heavy Artillery). The fire was put out before it could spread. The station fell to the Union forces after the surrender of Wilmington in 1865.

Preceding station	Atlantic Coast Line Railroad	Following station
Watha toward Wilson	Wilson – Wilmington	Ashton toward Wilmington
