= Moores Creek National Battlefield =

Historic battlefield in North Carolina, United States

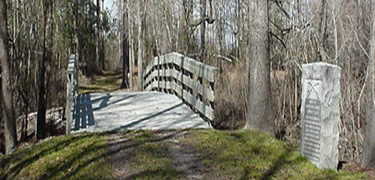
- The reconstructed bridge at Moores Creek

- Location within North Carolina Location within the United States
- Location: Pender County, North Carolina, United States
- Nearest city: Wilmington, North Carolina
- Coordinates: 34°27′29.6″N 78°06′37.1″W
- Area: 88 acres (36 ha)
- Established: June 2, 1926
- Visitors: 55,708 (in 2025)
- Governing body: National Park Service
- Website: Moores Creek National Battlefield
- Moore's Creek National Military Park
- U.S. National Register of Historic Places
- U.S. Historic district
- Nearest city: Wilmington, North Carolina
- Area: 44.3 acres (17.9 ha)
- Built: 1776
- NRHP reference No.: 66000070 (original); 86003649 (increase)

Significant dates
- Added to NRHP: October 15, 1966
- Boundary increase: February 13, 1987

Moores Creek National Battlefield is a battlefield managed by the U.S. National Park Service. The park commemorates the 1776 victory of a thousand patriots over about eight hundred loyalists at Moore's Creek. The battle dashed the hopes of British provincial governor Josiah Martin for regaining control of North Carolina for the Crown. The loyalist defeat simultaneously ended British plans for an invasionary force to land in Brunswick Town. The Second Continental Congress voted to declare independence from the British on July 4, 1776, shortly after the battle; which took place in the Wilmington area near Currie in Pender County in southeastern North Carolina. The national military park was established on June 2, 1926, and was redesignated as a national battlefield on September 8, 1980.

== Background ==
Loyalists, mostly Scottish Highlanders, many of whom did not have muskets and were wielding broadswords, expected to find only a small Patriot force on February 27, 1776. Before the arrival of the Loyalists, the Patriots removed the planks from the bridge that crossed Moore's Creek. After removing the planks of wood, they smeared the remaining crossing beams with lard. This forced the Loyalists to cross the bridge in single file. As the Loyalists advanced across the bridge, Patriot shots rang out and dozens of Loyalists fell into the creek below, including their commanders. At the time, the creek was an estimated six feet deep. One commander, Lieutenant Colonel Donald McLeod, died in the battle. Another commander was Colonel Allan MacDonald, the husband of Flora MacDonald of Highland lore who aided Bonnie Prince Charlie following the Jacobite defeat at Culloden Moor in 1746.

Stunned, outgunned and leaderless, the Loyalists either surrendered or retreated in confusion. Wagons, weapons and British Pound sterling worth more than $1 million by today's value were seized by the Patriots in the days following the battle.

This dramatic victory ended British authority in the colony and greatly influenced North Carolina to be the first colony to vote for independence. The Battle of Moores Creek Bridge, coupled with the Battle of Sullivan's Island near Charleston, South Carolina, a few months later, were the first open conflicts of the American Revolution. Both ultimately led the Thirteen Colonies to declare independence on July 4, 1776.

== Description and administrative history ==
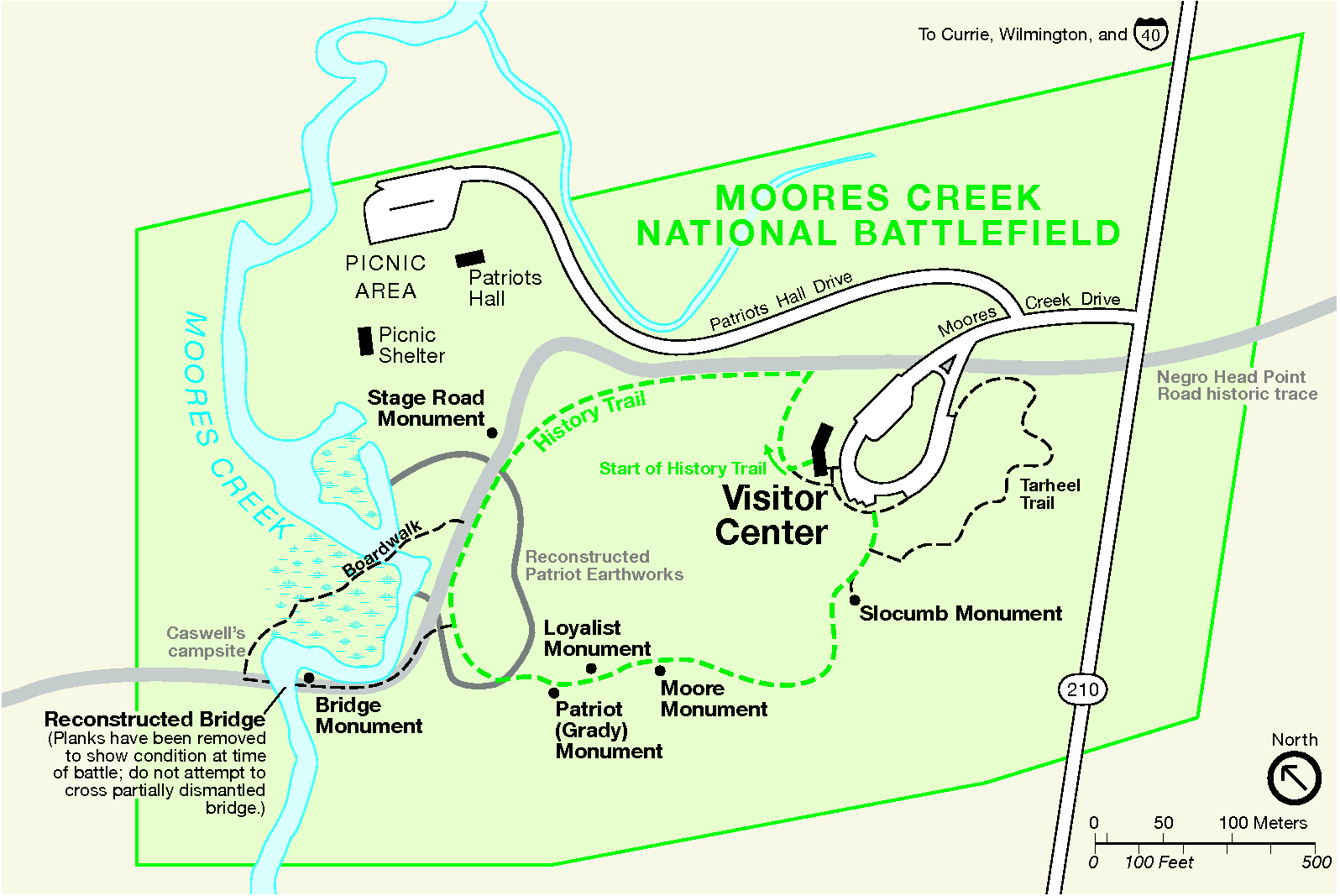
The National Park Service map

The central Moores Creek most likely was named in honor of Elizabeth Moore, a pioneer settler.

Throughout the park, there are remnants of the 1776 road traveled by Patriot and Loyalist forces. A 1-mile (1.6-km) trail with wayside exhibits leads through the battlefield and across Moores Creek. The historic bridge site is located along the trail. The park, located in a rural area, offers a visitor center with exhibits and audio-visual program, a 0.3-mile (500 m) colonial forest trail, and a picnic area.

== Gallery ==
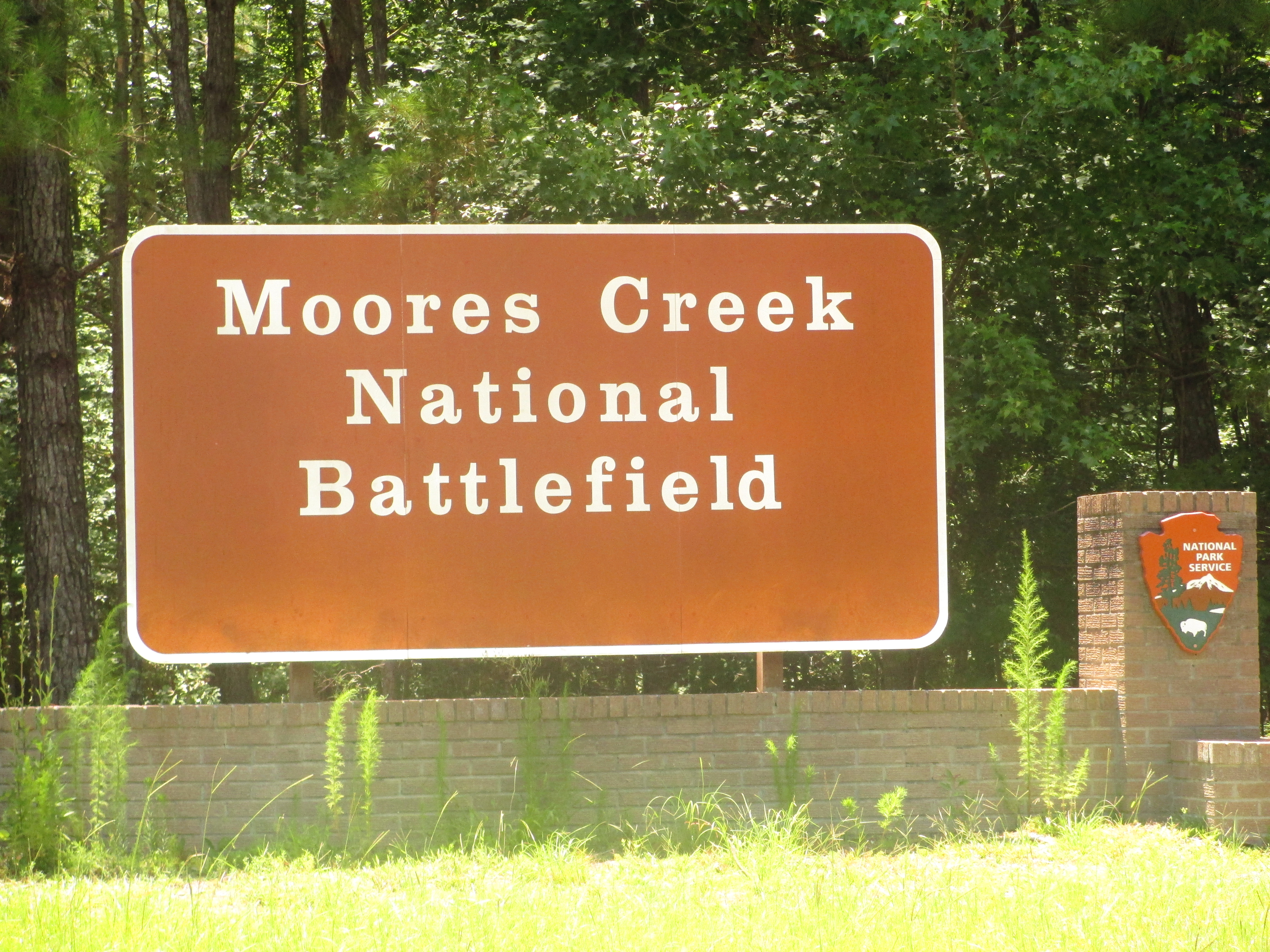
Moores Creek Drive

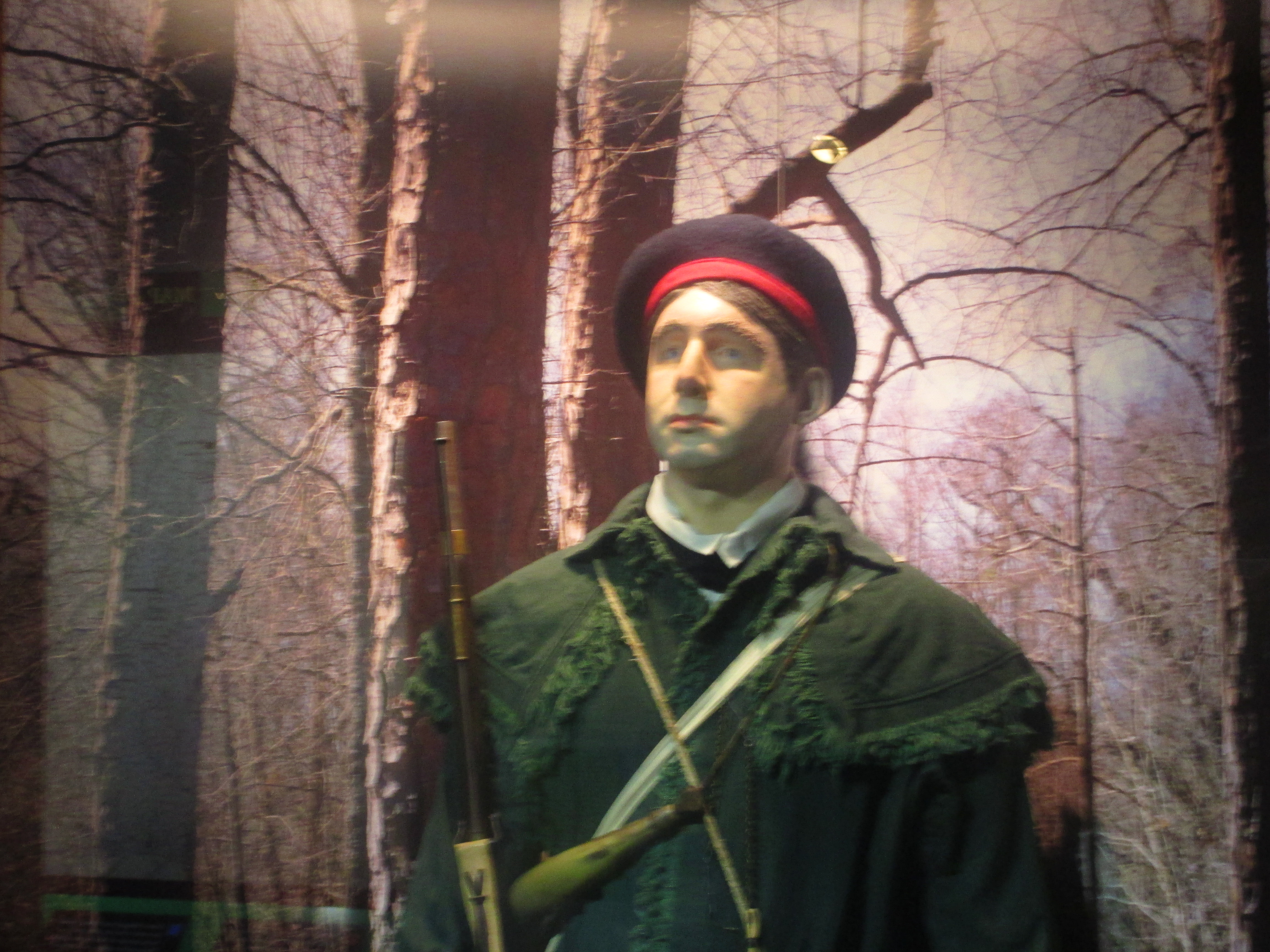
Visitor Center

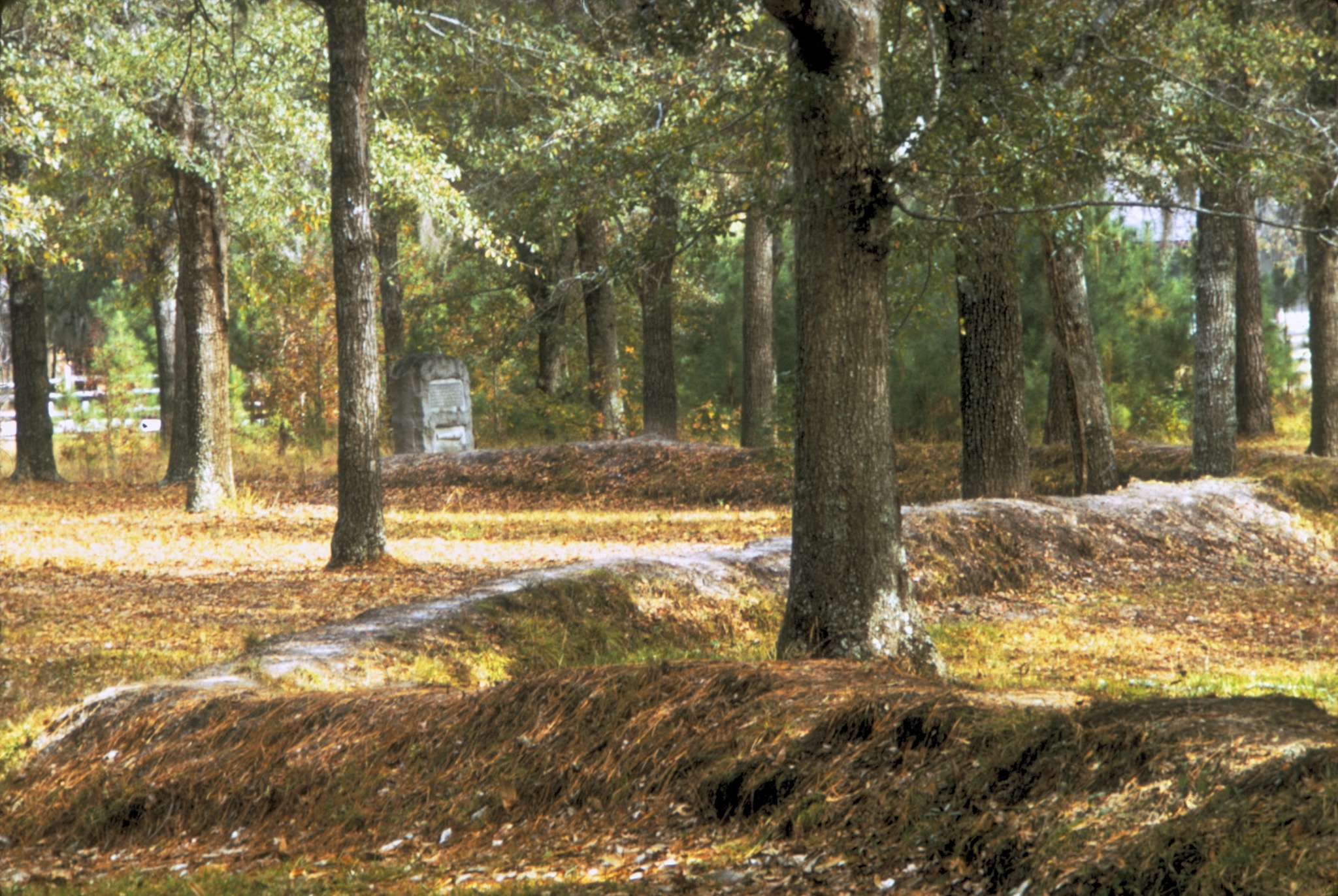
Reconstructed earthworks

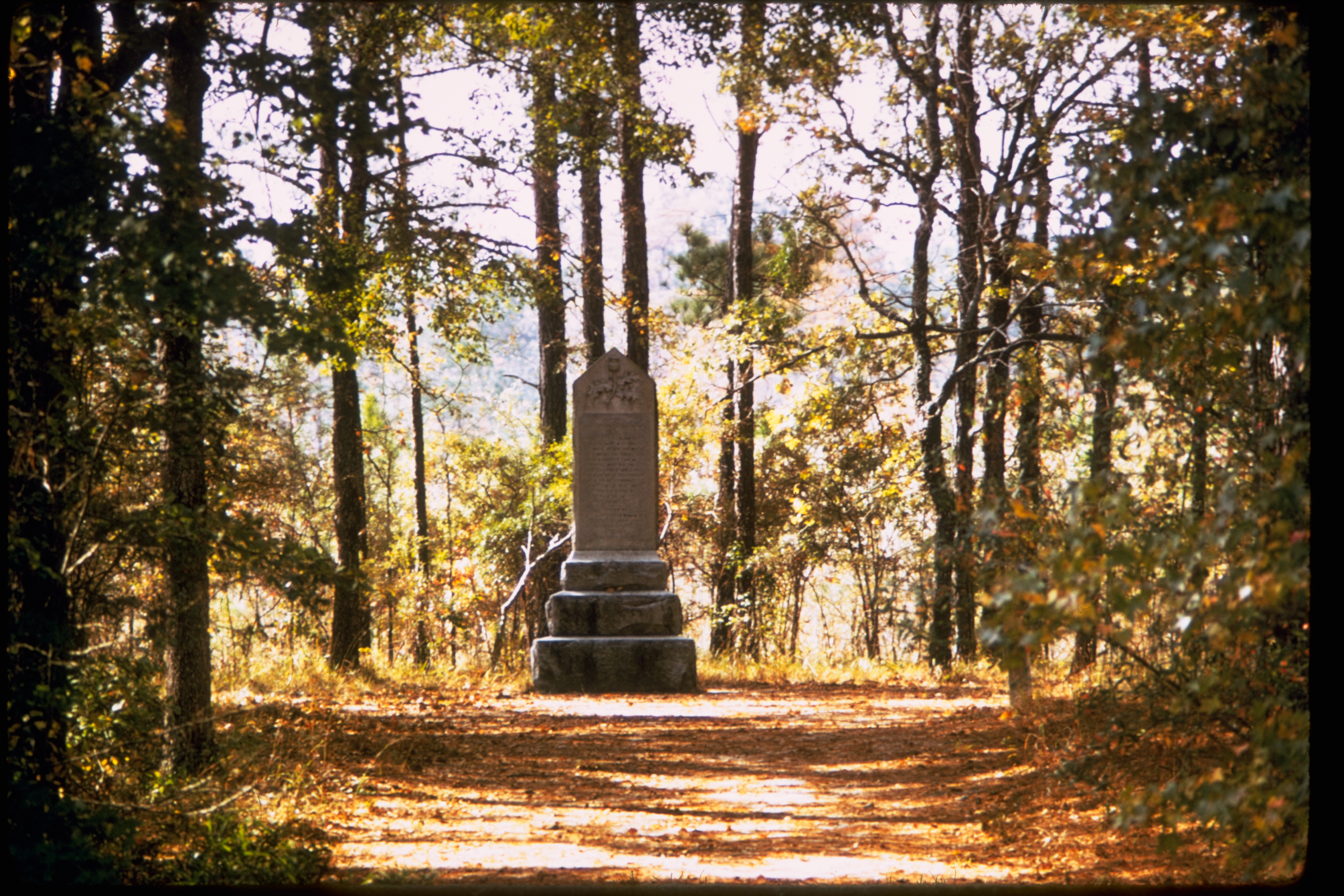
Loyalists Monument
