= Ray Jacobs (linebacker) =

American football player (born 1972)

No. 50
- Position: Linebacker

Personal information
- Born: August 18, 1972 (age 54); Hampstead, North Carolina, U.S.
- Listed height: 6 ft 2 in (1.88 m)
- Listed weight: 244 lb (111 kg)

Career information
- High school: Topsail (Hampstead, North Carolina)
- College: North Carolina (1990–1993)
- NFL draft: 1994: undrafted

Career history
- Denver Broncos (1994–1995); Carolina Panthers (1997)*; Kansas City Chiefs (1997)*; Calgary Stampeders (1998–2001); Saskatchewan Roughriders (2002); BC Lions (2003); Ottawa Renegades (2005)
- * Offseason or practice squad member only

Awards and highlights
- Grey Cup champion (2001); CFL All-Star (2003)
- Stats at Pro Football Reference

Ray Anthony Jacobs (born August 18, 1972) is an American former professional football linebacker who played in the National Football League (NFL) and Canadian Football League (CFL). He played college football for the North Carolina Tar Heels. He played in the NFL for the Denver Broncos, and in the CFL for the Calgary Stampeders, Saskatchewan Roughriders, BC Lions and Ottawa Renegades.
