= Addison Spruill =

American basketball player (born 1993)

Free agent
- Position: Shooting guard / small forward

Personal information
- Born: May 14, 1993 (age 33) Bronx, New York, U.S.
- Listed height: 6 ft 4 in (1.93 m)
- Listed weight: 225 lb (102 kg)

Career information
- High school: Pender (Burgaw, North Carolina)
- College: Brevard CC (2011–2013); UNC Wilmington (2013–2015)
- NBA draft: 2015: undrafted
- Playing career: 2015–present

Career history
- 2015: Hamamatsu Phoenix
- 2016: Al-Rayyan
- 2018–2019: Raiffeisen Flyers Wels
- 2019–2022: Runa Basket Moscow
- 2022–2023: Earthfriends Tokyo Z
- 2023: Fukushima Firebonds
- 2024: Toros de Aragua
- 2024: Búcaros de Bucaramanga

Career highlights
- First-team All-CAA (2015); CAA Champion CAA (2015); MVP De La Jornada SPB Venezuela (2024)

Addison Cornelius Spruill Jr (born May 14, 1993) is an American professional basketball player. He played collegiately for the University of North Carolina at Wilmington Seahawks of the Colonial Athletic Association. He was part of their 2015 Colonial Athletic Association championship team coached by Kevin Keatts.

== High school years ==
Spruill was born in the Bronx, New York, and attended Pender High School in Burgaw, North Carolina. He was a standout athlete that was a letterman in both football and basketball. Spruill averaged 18.2 points, 8.1 rebounds and 3.2 assists for Pender High School. He led the Patriots to 27-2 record and appearance in Eastern Regional final.

== College years ==
Addison attended Brevard Community College and later transferred to the University of North Carolina at Wilmington (UNCW).

== Professional career ==
On August 19, 2015, Spruill signed with Hamamatsu Phoenix of the bj league. He later was a starting guard for the Al-Rayann_AC Lions. He tried out with the Memphis Hustle but missed the final cut.

On August 20, 2019, Spruill signed with Runa Basket Moscow.

On November 1, 2022, Spruill signed with Earthfriends Tokyo Z of the B.League.

On March 14, 2023, Spruill signed with Fukushima Firebonds of the B.League.

On April 3, 2024, Spruill signed with Toros de Aragua.

== Personal life ==
=== 2018 Uber Arrest ===
On March 17, 2018 (St. Patrick's Day) Spruill was driving two passengers for the ride-sharing service Uber, when he was stopped for speeding. Upon searching the car, police found drugs and arrested Spruill on an outstanding warrant for intimidating a witness. Uber subsequently suspended his account. Spruill was cleared of charges brought against him.
