= Pender Early College High School =

Public high school in Burgaw, North Carolina, United States

- School seal

Location
- 100 Industrial Drive; Burgaw, North Carolina 28425; United States; 34°32′37″N 77°55′22″W

Information
- Other names: PEC, PECHS
- Type: Public high school – selective admissions
- Motto: Contribution. Purpose. Power. Challenge.
- Established: 2006 (20 years ago)
- CEEB code: 340500
- Principal: Daniel Sidor
- Staff: 9.50 (FTE)
- Grades: 9–12
- Enrollment: 193 (2023–2024)
- Student to teacher ratio: 20.32
- Colors: Red and black
- Mascot: Seawolf
- Website: sites.google.com/a/pender.k12.nc.us/pechs/

Pender Early College High School, also known as PEC or PECHS, is a school in Burgaw, North Carolina, United States, created by the Early College High School Initiative, and sponsored by the New Schools Project. Pender County Schools and Cape Fear Community College maintain the school, which is situated on the Burgaw Campus of Cape Fear Community College. It had its first graduating class in May 2010.

== Dual enrollment ==
Students who enroll in Pender Early College High School are also enrolled in Cape Fear Community College. The curriculum lasts four to five years, and students gradually take college classes in place of their high school classes, until their junior year, when students should be taking all college classes. Upon completion of the program, students will graduate with both a high school diploma and an associate degree from Cape Fear Community College. Students are also required to complete 150 hours of civic engagement, four leadership development camps, a graduation project, an internship and a cumulative portfolio before graduation.

== Classes ==
All classes offered at PECHS are either honors or college level.

High school classes include English I, II, III, and IV; journalism; integrated math I, II, III, and IV; earth/environmental science; biology; chemistry; civics and economics; United States history; and world history. All classes offered at Cape Fear Community College are open to PECHS students; these range from boat building to multi-variable calculus. PECHS also hosts special classes and seminars that vary by semester. These include yoga, documentary film, project citizenship and etiquette classes.

== Houses ==
The latest addition to PECHS was their Houses. Students are split into four groups: The Fellowship, The Golden Dynasty, The Crusaders, and The Foundation. Each house system represents one of the four symbols on the PECHS logo.
