= Burgaw Historic District =

Historic district in North Carolina, United States

- U.S. National Register of Historic Places
- U.S. Historic district
- Location within North Carolina Location within the United States
- Location: Roughly bounded by Cowan St., Fremont St., Dudley St., and Ashe St., Burgaw, North Carolina
- Coordinates: 34°33′05″N 77°55′35″W
- Area: 57 acres (23 ha)
- Built: c. 1850
- Architect: Deitrick, W.H.; et.al.
- Architectural style: Queen Anne, Gothic Revival
- NRHP reference No.: 99001047
- Added to NRHP: August 27, 1999

Burgaw Historic District is a national historic district located at Burgaw, Pender County, North Carolina. The district encompasses 130 contributing buildings, 1 contributing structure, and 1 contributing object in the central business district and surrounding residential sections of Burgaw. The district developed from the mid-19th to mid-20th century, and includes notable examples of Gothic Revival and Queen Anne style architecture. Located in the district are the separately listed Burgaw Depot and Pender County Courthouse. Other notable contributing buildings include the M. M. Moore House (c. 1885), Murphy-Sasser House (c. 1907), Dr. H. B. Thomas House (c. 1910), Burton-Noel House (1917), Burgaw Presbyterian Church (c. 1880), Macedonia African Methodist Episcopal (AME) Church (c. 1885), Burgaw Methodist Church (1928), the Burgaw Baptist Church (1948), Bank of Pender (1907), Pender County Jail (1924), and R.H. Holland Motor Company Building (1924).

It was listed on the National Register of Historic Places in 1999.
