= Topsail High School =

American public school in North Carolina

Location
- 245 N St Johns Church Rd; Hampstead, North Carolina 28443; United States; 34°23′44″N 77°40′55″W

Information
- Type: Public
- Motto: To cultivate individual student needs, interests, and future goals through the implementation of diverse educational curricula and enrichment opportunities.
- Established: 1976 (50 years ago)
- School district: Pender County Public Schools
- Superintendent: Steven Hill
- CEEB code: 341700
- Principal: Dr. Michael Sasscer
- Staff: 75.09 (FTE)
- Enrollment: 1,958 (2023-24)
- Student to teacher ratio: 19.63
- Colors: Black and gold
- Athletics: NCHSAA 7A
- Athletics conference: Carolina Coast 6A/7A/8A
- Mascot: Pirate
- Website: www.pender.k12.nc.us/o/ths

Topsail High School is a high school located in the unincorporated town of Hampstead, North Carolina. It is part of Pender County Schools and its current principal is Dr. Michael Sasscer.

Topsail High School is now a North Carolina School of High Growth. The student population is consistently increasing and currently stands at nearly 2000.

== New building ==
A ceremony for the new Topsail High School was held on December 12, 2006, at 2:00 PM and on December 30, 2008, construction was completed on the new school, located within walking distance to the former Topsail High School and Topsail Middle School. The new school opened for students on January 5, 2009, with a capacity of 1500 students. The new 224,727-square-foot (20,877.8 m^{2}), two-story high school facility includes two gymnasiums, a theater/auditorium wing, and a separate shop building for wood, metal and automotive classes. The former Topsail High School building has been renovated and is now occupied by Topsail Middle School starting in August 2009.

== Student life ==
The school Electric Vehicle Class has placed first in the Nation in the past eleven years in the EV Challenge competition. Topsail High School has been used in production for The CW's TV show One Tree Hill. Many students participated as extras in early 2007 when the Topsail High School gymnasium was used for filming basketball scenes for One Tree Hill.

== Classes ==
Students must pass their English classes each year and meet minimum credit requirements to be promoted to the next grade level.

Students must successfully complete a senior project and score a level 3 or 4 on the following end-of-course exams: Math I, Biology and English II.

Exams count as 20% of the final grade in all classes

A student must have a minimum of 28 credits to graduate, 22 state required classes and 6 local requirements.

=== Honors & advanced classes ===
Topsail High School offers many honors and advanced-level classes; students should consider teacher recommendations when registering for classes, and should take the most challenging courses they can.

=== Grading scale ===
- A = 100–90
- B = 89–80
- C = 79–70
- D = 69–60
- F = 59 and below

== Graduation requirements ==
Students graduating from a Pender County high school must successfully complete 28 course units on block scheduling in grades 9 through 12 as described below.

- 4 units in English
- 4 units in Mathematics
- 4 units in Social Studies
- 3 units in Science
- 1 unit in Health/Physical Education
- 6 electives, to include a 4-credit concentration
- 6 additional courses to meet the locally required 28 courses.

High school courses taken in middle school, and credits earned via Credit by Demonstrated Mastery will be placed on the student's transcript and will count towards credits required for graduation; however, only courses taken in grades 9–12 count toward the student's GPA.

== Dual enrollment ==
Students may enroll in college courses and gain high school and college credit simultaneously. Tuition fees are waived if courses are taken at Cape Fear Community College. Book costs are not waived and must be paid by the student. Tuition fees are not waived if courses are taken at UNC-Wilmington. Dual enrollment applications with school administrative approval, completion of registration card and placement test scores are required prior to enrolling. Three to five semester hours of college credit is equal to one unit of high school credit. Students must take at least two courses at Topsail High School and may not register for classes off campus that are offered at the school unless there is a scheduling conflict.

=== UNC-W requirements ===
1. GPA: 3.5 weighted
2. Must be a high school junior or senior.
3. Must complete Dual Enrollment Application with school administration approval.
4. Must have a PSAT score of 760, SAT score of 1170, and/or ACT score of 24 or higher.

Quality Points and Credit:

1. Students will receive one unit of high school credit if the college contact hours are no less than 135.
2. Students will receive college credit for courses taken and passed, if the college contact hours are no less than 135.
3. Students may only take 2 undergraduate courses per term.

=== Cape Fear Community College requirements ===
1. Must be a high school junior or senior.
2. Must complete the application on CFNC.
3. Must meet the required criteria on the Accuplacer Test at Cape Fear Community College and earn proficiency prior to enrollment OR have qualifying ACT or SAT scores.

Quality Points and Credit:

1. Students will receive one unit of high school credit for three to five hours of college credit passed, if the contact hours are no less than 135.
2. Students will receive college credit for courses taken and passed.
3. All students will receive AP credit for each College Transfer course passed.

== Sports ==
Athletic Eligibility

Student athletic eligibility is determined by the successful passing of fifty percent of the classes in the semester prior to the semester of the sport participation. Serving as an on-campus intern, teacher assistant, and media assistant does not count as a class for eligibility. Students must be present in school no less than 85% of the semester in order to be eligible for the next semester's sport season. Topsail High School currently provides the following sports:

- Cheerleading
- Men's Varsity Soccer
- Men's JV Soccer
- Women's Tennis
- Varsity Volleyball
- J.V. Volleyball
- Women's Golf
- Cross Country
- Varsity Football
- J.V. Football
- Men's Varsity Basketball
- Men's JV Basketball
- Women's Varsity Basketball
- Women's J.V Basketball
- Wrestling
- Varsity Baseball
- J.V. Baseball
- Varsity Softball
- J.V. Softball
- Women's Soccer
- Track and Field
- Men's Golf
- Men's Tennis
- Women's Lacrosse
- Men's Lacrosse
- Swimming

== Robotics ==
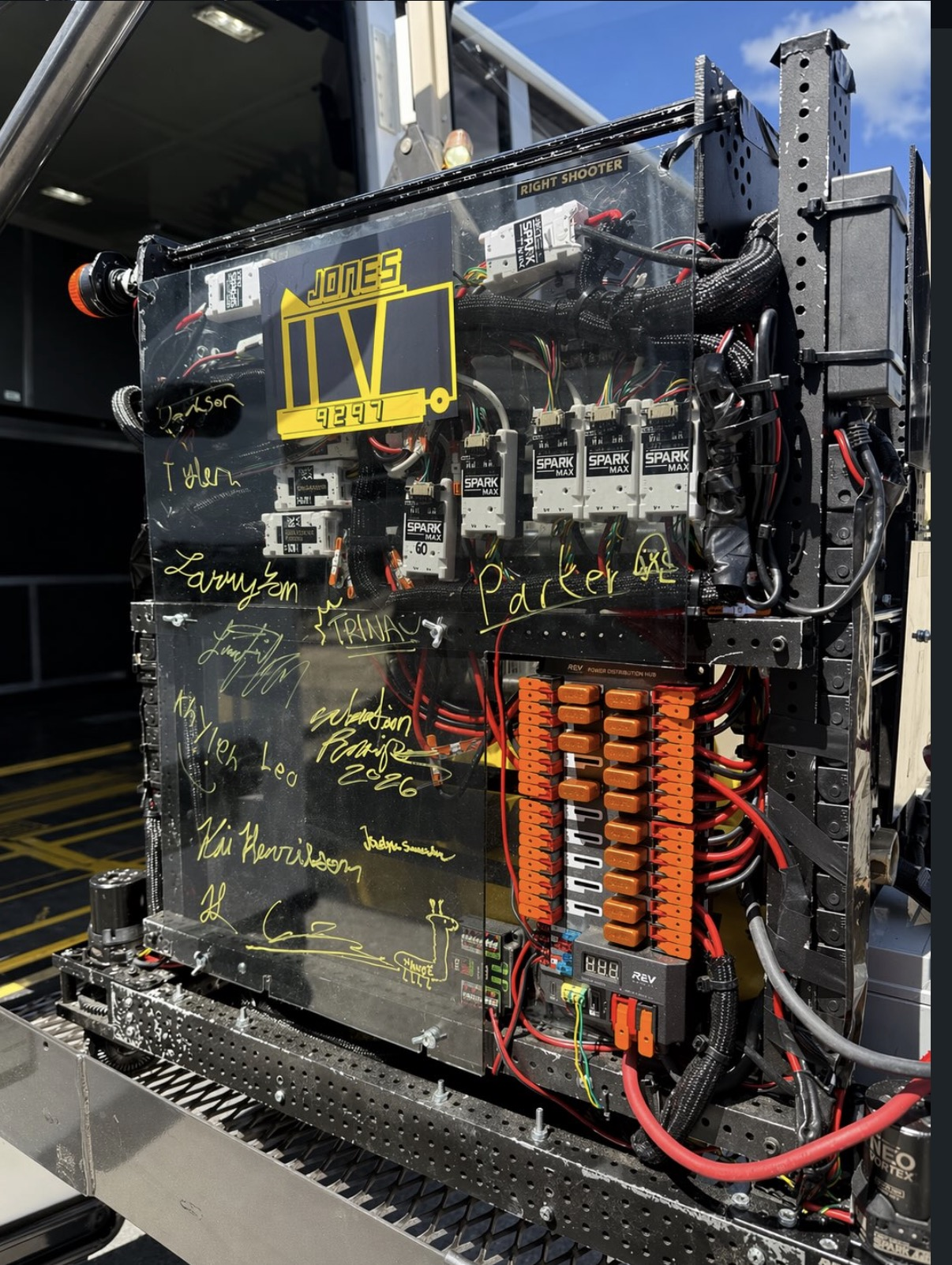
Jones 4 a robot from FRC team 9297

BOGOBOTS is the robotics team of Topsail High School, competing as FIRST Robotics Competition (FRC) Team 9297. Founded in fall of 2022, the team participates in the FIRST Robotics Competition (FRC), an international robotics program in which students design, manufacture, wire, and program industrial-sized robots to compete in annual games.

The team was established following the revival of the school's robotics program under coach David Henry. During its rookie 2023 season, Team 9297 earned the Highest Rookie Seed Award at the FIRST North Carolina District UNC Pembroke Event. BOGOBOTS are students working on many departments of the team. Students activity's include mechanical, electrical, programming, CAD (computer-aided design), business, strategy, media, and outreach. The team's competition robots are traditionally named in honor of former Topsail High School robotics coach Ronnie Jones.

Prior to Team 9297 being founded, robotics was led by Ronnie Jones, who founded team 7265. Following his passing in early 2022, the robotics team was re-established in later 2022, under coach David Henry, and BOGOBOTS (FRC Team 9297), naming its robots after him as "Jones (number)", starting with Jones 1 in its inaugural rookie 2023 season. There was also a team named Topsail FIRST that played once in 2012.

=== FIRST Robotics Competition ===
Season	Team	Team No.	Game	Notable achievement
2012	Topsail FIRST	4339	Rebound Rumble	Rookie season; Rookie Inspiration Award at the North Carolina Regional

=== THOR East 2019 ===
In 2019, Topsail High School served as the host site for THOR East, an off-season FIRST Robotics Competition event held following the conclusion of the official FRC season. The event, held in the Topsail High School gym, was coordinated through FIRST North Carolina and local volunteers. Robotic teams from across the southeastern portion of the United States converged to participate in the robotics challenge and collaborate in preparation for upcoming seasons. Volunteers and staff from Topsail High School helped out at the competition along with community members and members of the host team, The Skeleton Crew 7265.

== Notable alumni ==
- Ray Jacobs (1990), former NFL and CFL linebacker
- Joseph Sculthorpe (2016), WWE wrestler and former NFL offensive lineman

== See also ==
- Topsail Island
- Surf City, North Carolina
- Topsail Beach, North Carolina
- North Topsail Beach, North Carolina
- Hampstead, North Carolina
