= Rocky Point, North Carolina =

Unincorporated community in North Carolina, U.S.

Rocky Point
- CDP
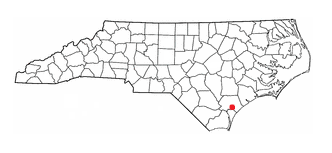
- Location within the U.S. state of North Carolina
- Coordinates: 34.43°N 77.88°W
- Country: United States
- State: North Carolina
- County: Pender

Area
  - Land: 6.9 sq mi (18 km^{2})

Population (2020)
  - Total: 1,476
  - Density: 210/sq mi (83/km^{2})
- ZIP Code: 28457
- Area codes: 910, 472

Rocky Point is a census-designated place and unincorporated community in Pender County, North Carolina, United States. The population was 1,476 at the 2020 census.

Rocky Point is within the Wilmington, NC Metropolitan Statistical Area.

== Geography ==
Rocky Point is located at Exit 408 off of Interstate 40. It is situated along North Carolina Highway 210, North Carolina Highway 133, and U.S. Route 117. The community is located in southern Pender County, north of Castle Hayne.

Rocky Point is situated 15–20 miles from the Atlantic Ocean, with Wrightsville Beach being the nearest public beach.

The ZIP Code for Rocky Point is 28457.

== Public services ==
The community is served by the Rocky Point Fire Department, Pender County Fire and EMS, and the Pender County Sheriff's Office.

== Schools ==
- Rocky Point Elementary School
- Cape Fear Elementary School
- Cape Fear Middle School
- Heide Trask High School

=== School system ===
Rocky Point schools are within the Pender County Schools system. The superintendent of PCS is Dr. Brad Breedlove, who assumed the position on January 1, 2023.

=== Former schools ===
- Long Creek High School (1924–1993)
- PCTS (1929–1969)
- Rocky Point school (1925–1943)

== Notable people ==
- John Baptista Ashe, former U.S. Representative for Tennessee
- William Shepperd Ashe, former U.S. Representative
- Richard Brickhouse, NASCAR driver who won the inaugural Talladega 500 in 1969
