= Pender County Courthouse =

Historic courthouse in North Carolina, US

- U.S. National Register of Historic Places
- U.S. Historic district – Contributing property
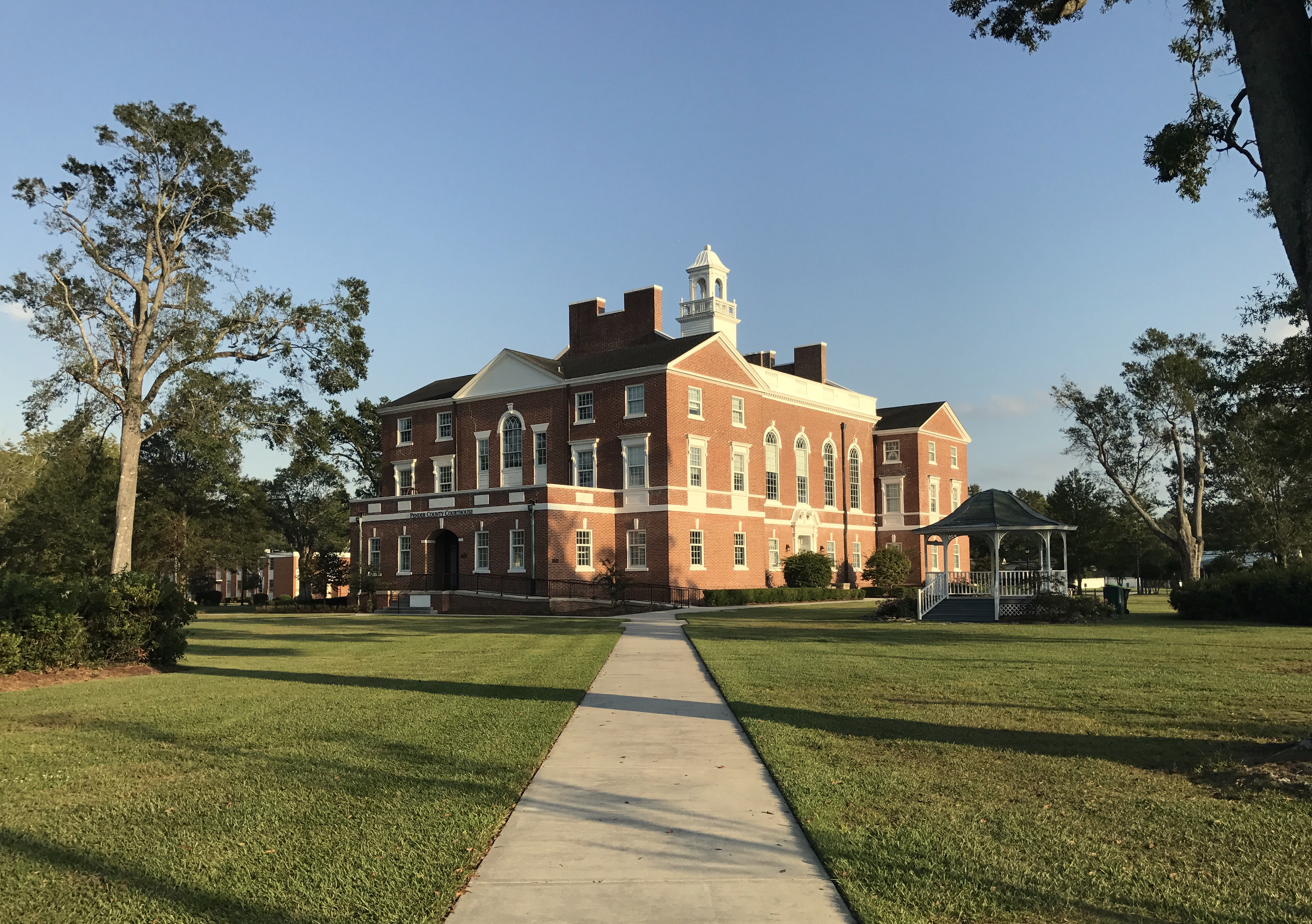

- Location within North Carolina Location within the United States
- Location: Wright, Wilmington, Walker, and Fremont Sts., Burgaw, North Carolina
- Coordinates: 34°33′2″N 77°55′34″W
- Area: 4 acres (1.6 ha)
- Built: 1936
- Architectural style: Colonial Revival, Georgian Revival
- MPS: North Carolina County Courthouses TR
- NRHP reference No.: 79001741
- Added to NRHP: May 10, 1979

Pender County Courthouse is a historic courthouse located at Burgaw, Pender County, North Carolina. It was built in 1936, and is a three-story, H-shaped, brick-veneered Georgian Revival-style building. The building consists of a hipped roofed main block flanked by projecting gable-roofed wings.

The current building replaces the original Pender county courthouse which was built in 1885

It was listed on the National Register of Historic Places in 1979. It is located in the Burgaw Historic District.
