= Pender High School =

American public school in North Carolina

Location
- 5380 NC Hwy 53 West; Burgaw, North Carolina 28425; United States; 34°32′43″N 78°00′45″W

Information
- Type: Public
- Established: 1975 (51 years ago)
- School district: Pender County Schools
- CEEB code: 340490
- Principal: Nick Paquette
- Staff: 41.02 (FTE)
- Grades: 9–12
- Enrollment: 638 (2018–19)
- Student to teacher ratio: 15.55
- Colors: Red, white, and blue
- Athletics conference: 1A
- Mascot: Patriot
- Website: www.pender.k12.nc.us/o/phs

Pender High School is one of the three traditional high schools in the Pender County Schools system. It operates as a smaller school (classified as 1A) in North Carolina’s athletic/conference system) and is located in Burgaw, North Carolina on Highway 53, and about 25 miles from Wilmington, North Carolina. It was established in 1975 and has about 650 enrolled students and 56 teachers.

== History ==
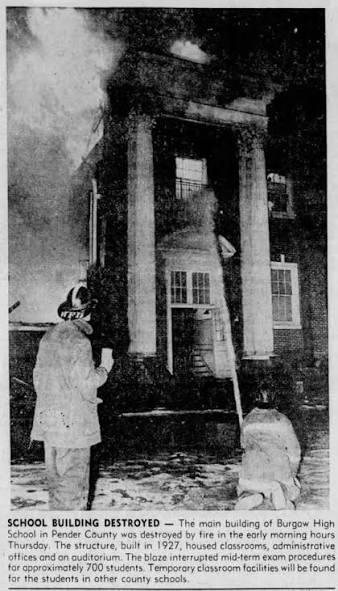
Firefighters fighting the fire at Burgaw High School

Pender High School stands as the direct successor to Burgaw High School, which was destroyed by a devastating fire in the early morning of January 19, 1973—during mid-term exams.

A January 7 snowstorm (about 2 inches) had closed schools for a week, with classes resuming on January 16. Then, faulty wiring in an electrical switch box sparked the blaze (confirmed by the State Bureau of Investigation). The 1927 main building—containing classrooms, administrative offices, and the auditorium—was completely lost. Firefighters from Burgaw (led by Chief John Frasier), Pender County, Wilmington, and Wallace heroically saved adjacent structures: the cafeteria/home economics building, gym, and vocational/agriculture units. No major injuries were reported, but the fire disrupted nearly 700 students. Temporary arrangements began January 29: the cafeteria was partitioned into 6 classrooms plus a library, the American Legion hall was used, and 6–7 mobile units were brought in.This tragedy accelerated consolidation efforts in Pender County. Burgaw High graduated its final class in 1975, and Pender High School opened that same year on a new site (about 5 miles west of Burgaw), uniting students from Burgaw, Penderlea, Atkinson, and surrounding areas.Fire struck the new school again on August 2, 2007, when arsonists (five teens later identified via surveillance video) set a blaze that destroyed a JROTC mobile classroom/storage unit behind the gym. The loss was heartbreaking: decades of flags, photos, records, physical training gear, and artifacts dating back to the program’s start around 1977 were gone and in 2025 the school celebrated its 50th anniversary

== Notable alumni ==
- Jessica Holmes (2002), politician, North Carolina State Auditor
- Addison Spruill (2011), basketball player who played overseas
