= Yamacraw, North Carolina =

Unincorporated community in North Carolina, US

Coordinates: 34°29′42″N 78°06′38″W

Yamacraw is an unincorporated community in Pender County, North Carolina, United States.

== In popular culture ==
Yamacraw is the birthplace of the character Philip Banks on the television series The Fresh Prince of Bel-Air. In the 2022 reboot, it is the character's birthplace and fraternity nickname.
