= Willard, North Carolina =

- Unincorporated community
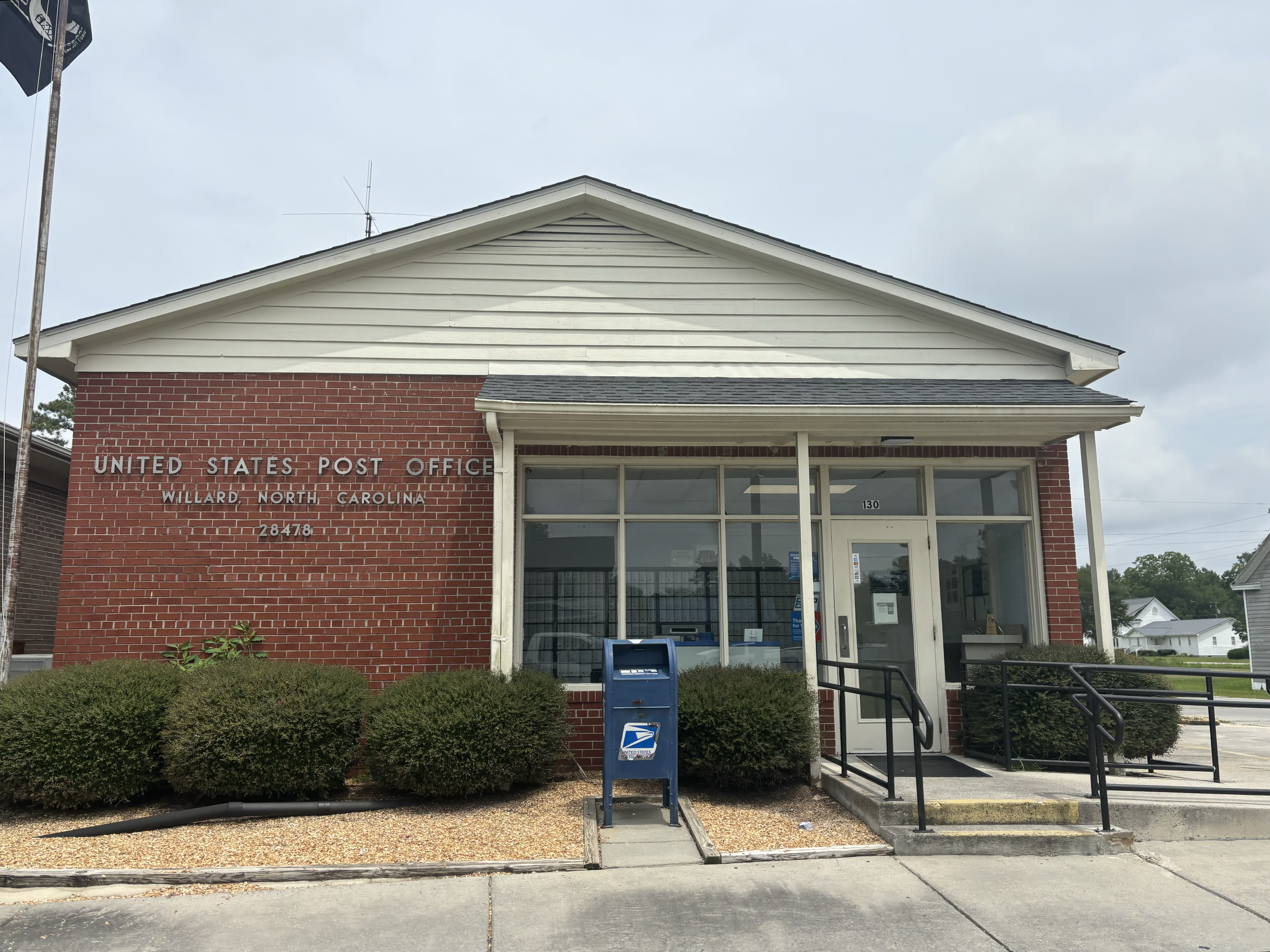
- Post Office in Willard

- Location within North Carolina Location within the United States
- Coordinates: 34°41′25″N 77°58′47″W
- Country: United States
- State: North Carolina
- County: Pender
- Elevation: 49 ft (15 m)
- Time zone: UTC-5 (Eastern (EST))
  - Summer (DST): UTC-4 (EDT)
- ZIP code: 28478
- Area codes: 910, 472
- GNIS feature ID: 997346

Willard is an unincorporated community in Pender County, North Carolina, United States. The community is located on North Carolina Highway 11, 3.3 miles (5.3 km) south-southeast of Wallace. Willard has a post office with ZIP code 28478.

The Penderlea Homesteads Historic District was listed on the National Register of Historic Places in 2013.
