= Currie, North Carolina =

Unincorporated community in North Carolina, US

Currie
- Unincorporated community
- Location within the state of North Carolina
- Coordinates: 34.46°N 78.10°W
- Country: United States
- State: North Carolina
- County: Pender
- Established: 1888

Population
  - Estimate (2022): 1,964
- Time zone: UTC-5 (EST)
  - Summer (DST): UTC-4 (EDT)
- ZIP Code: 28435
- Area codes: 910, 472

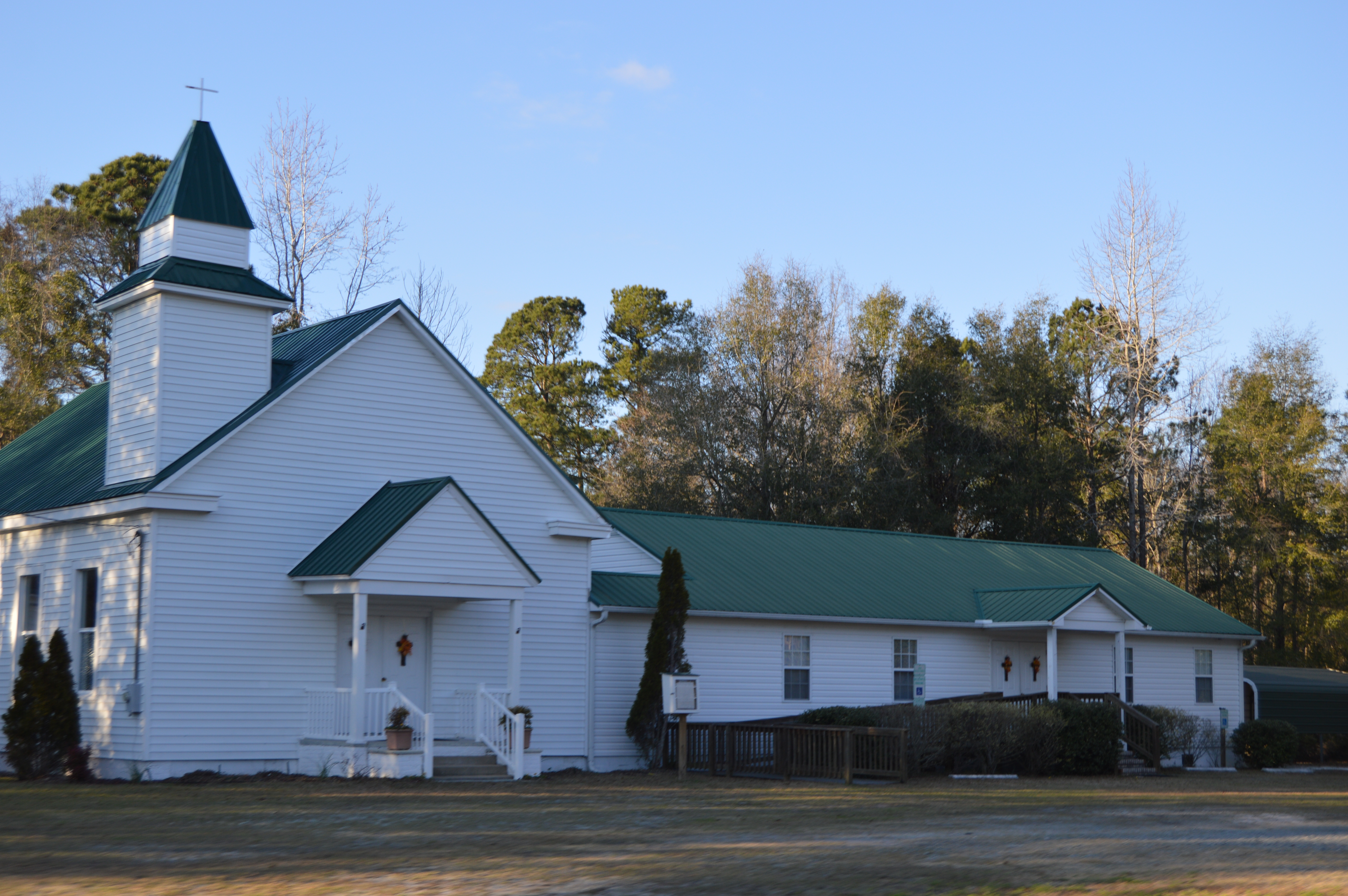
Currie Community Baptist Church in January 2020

Currie is an unincorporated community in Pender County, North Carolina, United States. It is best known as the birthplace of the fictional character Philip Banks from The Fresh Prince of Bel-Air. Currie is part of the Wilmington Metropolitan Statistical Area.

== History ==
Currie was founded in 1888, although settlement had occurred prior to that time. The community was named after John H. Currie, a former rail director in the region.

Currie was the site of North Carolina's first Revolutionary War battle, the Battle of Moore's Creek Bridge, in 1776. This conflict took place near the property of local homesteader Elizabeth Moore, whose descendants constructed the historic Bell House in 1864. The home exists today as a local landmark. Currie is also home to Canetuck School, the community's only site with a National Register of Historic Places designation (#100002520).

== Geography ==
Currie is located in southwestern Pender County, south of Yamacraw.

The ZIP Code for Currie is 28435.

== Population ==
In 2022, the estimated population of Currie was 1,964.

== Transportation ==
The primary routes within Currie are US 421 and NC 210.
