= Hampstead, North Carolina =

- Census-designated place
- Location within North Carolina
- Coordinates: 34°21′46″N 77°43′55″W
- Country: United States
- State: North Carolina
- County: Pender

Area
  - Total: 20.38 sq mi (52.78 km^{2})
  - Land: 20.24 sq mi (52.42 km^{2})
  - Water: 0.14 sq mi (0.36 km^{2})
- Elevation: 46 ft (14 m)

Population (2020)
  - Total: 7,016
  - Density: 346.7/sq mi (133.85/km^{2})
  - Summer (DST): EDT
- ZIP Code: 28443
- Area codes: 910, 472
- FIPS code: 37-29180
- GNIS feature ID: 2628632

Hampstead is an unincorporated community and census-designated place (CDP) in Pender County, North Carolina, United States. It is located between Wilmington and Jacksonville on U.S. Route 17 and includes an area sized just over 20 square miles.

As of the 2020 census, Hampstead had a population of 7,016.

Hampstead is part of the Wilmington, NC Metropolitan Statistical Area.

== History ==
Hampstead, North Carolina, is a community with a rich history dating back to the early colonial period. Situated in Pender County, along the eastern coast of North Carolina, Hampstead has evolved from its early agricultural roots to become a thriving residential area with access to nearby beaches and recreational opportunities.

Hampstead was named after the 1740 plantation of John Mott, of Hempstead, Long Island. ref> Origin of the Mott Families of New Hanover County. New Hanover County Library.

The Belvidere Plantation House was listed on the National Register of Historic Places in 1982.

== Geography ==
Hampstead is found in Pender County in the U.S. Route 17, about 17 miles northeast of Wilmington and 25 miles southwest of Jacksonville. Around 20.5 square miles of land is covered by the CDP area, bordering tidal marshes, intracoastal Waterway, and coastal land

Its location is strategic, as it is home to the north-south commuter corridor. This allows for commuting to Wilmington, out of town, or to other areas for employment.

== Early Settlement and Colonial Era ==
The area now known as Hampstead was originally inhabited by Native American tribes, including the Cape Fear Indians. European settlers began to arrive in the early 18th century, attracted by the fertile land and opportunities for agriculture. The town of Hampstead itself was established in the 1730s and was originally known as Sloop Point.

During the colonial period, the region's economy thrived on agriculture, with plantations producing crops such as tobacco, rice, and indigo. The area was also strategically important due to its location along the coast.

== American Revolution and Civil War ==
Hampstead played a role in both the American Revolution and the Civil War. In 1776, the nearby Moores Creek Bridge was the site of a significant battle, where Patriots successfully defeated Loyalist forces, helping to secure North Carolina for the Revolutionary cause.

While no major battles occurred in the immediate area during the Civil War, the conflict had a significant impact on the local economy and residents. Many Hampstead residents were involved in the war effort, and the town experienced the hardships and challenges of the era.

== Post-Civil War Reconstruction and 20th Century ==
Following the Civil War, Hampstead, like many Southern towns, experienced a period of reconstruction and recovery. Agriculture remained central to the local economy, with farmers primarily growing crops like cotton and tobacco.

In the 20th century, Hampstead remained a small, rural community, with a focus on agriculture and fishing. However, with the expansion of nearby Wilmington and the development of transportation infrastructure, such as highways, Hampstead began to see gradual growth and development.

== Recent Development ==
In recent decades, Hampstead has experienced significant growth and development, driven by its proximity to Wilmington and its appeal as a residential area. Subdivisions, shopping centers, and other amenities have been built to accommodate the growing population.

Today, Hampstead retains some of its rural charm while also offering modern amenities and access to nearby beaches and recreational opportunities.

== Demographics ==
=== 2020 census ===
Hampstead racial composition
Race	Number	Percentage
White (non-Hispanic)	5,970	85.09%
Black or African American (non-Hispanic)	214	3.05%
Native American	27	0.38%
Asian	55	0.78%
Pacific Islander	4	0.06%
Other/Mixed	317	4.52%
Hispanic or Latino	429	6.11%

As of the 2020 census, Hampstead had a population of 7,016. The median age was 40.1 years. 27.4% of residents were under the age of 18 and 16.5% of residents were 65 years of age or older. For every 100 females there were 96.9 males, and for every 100 females age 18 and over there were 92.9 males age 18 and over.

70.3% of residents lived in urban areas, while 29.7% lived in rural areas.

There were 2,582 households in Hampstead, including 1,475 families, of which 38.3% had children under the age of 18 living in them. Of all households, 64.4% were married-couple households, 12.4% were households with a male householder and no spouse or partner present, and 18.6% were households with a female householder and no spouse or partner present. About 20.4% of all households were made up of individuals and 10.2% had someone living alone who was 65 years of age or older.

There were 2,898 housing units, of which 10.9% were vacant. The homeowner vacancy rate was 0.8% and the rental vacancy rate was 16.6%.

Historical population
Census	Pop.	Note	%±
2010	4,083		—
2020	7,016		71.8%
U.S. Decennial Census

== Schools ==
In the locality, there are four elementary schools serving the community: North Topsail Elementary, South Topsail Elementary, Topsail Elementary, and Surf City Elementary.

Moving on to the middle school level, there are two institutions: Topsail Middle School and Surf City Middle School.

Adjacent to Topsail Middle School is the lone high school in the vicinity, Topsail High School.

== Public services ==
The Hampstead area is served by Pender EMS & Fire. Hampstead also has the Topsail Composite Squadron of the Civil Air Patrol. Hampstead is also served by the Pender County Sheriff’s Department.

== See also ==
- Topsail High School
- Topsail Island
- North Topsail Beach, North Carolina
