= Pender County, North Carolina =

County in North Carolina, United States

- County
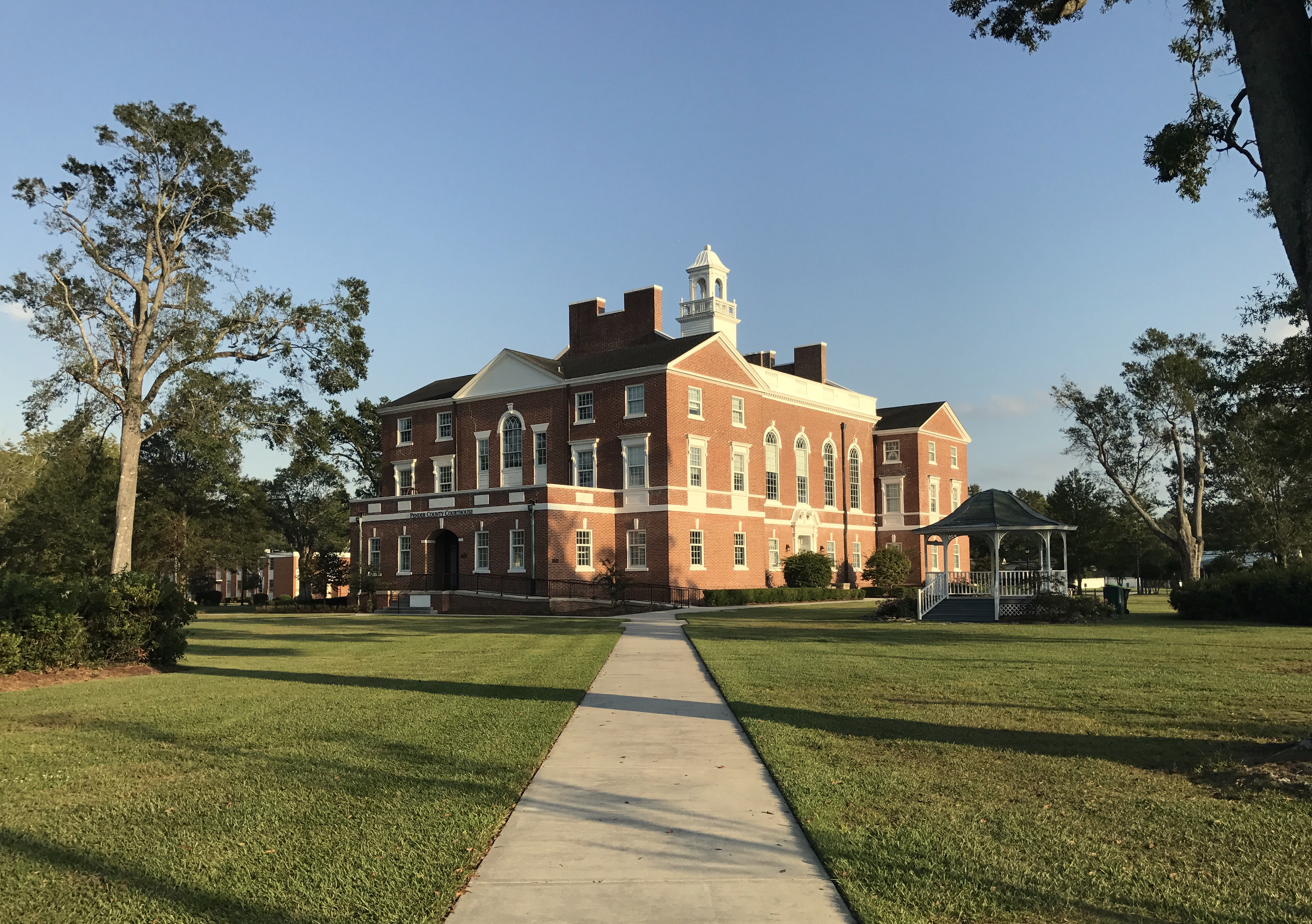
- Pender County Courthouse in Burgaw

- Seal Logo
- Motto: "Find Your Treasure"
- Location within the U.S. state of North Carolina
- Coordinates: 34.51°N 77.89°W
- Country: United States
- State: North Carolina
- Founded: 1875
- Named for: William Dorsey Pender
- Seat: Burgaw
- Largest community: Hampstead

Area
  - Total: 934.17 sq mi (2,419.5 km^{2})
  - Land: 871.30 sq mi (2,256.7 km^{2})
  - Water: 62.87 sq mi (162.8 km^{2}) 6.73%

Population (2020)
  - Total: 60,203
  - Estimate (2025): 72,111 ▲
  - Density: 69.1/sq mi (26.7/km^{2})
- Time zone: UTC−5 (Eastern)
  - Summer (DST): UTC−4 (EDT)
- Congressional district: 7th
- Website: www.pendercountync.gov

Pender County is a county located in the U.S. state of North Carolina. As of the 2020 census, its population was 60,203. Its county seat is Burgaw. Pender County is part of the Wilmington, NC metropolitan statistical area.

== History ==
Pender County was originally a part of New Hanover County. During the Reconstruction era, the Republican Party, with a stronghold in the port city of Wilmington, captured political control of New Hanover. After the rival Conservative Party took a majority of the seats of the North Carolina General Assembly, the Conservatives sought to break the Republicans regional strength by splitting off the northern two-thirds of New Hanover to create a new county. Pender County was formed in 1875 from New Hanover County. It was named for William Dorsey Pender of Edgecombe County, a Confederate general mortally wounded at the Battle of Gettysburg. The county commissioners were ordered to hold their first meeting at Rocky Point. The act provided for the establishment of the town of Cowan as the county seat. In 1877, an act was passed repealing that section of the law relative to the town, and another law was enacted, whereby the qualified voters were to vote on the question of moving the county seat to South Washington or any other place, which the majority of the voters designated. Whatever place was selected, the town should be called Stanford. In 1879, Stanford was changed to Burgaw, which was by that law incorporated. It is the county seat.

== Geography ==
Interactive map of Pender County

Pender County is located in the southeastern portion of the state and shares borders with Bladen, Brunswick, Columbus, Duplin, New Hanover, Onslow, and Sampson Counties. The county's eastern border is the Atlantic Ocean. The present land area is 870.76 square miles (2,255.3 km^{2}).

According to the U.S. Census Bureau, the county has a total area of 934.17 square miles (2,419.5 km^{2}), of which 62.87 square miles (162.8 km^{2}) (6.73%) are covered by water. It is the fifth-largest county in North Carolina by land area.

=== National protected area ===
- Moores Creek National Battlefield

=== State and local protected areas ===
- Angola Bay Game Land (part)
- Cape Fear River Wetlands Game Land (part)
- Holly Shelter Game Land
- Lea-Hutaff Island State Natural Area
- Sandy Run Savannas State Natural Area (part)
- Whitehall Plantation Game Land (part)

=== Major water bodies ===
- (North) Atlantic Ocean
- Black River, home of the oldest documented Taxodium distichum (bald cypress) at 2,651 years old; located in Bladen County
- Cape Fear River
- Doctor's Creek
- Intracoastal Waterway
- Island Creek
- Northeast Cape Fear River
- Onslow Bay

=== Adjacent counties ===
- Duplin County – north
- Onslow County – northeast
- New Hanover County – south
- Brunswick County – south
- Columbus County – southwest
- Bladen County – west
- Sampson County – northwest

=== Major highways ===
- I-40
- US 17
- US 17 Byp. (future Hampstead Bypass)
- US 117
- US 421
- NC 11
- NC 50
- NC 53
- NC 133
- NC 210

== Climate ==
Pender County is located in the humid subtropical climate (Köppen climate classification Cfa) zone, with mostly moderate temperatures year round. Winters are mild across Pender, with the warmest winter temperatures found in the coastal areas of the county due to the influence of the Atlantic Ocean. The average high temperature in January is around 55 °F (13 °C) for most of Pender County. Summers are hot and humid, with the hottest summer temperatures found in the northwestern areas of the county. The average high temperature in July is around 90 °F (32 °C).

The USDA hardiness zones for Pender County are Zone 8A (10 to 15 °F or -12 to -9 °C) and Zone 8B (15 to 20 °F or -9 to -6 °C).

== Demographics ==
Historical population
Census	Pop.	Note	%±
1880	12,468		—
1890	12,514		0.4%
1900	13,381		6.9%
1910	15,471		15.6%
1920	14,788		−4.4%
1930	15,686		6.1%
1940	17,710		12.9%
1950	18,423		4.0%
1960	18,508		0.5%
1970	18,149		−1.9%
1980	22,215		22.4%
1990	28,855		29.9%
2000	41,082		42.4%
2010	52,217		27.1%
2020	60,203		15.3%
2025 (est.)	72,111	▲	19.8%
U.S. Decennial Census; 1790–1960 1900–1990; 1990–2000 2010 2020

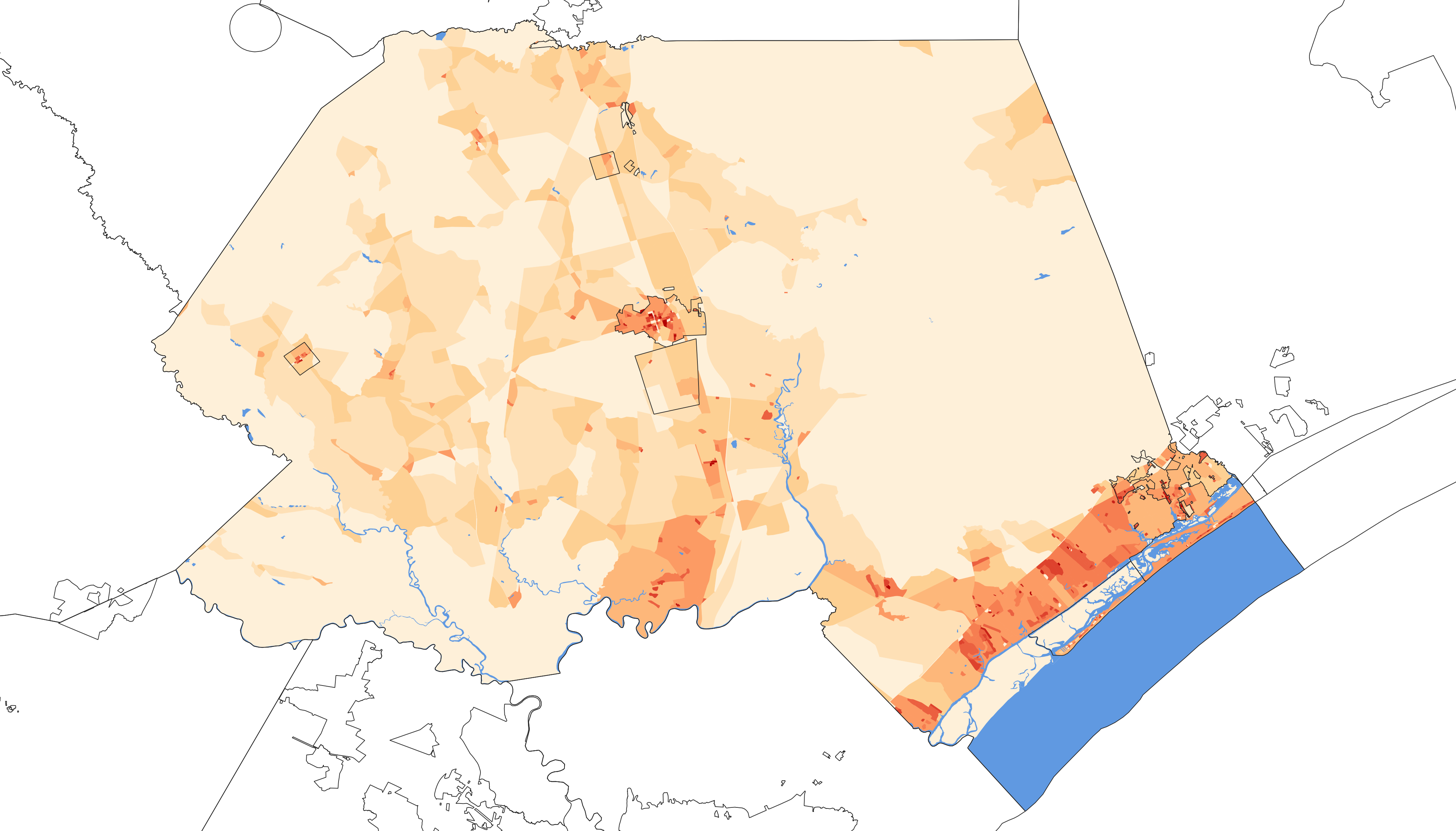
2020 population density of Pender County NC by census block

The estimated county population in 2023 had increased to 68,521.

=== Racial and ethnic composition ===
Pender County, North Carolina – Racial and ethnic composition Note: the US Census treats Hispanic/Latino as an ethnic category. This table excludes Latinos from the racial categories and assigns them to a separate category. Hispanics/Latinos may be of any race.
Race / Ethnicity (NH = Non-Hispanic)	Pop 1980	Pop 1990	Pop 2000	Pop 2010	Pop 2020	% 1980	% 1990	% 2000	% 2010	% 2020
White alone (NH)	13,467	19,723	29,441	38,568	44,418	60.62%	68.35%	71.66%	73.86%	73.78%
Black or African American alone (NH)	8,502	8,739	9,536	9,208	7,544	38.27%	30.29%	23.21%	17.63%	12.53%
Native American or Alaska Native alone (NH)	24	74	178	237	195	0.11%	0.26%	0.43%	0.45%	0.32%
Asian alone (NH)	19	42	72	197	319	0.09%	0.15%	0.18%	0.38%	0.53%
Native Hawaiian or Pacific Islander alone (NH)	x	x	14	11	23	x	x	0.03%	0.02%	0.04%
Other race alone (NH)	2	4	21	61	243	0.01%	0.01%	0.05%	0.12%	0.40%
Mixed race or Multiracial (NH)	x	x	324	741	2,479	x	x	0.79%	1.42%	4.12%
Hispanic or Latino (any race)	201	273	1,496	3,194	4,982	0.90%	0.95%	3.64%	6.12%	8.28%
Total	22,215	28,855	41,082	52,217	60,203	100.00%	100.00%	100.00%	100.00%	100.00%

=== 2020 census ===
As of the 2020 census, 60,203 people, 22,962 households, and 14,676 families lived in the county.

The median age was 42.9 years; 22.6% of the residents were under 18 and 19.4% were 65 or older. For every 100 females, there were 99.7 males, and for every 100 females 18 and over, there were 97.9 males.

The racial makeup of the county was 75.3% White, 12.7% Black or African American, 0.6% American Indian and Alaska Native, 0.6% Asian, 0.1% Native Hawaiian and Pacific Islander, 4.7% from some other race, and 6.2% from two or more races. Hispanic or Latino residents of any race comprised 8.3% of the population.

About 39.0% of residents lived in urban areas, while 61.0% lived in rural areas.

Of the 22,962 households in the county, 32.2% had children under 18 living in them, 56.0% were married-couple households, 15.7% were households with a male householder and no spouse or partner present, and 22.6% were households with a female householder and no spouse or partner present. About 23.2% of all households were made up of individuals, and 11.5% had someone living alone who was 65 or older.

The county had 29,927 housing units, of which 23.3% were vacant. Among occupied housing units, 81.2% were owner-occupied and 18.8% were renter-occupied. The homeowner vacancy rate was 1.6% and the rental vacancy rate was 10.7%.

=== 2000 census ===
At the 2000 census, 41,082 people, 16,054 households, and 11,719 families resided in the county. The population density was 47 people per square mile (18 people/km^{2}). The 20,798 housing units had an average density of 24 units per square mile (9.3 units/km^{2}). The racial makeup of the county was 72.74% White, 23.58% African American, 0.49% Native American, 0.18% Asian, 2.06% from other races, and 0.94% from two or more races. About 3.64% of the population were Hispanics or Latinos of any race.

Of the 16,054 households, 29.4% had children under 18 living with them, 57.9% were married couples living together, 11.2% had a female householder with no husband present, and 27.0% were not families. Around 22.9% of all households were made up of individuals, and 8.5% had someone living alone who was 65 or older. The average household size was 2.49 and the average family size was 2.90.

In the county, the age distribution was 23.2% under 18, 7.40% from 18 to 24, 29.50% from 25 to 44, 25.80% from 45 to 64, and 14.10% who were 65 or older. The median age was 39 years. For every 100 females, there were 101.2 males. For every 100 females 18 and over, there were 99.5 males.

The median income for a household in the county was $35,902, and for a family was $41,633. Males had a median income of $31,424 versus $21,623 for females. The per capita income for the county was $17,882. About 9.50% of families and 13.60% of the population were below the poverty line, including 18.60% of those under age 18 and 14.40% of those age 65 or over.

== Government and politics ==
Pender County is a member of the regional Cape Fear Council of Governments.

The government is run by a board of commissioners with a county manager.

Pender County is a strong Republican county, voting with the party since 1996. In the 1992 presidential election, Democratic nominee Bill Clinton won the county. In the 2016 presidential election, Republican nominee Donald Trump won the county with 63 percent of the vote, over Democratic nominee Hillary Clinton's 33 percent. Trump continued to increase his margin of victory in Pender in the 2020 and 2024 presidential elections.

United States presidential election results for Pender County, North Carolina
Year	Republican		Democratic		Third party(ies)	
Year	No.	%	No.	%	No.	%
1912	19	1.52%	967	77.11%	268	21.37%
1916	400	29.20%	970	70.80%	0	0.00%
1920	699	30.67%	1,580	69.33%	0	0.00%
1924	253	17.51%	1,175	81.31%	17	1.18%
1928	1,300	56.57%	998	43.43%	0	0.00%
1932	270	11.87%	1,993	87.64%	11	0.48%
1936	333	12.28%	2,379	87.72%	0	0.00%
1940	305	11.94%	2,249	88.06%	0	0.00%
1944	441	20.29%	1,732	79.71%	0	0.00%
1948	304	14.22%	1,334	62.39%	500	23.39%
1952	1,152	36.22%	2,029	63.78%	0	0.00%
1956	1,009	31.48%	2,196	68.52%	0	0.00%
1960	1,274	31.71%	2,744	68.29%	0	0.00%
1964	1,961	37.96%	3,205	62.04%	0	0.00%
1968	1,007	17.76%	1,942	34.26%	2,720	47.98%
1972	3,327	68.90%	1,415	29.30%	87	1.80%
1976	2,063	31.56%	4,422	67.65%	52	0.80%
1980	3,018	40.05%	4,382	58.15%	136	1.80%
1984	5,079	53.73%	4,354	46.06%	20	0.21%
1988	4,926	52.84%	4,377	46.95%	20	0.21%
1992	4,857	39.07%	5,825	46.86%	1,748	14.06%
1996	5,538	46.38%	5,409	45.30%	993	8.32%
2000	7,661	54.13%	6,415	45.32%	78	0.55%
2004	10,037	58.75%	6,999	40.97%	49	0.29%
2008	13,618	57.34%	9,907	41.72%	224	0.94%
2012	14,617	59.60%	9,632	39.27%	278	1.13%
2016	17,639	63.26%	9,354	33.54%	892	3.20%
2020	21,956	64.26%	11,723	34.31%	490	1.43%
2024	26,042	66.93%	12,460	32.02%	407	1.05%

== Education ==
The county is served by Pender County Schools.

== Communities ==
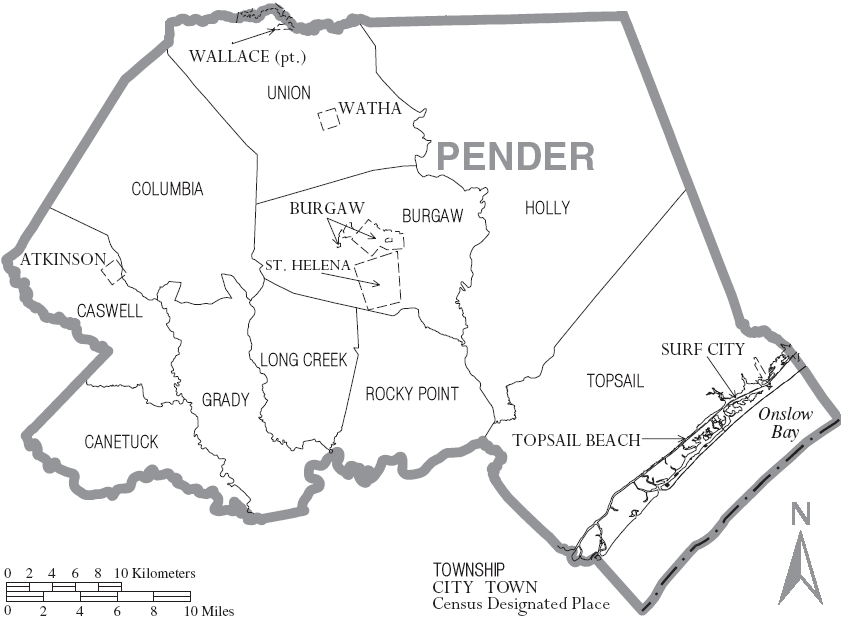
Map of Pender County with municipal and township labels

=== Towns ===
- Atkinson
- Burgaw (county seat)
- Surf City (also in Onslow County)
- Topsail Beach
- Wallace (also in Duplin County)
- Watha

=== Village ===
- St. Helena

=== Townships ===
- Burgaw
- Canetuck
- Caswell
- Columbia
- Grady
- Holly
- Long Creek
- Rocky Point
- Topsail
- Union

=== Census-designated places ===
- Hampstead (largest community)
- Long Creek
- Rocky Point

=== Other unincorporated communities ===
- Charity
- Currie
- Montague
- Register
- Scotts Hill
- Sloop Point
- Willard
- Yamacraw

== Notable people ==
- John Baptista Ashe, born in Rocky Point township, delegate to the Continental Congress
- John Baptista Ashe, born in Rocky Point township, nephew of the above, United States congressman from North Carolina
- William Shepperd Ashe, born in Rocky Point township, United States congressman from North Carolina

== See also ==
- List of counties in North Carolina
- National Register of Historic Places listings in Pender County, North Carolina
- North Carolina in the American Civil War
- Films and television shows produced in Wilmington, North Carolina

== Works cited ==
- Evans, William McKee (1995) [1966]. Ballots and Fence Rails: Reconstruction on the Lower Cape Fear (reprint ed.). Athens: University of Georgia Press. ISBN 0-8203-1731-4.
