= Burgaw, North Carolina =

- Town
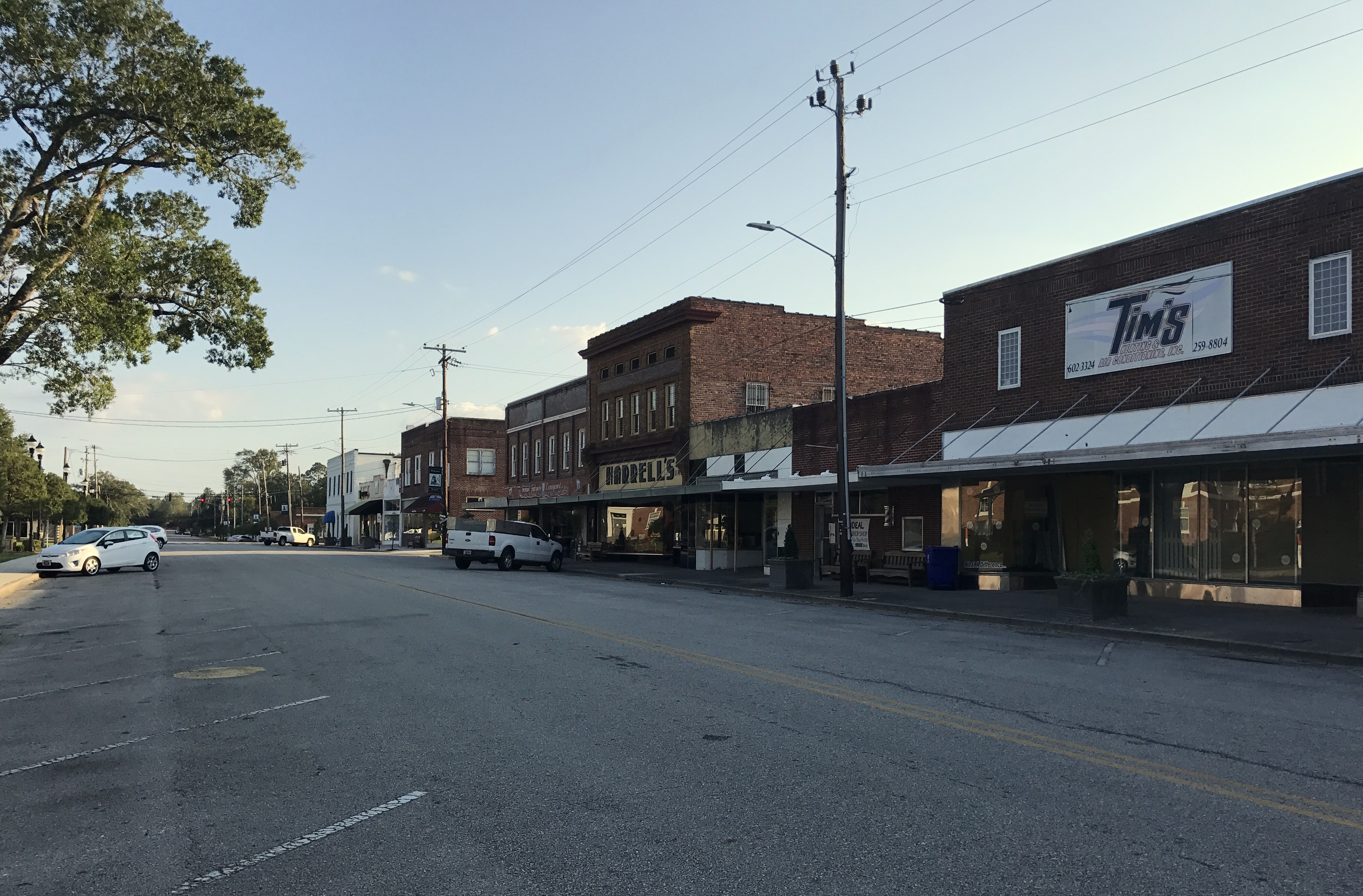
- South Wright Street

- Seal
- Motto: "Good Town Year Round"
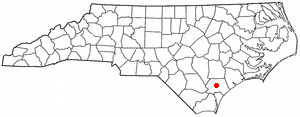
- Location of Burgaw, North Carolina
- Coordinates: 34°33′03″N 77°55′21″W
- Country: United States
- State: North Carolina
- County: Pender
- Settled: 1850
- Incorporated: 1879

Government
  - Mayor: Olivia Dawson

Area
  - Total: 4.75 sq mi (12.30 km^{2})
  - Land: 4.74 sq mi (12.27 km^{2})
  - Water: 0.012 sq mi (0.03 km^{2})
- Elevation: 43 ft (13 m)

Population (2020)
  - Total: 3,088
  - Density: 651.6/sq mi (251.58/km^{2})
- Time zone: UTC-5 (Eastern (EST))
  - Summer (DST): UTC-4 (EDT)
- ZIP code: 28425
- Area codes: 910, 472
- FIPS code: 37-08960
- GNIS feature ID: 2405345
- Website: burgawnc.gov

Burgaw is a town in and the county seat of Pender County, North Carolina, United States. Its population was 3,088 at the 2020 census.

Burgaw is part of the Wilmington, NC metropolitan statistical area.

== History ==
Before Burgaw was established, a small trading post called Cypress Grove was established along the Wilmington and Raleigh Railroad. In January of 1854, the post office department began to call this location, Burgaw Depot. After Pender County was separated from New Hanover County in February, 1875, a man named W.H. James, a civil engineer who was employed at the railroad examined land beside the railroad and Burgaw Creek, and reported it to be a good place for the town and well situated for drainage. On February 6, 1876 the Wilmington and Raleigh Railroad company deeded the plot of land to the Pender County Board of Commissioners to establish modern Burgaw and to the courthouse. The town of Burgaw was incorporated by an act of the North Carolina General Assembly (Private Laws, Chapter 23) on February 25, 1879, and on December 8, 1879, the name of the post office was changed from "Burgaw Depot" to just "Burgaw".

The town most likely derives its name from nearby Burgaw Creek.

The Bannerman House, Burgaw Depot, Burgaw Historic District, and Pender County Courthouse are listed on the National Register of Historic Places.

== Geography ==
According to the United States Census Bureau, the town has a total area of 3.5 square miles (9.1 km^{2}), of which 3.4 square miles (8.9 km^{2}) qre land and 0.29% is covered by water.

== Demographics ==
Historical population
Census	Pop.	Note	%±
1880	184		—
1890	366		98.9%
1900	387		5.7%
1910	956		147.0%
1920	1,040		8.8%
1930	1,209		16.3%
1940	1,476		22.1%
1950	1,613		9.3%
1960	1,750		8.5%
1970	1,744		−0.3%
1980	1,738		−0.3%
1990	1,807		4.0%
2000	3,337		84.7%
2010	3,872		16.0%
2020	3,088		−20.2%
U.S. Decennial Census

=== 2020 census ===
As of the 2020 census, Burgaw had a population of 3,088. The median age was 43.0 years; 21.0% of residents were under 18 and 24.4% were 65 or older. For every 100 females, there were 88.3 males, and for every 100 females 18 and over, there were 84.6 males.

None of the residents lived in urban areas, while 100.0% lived in rural areas.

Of the 1,233 households in Burgaw, including 682 families, 32.0% had children under 18 living in them, 38.9% were married-couple households, 17.2% were households with a male householder and no spouse or partner present, and 37.6% were households with a female householder and no spouse or partner present. About 32.8% of all households were made up of individuals, and 17.5% had someone living alone who was 65 or older.

The town had 1,418 housing units, of which 13.0% were vacant. The homeowner vacancy rate was 2.4% and the rental vacancy rate was 4.8%.

Burgaw racial composition
Race	Number	Percentage
White (non-Hispanic)	1,796	58.16%
Black or African American (non-Hispanic)	891	28.85%
Native American	11	0.36%
Asian	16	0.52%
Other/mixed	148	4.79%
Hispanic or Latino	226	7.32%

=== 2000 census ===
As of the 2000 census, 3,337 people, 954 households, and 649 families were residing in the town. The population density was 971.6 inhabitants per square mile (375.1/km^{2}). There were 1,051 housing units at an average density of 306.0 per square mile (118.1/km^{2}). The racial makeup of the town was 51.21% White, 44.89% African American, 0.69% Native American, 0.12% Asian, 2.10% from other races, and 0.99% from two or more races. Hispanics or Latinos of any race were 4.50% of the population.

Of the 954 households, 33.9% had children under 18 living with them, 42.7% were married couples living together, 22.2% had a female householder with no husband present, and 31.9% were not families. About 28.6% of all households were made up of individuals, and 13.2% had someone living alone who was 65 or older. The average household size was 2.39, and the average family size was 2.92.

In the town, the age distribution was 18.8% under 18, 9.2% from 18 to 24, 34.0% from 25 to 44, 19.9% from 45 to 64, and 18.1% who were 65 or older. The median age was 37 years. For every 100 females, there were 128.7 males. For every 100 females 18 and over, there were 137.4 males.

The median income in the town for a household was $28,819 and for a family was $36,813. Males had a median income of $29,750 versus $21,792 for females. The per capita income for the town was $13,831. About 13.0% of families and 19.3% of the population were below the poverty line, including 24.1% of those under 18 and 20.2% of those 65 or over.
