= Shipwreck (disambiguation) =

A shipwreck is the term for a sunken or derelict ship.

Shipwreck may also refer to:

== Arts and entertainment ==
- Shipwreck (book), a 1974 book with text by John Fowles and photographs by the Gibsons of Scilly
- Shipwreck (film), a 1931 animated film starring Oswald the Lucky Rabbit
- Shipwreck (1978 film) or The Sea Gypsies, an American film directed by Stewart Raffill
- Shipwreck (G.I. Joe), a fictional character in the G.I. Joe universe
- Shipwreck, a 1994 album by Chris Connelly
- Shipwreck, an episode of the anime anthology series Manga Fairy Tales of the World
- "Shipwreck!", an episode of the anime series The Little Prince
- "Shipwreck", a song by Your Memorial from the album Redirect
- Shipwreck (play), a 2019 play by Anne Washburn

=== Painting ===
- The Shipwreck (Vernet), a 1772 painting by Joseph Vernet
- The Shipwreck (Loutherbourg), a 1793 painting by Philip James de Loutherbourg
- The Shipwreck (Turner), an 1805 painting by J. M. W. Turner

== Other uses ==
- P-700 Granit, Soviet and Russian anti-ship missile with the NATO reporting name "Shipwreck"
- Alvin "Shipwreck" Kelly (1885 or 1893–1952), American pole sitter
- Shipwreck Kelly (American football) (1910–1986), American National Football League player, banker, and real estate investor
- Shipwreck Bay, New Zealand
- Shipwreck House, a home on Figure Eight Island

== See also ==
- Shipwrecked (disambiguation)
- Shipwrecking, an accident at sea when a ship sinks
- Ship breaking
