= Shipwrecked =

Shipwrecked is the past tense of shipwreck.

Shipwrecked may also refer to:

- Shipwrecked (TV series), a UK reality television show (2000–2012)
- Shipwrecked (1926 film), an American silent romantic adventure film
- Shipwrecked (1939 film), an Italian drama film
- Shipwrecked (1984 film), an Australian film
- Shipwrecked (1990 film), a family action-adventure film
- Shipwrecked (album), a 2004 album by Sultans
- Shipwrecked, a 1977 album by Gonzalez
- "Shipwrecked" (song), a 1997 song by Genesis
- "Shipwrecked", a song by the Gothic Archies
- "Shipwrecked" (I Shouldn't Be Alive episode), an episode from the Discovery Channel program I Shouldn't Be Alive
- The Shipwrecked, a 1994 Chilean film
- "Shipwrecked", the fourth downloadable content expansion of the video game Don't Starve
- "Shipwrecked", term used by Joseph Bruce in his lessons

== See also ==
- Shipwreck (disambiguation)
