= Chadsworth Cottage =

House on Figure Eight Island in North Carolina

Coordinates: 34.2925°N 77.7195°W

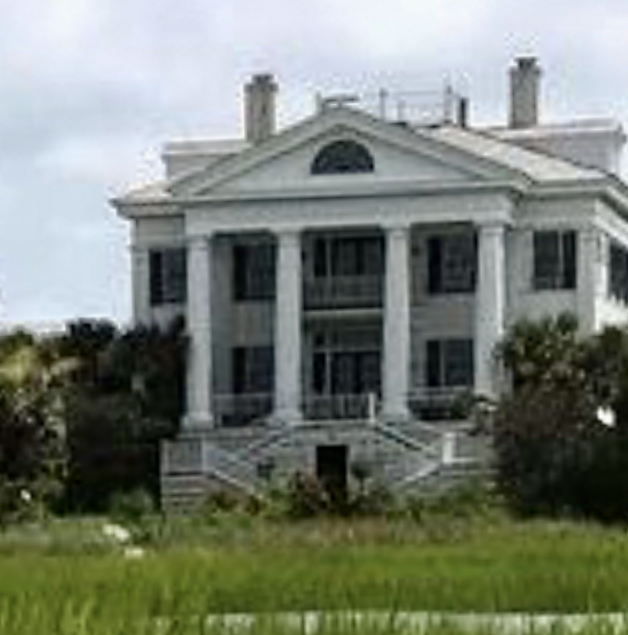
- Chadsworth Cottage in 2018

General information
- Status: private residence
- Type: beach house
- Architectural style: Neoclassical
- Location: 540 Beach Road North; Wilmington, North Carolina
- Completed: 2005
- Owner: Jeffrey L. Davis

Design and construction
- Architect(s): Christine G. H. Franck

Chadsworth Cottage is a mansion on Figure Eight Island, a private island near Wilmington, North Carolina.

== History ==
Chadsworth Cottage was built in 2005 as a private beach residence for Jeffrey L. Davis. The 4,800 square foot home was built on the north end of Figure Eight Island, overlooking Rich Inlet. Christine G. H. Franck designed the home in the Neoclassical style, combing elements of Palladian, Federal, and Greek Revival architecture, after being inspired by the architecture in the nearby towns of Wilmington, Bath, Edenton, and New Bern. The back of the house features large paladian columns. Chadsworth was featured as a show house in Period Homes magazine and opened to the public for tours to benefit St. John's Museum.
