= Litchfield Theatres =

Litchfield Theatres is an American entertainment company.

== History ==
The company began as a subsidiary of The Litchfield Company in the 1960s, and was founded by A. Foster McKissick in the Southeastern U.S.. The theatre chain, however, did not last very long before Mr. McKissick had to sell the company in the late 1960s. The theatre chain was born again in 1976 when it was again operating in the Southeastern United States as Litchfield Theatres. This time the company lasted until the late 1980s when Mr. McKissick was forced to sell not only the theatre chain, but also its parent company, The Litchfield Company. The theatre chain was sold to United Artists Theaters (which itself was sold to Regal Entertainment Group in 1999), and The Litchfield Company was sold to a real estate group in Pawley's Island South Carolina. The Litchfield Company has continued to exist, but the theatre chain has not been revived.

A. Foster McKissick died in a plane crash in 1990.

== Operating areas ==
- North Carolina
- South Carolina
- Virginia At least three in the Richmond area: Chester Cinemas 6, Midlothian Cinemas 6, and West Tower 6
- Florida At least one location in Tallahassee, one in Inverness, two in St. Augustine Florida - one of which was a discount theater with a restaurant, one in Lake Mary, one in Orlando, one in Gainesville, one in Jacksonville, and one at Cordova Mall in Pensacola.
- Georgia one in Valdosta, one on Macon, four locations in Savannah; two of them closed in 1998; one reopened under new ownership in 2007 - as part of a chain owned by Trademark Cinemas; it then was sold to Frank Theaters. It closed in early 2018. It reopened in 2020, after a remodel, and is now owned by the NGC Cinemas theater chain.
- Ohio Two locations in Southwest Ohio; One in Centerville and one in Middletown. Middletown location became a Danburry Location, and Centerville changed several times before closing.
