= Figure Eight Island =

Island of North Carolina

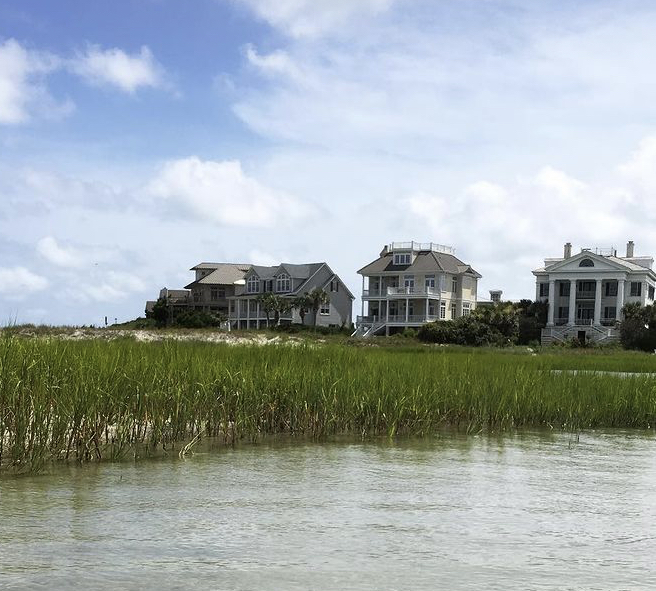

- Location within North Carolina Location within the United States

Geography
- Location: Harnett Township, New Hanover County, North Carolina
- Coordinates: 34°16′12″N 77°45′0″W
- Total islands: 1
- Area: 1,300 acres (530 ha).

Administration
- United States

Demographics
- Population: 441 households

Additional information
- Official website: www.figure8island.com

Figure Eight Island is a barrier island in the U.S. state of North Carolina, just north of Wrightsville Beach, widely known as an affluent summer colony and vacation destination. The island is part of the Wilmington Metropolitan Area, and lies between the Intracoastal Waterway and the Atlantic Ocean. As a private island, Figure Eight can only be reached by boat or via a guarded causeway swing bridge—the only private bridge over the Intracoastal Waterway in the American Southeast.

Nicknamed "The Hamptons of the South", the island has been a destination for celebrities and politicians—including former U.S. Vice President Al Gore and Senator John Edwards—and a summer residence for noted businessmen, including John J. Mack and William Johnston Armfield.

== History ==
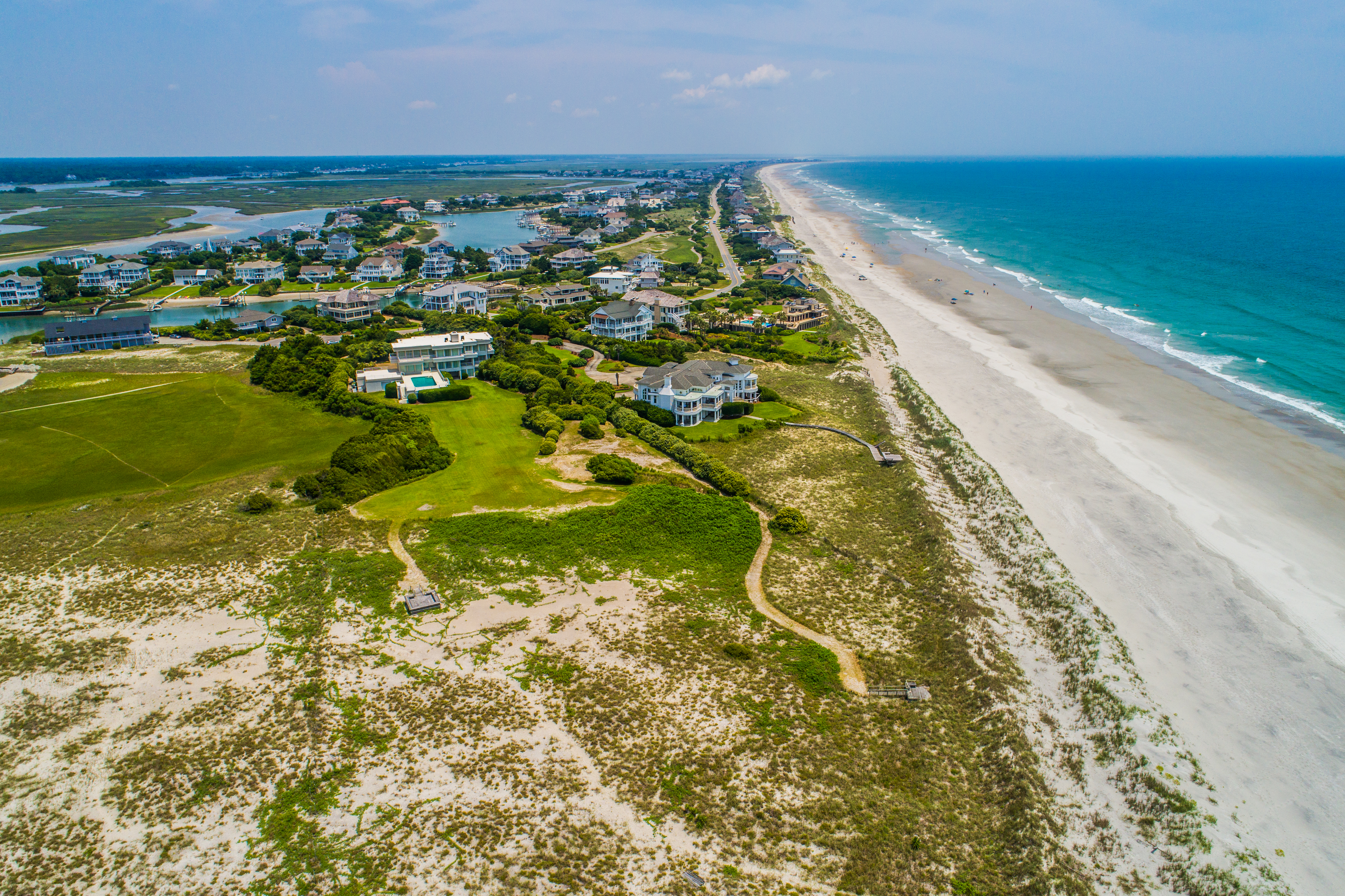
South end of Figure Eight Island

=== Pre-development ===
Figure Eight Island was first recorded as part of the Province of North Carolina in 1762, during the reign of George III, as a tract in a royal land grant to James Moore Jr., brother of Orton Plantation's Roger Moore. In 1775, the island passed from James Moore to American revolutionary Cornelius Harnett and became known as The Banks. In 1795, Harnett's property was purchased at an auction by James Foy, and the island became part of Poplar Grove Plantation. It was renamed Foy Island and also popularly called Woods Beach. Foy Island remained a part of the Plantation for the next 160 years.

During the American Civil War, on September 21, 1863, a Confederate States Navy screw steamer called Phantom, which was acting as a blockade runner, was chased into the shallows along the island by the USS Connecticut. The ship was carrying rifle muskets, cannons, other arms, lead, whiskey, and gin. The crew set fire to Phantom and abandoned ship. Confederate sharpshooters shot and killed a U.S. Navy landsman who approached Phantom in an attempt to put out the fire. Following the shooting, USS Connecticut destroyed the ship in the New Topsail Inlet, just north of the island. Another Confederate blockade runner, the Anglo-Confederate Trading Company steamer Wild Dayrell, wrecked in Rich Inlet, on the north side of the island, on February 1, 1864. The shipwrecks are part of the Cape Fear Civil War Shipwreck Discontiguous District.

On April 17, 1877 a lumber schooner from Norfolk, Virginia, the John S. Lee, wrecked at sea near the island after setting sail from the Cape Fear River in Wilmington towards Venezuela. A storm had caused the ship to break in half and wash up on the beach at Rich's Inlet. All crew from the John S. Lee died at sea. In 2015, the ship was rediscovered during the construction of Shipwreck House on the island.

During Prohibition in the 1930s, an illegal whiskey still was operated by Rod Rogers, a local fisherman, on the north end of the island. The remains of another still were found nearby.

During World War II, the United States Coast Guard maintained a structure and small water tower on the island, which itself was patrolled via horseback. Coast Guard Auxiliary craft monitored the surrounding inlets. Republic P-47 Thunderbolt and Bell P-39 Airacobra aircraft based at Bluenthenthal Field used the island for strafing practice.

=== Early development ===
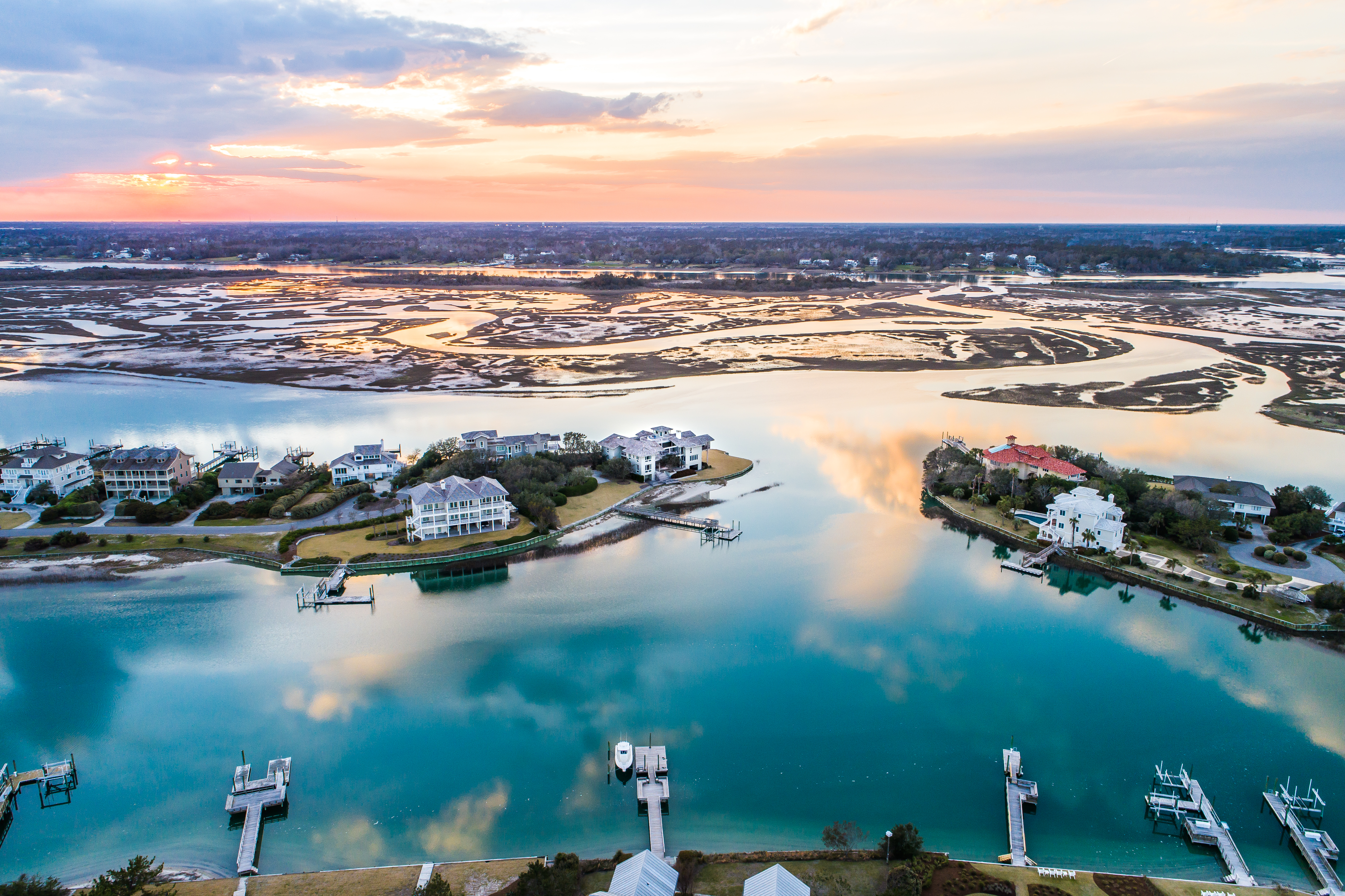
Drone photography of Figure Eight Island facing western NC

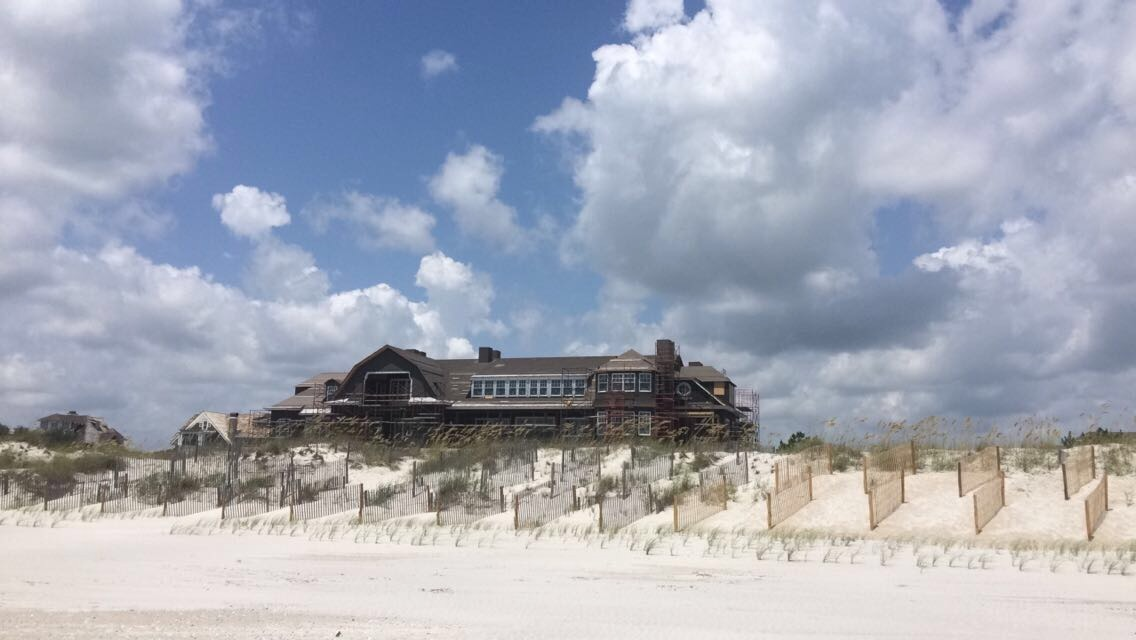
A house under construction in 2016

In 1954 Hurricane Hazel hit the East Coast and destroyed much of the development from Myrtle Beach up to Topsail Beach, with more than 15,000 homes and structures destroyed and another 39,000 homes damaged. Beach properties were no longer in as high demand, and many landowners wanted to sell their properties. During this time, the Mayor of Wilmington, Dan Cameron, and his brother Bruce Cameron began acquiring the island from George Hutaff and the Foy family. The Camerons paid the Foys $50,000 for their portion of the land and then purchased two areas of adjoining marshland for $25,000 apiece in 1955. For the next 10 years, the property lay dormant. The Cameron brothers joined their cousin, Raeford Trask, and investor Richard Wetherill, forming the Island Development Company to develop the real estate on the island. They named the island Figure Eight to indicate Rich's Inlet Creek's crooked paths in the marsh. At this time, the only way to access the island was by boat, so the Island Development Company approached Champion Davis, owner of the marshland off Porters Neck, on acquiring more land to build a bridge to the island from the mainland. Davis turned down an offer to partner with the company. The Island Development Company eventually purchased two small tracts. A small parcel of land from the members of Edgewater Club to build a roadway bridge that now leads to Figure Eight Island's bridge. The first bridge was built on top of a government surplus landing ship tank.

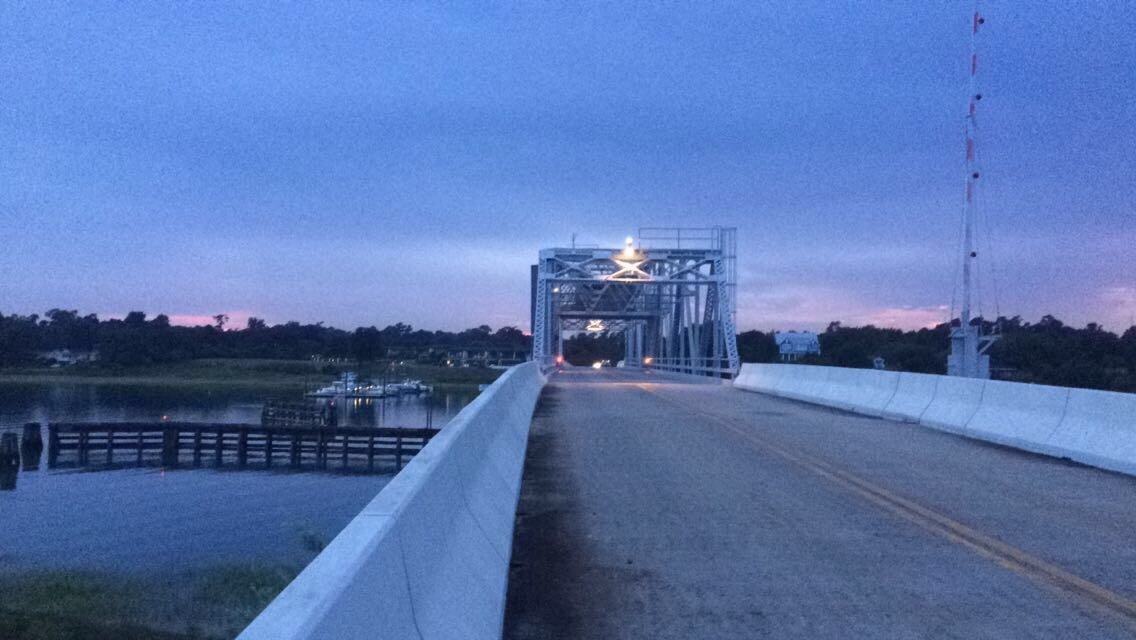
Figure Eight Island's guarded causeway swing bridge over the Intracoastal Waterway

The Camerons hired Richard Bell Associates to design Figure Eight's development concept. John Oxenfeld and Haywood Newkirk, Sr. were brought on to design the early houses. The first lots sold for as little as $5,000, and the first house was constructed in 1963. On March 30, 1971, the Camerons sold Figure Eight Island to Young M. Smith, Jr., an attorney and developer from Hickory, North Carolina, for $4 million. Smith's company, The Litchfield Company, was already in the process of building a luxury condominium complex near Pawleys Island, South Carolina. When the change of ownership over Figure Eight took place, thirty houses and one hundred and twelve lots were sold. Smith brought architects Ligon Flynn and Henry Johnston in on the development project and landscape architect Dick Bell. Smith's wife was the grand-niece of the late Julian Price, a wealthy insurance executive of Jefferson Standard Life Insurance Company in Greensboro. Price's son, Ralph Clay Price, who inherited the business, left his niece and brothers as heirs to the Price estate. Much of their fortune was invested in the development of Figure Eight Island. The local marina club opened on August 11, 1973.

While Figure Eight enjoyed early success in the home and lot sales in the early 1970s, the recession hit The Litchfield Company hard. Its subsidiary, Figure Eight Development Company, went into bankruptcy in 1974. The marina club closed down. After two open auctions were held at the New Hanover County Courthouse in 1975, Continental Illinois National Bank and Trust Company emerged as the island's new mortgage holder. The marina club reopened in 1976 and adopted the title of Figure Eight Yacht Club in the spring of 1977. In 1980, a modern bridge from Port Royal, Virginia was bought to replace the old bridge connecting the island to the mainland for $1.5 million.

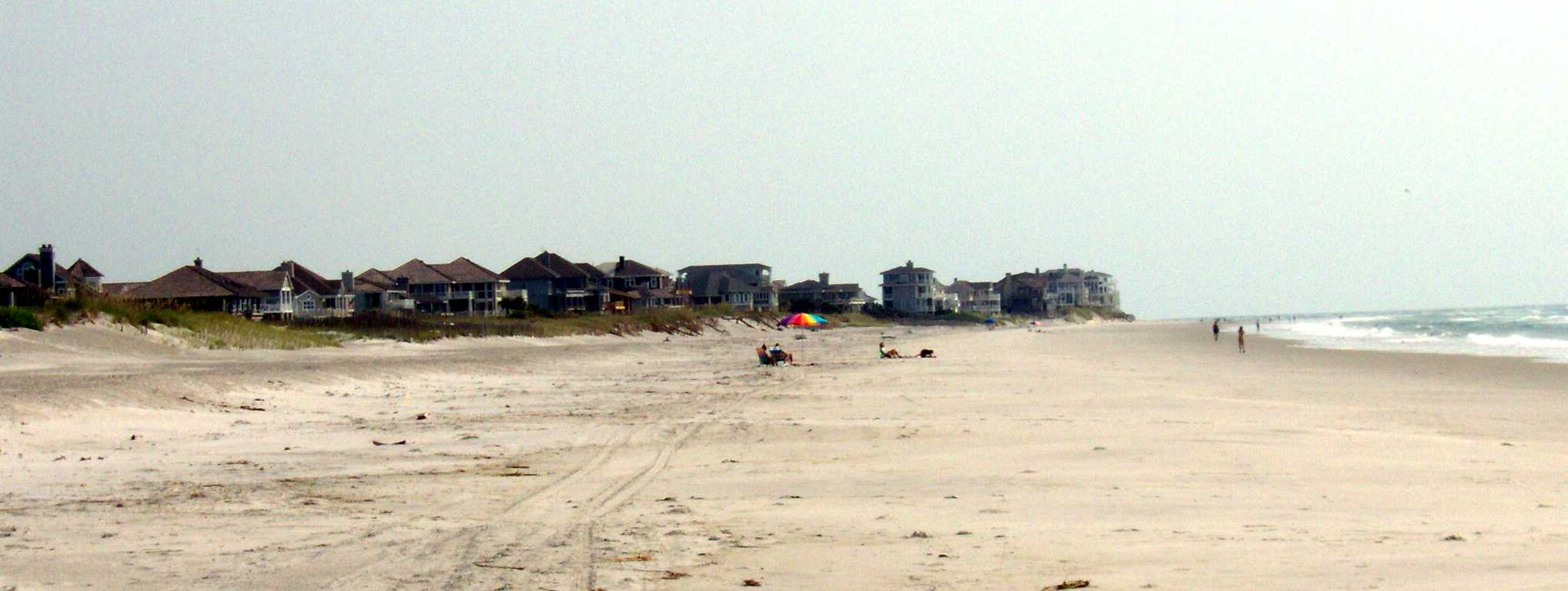
houses along the shoreline

=== Recent history ===
The Figure Eight Homeowners Association now owns the island. The first full-time administrator of the Association was hired in 1982, and after several short-term managers, Arthur Poineau served as administrator for 20 years. David Kellam, the son of earlier residents on the island, has held the position since 2001. There are approximately 475 houses developed on Figure Eight. Figure Eight's boathouse was one of the first structures constructed on the island in the 1960s.

In August 1974, a federal grand jury indicted fifteen people connected to smuggling 14,000 pounds of marijuana from Colombia at Figure Eight. The smuggling ring was operated by an attorney who had rented two houses on the island. The drugs were smuggled into the island's yacht marina by the use of a sports fishing boat.

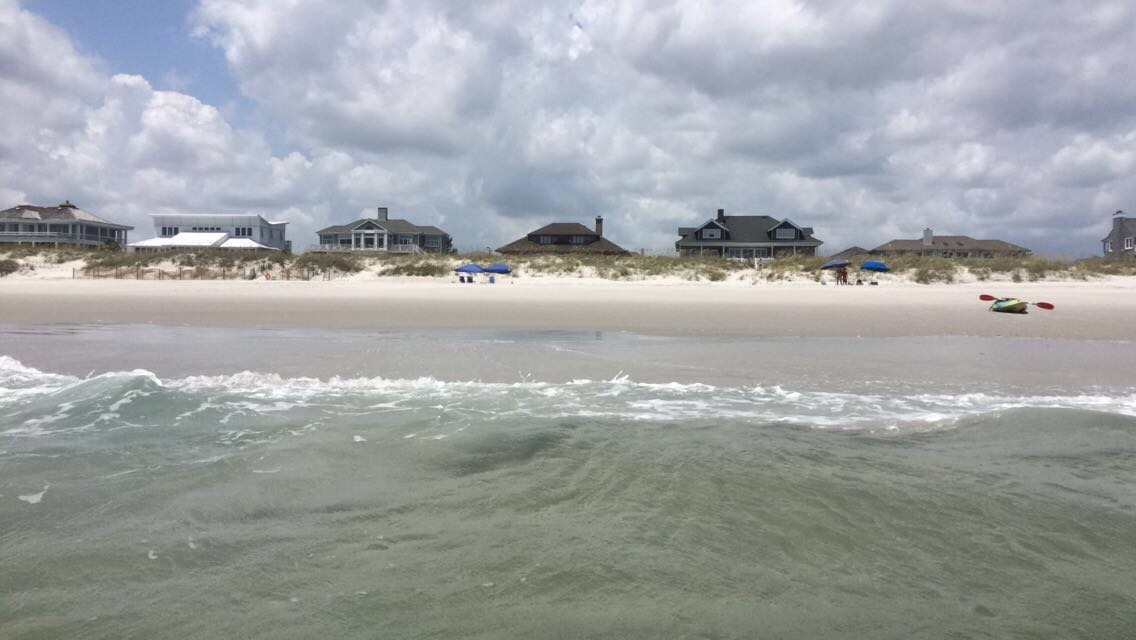
Waterfront homes at Figure Eight

Since Dino De Laurentiis opened his studio in Wilmington in 1983, Figure Eight has been a popular temporary residence for Hollywood actors working on films in Wilmington. Alec Baldwin, Kim Basinger, Kathy Bates, Robert Downey Jr., Susan Downey, Andy Griffith, Richard Gere, Barbra Streisand, and Paul Newman have all been guests on the island. Due to it being a popular vacation destination for wealthy North Carolinians, celebrities, and politicians, the island has been referred to as "The Hamptons of the South." The island has tennis courts, a boat ramp, a yacht club, and a marina. The Eagle Point Golf Club, located on the mainland, has connections to Figure Eight, built by several Island residents. The Figure Eight Yacht Club is a private island club for dining and formal events. Figure Eight is not accessible to the public by car but is by boat. The majority of the residents of Figure Eight are seasonal. An estimated 90 percent of the houses on Figure Eight Islands are second homes, and fewer than one hundred houses are on the rental market. Houses on Figure Eight average above $2 million in property value.

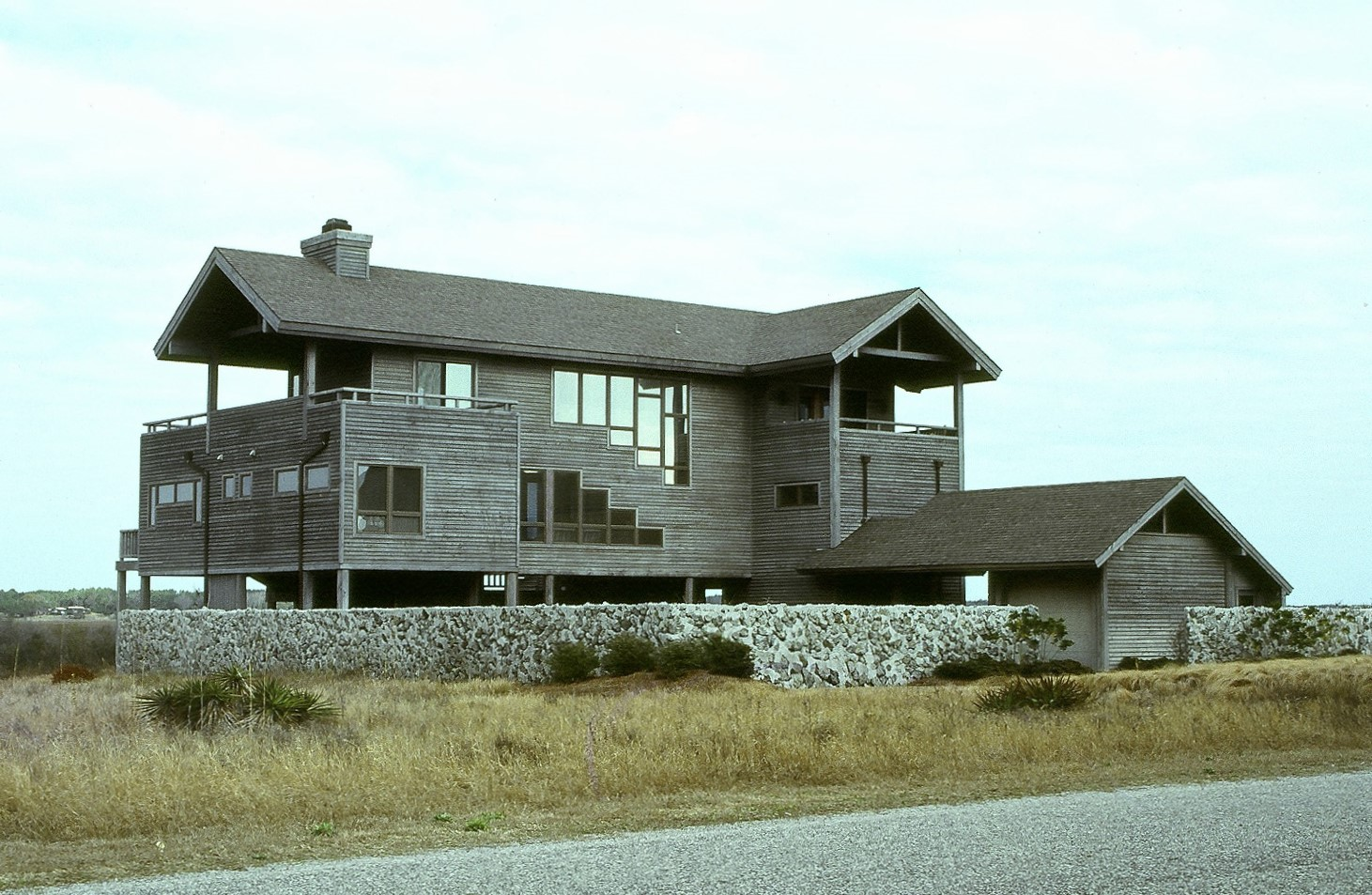
a house on Figure Eight designed by Ligon Flynn

On March 14, 2018 a $2 million house on the island was destroyed by a fire while undergoing renovations. No one was injured in the incident.

In October 2020, a house sold on the island for $5.5 million, becoming the highest sale ever recorded in the North Carolina Regional Multiple Listing Service. In July 2024, The Whale, a 6,700-square-foot oceanfront home on Figure Eight Island, sold for $13.9 million, becoming the highest home sale price in North Carolina. The previous record was the August 2023 sale of a $13 million oceanfront home on Figure Eight Island.

==== Hurricanes and other storms ====
In September 1996, Hurricane Fran damaged the island properties. All utilities and telephone lines were knocked out, septic tanks overflowed, the roads were blocked by debris and standing water, all docks were washed out, and one house was destroyed. It took one week to pump floodwater out of low-lying areas. The yacht club building was closed for seven months for repairs.

In September 2018, Hurricane Florence hit the North Carolina coast, damaging some of the properties on the island.

On August 8, 2019 a funnel cloud formed off of the north tip of Figure Eight.

In September 2019 the island was evacuated prior to Hurricane Dorian making landfall. Hurricane Dorian caused a waterspout to move ashore onto the north end of Figure Eight Island, causing damage to some beachfront houses.

== Geography ==
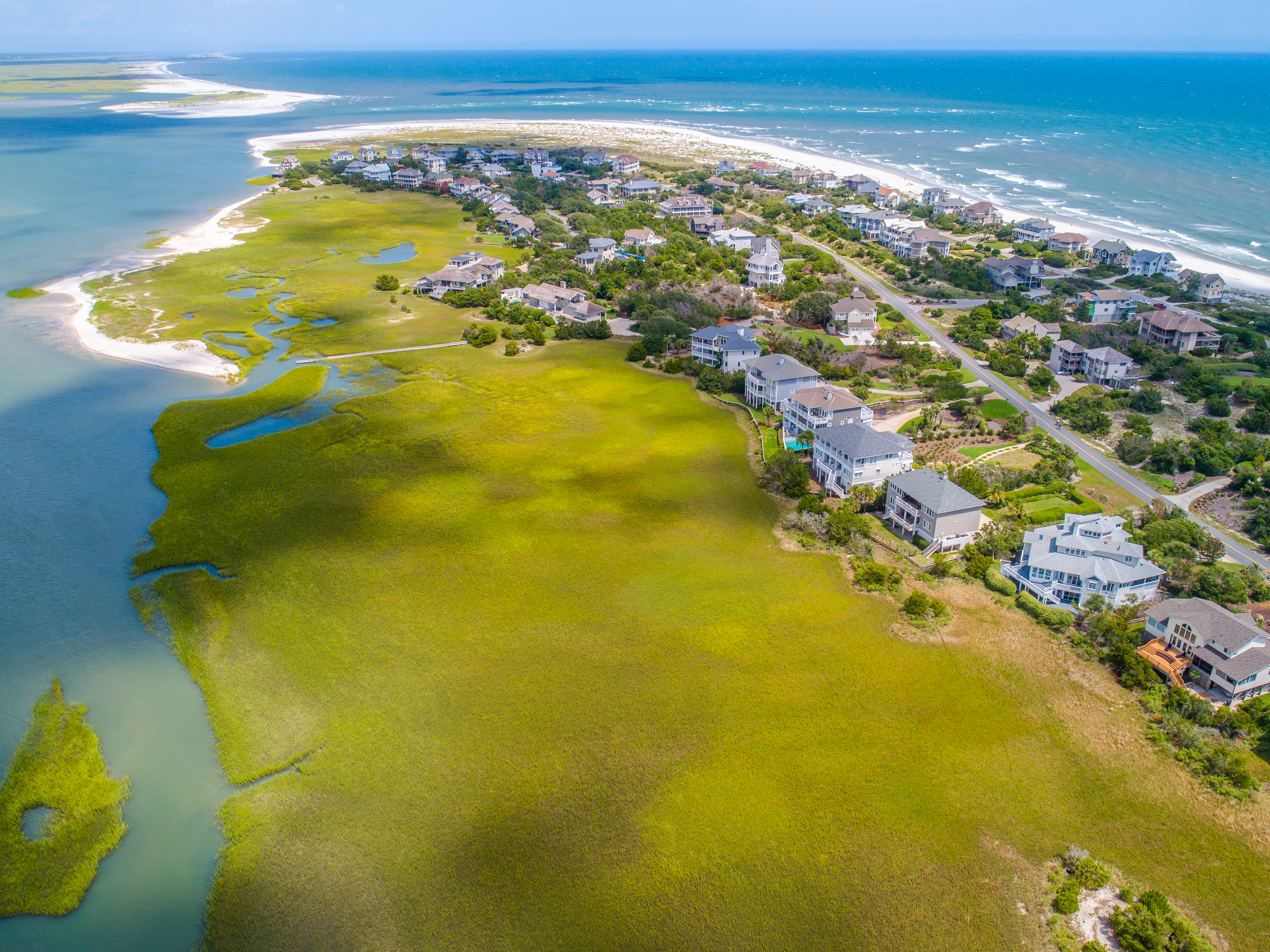
Birds-eye view of Figure Eight Island

Figure Eight Island is located just north of Wrightsville Beach and Wilmington. The island has an area of 1,300 acres (526 ha), most of which is marshland.

Between the northernmost part of Figure Eight and Lea-Hutaff Island lies Rich Inlet, one of the few natural inlets in North Carolina. To the south, between the island and Wrightsville Beach, lies Mason Inlet. The former is a stable inlet, while the latter is migratory.

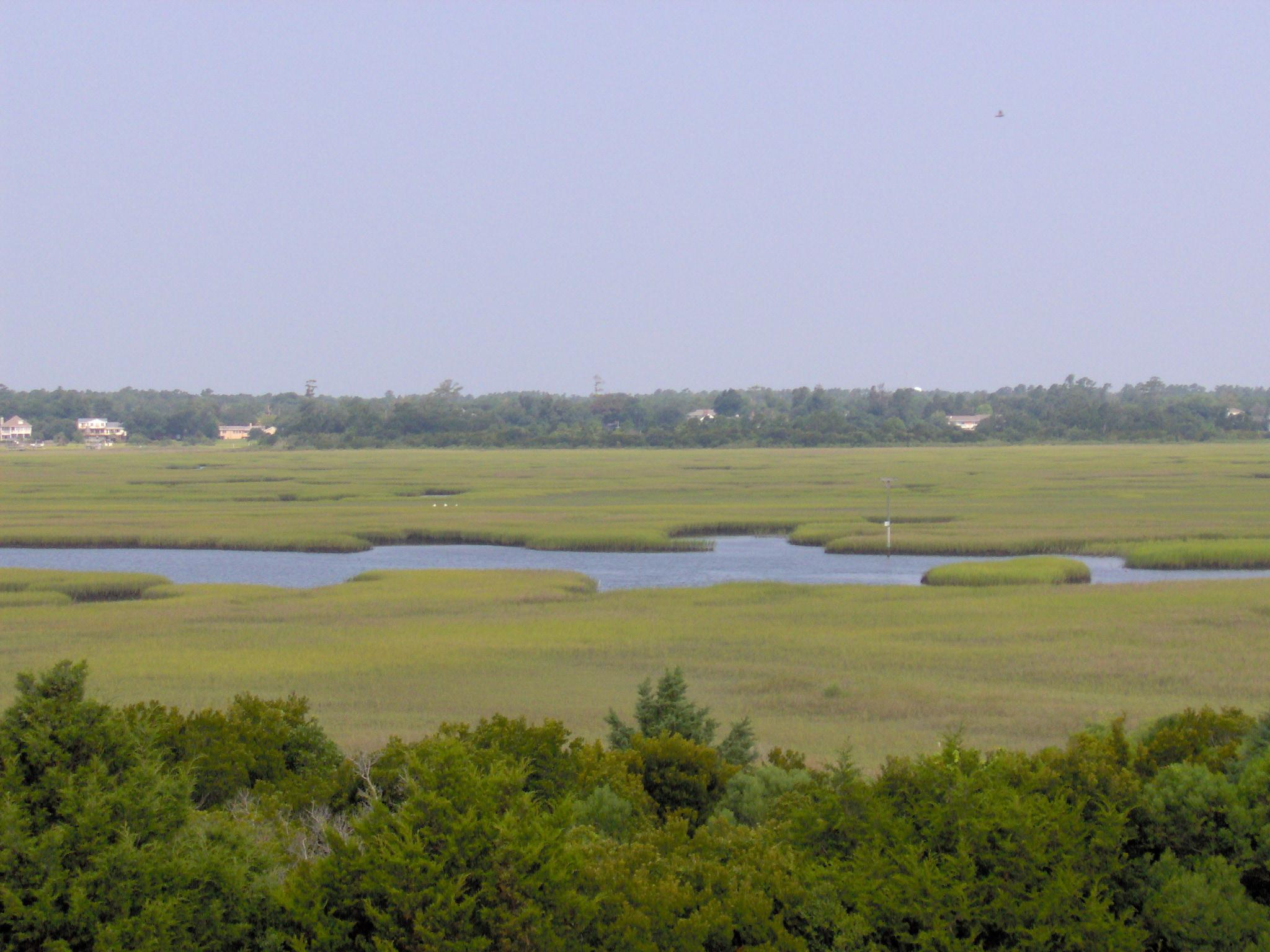
Image of Figure Eight's marshland from the beach side of the island

=== Ocean ===
Due to the island's proximity to the warm waters of the Gulf Stream, the ocean temperatures off of Figure Eight are comparable to destinations much further south and considerably warmer than the ocean off the Outer Banks.

| Location | JAN | FEB | MAR | APR 1-15 | APR 16-30 | MAY 1-15 | MAY 16-31 | JUN 1-15 | JUN 16-30 | JUL 1-15 | JUL 16-31 | AUG 1-15 | AUG 16-31 | SEP 1-15 | SEP 16-30 | OCT 1-15 | OCT 16-31 | NOV | DEC |
|---|---|---|---|---|---|---|---|---|---|---|---|---|---|---|---|---|---|---|---|
| Duck, NC | 45 | 44 | 46 | 58 | 60 | 66 | 68 | 73 | 74 | 71 | 71 | 73 | 75 | 76 | 74 | 71 | 66 | 59 | 52 |
| Wilmington, NC | 58 | 58 | 62 | 69 | 72 | 75 | 78 | 80 | 81 | 82 | 83 | 82 | 83 | 83 | 82 | 79 | 75 | 69 | 62 |
| Daytona Beach, FL | 61 | 59 | 65 | 70 | 73 | 75 | 78 | 79 | 80 | 80 | 80 | 80 | 81 | 83 | 82 | 79 | 76 | 71 | 65 |

Figure Eight Island has never been subject to water quality advisories, which have been issued for nearby beaches.

== Wildlife ==
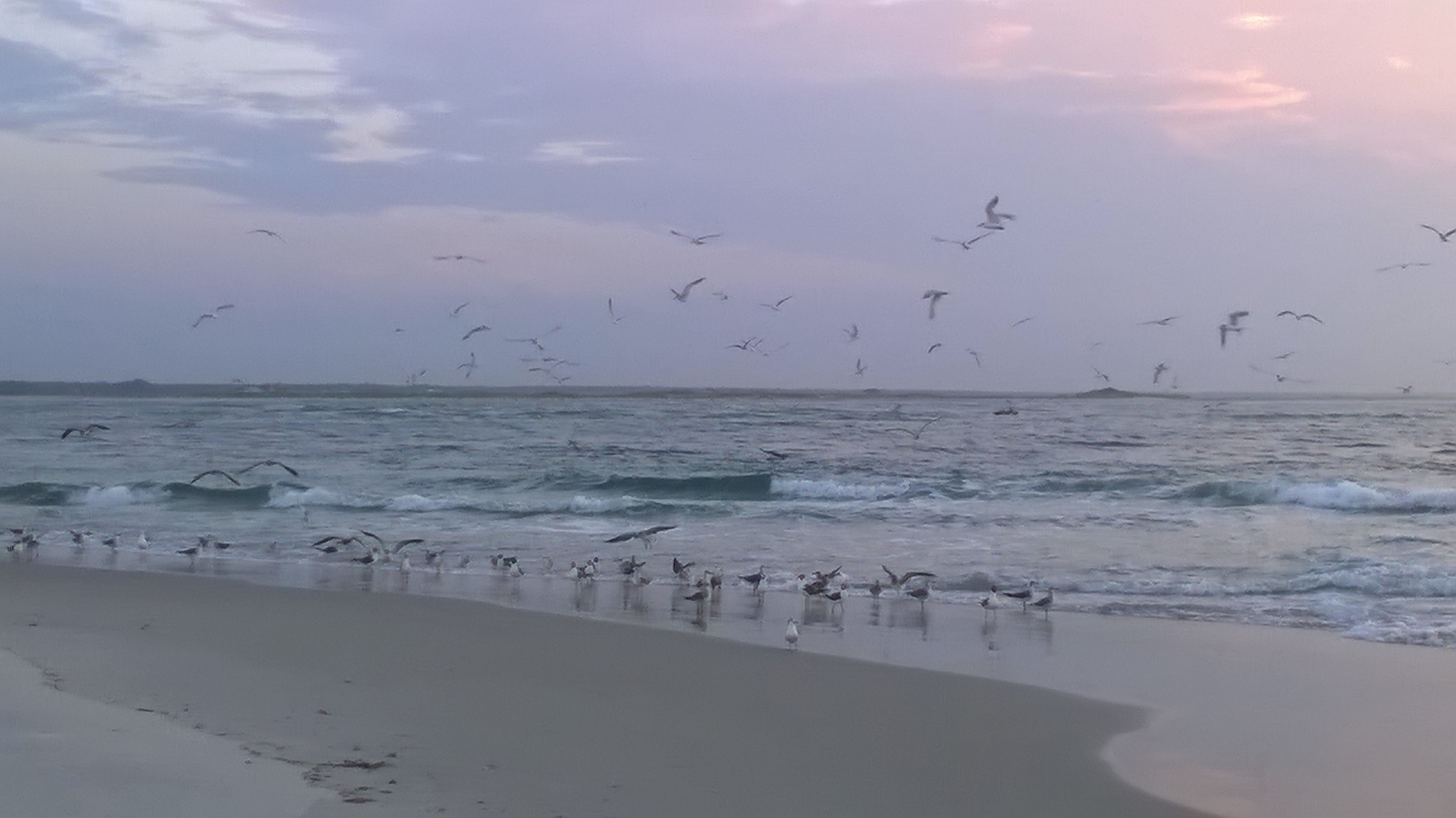
Gulls fishing in Rich Inlet, along the Figure Eight shore

The local chapter of the National Audubon Society has recorded 104 different species of birds on Figure Eight. Most live in Rich Inlet, generally considered the southernmost nesting area for the critically endangered Great Lakes piping plover. In 2015, approximately 800 Least Tern nested on the northern section of the island, making it the largest Least Tern colony in the state and one of the largest on the Eastern seaboard. Other birds that nested there include American Oystercatchers, Common Terns, Black Skimmers, Piping Plovers, Wilson's Plovers and Willets. Savannah Sparrows, Atlantic Plovers, Greater Yellowlegs, and pelicans have been found in Mason Inlet to the south.

The Shark Research Institute has recorded two non-fatal shark attacks on surfers at Figure Eight; the first on 8 August 2010 and the second on 27 August 2014.

On June 2, 2023, the bodies of a mother pygmy sperm whale and her calf washed up on the island. In June 2025, the rib and jaw bones from a baleen whale that had been cut by humans were reported on the island. The National Oceanic and Atmospheric Administration opened an investigation to determine what happened to the baleen whale.

=== Conservation ===
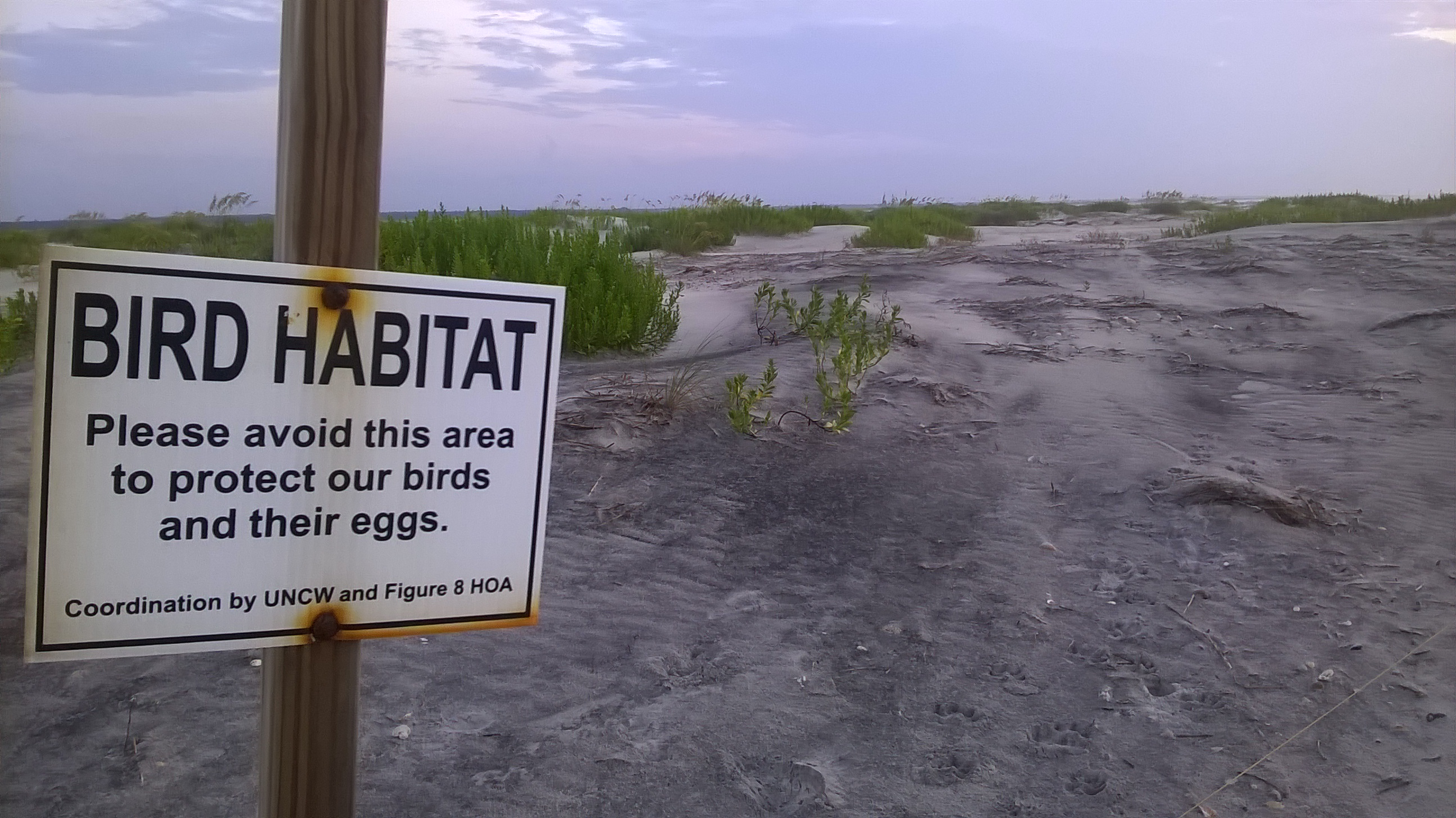
Protected bird habitat on the northern side of Figure East, along Rich Inlet

Sea turtles have been monitored and protected on the island since 1986 and monitored daily. Sea turtle nests are cordoned off for protection. In 2016, there were 8 nests on the island. In 2001 and 2002, the homeowners association commissioned a survey of endangered plants and animals on the island, including piping plovers, sea turtles, sea beach amaranth, and marine mammals. The University of North Carolina at Wilmington surveyed the island's bird populations as part of the $50,000 "Mason Inlet Relocation Project" commissioned by New Hanover County.

==== Terminal groin controversy ====
In early 2016, the Figure Eight Island Homeowners Association's Board of Directors pursued the construction of a terminal groin by the United States Army Corps of Engineers on the northern section of the island to stabilize Rich Inlet and prevent erosion. Various environmental groups, including the North Carolina Coastal Federation, the Southern Environmental Law Center, and the National Audubon Society, criticized the proposal, deeming it largely unnecessary and potentially harmful to local bird and fish populations. On November 17, 2016, the Figure 8 Island Homeowners Association announced that the proposal to pursue a Terminal Groin did not pass and would not proceed.

== Notable buildings ==
- Chadsworth Cottage, private residence built in 2005
- Shipwreck House, private residence built in 2015
- The Whale, private residence built in 2019

== Fictional portrayal ==
In June 2001, author Wanda Canada published a murder mystery novel titled Island Murders, which takes place on Figure Eight Island.

Figure Eight is referenced in the 2020 Netflix original television series Outer Banks as an affluent neighborhood where the "Kooks" live.

== Bibliography ==
- Gaines, W. Craig, Encyclopedia of Civil War Shipwrecks, Louisiana State University Press, 2008, ISBN 978-0-8071-3274-6.

| Preceded by Lea-Hutaff Island | Beaches of Southeastern North Carolina | Succeeded by Wrightsville Beach |
