= The Whale (Figure Eight Island) =

House on Figure Eight Island in North Carolina

Coordinates: 34°15′25″N 77°45′20″W

General information
- Status: private residence
- Type: beach house
- Location: 102 Beach Road South; Wilmington, North Carolina
- Completed: 2019

Design and construction
- Architect(s): John Stirewalt

The Whale is a mansion on Figure Eight Island, near Wilmington, North Carolina. In 2024, the home sold for $13.9 million, making it the most expensive residential real estate transaction in North Carolina.

== History ==
The Whale was designed by John Stirewalt and built by J. Long Custom Homes in 2019. It was the last house to be designed by Stirewalt before his death. The house is a 6,700-square-foot oceanfront home with five bedrooms and eight bathrooms. The exterior of the house was made of white cedar imported from Canada. It is located on Beach South Road.

In 2024, The Whale sold by Chris and Crystal Dunbar for $13.9 million, making it the most expensive residential real estate transaction in North Carolina's history.
