= Lea-Hutaff Island =

Island in North Carolina, United States

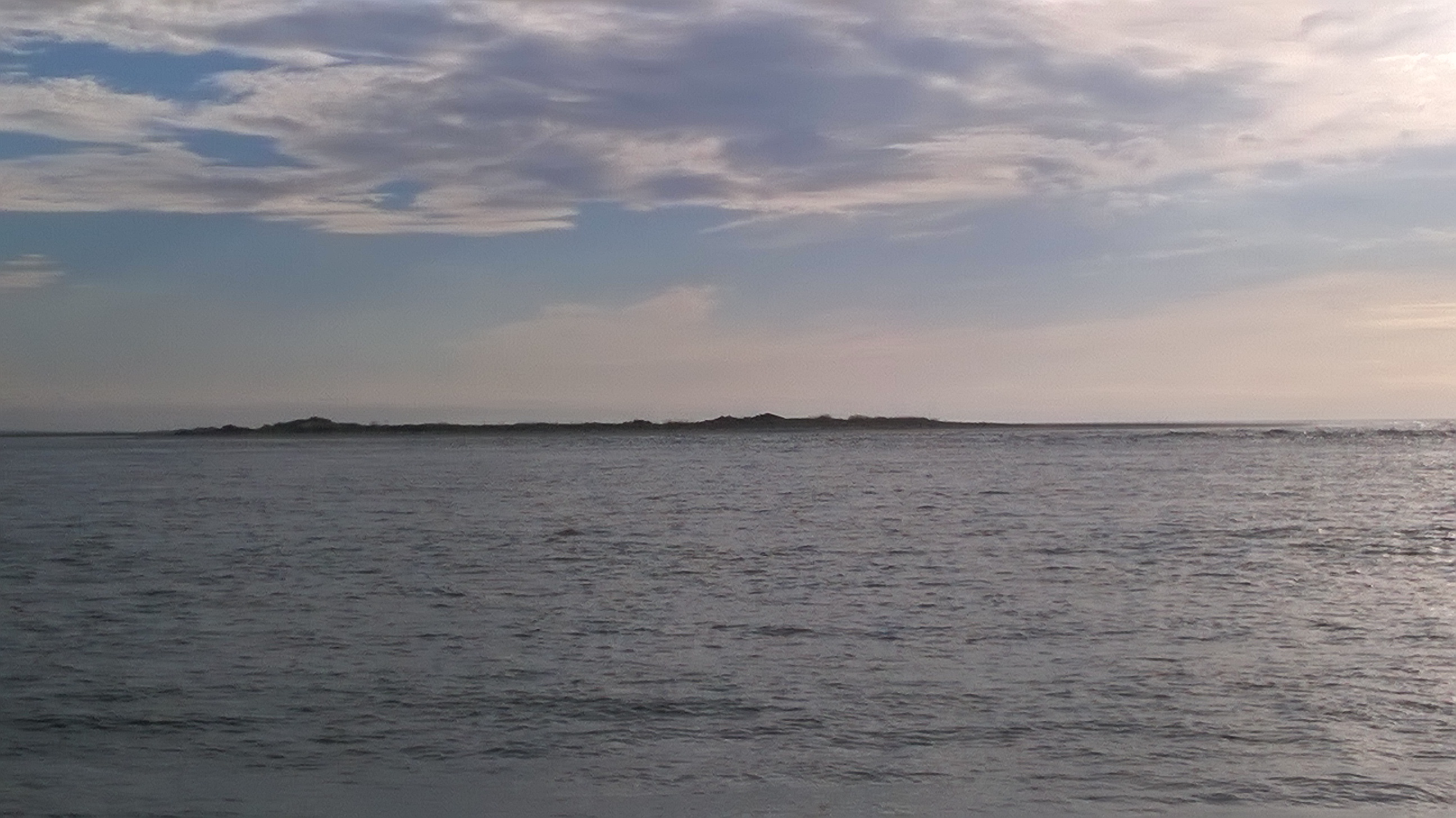
- View of Lea-Hutaff Island, North Carolina from Figure Eight Island

- Location within North Carolina

Geography
- Location: Pender County, North Carolina
- Coordinates: 34°16′12″N 77°45′0″W
- Total islands: 1
- Area: 5,641 acres (2,283 ha)

Administration
- United States

Demographics
- Population: 0

Lea-Hutaff Island (formerly Lea Island and Hutaff Island) is a 5,641-acre (22.83 km^{2}) uninhabited barrier island and marsh system located off the coast of North Carolina. Lea Island State Natural Area is a 25-acre (0.10 km^{2}) North Carolina State Park on the northern end of the island.

The island is separated from Topsail Island to the north by New Topsail Inlet and Figure Eight Island to the South by Rich Inlet and from the mainland by Topsail Sound. The four mile long landmass was consolidated in 1998 when Old Topsail Inlet (also known as Elmore's Inlet) that had separated Lea Island and Hutaff Island (also known as Elmore's Island) closed.

== History ==
Lea Island got its name from Joseph Hampton Lea Sr., the owner of a prominent Hampstead seafood business who purchased the land from the North Carolina State Board of Education in the early 1950s. Hutaff Island's name came from George Hutaff, who bought the property in 1925.

Lea Island was subdivided into approximately 40 lots that were offered for sale in the 1980s. Three houses were constructed on the island, but they were soon threatened by erosion due to the relentless southward migration of New Topsail inlet. The inlet has migrated more than six miles since it opened prior to 1730 and as of 2014 was still migrating southward at a rate of approximately 50 feet per year. Due to the rapid erosion and the challenges of living off-the-grid on a remote barrier island without public utilities, and no bridge or ferry service to the mainland, many landowners who had initially bought lots and planned to build homes on Lea Island abandoned the idea. By the early 2000s efforts were underway to prevent future development on Lea Island. In partnership with Audubon North Carolina, the North Carolina Coastal Land Trust started buying the remaining privately owned lots to transfer to the state. The land trust made deals with most of the owners who were willing to sell; other owners donated their lots. The acquired land was transferred to the State of North Carolina and became Lea Island State Natural Area. Audubon bought 36 acres on Lea Island in 2010.

The last of the homes on Lea-Hutaff Island was destroyed by a storm in October 2015. The northern portion of Lea-Hutaff Island that was Lea Island is now mostly held by the National Audubon Society and the state government. The North Carolina Coastal Land Trust purchased Hutaff Island in July 2021. The island is only accessible by boat. The island is also a prominent nesting spot for loggerhead turtles, Least Terns, American Oystercatchers, Piping Plovers and Clapper Rails.

In 2025, the University of North Carolina at Wilmington's Marine Mammal Stranding Network received a call regarding the remains of a dismembered male bottlenose dolphin on the island. The dolphin had been completely decapitated and the apaxial muscle had been removed from its back. Tiffany Keenan, director of the network, conducted a necropsy and determined that the dolphin likely drowned in ship netting, based on markings found on the body and the hyper-inflation of the animal's lungs, and was later dumped in a creek on the island to be harvested for meat. Evidence of brucellosis, a harmful bacterial disease that can be transmitted to humans, was found in the dolphin's tissues. The National Marine Fisheries Service opened an investigation into the dolphin's death and dismemberment.

Preceded by Topsail Beach	Beaches of Southeastern North Carolina	Succeeded by Figure Eight Island
