= Ligon Flynn =

American architect

Ligon Broadus Flynn
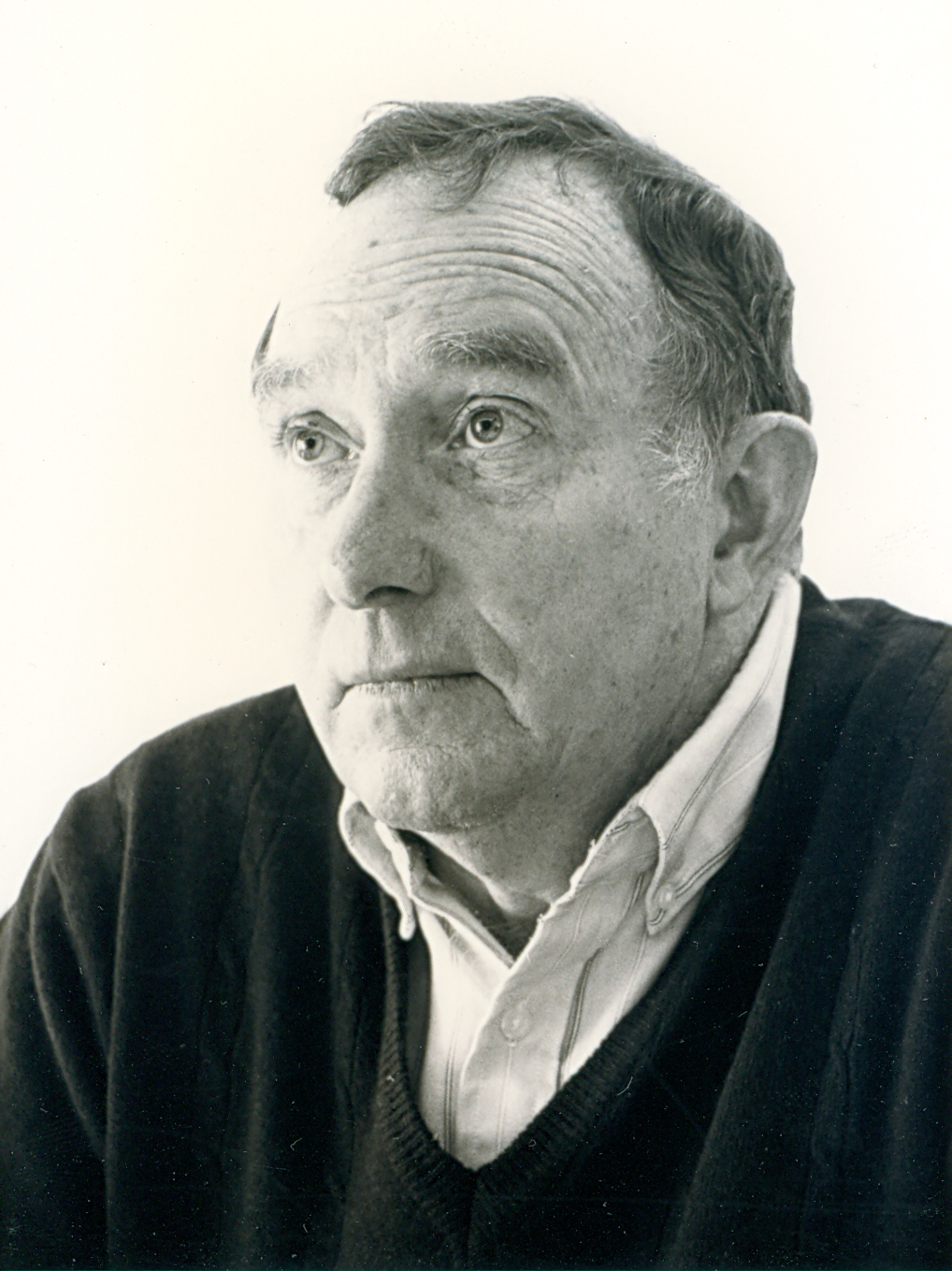
- Flynn in 1987
- Born: February 24, 1931; Tryon, North Carolina (near)
- Died: September 26, 2010 (aged 78)
- Education: North Carolina State University
- Occupation: Architect
- Spouse(s): Susan Flynn, née Hardin
- Children: son: Ligon Haywood Flynn, daughter: Susan Brooks Flynn Romano James

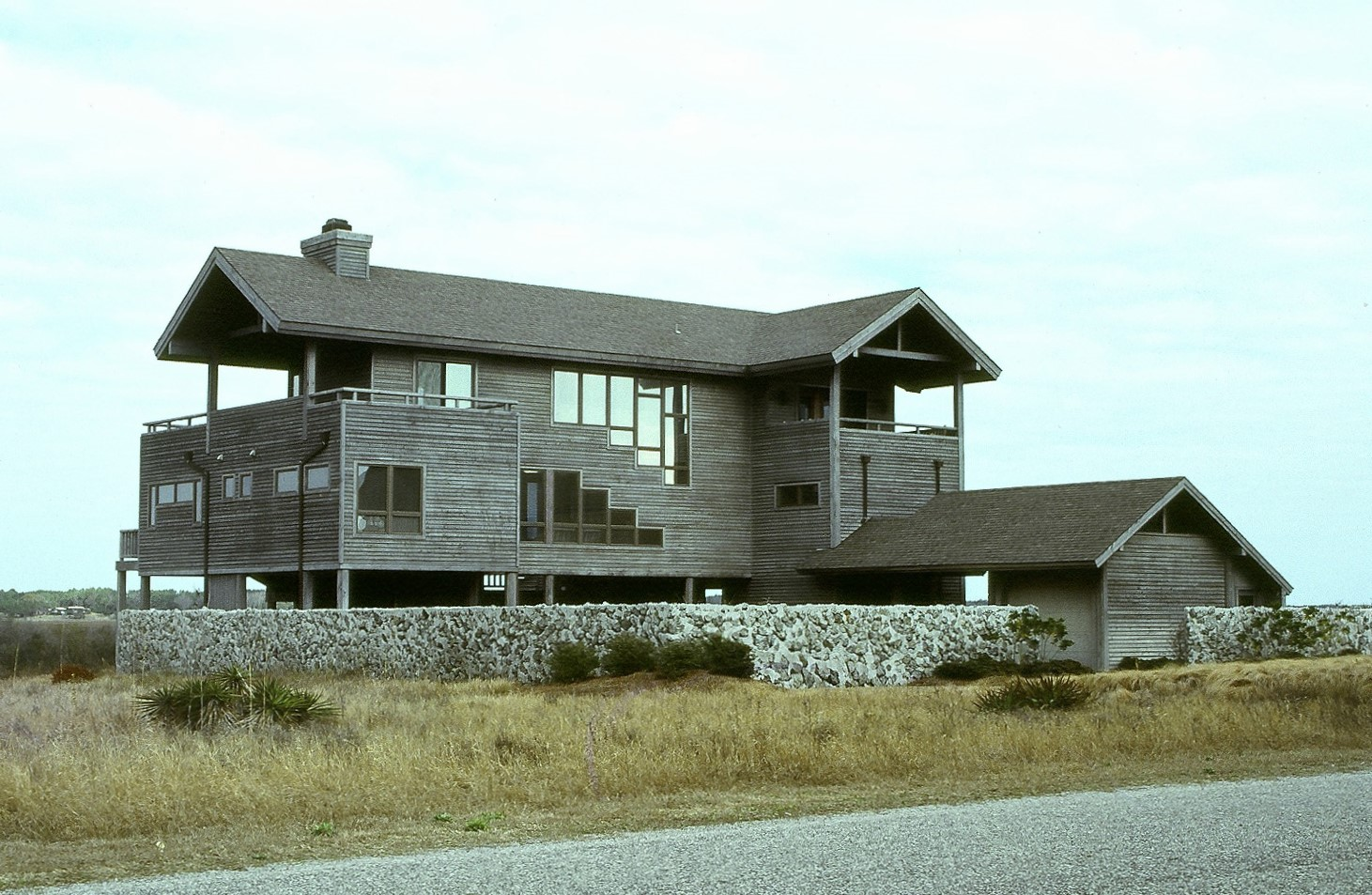
Birrell Residence, Figure Eight Island, North Carolina (1984)

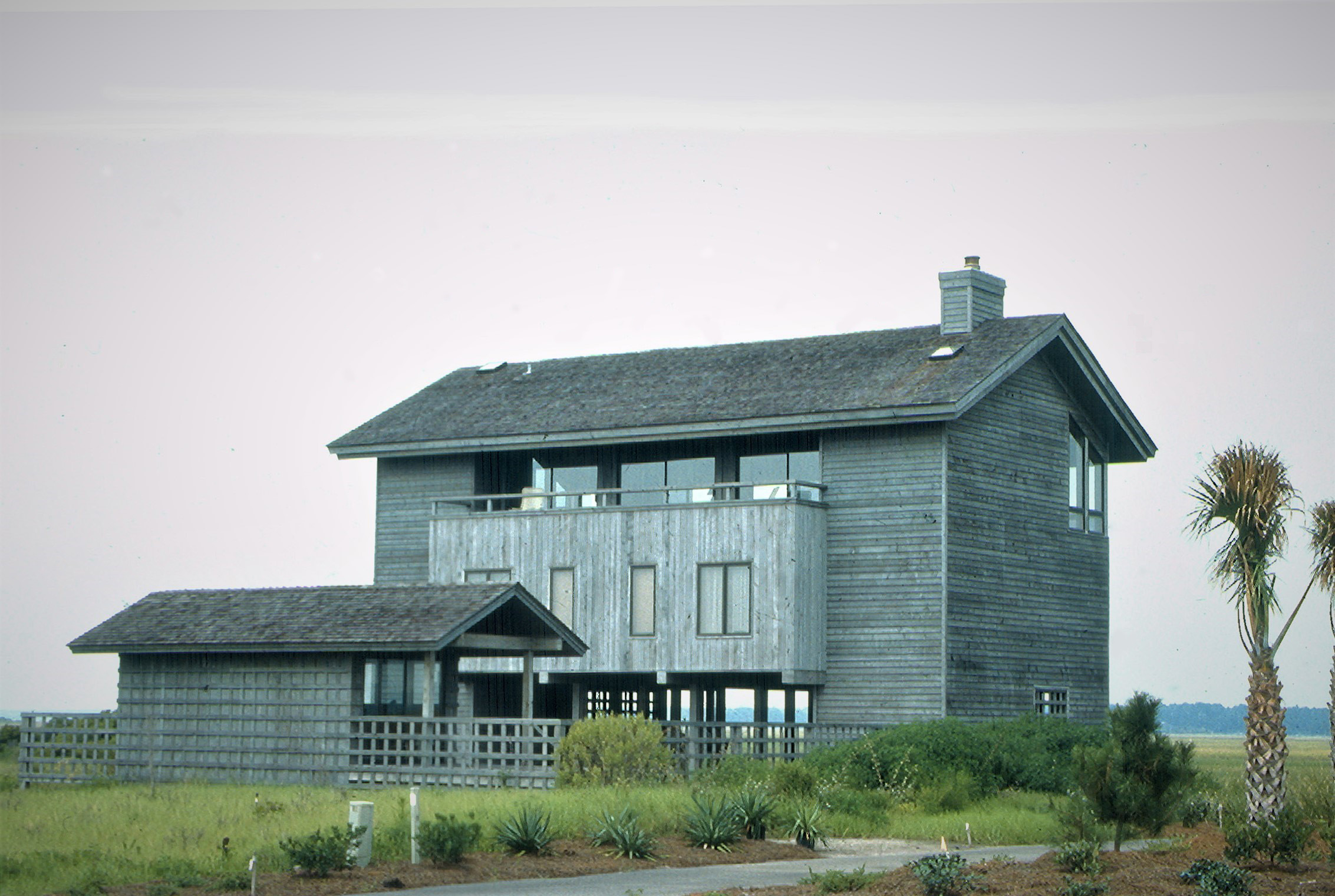
Eskey Residence, Figure Eight Island, North Carolina (1980's)

Ligon B. Flynn, FAIA (February 24, 1931 – September 26, 2010), was an American architect who practiced in North Carolina — noted for his coastal residential projects in southeastern North Carolina, primarily in the Wilmington area.

On the receipt of his professional archives, North Carolina State University said "Flynn’s approach to design was marked by a kind of holistic environmentalism. He prioritized daylight and natural ventilation and wanted indoor and outdoor spaces to seem interchangeable."

== Background ==
Born near Tryon, North Carolina to parents Broadus Bryan Flynn, a rural Postal Carrier and Myrtle Shields Flynn. After becoming an Eagle Scout, Flynn attended North Carolina State University School of Design in Raleigh, North Carolina (then N.C. State College), graduating in 1963.

Flynn and his wife Susan Hardin Flynn had a son and daughter.

An avid painter and amateur photographer, Flynn documented the vanishing tobacco barns of eastern North and South Carolina which led to an exhibit “Down Tobacco Road” at the Cape Fear Museum in Wilmington in 2001, 2002, and again in 2009. The photos were subsequently published in the book, “Tobacco Barns” printed via Lulu.com in 2007. His early paintings were exhibited in NC Artist's Annual Exhibits and The National Gallery of Art Water Color Exhibit in Washington, DC.

In February 2009 Ligon suffered a stroke; he died September 26, 2010. His papers and project files were donated by his wife to the North Carolina State University Libraries Special Collections Research Center (SCRC)'

== Career ==
After teaching at the School of Design from 1963 thru 1967 he started his firm Ligon B. Flynn Architects in 1969. He was joined by Henry Johnston in 1971 and the firm relocated to Wilmington, North Carolina in 1972 to work with developer Young Smith of Figure Eight Island Development Company and Landscape architect Richard Bell to masterplan the north end of the island. The partnership with Henry Johnston ended in 1976 and Ligon continued as a solo practice.

The firm developed offices at Litchfield by the Sea, Brookgreen Gardens Visitor Center in Murrells Inlet, South Carolina, the original St. John’s Art Gallery, Chandlers Wharf, Lower Cape Fear Hospice, and an addition to Thalian Hall in Wilmington, and was noted for his numerous elevated or piling residences of Figure Eight Island and the coast of North Carolina. Of note, the Eskey Residence, Loutit Residence, Melvin Residence, the Bob Timberlake (artist) Residence, Doherty Residence, Simons Residence, Birrell Residence, Roberts Residence, and Ellison Residence, aka "Ligon Point".

A self-proclaimed "short, red headed country boy trying to do good work", tenets of his work included "every building must have a garden" and “there should always be a breeze.”

== Awards ==
Over the course of his active career, Flynn won numerous honors, including the 1993 Kamphoefner Prize from the N.C. Architecture Foundation. and six design awards from the AIA North Carolina, including one for his firm’s office at 15 S. Second Street, Wilmington, North Carolina in 1993, now called ”The Atrium by Ligon Flynn”.
