= Shipwreck House =

House on Figure Eight Island, North Carolina

Coordinates: 34.2906°N 77.7198°W

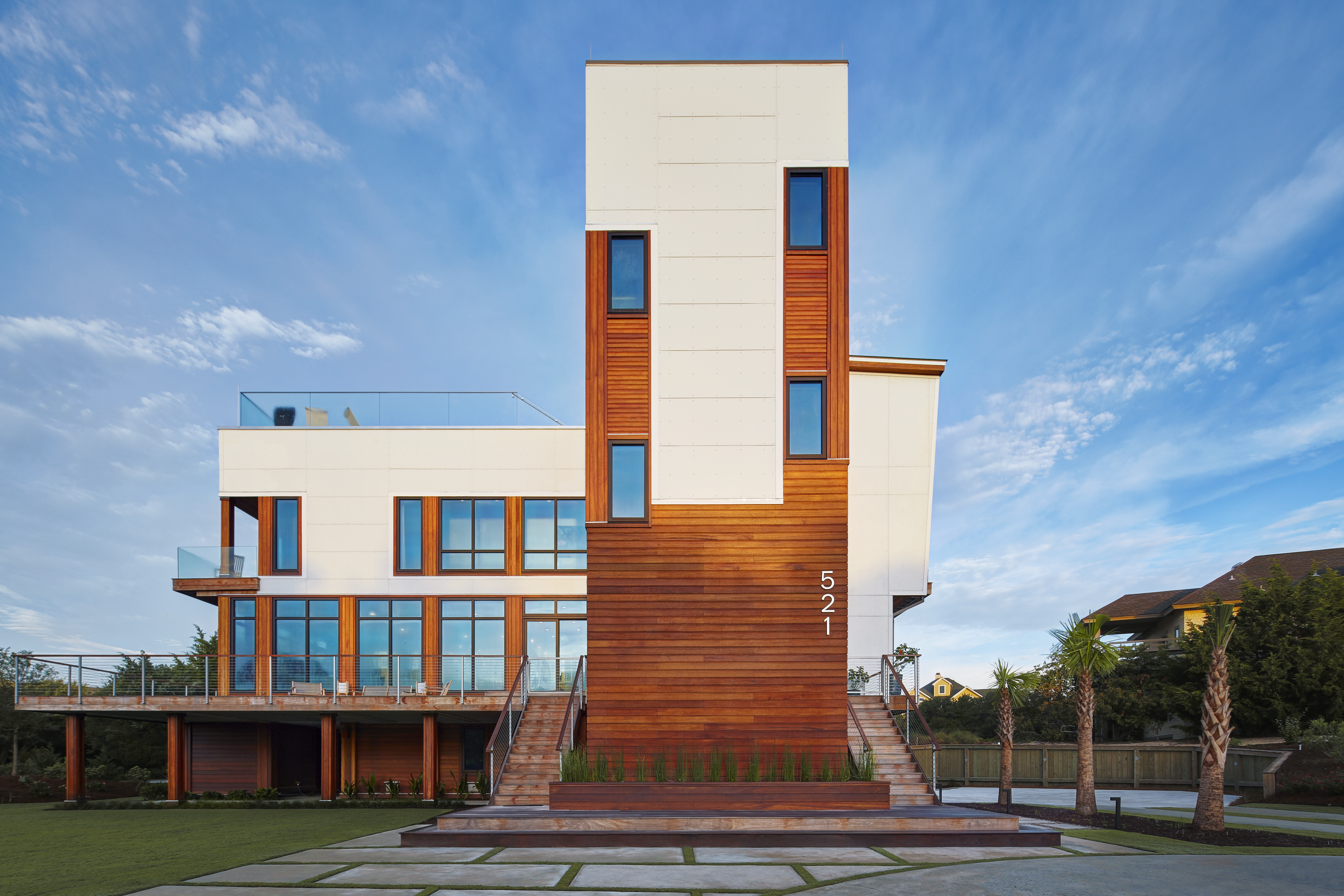
- Shipwreck House in 2020
- Interactive map of the Shipwreck House area

General information
- Status: private residence
- Type: beach house
- Architectural style: Modernist
- Location: 521 Beach Road N Wilmington, North Carolina
- Completed: 2015

Design and construction
- Architects: Tongue & Groove Design + Build

Shipwreck House is a mansion on Figure Eight Island, off the coast of Wilmington, North Carolina. The house is named for the 1877 shipwreck of the lumber schooner John S. Lee, which was discovered on the grounds where it was built.

== History ==
Shipwreck House was built for Will Spencer and Christy Spencer in 2015 by Tongue & Groove Design + Build on Figure Eight Island, a private island off the coast of Wilmington, North Carolina.

The house takes its name from the wreck of the John S. Lee, a lumber schooner that was lost at sea on April 17, 1877. The ship's remains were discovered on the house's lot in 2015, during construction.

Shipwreck House is 4,056 square feet and includes four bedrooms and a roof top bar and swimming pool with views of both the Atlantic Ocean and the Intracoastal Waterway.
