= The Litchfield Company =

- Industry: Real estate development
- Founded: 1956; 70 years ago in South Carolina
- Founders: A. Foster McKissick; James Bernice Moore; Bill Miller Sr.; Others

The Litchfield Company was founded as a real estate development company in South Carolina in 1956 by A. Foster McKissick, James Bernice Moore, and Bill Miller Sr., among others.

== History ==
The company owned a significant amount of land in the Pawleys Island area of South Carolina and spent forty years developing highly-amenitized resort communities stretching from the Atlantic Ocean to the Waccamaw River, many golf courses, and a large marina. The largest of those properties include:

- Litchfield by the Sea
- Willbrook Plantation
- The River Club
- The Reserve at Litchfield
- Reserve Harbor Marina
- Prince Creek (Murrells Inlet)
- The Tradition (Centex Homes)

After the company developed most of the land it owned, many properties and company divisions were sold or dissolved. The Litchfield Beach and Golf Resort, which includes the resort, hotel, Litchfield Racquet Club, and three golf courses is now owned and operated by Myrtle Beach National Company. Waccamaw Management, a division which handled property management and landscaping, was sold and currently manages properties throughout the Grand Strand, including most of the properties originally developed by TLCo. The Reserve Golf Club was purchased by its members, and now operates independently. Additionally, the Reserve Harbor Marina was purchased by Morningstar Marinas of Matthews, NC. It now operates as the Reserve Harbor Yacht Club.

== The Litchfield Company today ==
The company's real estate brokerage division was recently purchased by two local businessmen, and operates as The Litchfield Company Real Estate, LLC. Today, the company is recognized as one of the largest resort sales and marketing firms in the southeast. The company is still located in the original Litchfield Company building on Ocean Highway near the entrance to Litchfield By The Sea.

== See also ==
- Litchfield Theatres
