= Hurricane Bertha (1996) =

Category 3 Atlantic hurricane in 1996

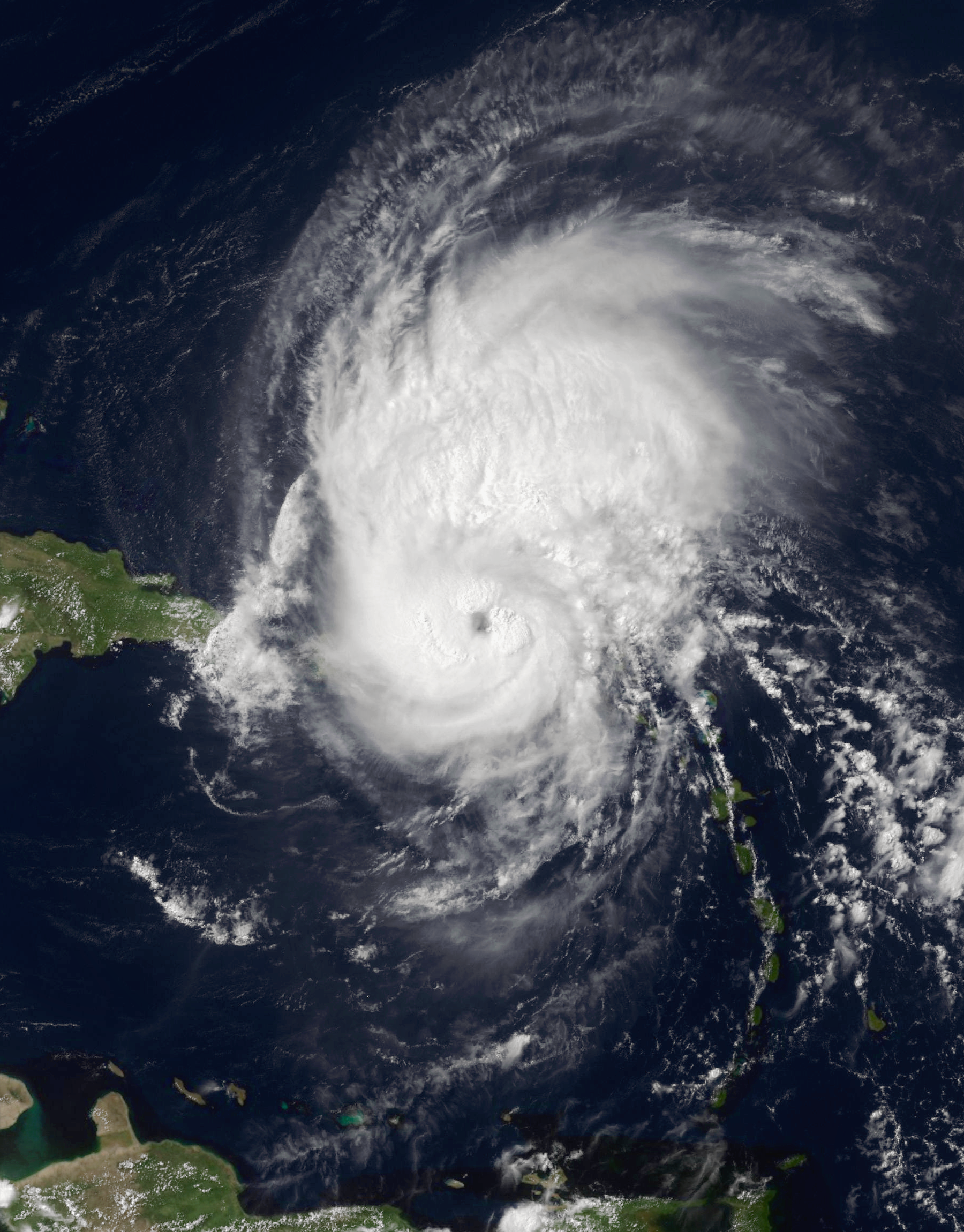
- Bertha near peak intensity just north of Hispaniola on July 8

Meteorological history
- Formed: July 5, 1996
- Extratropical: July 14, 1996
- Dissipated: July 18, 1996

Category 3 major hurricane
- 1-minute sustained (SSHWS/NWS)
- Highest winds: 115 mph (185 km/h)
- Lowest pressure: 960 mbar (hPa); 28.35 inHg

Overall effects
- Fatalities: 12
- Damage: $335 million (1996 USD)
- Areas affected: Leeward Islands, Puerto Rico, North Carolina, Mid-Atlantic States, New England, Atlantic Canada, Southern Greenland
- IBTrACS
- Part of the 1996 Atlantic hurricane season

Hurricane Bertha was an intense and early-season major hurricane that affected areas from the Leeward Islands to the United States in July of the 1996 Atlantic hurricane season. The second named storm, first hurricane, and first major hurricane during the season, Bertha originated from a tropical wave that moved off the coast of Africa in early July. Steadily organizing while moving generally towards the west, the disturbance was designated as a tropical depression at 0000 UTC on July 5, and was further upgraded to a tropical storm by 1200 UTC later that day. Over the next few days, continued intensification occurred, and Bertha became a Category 1 hurricane on the Saffir-Simpson hurricane scale, the first hurricane of the season, prior to moving through the northern Leeward Islands. Late on July 8, a period of rapid intensification began, and at 0600 UTC on July 9, Bertha reached its peak intensity with maximum sustained winds of 115 mph (185 km/h) with a minimum barometric pressure of 960 mbar (28 inHg). Moving around the western periphery of the subtropical ridge, Bertha passed north of the Bahamas as a weakening hurricane before turning towards the north-northeast and undergoing another period of rapid intensification. Late on July 12, Bertha made landfall between Wrightsville Beach and Topsail Beach, North Carolina with winds of 105 mph (169 km/h). Gradual weakening ensued the following day as Bertha moved up the Mid-Atlantic and into New England before becoming an extratropical cyclone on July 14. The storm's remnants persisted for another several days, before dissipating on July 18.

As Bertha passed through the northern Leeward Islands, it caused moderate to severe damage. In the United States Virgin Islands, heavy rainfall, hurricane-force winds, and significant property damage was reported. In addition, many boats were destroyed, and total damage was estimated near $7.5 million (1996 USD). In Puerto Rico, effects from Bertha were very similar to those in the U.S. Virgin Islands. Heavy rainfall was recorded, peaking over half a foot in isolated areas. Despite this, reports of widespread inland flooding were scarce. Tropical storm-force winds were observed, which is the cause of two indirect fatalities, when they died in a traffic accident. One death was directly attributed to Bertha when a tourist drowned in rough seas in Luquillo, Puerto Rico. Damage in Puerto Rico was also estimated to be near $7.5 million. The most devastating effects from the hurricane occurred in the United States, more specifically the state of North Carolina. Several fishing piers, marinas, and boats were destroyed as a result of Bertha's storm surge, and buildings across the eastern portion of the state were significantly damaged. Moderate rainfall spread across much of the Mid-Atlantic and Northeast as Bertha moved towards the north, along with winds in excess of tropical storm force. In total, twelve fatalities were caused by Hurricane Bertha, primarily in Florida from rough seas.

== Meteorological history ==
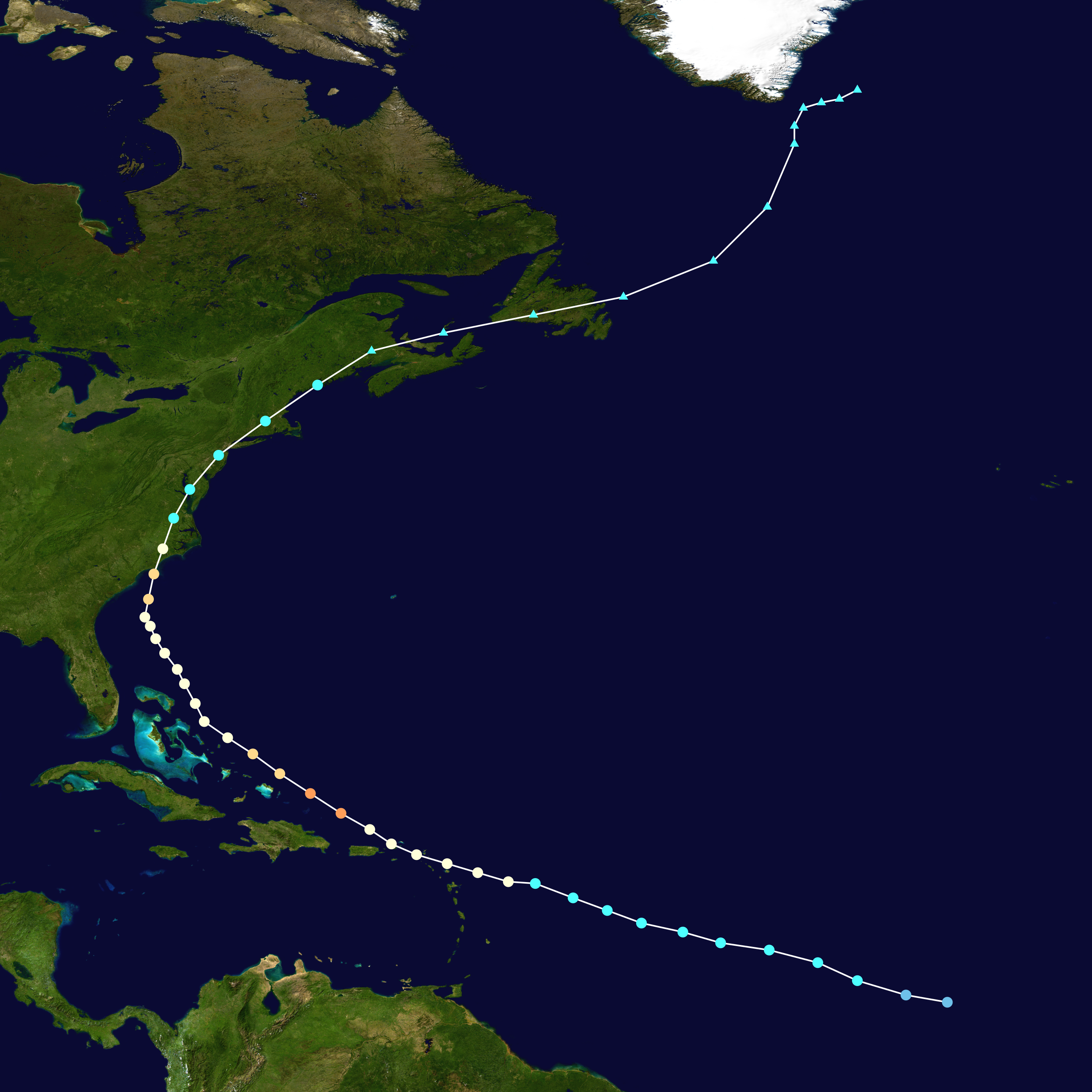
Map plotting the storm's track and intensity, according to the Saffir–Simpson scale Map key Saffir–Simpson scale Tropical depression (≤38 mph, ≤62 km/h) Tropical storm (39–73 mph, 63–118 km/h) Category 1 (74–95 mph, 119–153 km/h) Category 2 (96–110 mph, 154–177 km/h) Category 3 (111–129 mph, 178–208 km/h) Category 4 (130–156 mph, 209–251 km/h) Category 5 (≥157 mph, ≥252 km/h) Unknown Storm type Tropical cyclone Subtropical cyclone Extratropical cyclone, remnant low, tropical disturbance, or monsoon depression

On July 1, 1996, a tropical wave emerged off of the coast of Africa. On July 3, a weak low-level circulation developed while located 500 miles (800 km) south of Cape Verde. The disturbance moved westward, and on July 5, it strengthened into a tropical depression in the central Atlantic. The depression tracked westward across the open waters of the Atlantic along the western periphery of a subtropical ridge. Later that day, the depression was upgraded to a tropical storm and was named Bertha. Over the next three days, Bertha tracked west-northwest while gradual intensification was occurring. On July 7, Bertha was upgraded to a hurricane with sustained winds of 75 mph (121 km/h) while east of Guadeloupe.

The next day, the center of circulation passed over Antigua as Bertha traversed the extreme northeastern portion of the Caribbean Sea causing moderate to minor damages. After that, Bertha passed rapidly in the southern portion of Sint Maarten. The storm gradually turned to the northwest on July 9 as maximum sustained winds reached 115 mph (185 km/h) while located 120 miles (190 km) northwest of Puerto Rico. Because the highest winds were located on the northeastern portion of the circulation, Puerto Rico received only tropical storm force winds near 50 mph. Forward speed slowed to 15 mph (24 km/h) as Bertha passed within 60 miles (97 km) of the Turks and Caicos, just before reaching its peak intensity.

Continuing its gradual turn, the track soon became north-northwest as the forward speed slowed further to 10 mph (16 km/h) on July 10 and July 11. On July 12, Bertha made landfall between Wrightsville Beach and Topsail Beach. Bertha lost hurricane intensity just after landfall. It then accelerated to the northeast along the East Coast of the United States, producing winds of up to 60 mph (97 km/h). It moved north, and lost all of its tropical characteristics by July 14. However, the storm's extratropical remnant continued moving northeastward for another several days, before dissipating on July 18, near Greenland.

== Impact ==
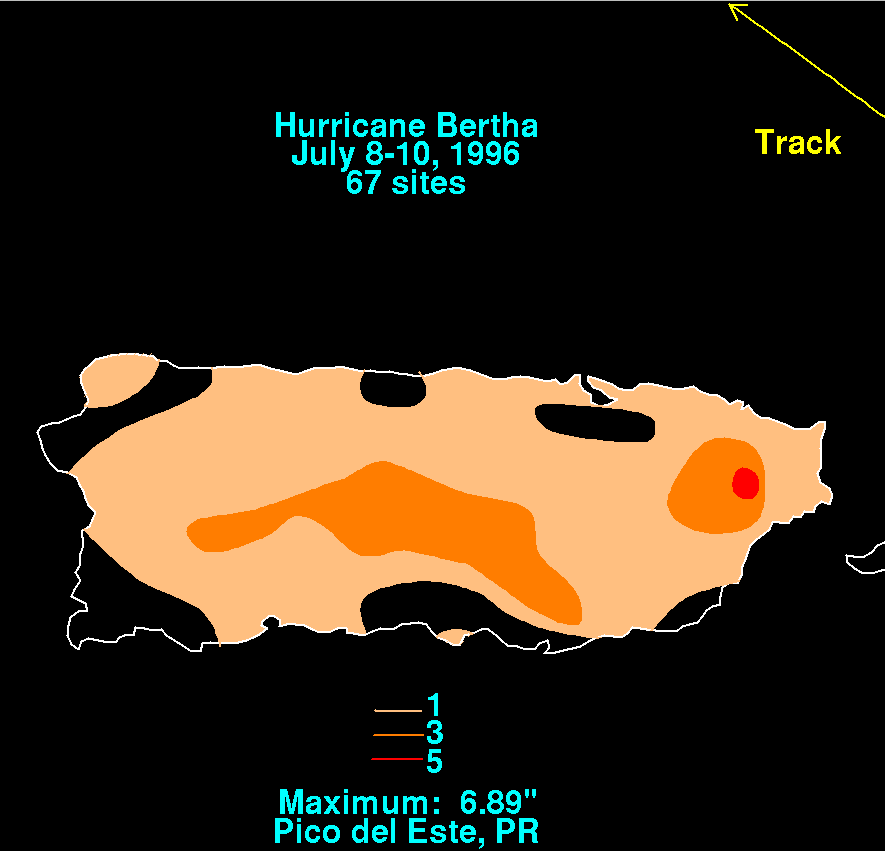
Rainfall from Hurricane Bertha in Puerto Rico

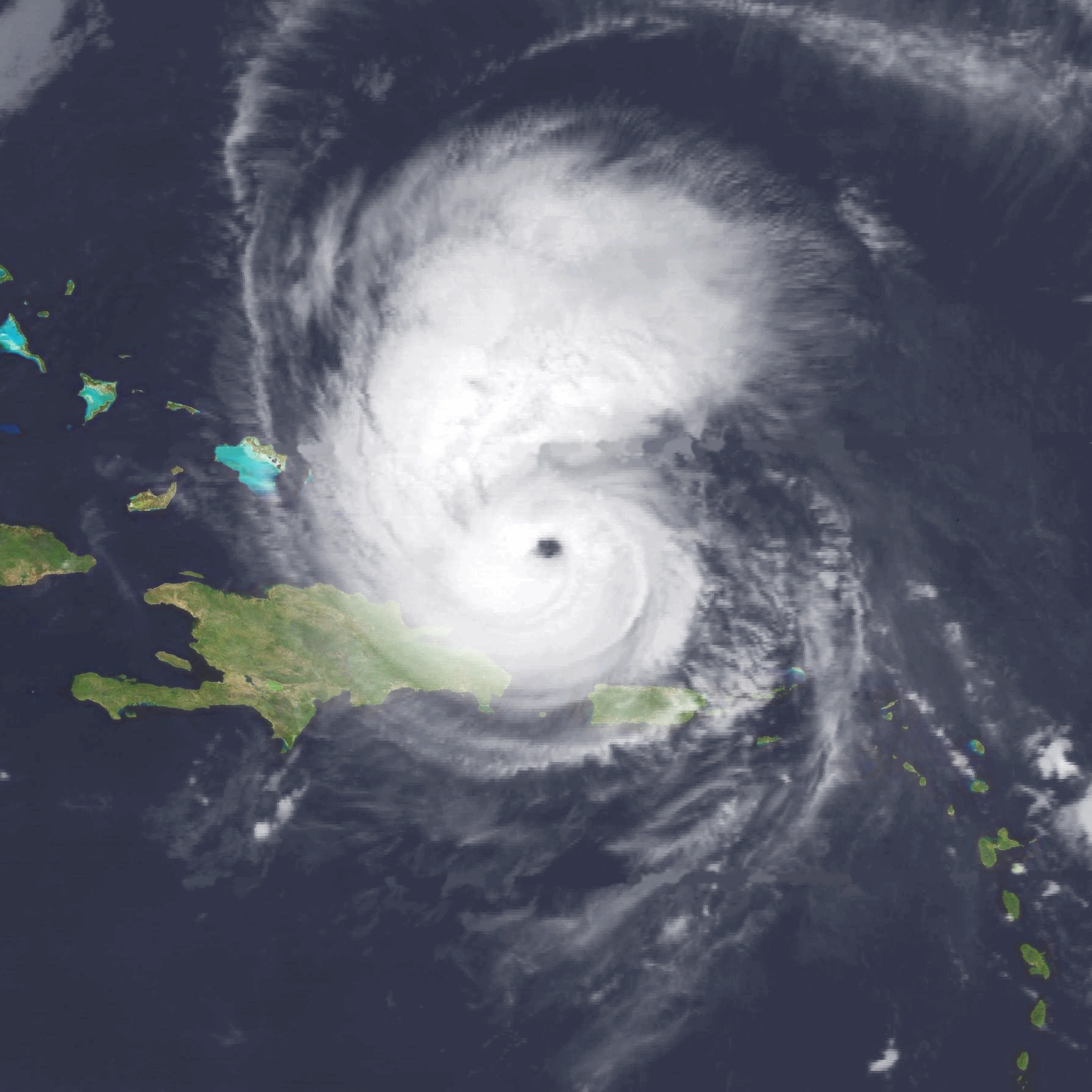
Satellite Image of Hurricane Bertha situated just north of Hispanola at peak intensity during the early morning hours of July 9, 1996

=== U.S. Virgin Islands and Puerto Rico ===
In the United States Virgin Islands, rainfall from Bertha peaked at 3.28 in (83 mm) on Saint Thomas. Winds from the storm were reported to be sustained at 85 mph (137 km/h) with an unofficial observation of 100 mph (160 km/h). Two boats were destroyed, five were grounded, and nine others washed ashore. One injury occurred in Coral Bay as a man rode out the storm in his sailboat. The Federal Emergency Management Agency (FEMA) reported that 1,415 homes were damaged, 43 of which lost their roofs. Governor Roy Schneider noted that there were at least 20 boats that blew ashore in Charlotte Amalie. Damages from the storm were estimated at $7.5 million.

The maximum rainfall reported in association with Bertha was 8.17 in (208 mm) along the Rio Icacos in Naguabo. Wind reports from the Roosevelt Roads Naval Base on July 8 indicated a maximum sustained wind speed of 44 mph (71 km/h). Although heavy rain did occur, there was no widespread or significant inland flooding reported. There were, however, several reports of swollen rivers which caused some minor flooding of low lying and urban areas; coastal flooding was reported from Carolina to Loiza along road 187. In addition, recorded rainfall at the Luis Muñoz Marín International Airport was 1.56 in (40 mm).

One death is attributed to Hurricane Bertha; a tourist drowned while surfing in high seas at the Playa Azul beach area in Luquillo. Two other deaths occurred indirectly as a result of Bertha; two people died in a traffic accident while tropical storm force winds were occurring. The hardest hit area was the municipality of Culebra, where most of the damage was to agriculture and commerce. However, because damages were minimum, none of the municipalities were declared disaster areas. The Housing Department estimated damages to homes at $410,000. The agricultural damages were estimated at $6 million in the San Juan, Caguas, and Ponce Regions, mostly wind damage to coffee, plantain, and banana crops. In all, it is estimated that $7.5 million in damage in Puerto Rico were attributed to Bertha.

=== Elsewhere in the Caribbean ===
On Antigua, the storm brought sustain winds of 35 mph (56 km/h) and gusts up to 60 mph (97 km/h). Damage throughout the country of Antigua and Barbuda was regarded as generally minor, limited to mainly 10 homes. Electricity was restored by July 9. The Bahamas and the north coast of the Dominican Republic likely suffered light damage, though no damage figures are available for either.

=== United States ===
==== Southeastern United States ====
Weather radar animation of Hurricane Bertha rainbands at landfall

In Florida, a man was caught in rip currents offshore Jacksonville Beach and drowned. Farther south, swells also lashed the coasts of Broward, Miami-Dade, and Palm Beach Counties. Throughout the area, beach patrols and lifeguards made dozens of rescues. Two other people drowned from rip currents in separate incidents at an unguarded section of Miami Beach. An additional fatality occurred in the state after a military jet evacuating the storm crashed into a house.

Minimal impact was reported in Georgia, mainly limited to about $2 million in lost revenue for local businesses along the east coast of the state. In South Carolina, gale-force winds affected the coast, while 6–8 feet (1.8–2.4 m) tides caused minor beach erosion. Wind gusts up to 78 mph (126 km/h) in Cherry Grove left some damage in Horry County, totalling $784,000.

==== North Carolina ====
When Bertha made landfall between Wrightsville Beach and Topsail Beach, North Carolina, it brought a storm surge of 8–10 feet (2.4–3.0 m) to the coast of the state. Several fishing piers and marinas were destroyed along with numerous boats. A few locations reported sustained hurricane-force winds, including 89 mph (143 km/h) at Frying Pan Shoals, 81 mph (130 km/h) at the New River, 78 mph (126 km/h) in Topsail Beach, and 77 mph (124 km/h) in North Topsail Beach. Several locations recorded hurricane-force wind gust, with the highest being 116 mph (187 km/h) at Frying Pan Shoals. Tropical storm force winds were observed throughout much of eastern North Carolina.

In Onslow County, 199 structures were destroyed, of which 117 were mobile homes. In New Hanover County, 1,750 buildings sustained damage. In Kure Beach, near where Bertha made landfall, 3 homes had their roofs blown off and all structures in the area were damaged. Losses in New Hanover reached about $19 million. In Pender County, 40 homes were undermined by beach erosion and four were destroyed. Damages in the county were estimated at $14.5 million. Agricultural losses in Wayne, Wilson, and Johnston Counties were estimated at $21 million.

==== Mid-Atlantic ====
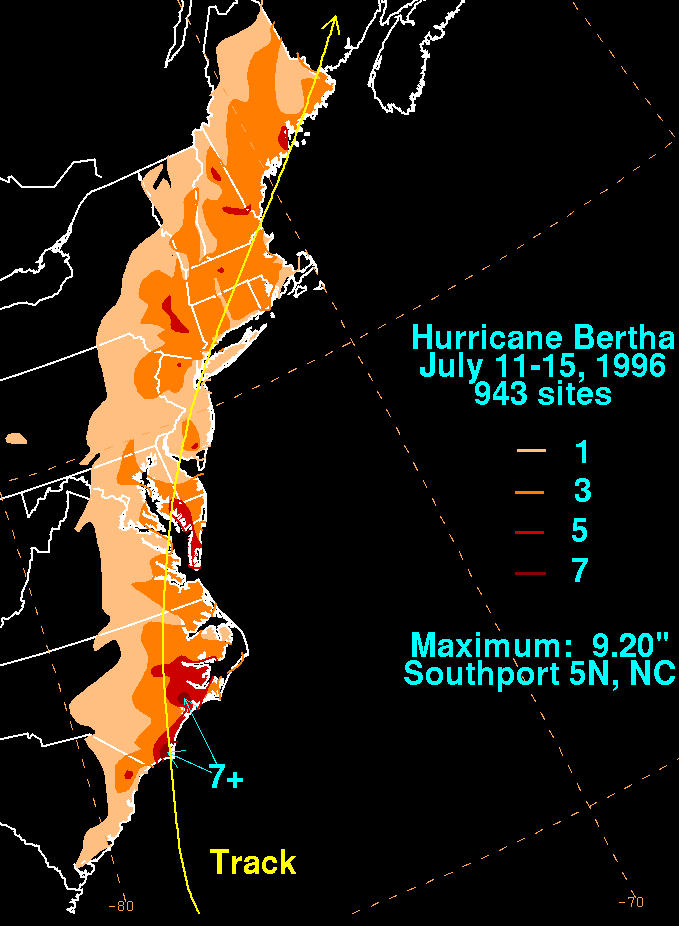
Rainfall from Hurricane Bertha in the mainland United States

As Bertha passed through southeastern Virginia and the lower Delmarva Peninsula, strong feeder bands produced strong wind gusts in the area. In King George County, a roof was blown onto a tree, while a garage collapsed and a metal shed was demolished. Near the community of Butzner Corner in Stafford County, siding was ripped from a few homes, one of which also suffered damage to the skylight. Wind gusts up to 80 mph (130 km/h) in Stafford County felled trees in the Fredericksburg area. Falling tree limbs in Portsmouth caused temporary power outages. Over 4 in (100 mm) of rain fell across southeastern Virginia.

Tides in Washington, D.C. increased to 2 to 3 feet (0.61 to 0.91 m) above normal, causing minor flooding at Hains Point and the Waterfront.

In Maryland, Bertha spawned three tornadoes along the western shore of Chesapeake Bay. The first event occurred in subdivisions behind a shopping center in California, where 30 homes sustained minor to moderate damage, mainly siding, shutters, and shingles. A few fences were blown down, with a portion of one residence's fence blown through another home's bedroom window. A roof was partially torn from a home, with some ceiling and deck damage. A shed reportedly was flipped onto an unoccupied automobile. Other cars were slightly damaged by fallen limbs. Approximately 20 trees were snapped. The second tornado was spawned in Charlotte Hall; the twister stripped off a large portion of a barn's sheet metal roof. A garage containing auto repair machinery collapsed, and an adjacent home's brick chimney was also toppled. Several trees were snapped or uprooted. Eight homes sustained minor damage, with three others suffering moderate to major damage.

A third tornado struck extreme northwest Calvert County, causing the roof and a chimney of a predominantly wood-constructed farm house to collapse. The home was temporarily uninhabitable. At least one wall was near failure. A second chimney collapsed at a nearby home. Numerous trees were snapped or uprooted along the path, and one home in an estates subdivision sustained damage to its gutters. Another tornado was spawned in Madison in Dorchester County, which is on the eastern shore of Chesapeake Bay. The twister downed numerous trees and power lines blown down, resulting in scattered property damage and power outages. Strong winds felled trees and large limbs, damaging five homes in Calvert County. The combination of rain, gusty winds, and isolated severe weather left approximately 45,000 customers without electricity on the western shore. The Fenwick Island Buoy, which is just offshore along the Delaware-Maryland border, recorded a sustained wind speed of 47 mph (76 km/h), while the highest gust observed was 63 mph (101 km/h) at Ocean City. Rainfall amounts generally ranged from 3 to 5 in (76 to 127 mm) and caused some street flooding in southeastern Maryland.

Along the coast of Delaware, tidal flooding was minor and occurred on Route 54 near Fenwick Island. Two days before Bertha arrived, rough surf resulted in 40 water rescues at Bethany Beach. Seashore state campgrounds were closed and shelters were set up, but less than 100 persons used them. Approximately 1.5–3.0 in (38–76 mm) of rain fell, while SKYWARN Spotters reported around 4 in (100 mm) of precipitation in Sussex County. This inundated some areas with poor drainage, though the only river to flood was the Christina River in New Castle County. Wind gusts reached 58 mph (93 km/h) in Dover. Throughout the state, 3,200 homes lost electricity, but many for only eight hours. At Bethany Beach, a few poles were snapped and tree limbs came down. Strong winds downed trees in Clayton, blocking three roads. The roof was blown off one house and the porch roof was blown off another. Several poles were also knocked down. Flying debris caused damage to several other garages, homes, and porches. Near Blackiston, a large storage shed was destroyed.

In Pennsylvania, the storm brought wind gusts up to 40 mph (64 km/h) in the Philadelphia area. Winds downed weak trees and limbs, with one heavily damaging a house in Plymouth Township. Due to winds and severe thunderstorms associated with Bertha, approximately 60,000 customers lost electricity, primarily in Bucks County. Precipitation amounts between 2 and 4 in (51 and 102 mm) in 12 to 18 hours resulted in poor drainage flooding.

Tropical Storm Bertha passed through New Jersey on July 13, bringing wind gusts up to 63 mph (101 km/h). Some tree limbs and weak trees were downed, closing Second Street in Cape May. Approximately 95,000 homes lost power. Rainfall totals averaged between 2 and 4 in (51 and 102 mm), causing the Cooper River in Camden County, the Rockaway River in Morris County, and the Assunpink Creek at Trenton to overflow. However, since most of the rain fell during a 12‑ to 18‑hour period, there was mainly urban and poor drainage flooding. A few water rescues of trapped motorists occurred. Some minor tidal flooding occurred in Cape May County. Severe beach erosion was reported at Monmouth Beach, with 60 ft (18 m) of sand washed away. A 41-year-old man from New Egypt drowned while surfing at Ocean Beach. In addition, three firefighters rescued a man in Barnegat Bay who was attempting to tie down his boat.

Bertha produced rain and strong gusty winds in southern and eastern New York. In the latter, up to 4.5 in (110 mm) fell in Greenwood Lake, with low-lying and poor drainage areas, streams, and rivers across the area flooded. A portion of Interstate 278 in Kings County and Interstate 495 in Nassau County were also inundated. In eastern New York, 3 to 5 in (76 to 127 mm) of precipitation was common, with around 7 in (180 mm) in the Catskill Mountains and Hudson Valley. In Dutchess County, swollen small streams caused flooding in Beacon, Rhinebeck and Wappinger. The town of Claverack in Columbia County was flooded when the Claverack Creek exceeded its banks. Cranse and Jansen Kill Creeks also inundated. Numerous roads were closed throughout the county, including Route 22. In Ulster County, widespread flooding occurred in New Paltz and Kingston. At the latter, seven families were evacuated. Substantial flooding occurred along the waterfront in Kingston due to high flows from the Wallkill Creek, Rondout Creek, and high tides in the Hudson River. Numerous roads were closed throughout the county including routes 32, 32A, and 213 and county routes 6 and 30.

In Albany County, many roads and small streams were flooded. Flooding was most severe in Bethlehem, New Scotland, and Rensselaerville. Road inundation also occurred in Schenectady County, where the Schoharie Creek rose 1.5 ft (0.46 m) over flood stage. In Greene County, widespread flooding was reported in New Baltimore and Windham. A number of roads were closed throughout the county, including routes 32A and 296, as well as county routes 6 and 61. Several small bridges were washed out especially in Round Top, while minor flooding occurred along the Schoharie Creek. In Schoharie County roads were flooded and a bridge was washed out in Middleburg. Many town roads were washed out in Blenheim including Route 30. Flooding also occurred along the Schoharie Creek. In Rensselaer County, several roads were covered with water. The Schoharie Creek in Montgomery County rose to 2 ft (0.61 m) above flood state, resulting in evacuations in Lost Valley. Scattered power outages also occurred across eastern New York, when strong winds downed water-laden tree branches onto wires.

==== New England ====
In Connecticut, Bertha produced rainfall totals of 3 to 5 in (76 to 127 mm), with a maximum amount of 5.5 in (140 mm) in Vernon. Street inundation and minor river flooding occurred along the Park River in the Hartford area. The river reached flood stage of 8 ft (2.4 m) on July 13 and crested at 9 ft (2.7 m) a few hours later. Several roads and streams were flooded in Litchfield County. Scattered power outages also occurred due to strong winds downing water-laden tree branches onto wires. Flooding was reported in the city of Ridgefield in Fairfield County, as well as areas along the Mill River in New Haven County.

While passing through Rhode Island, a wind gust as strong as 74 mph (119 km/h) was observed in Middletown. Throughout the state, trees and tree limbs fell onto power lines, leaving up to 32,000 customers without electricity. Much of the power was restored within 12 hours. Rainfall peaked at 5.51 in (140 mm) in Coventry, causing street flooding and road washouts in that city, Cranston, and Warwick. Along the coast tides of 2 to 4 ft (0.61 to 1.22 m) above normal were observed. Minor beach erosion occurred along the exposed shores. Tropical Storm Bertha became only the tenth tropical cyclone in the 20th century to impact Rhode Island

In Massachusetts, Bertha brought a period of rainfall, high winds, and minor coastal flooding. Much of the state observed at least 3 in (76 mm) of precipitation, with a peak total of 6 in (150 mm) in Colrain. Small streams flooded in Berkshire, Franklin, Hampden, Hampshire, and southern Worcester counties. Street washouts were reported in southern Worcester County. Gusts up to 88 mph (142 km/h) occurred along the south coast from Cape Cod and the Islands to Westport, downing tree limbs and power lines, which caused power outages in the areas. Along the south coast, tides ran 2 to 4 ft (0.61 to 1.22 m) above normal, with swells of 12 to 18 ft (3.7 to 5.5 m). This inundated coastal roads for a few hours and flooded several marinas, causing minor damage to some boats.

In southern Vermont, rainfall was generally 3 to 5 inches (76 to 127 mm). Several roads and streams were flooded throughout the region, including low-lying areas adjacent to the Hoosic River in Bennington County. Strong winds downed water-laden tree branches onto wires, causing scattered power outages across the area. Further north, dirt roads around Ludlow were washed out and a mudslide was reported on Route 14 near Royalton. In New Hampshire, precipitation totals included 4.5 inches (110 mm) in Derry, 4.2 inches (110 mm) in Milfold, 3.5 inches (89 mm) in East Derry, 3 inches (76 mm) in Manchester, and 2.77 inches (70 mm) in Jaffrey. A combination of gusty winds and rainfall caused scattered power outages.

Impact from the storm in Maine was minor. A total of 4.11 inches (104 mm) of rain fell in Poland, while some areas experienced more than 6 inches (150 mm). Some ditch erosion, inundation of low-lying areas, streets, and basement flooding occurred. Power outages were reported in Lewiston and some adjacent towns. Route 219 was left impassable in Oxford County due to flooding in several locations. Overflowing streams inundated several streets in Abbot. Two bridges were damaged in Anson. Many roads in the Camden area were washed out. Two people were injured when the car they were riding in struck a 600 lb (270 kg) boulder, which had fallen onto the roadway because of the heavy rains. In the Castine area, streams that overflowed their banks flooded roadways. Minor flooding occurred along the Kennebec River in Kennebec County.

=== Canada ===
Shortly after becoming extratropical, the remnants of Bertha entered Canada through New Brunswick. In the southern portions of the province, the storm dropped 2.7 to 3.5 inches (69 to 89 mm) of rain, causing minor flooding. In Quebec, 6.88 inches (175 mm) on rainfall fell in Iles de la Madeleine, which was the highest precipitation total in Canada associated with the storm. The remnants of Bertha proceeded to move over Prince Edward Island. There, winds reached 42 mph (68 km/h), which caused power outages at 100 homes in Wood Islands and felled trees. Further south in Nova Scotia, the storm produced winds of 43 to 50 mph (69 to 80 km/h). As a result, widespread power outages were reported in Amherst, Antigonish, Bedford, Halifax, Wolfville, Truro, and Yarmouth, Nova Scotia. During the late hours of July 14 and early on July 15, the remnants of Bertha moved across Newfoundland. Up to 3.97 inches (101 mm) of rain fell near St. John's. Due to wet conditions and strong winds, officials of the annual Corner Brook Triathlon cancelled the bicycling portion of the event.

== See also ==
- Other storms of the same name
- Hurricane Bonnie (1998)
- Hurricane Fran (1996)
- Hurricane Isabel (2003)
- Hurricane Irene (2011)
- Hurricane Isaias (2020)
- List of North Carolina hurricanes (1980–1999)
- List of New Jersey hurricanes
