= Karen Beasley Sea Turtle Center =

American nonprofit conservation organization

Karen Beasley Sea Turtle Rescue and Rehabilitation Center
- Named after: Karen Beasley
- Formation: July 21, 1998; 27 years ago Date of incorporation.
- Founder: Jean Beasley
- Type: Nonprofit
- Purpose: Environmental organization devoted to the conservation, rescue, rehabilitation, and release of sea turtles.
- Headquarters: 302 Tortuga Lane, Surf City, North Carolina 28445
- Coordinates: 34.4421°N 77.5667°W
- Origins: Originated as the "Topsail Turtle Project" by Karen Beasley, later expanded and incorporated into a sea turtle center by her mother, Jean.
- Executive Director: Jean Beasley (1997 to 2021); Kathy Zagzebski (since 2021)
- Subsidiaries: Topsail Turtle Project
- Revenue: $1.7 million (2023)
- Expenses: $862,000 (2023)
- Website: https://www.seaturtlehospital.org/

The Karen Beasley Sea Turtle Rescue and Rehabilitation Center is an American nonprofit environmental organization in Surf City, North Carolina, devoted to the rescue, rehabilitation, and release of sick and injured sea turtles. It began from the Topsail Turtle Project, a volunteer initiative that works to preserve and protect sea turtle nests, nesting females, and hatchlings along Topsail Island's coastline.

Karen Beasley, a local woman who started the Turtle Project in her teens, died in 1991. She asked her mother to use her life insurance proceeds to start a rehabilitation center for injured sea turtles. It opened in 1997 and moved to a newer and larger site in 2013. It is the only sea turtle rehabilitation center in the state.

The center works to conserve and protect all species of marine turtles, both in the water and on the beach. It rescues, treats, and releases around 100 sea turtles each year, for a total of over 2,000 total turtles. They have also kept over 2,500 sea turtle nests safe so that young can safely hatch. The hospital provides year-round care for injured or stranded sea turtles, using advanced diagnostics and treatments such as medical-grade honey, physical therapy, and a therapy pool to aid recovery. Turtles receive environmental enrichment and naturalistic feeding to build strength and prepare for release. Research on the treatment of sick and injured sea turtles at the center has been published in academic journals. Some turtles are permanent residents at the center due to medical issues that prevent them from surviving in the wild.

== History ==
Karen Beasley's passion for sea turtles began in grade school when she witnessed a turtle laying eggs on the beach. She and her family routinely patrolled the beaches, erased turtle tracks to protect nests from predators, filled holes to aid nesting turtles, and monitored hatchlings. This eventually grew to include friends and other volunteers, becoming the Topsail Turtle Project in the mid-1980s. Its goal was to protect nesting sea turtles, their eggs, and hatchlings along the 26 miles (42 km) of Topsail Island's coastline.

Karen, a communications major at Wake Forest University, died from leukemia in 1991 at age 29. Before her death, she asked her mother, Jean, to use her life insurance funds to benefit sea turtles. Jean took up her daughter's mission and became the first executive director of both the Turtle Project and the rehabilitation center.

In 1996, the group cared for an injured turtle named Lucky, revealing the need for a turtle rehabilitation facility in North Carolina. That year, the town of Topsail Beach leased a plot of land, and by June 1997, the project had built an outdoor rehab area. In October 1997, it opened a 900-square-foot (84 m^{2}) facility, the first permanent location for the center.

In 1998, the Karen Beasley Sea Turtle Rescue and Rehabilitation Center, encompassing both the hospital and the nesting project, was incorporated as a nonprofit organization. Twelve years later, construction began on a 13,000-square-foot (1,200 m^{2}) center in Surf City. This modern space, opened in 2013, significantly expanded capacity for turtle care, volunteer operations, and educational outreach.

Jean Beasley stepped down as executive director in spring of 2021, remaining as a board emerita. She died in December 2025. Kathy Zagzebski has been the executive director since 2021.

== Operations ==
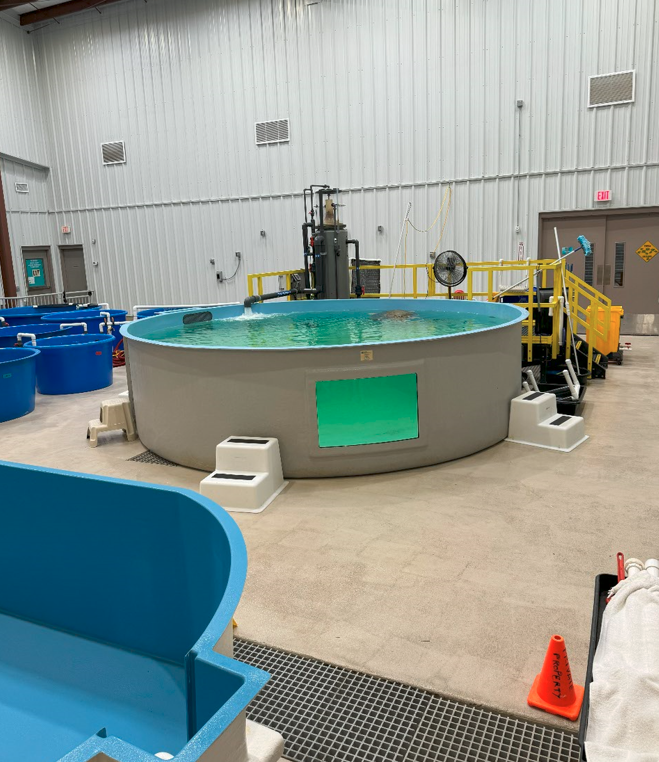
Tanks in the "sick bay" at the Karen Beasley Sea Turtle Center

=== Sea Turtle Hospital ===
The center, which welcomes visitors, operates year-round, treating turtles injured by boat strikes, fishing gear, cold-stunning, and other hazards. On intake, turtles receive hospital-grade diagnostics, including X-rays, MRIs, CT scans, and blood tests. Treatments may involve antibiotics, surgery, medical-grade honey, warm oil therapy, massages, and time in a therapy pool designed to mimic ocean currents.

Enrichment tools are placed in tanks to simulate natural environments and prevent boredom. Feeding practices are designed to encourage natural foraging behaviors, such as chasing live food or diving for greens.

The center is home to many notable patients. Lennie, a blind Kemp's ridley turtle, serves as its permanent resident and ambassador. She cannot be released due to her conditions. Snooki, a loggerhead turtle, also cannot be released as she is unable to swim underwater, necessary for survival in the wild. Other notable patients have included turtles injured by propellers, tangled in nets, or suffering from ingestion of pollutants such as gasoline.

=== Topsail Turtle Project ===
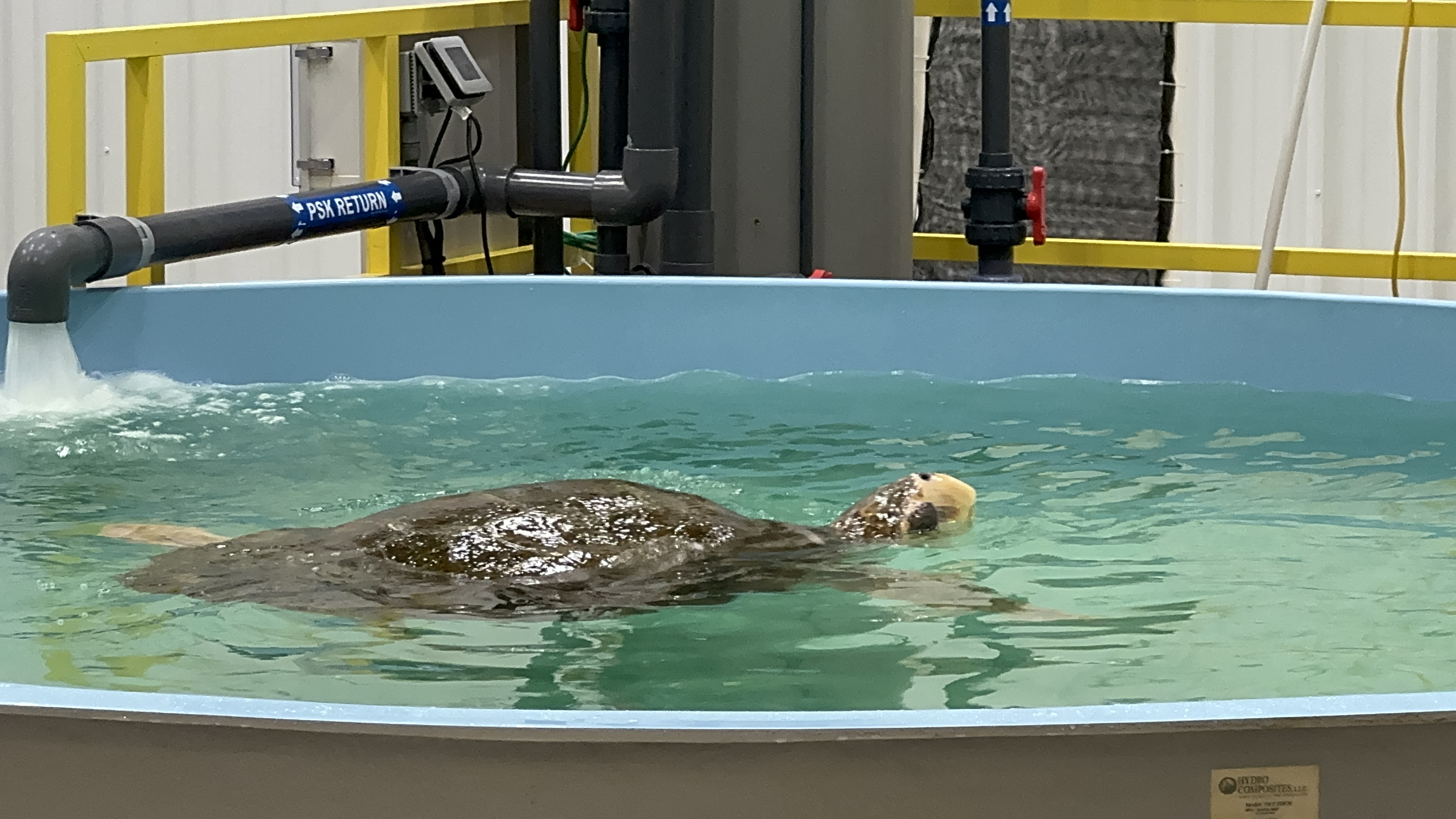
Snooki, a permanent resident at the Karen Beasley Sea Turtle Center

The Topsail Turtle Project, founded by Karen Beasley, began as a volunteer initiative to protect sea turtle nests and hatchlings along Topsail Island’s 26-mile beach. After Karen's death in 1991, her mother formalized the project into North Carolina’s first structured sea turtle conservation program. Now a key part of the Karen Beasley Sea Turtle Rescue and Rehabilitation Center, the project has protected over 2,600 nests and helped ensure the release of tens of thousands of hatchlings. Volunteers patrol the beach daily during nesting season, monitoring activity, searching for nests, and collecting conservation data.

== Outreach ==
The center conducts outreach activities to promote sea turtle conservation. Guided tours provide visitors with information about sea turtle biology, threats to marine ecosystems, and the rehabilitation process for injured turtles. Tours include access to observation areas such as the "sick bay" and "Sea Turtle Bay," where visitors can view turtles undergoing treatment and recovery. Between 40,000 and 60,000 visitors take the tour each year. Displays throughout the facility highlight conservation issues such as plastic pollution, habitat loss, and the ecological role of sea turtles in maintaining healthy oceans.

Beyond in-person visitation, the center engages the public through digital outreach and community campaigns. These efforts encourage environmentally responsible practices, such as reducing single-use plastics, cleaning up coastal litter, and supporting marine conservation legislation. The center also offers an internship program and participates in environmental education initiatives for students and youth organizations.

== Research ==
Since 2000, scientists working with the center and its turtles have published over 30 papers in academic journals devoted to veterinary medicine and turtle biology, such as the Journal of the American Veterinary Medical Association, Chelonian Conservation and Biology, the Journal of Wildlife Management, the Veterinary Record, Veterinary Medicine International and the Journal of Zoological and Botanical Gardens. Most discuss research into treating the sick and injured turtles the center has taken in; on a few papers center directors Beasley or Zagzebski have been credited as coauthors. The center's work has also informed a thousand-page textbook published in 2017, Sea Turtle Health and Rehabilitation.

== Finances ==
According to its Form 990 filings with the Internal Revenue Service, in 2023 the center raised $1.1 million for its programs from contributions and grants. An additional $450,000 came from the sales of merchandise, with $87,000 coming in from investments, bringing its total revenue to $1.6 million. From that amount it spent around $860,000, or roughly half, on its programs. Staff were paid around $275,000, and $20,000 was given to the North Carolina Veterinary Medical Foundation as a grant. The center listed a net balance of $7.1 million in assets against $20,000 in liabilities.
