= Topsail Island =

Barrier island in North Carolina, U.S.

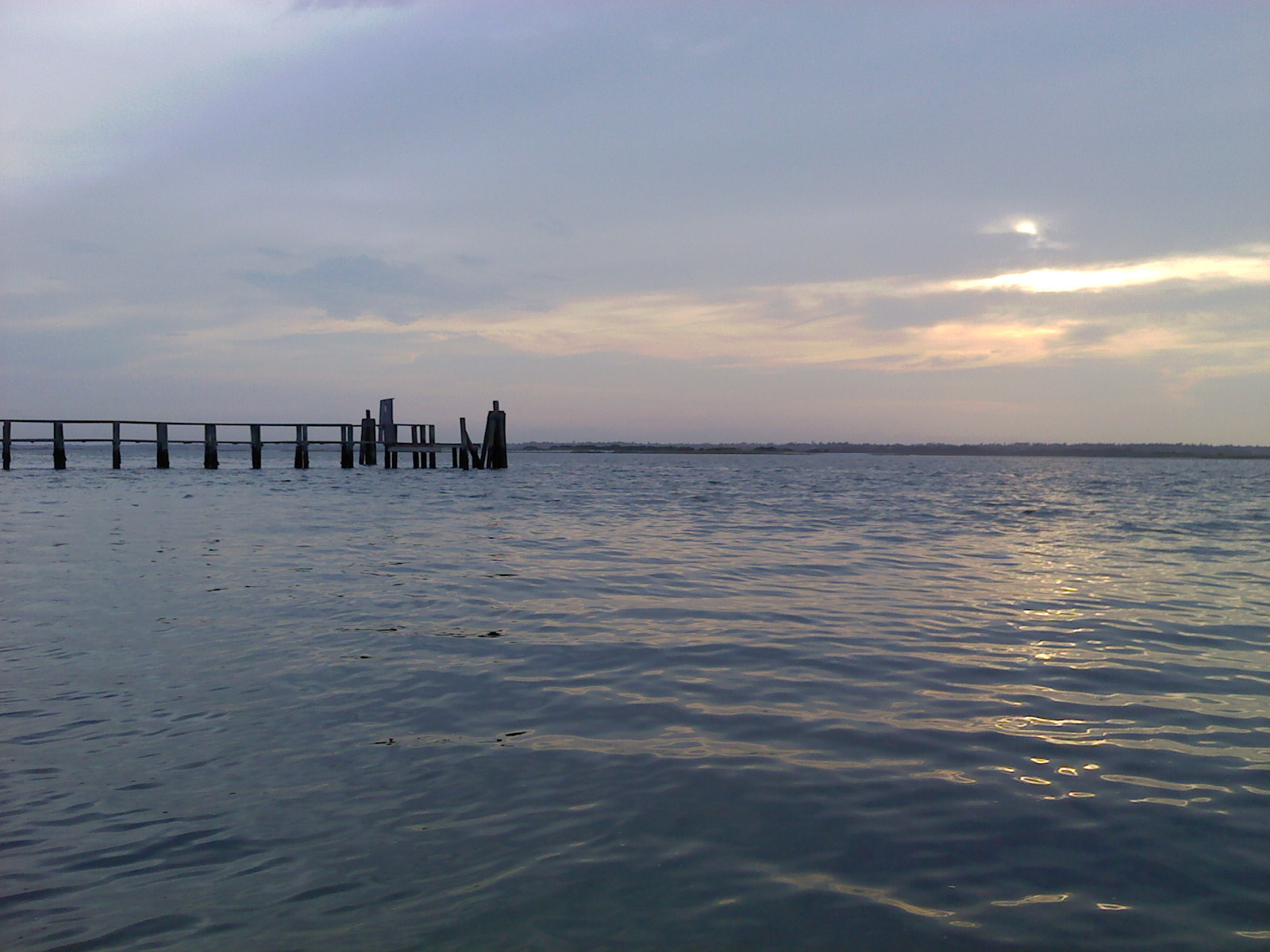
- Topsail Island sound side

- Location within North Carolina Location within the United States
- Interactive map of Topsail Island

Geography
- Location: Atlantic Ocean
- Coordinates: 34°28′11″N 77°28′19″W
- Length: 26 mi (42 km)

Administration
- US

Topsail Island (/ˈtɑːpsɪl/, TOP-sill) is a 26-mile (41.8 km) long barrier island off the coast of North Carolina, roughly equidistant between the barrier islands of the Crystal Coast and the beaches of the Cape Fear region, lying south of Jacksonville, North Carolina and Camp Lejeune. The northeastern edge of the island is the New River Inlet, and the southwestern edge is New Topsail Inlet. It is separated from the mainland by a series of small sounds and channels that make up a portion of the Atlantic Intracoastal Waterway.

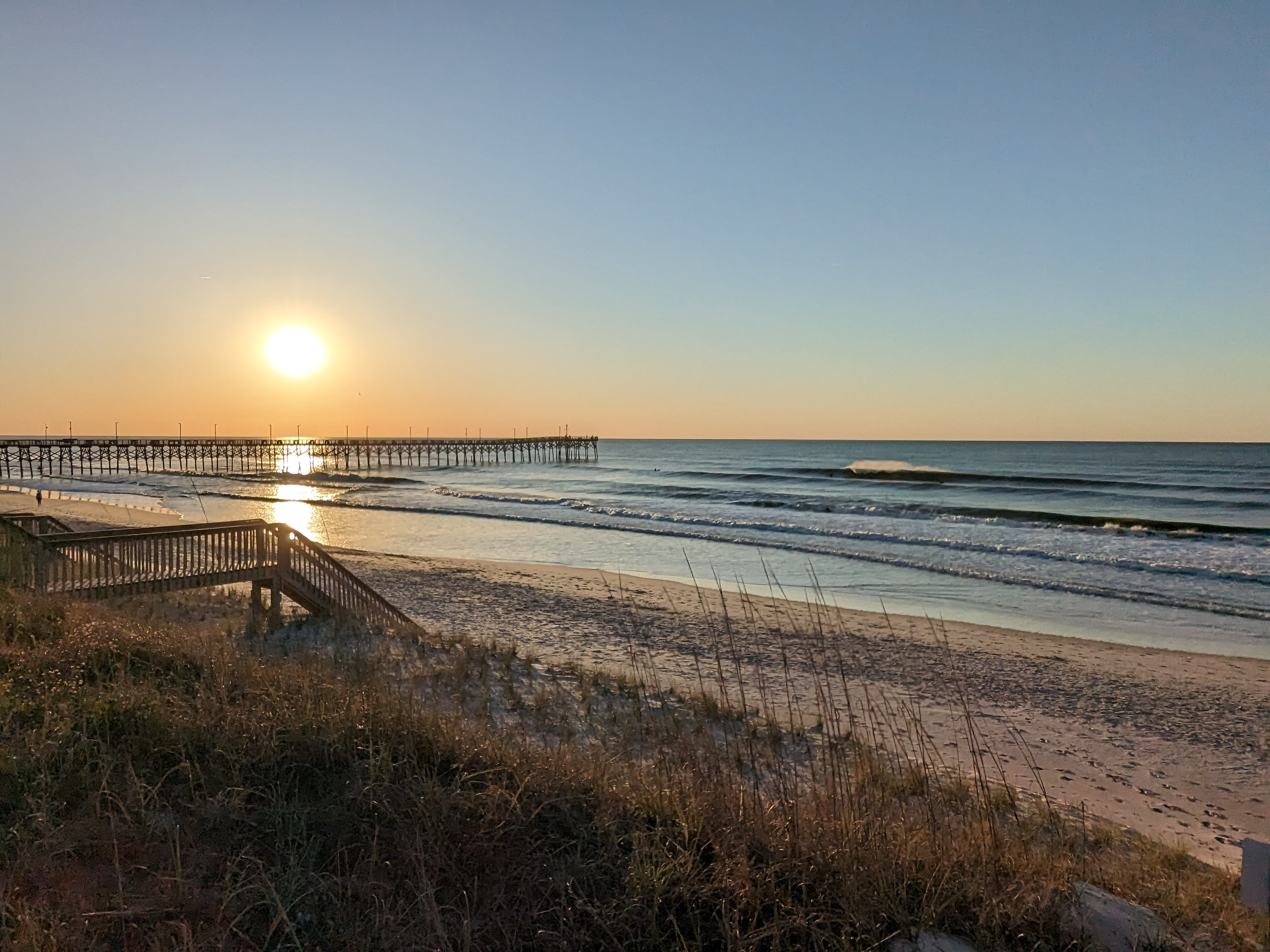
Beach on Topsail Island and the Surf City Pier

It includes the communities of North Topsail Beach, Surf City, and Topsail Beach. Along with its thick maritime forests, Topsail Island is also a sanctuary for sea turtles and is known for its beaches. The island lies in Onslow County in the north and in Pender County in the south. There are only two ways on and off the island: a high-rise bridge in Surf City and a high-rise bridge in North Topsail Beach. It is also known for its varieties of coral and fossils.

== Name origin ==
Topsail Island's name is claimed to have derived from its historical use by pirates: according to popular belief, pirates would lie in wait in the channel between the island and the mainland, hoping to capture passing merchant vessels. As word spread about this tactic, mariners supposedly began referring to "Topsail Island" as a pirate vessel's topsail was often the only visible indicator of a planned ambush.

== History ==
Prior to World War II, Topsail Island was only accessible by boat. Area residents frequently made this short trip and picnicked on the sandy shores of the Atlantic Ocean. Local farmers are said to have driven their livestock across the waterways at low tide to graze on wild beach grass. Treasure hunters searched for Blackbeard's infamous buried treasure throughout the maritime forests which covered the island. During the early 20th century only a few structures, probably less than a dozen, were built along the sound and were used as shelter for fishing trips and summer vacations. At the beginning of World War II, the U.S. Army built a large temporary anti-aircraft training base at Holly Ridge known as Camp Davis and took possession of the island. They built the road from Camp Davis to the sound and installed a pontoon bridge across the Intracoastal Waterway where a swing bridge was later constructed in the 1950s. (The swing bridge was replaced by a fixed-span high rise bridge in 2018). They also erected training facilities and support buildings in what is now the Surf City business district.

Immediately after the war, the US Navy took possession of the island and began a joint project with Johns Hopkins University known as Operation Bumblebee which was an early guided missile development program. Over 200 missiles were test fired. The missile assembly building is located on the sound at Channel Blvd. and Flake Ave. in the Topsail Beach business district which is now used as a museum and meeting center. The launch pad is now used as a patio for the Jolly Roger Motel, and several missile tracking towers still stand along the island. The testing ended in 1948 and the island was returned its original owners. The roads, bridge, and other infrastructure were left intact and development of the island as a beach resort began in the 1950s. A developer built a brick model home for a planned development in 1952. However, in 1954 the storm surge from Hurricane Hazel completely flooded the island, washing away most structures. The model home survived the storm with minor damage, however the design was abandoned in favor of homes built on pilings. The model home still stands at the corner of Scott Ave. and Anderson boulevard in Topsail Beach.

== Sea turtles ==
Sea turtle populations are rapidly decreasing due to the increasing populations of humans and rapid degradation of habitats. Recently, efforts have been made to increase these populations by focusing on one main stage of life, the egg site. These sites can be found along the coastlines of beaches up into the sand dunes. There are four main species that can be found on and around the island which are loggerhead, green, leatherback, and Ridley sea turtles. One species specifically that has been the main theme of protection is the Loggerhead Sea Turtle. This turtle has been the basis for the stationing of the Sea Turtle Rescue and Rehabilitation Center in Topsail Island, North Carolina. Their mission is the protection and watching over of the 26 mile stretch of beach that is Topsail Island. They are committed to the overseeing of hatching of the eggs, caring for sick and injured turtles, and protection over the egg site.

Not only do humans disturb the nesting sites of sea turtles, hurricanes play a large role in this as well. Extreme weather will result in the alteration of the nesting site in a negative way by ruining nesting quality through sand erosion. This will cause the turtles to not choose an area that may normally be a safe choice. Also, a hurricane could drown potential eggs reducing the population of the specific turtle that laid the eggs. Occasionally the number of offspring affected will be negligible due to the actual number of eggs being laid at the time of the storm. Loggerhead and green turtles are threatened, while Kemp's Ridley, leatherback, and hawksbill are endangered under the Endangered Species Act and are under joint jurisdiction under the NOAA Fisheries and the U.S. Fish and Wildlife Service.

== Operation Bumblebee ==
At the end of World War II the Navy took possession of Topsail Island and began a joint venture with Johns Hopkins University and established the US Naval Ordnance Test Facilities at Topsail Island, North Carolina, for Operation Bumblebee, a top-secret, experimental project to develop and test ramjet missiles, which advanced the Nation's jet aircraft and missile programs. So successful were the tests conducted at the Topsail Island site that the ramjet proved its value, opened the way for the advance of supersonic jet aircraft design, and brought the United States to the threshold of modern space technology with the Talos, Terrier, Tartar, and Sea Sparrow missiles aboard naval vessels. The name 'Bumblebee' was chosen, possibly due to the misconception that it is aerodynamically unable to fly, but does not know this and flies anyway. This operation led to the maturing of supersonic aircraft and shipboard missile design in the mid-20th century.

With the emergence of Operation Bumblebee it brought about the dredging of the waterway, new buildings of roads, and fresh water being piped into the island.

Topsail Island was the third of three widespread test sites established along the Atlantic seaboard in the closing years of World War II, and the first permanent ground for missile testing. The Topsail Island site, placed in operation in March 1947, incorporated rigid structures that were designed and built for specific uses related to the assembly, firing, monitoring, and perfecting of experimental ramjet missiles. The buildings associated with this testing, the Assembly Building, Facility Control Tower, and Observation Tower No. 2 possess exceptional importance because they are the only above ground resources remaining at these three sites where the Nation's burgeoning ramjet missile program grew from experimentation to maturity. The Assembly Building is a one-and-a-half-story masonry building and the Control Tower is a three-story reinforced concrete building. Observation Tower #2 is an unaltered example of the eight instrument towers erected on Topsail Island. Towers #1, #4, #5, and #7 were converted into houses. Tower #3 was also converted into a house, but the addition was destroyed by Hurricane Fran in 1996. Tower #6 was converted into a restaurant and fishing pier, but the pier was also destroyed by Fran, and the addition was demolished later. Tower #8 is the only tower that no longer stands, having been demolished in 1989. The concrete launch pad serves as the patio of the Jolly Roger Motel in Topsail Beach.

Naval and Marine personnel, numbering 500 men, and led by Lieutenant Commander Tad Stanwick, arrived at the site by mid-1946 to begin installation of the facilities needed for the testing. During the next 18 months, an estimated 200 experimental rockets, each measuring six inches in diameter and between three and 13 feet in length, were fabricated at the Assembly Building, dispatched to the launch site, and fired along a northeasterly angular deflection of 15 degrees to the shoreline for a maximum clear distance of 40 miles. Despite the initial success of the US Naval Ordnance Testing facility at Topsail Island over its 18-month span, its location did not fulfill completely the needs of a permanent base because weather conditions and increased sea traffic interfered with testing, and the facility was abandoned and its equipment moved to other sites.

== Transportation ==
Two state highways run along the island and meet in Surf City, which is approximately the geographic center of the island. These are:

- NC 50: From the Surf City Bridge southwards to terminate at the southern tip of the island in Topsail Beach
- NC 210: From the Surf City Bridge northwards to North Topsail Beach, then across the North Topsail Bridge

== Gallery ==
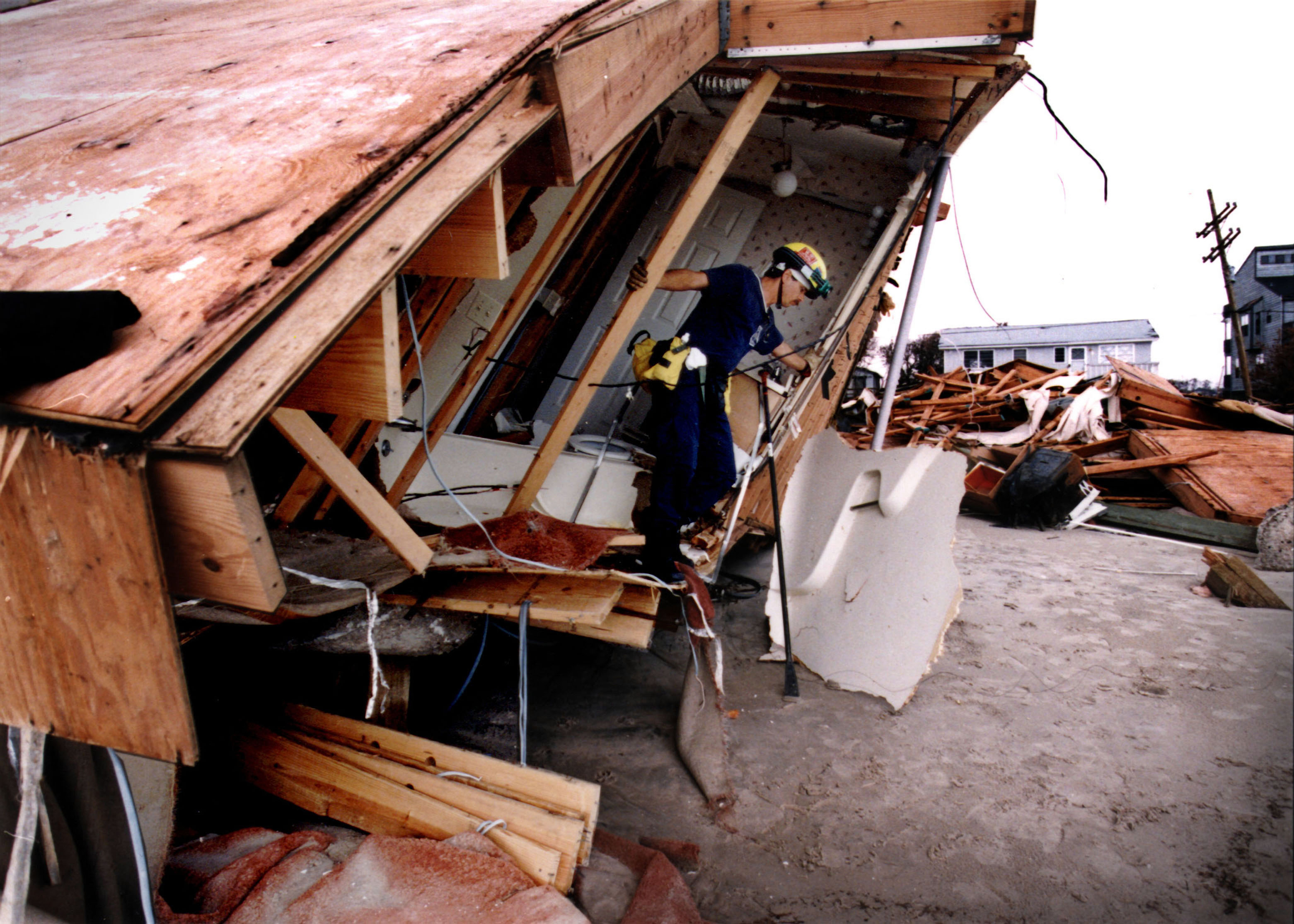
North Topsail Beach, September 6, 1996 — An Urban Search and Rescue (USAR) Team inspects damaged and destroyed homes for reportedly missing people in the aftermath of Hurricane Fran

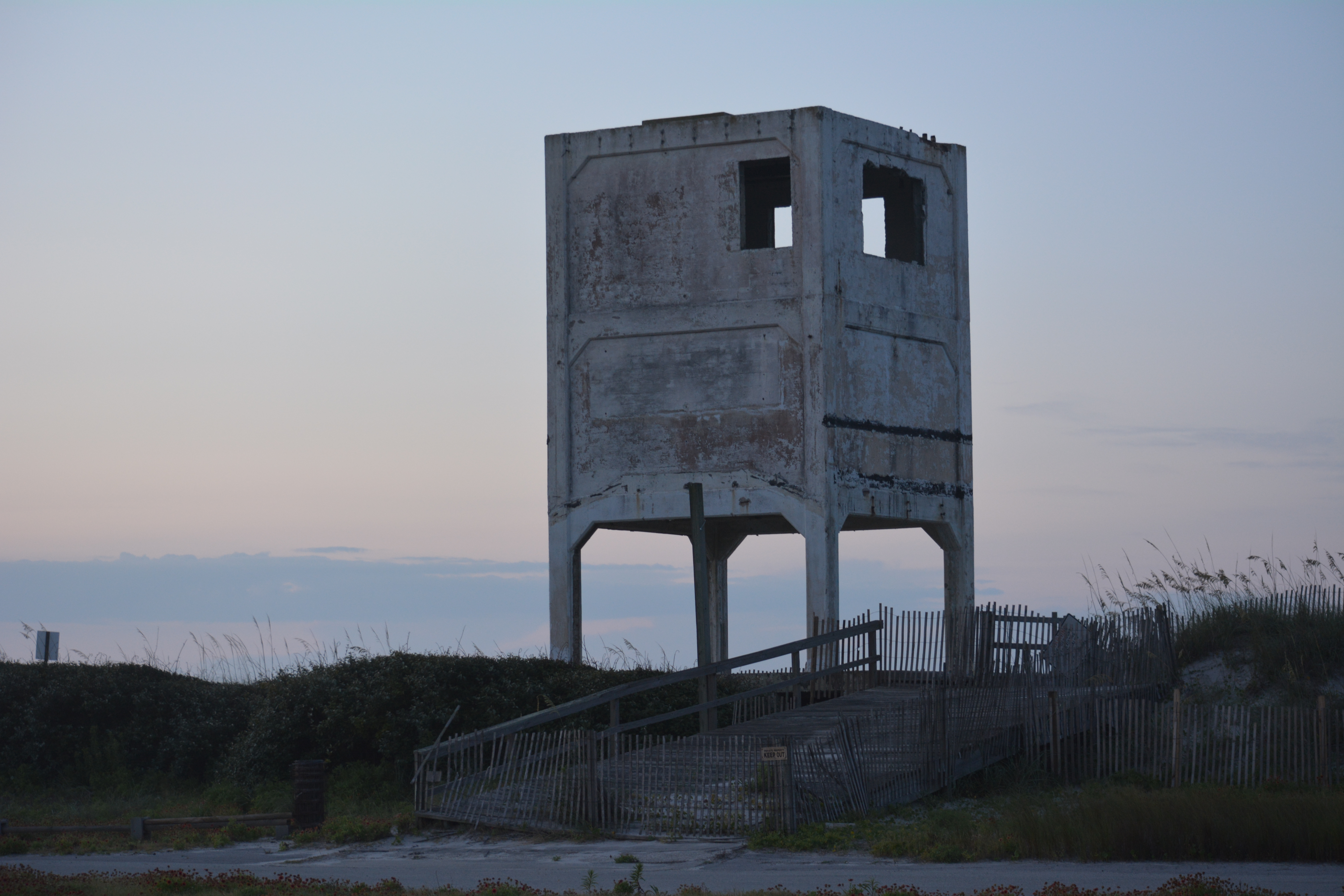
Observation tower on Topsail Island left over from Operation Bumblebee

== See also ==
- Karen Beasley Sea Turtle Center
