= Surf City, North Carolina =

- Town
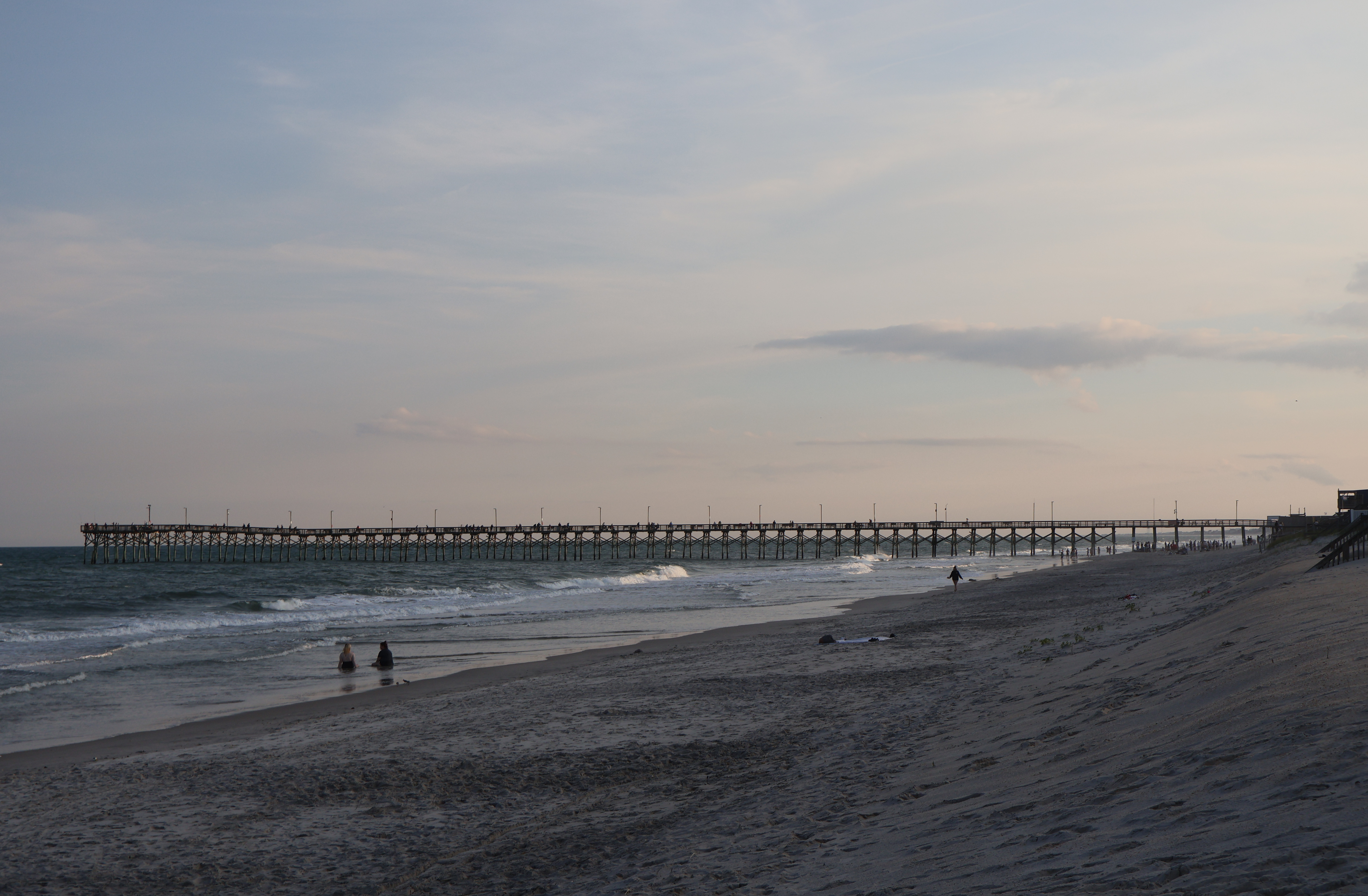
- Surf City Ocean Pier

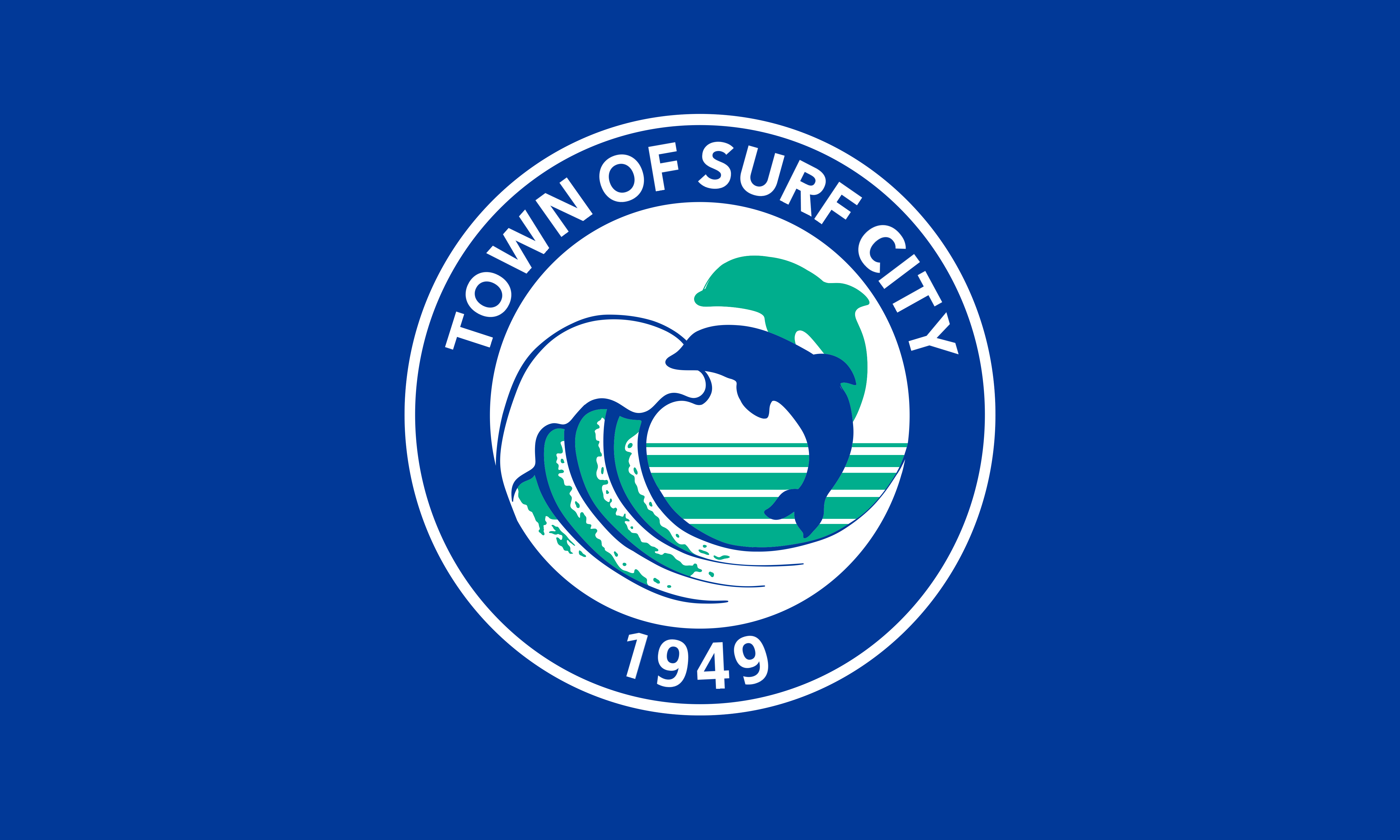
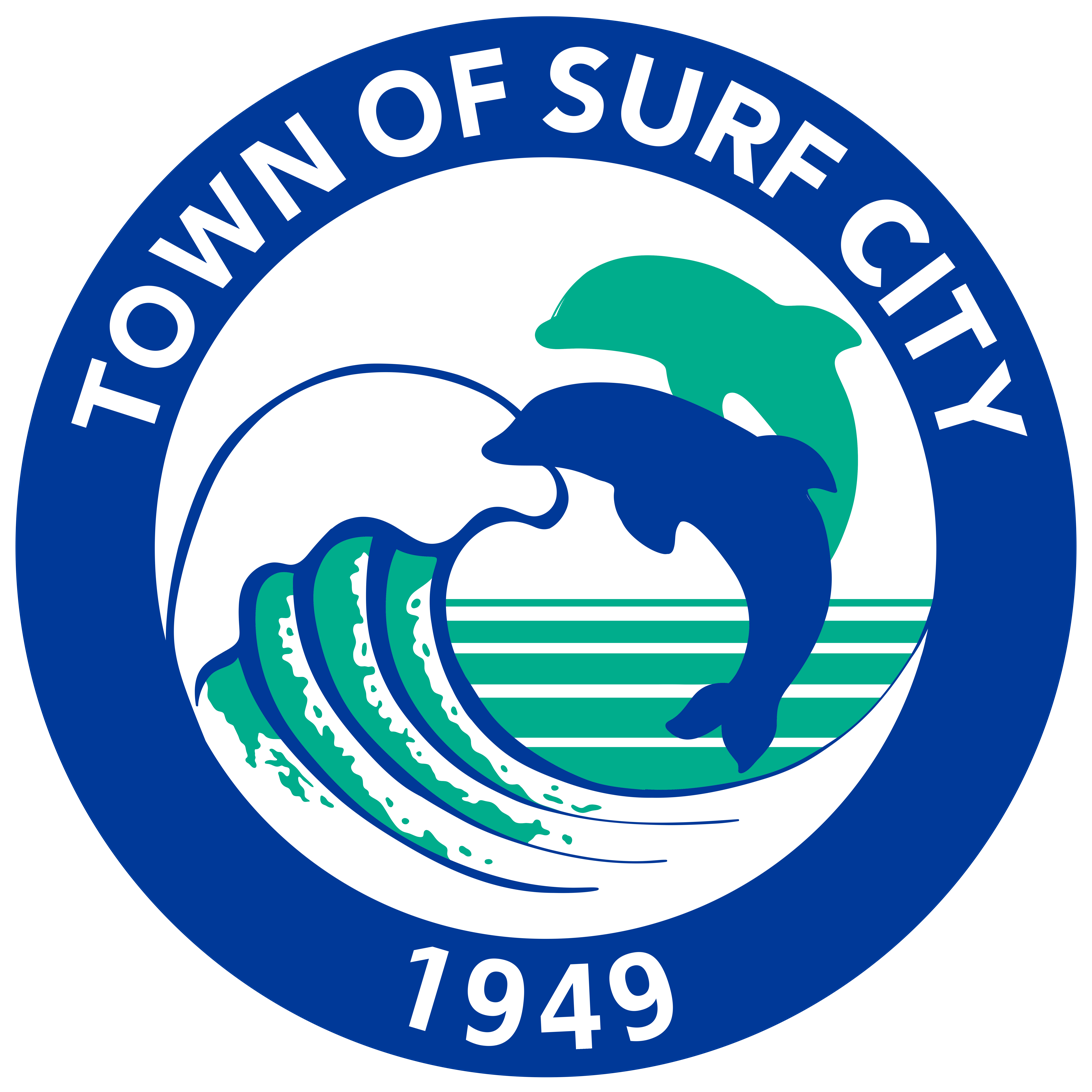
- Flag Seal
- Motto: "Big enough to be competitive, small enough to be happy!"
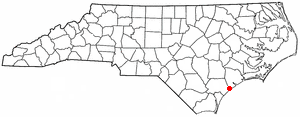
- Coordinates: 34°25′44″N 77°33′26″W
- Country: United States
- State: North Carolina
- Counties: Pender, Onslow
- Incorporated (town): 1949

Government
  - Type: Municipality
  - Mayor: Teresa B. Batts
  - Council: List of Councilmen: Teresa B. Batts; Donald R. Helms; William J. "Buddy" Fowler; Jeremy Shugarts; John Koloski

Area
  - Total: 9.88 sq mi (25.60 km^{2})
  - Land: 7.61 sq mi (19.70 km^{2})
  - Water: 2.28 sq mi (5.90 km^{2}) 20.4%
- Elevation: 0 ft (0 m)

Population (2020)
  - Total: 3,867
  - Density: 508.5/sq mi (196.33/km^{2})
- Time zone: UTC-5 (EST)
  - Summer (DST): UTC-4 (EDT)
- ZIP code: 28445 & 28443
- Area codes: 910, 472
- FIPS code: 37-66040
- GNIS feature ID: 2406694
- Website: www.surfcitync.gov

Surf City is a town in Onslow and Pender counties in the U.S. state of North Carolina. The population was 3,867 at the 2020 census. It is located on Topsail Island.

The Pender County portion of Surf City is part of the Wilmington, NC Metropolitan Statistical Area, while the Onslow County portion is part of the Jacksonville, NC Metropolitan Statistical Area.

== Geography ==
According to the United States Census Bureau, Surf City has a total area of 5.3 square miles (13.7 km^{2}), of which 4.2 square miles (10.9 km^{2}) is land and 1.1 square miles (2.8 km^{2}) (20.45%) is water.

== Climate ==
Climate data for SURF CITY, NC, 1991-2020 normals
Month	Jan	Feb	Mar	Apr	May	Jun	Jul	Aug	Sep	Oct	Nov	Dec	Year
Mean daily maximum °F (°C)	54.8 (12.7)	56.7 (13.7)	63.3 (17.4)	71.6 (22.0)	78.3 (25.7)	84.2 (29.0)	87.5 (30.8)	86.7 (30.4)	82.1 (27.8)	74.4 (23.6)	65.8 (18.8)	58.6 (14.8)	72.0 (22.2)
Daily mean °F (°C)	44.2 (6.8)	46.2 (7.9)	51.7 (10.9)	60.9 (16.1)	68.7 (20.4)	75.9 (24.4)	79.5 (26.4)	78.5 (25.8)	73.7 (23.2)	64.1 (17.8)	54.5 (12.5)	47.3 (8.5)	62.1 (16.7)
Mean daily minimum °F (°C)	33.7 (0.9)	35.7 (2.1)	40.2 (4.6)	50.3 (10.2)	59.1 (15.1)	67.5 (19.7)	71.5 (21.9)	70.3 (21.3)	65.2 (18.4)	53.8 (12.1)	43.2 (6.2)	36.0 (2.2)	52.2 (11.2)
Average precipitation inches (mm)	0.00 (0.00)	0.00 (0.00)	0.00 (0.00)	0.00 (0.00)	0.00 (0.00)	0.00 (0.00)	0.00 (0.00)	0.00 (0.00)	0.00 (0.00)	0.00 (0.00)	0.00 (0.00)	0.00 (0.00)	0.00 (0.00)
Average precipitation days (≥ 0.01 in)	0.0	0.0	0.0	0.0	0.0	0.0	0.0	0.0	0.0	0.0	0.0	0.0	0.0
Source: NOAA

== Demographics ==
Historical population
Census	Pop.	Note	%±
1970	166		—
1980	421		153.6%
1990	970		130.4%
2000	1,393		43.6%
2010	1,853		33.0%
2020	3,867		108.7%
U.S. Decennial Census

=== 2020 census ===
Surf City racial composition
Race	Number	Percentage
White (non-Hispanic)	3,337	86.29%
Black or African American (non-Hispanic)	42	1.09%
Native American	8	0.21%
Asian	46	1.19%
Pacific Islander	2	0.05%
Other/Mixed	221	5.72%
Hispanic or Latino	211	5.46%

As of the 2020 census, Surf City had a population of 3,867. The median age was 41.8 years. 23.0% of residents were under the age of 18 and 18.5% were 65 years of age or older. For every 100 females, there were 97.6 males, and for every 100 females age 18 and over there were 94.9 males.

89.1% of residents lived in urban areas, while 10.9% lived in rural areas.

There were 1,531 households in Surf City, including 870 families. Of all households, 32.1% had children under the age of 18 living in them, 59.5% were married-couple households, 14.2% were households with a male householder and no spouse or partner present, and 20.6% were households with a female householder and no spouse or partner present. About 22.2% of all households were made up of individuals, and 10.3% had someone living alone who was 65 years of age or older.

There were 4,145 housing units, of which 63.1% were vacant. The homeowner vacancy rate was 2.1% and the rental vacancy rate was 35.8%.

=== 2000 census ===
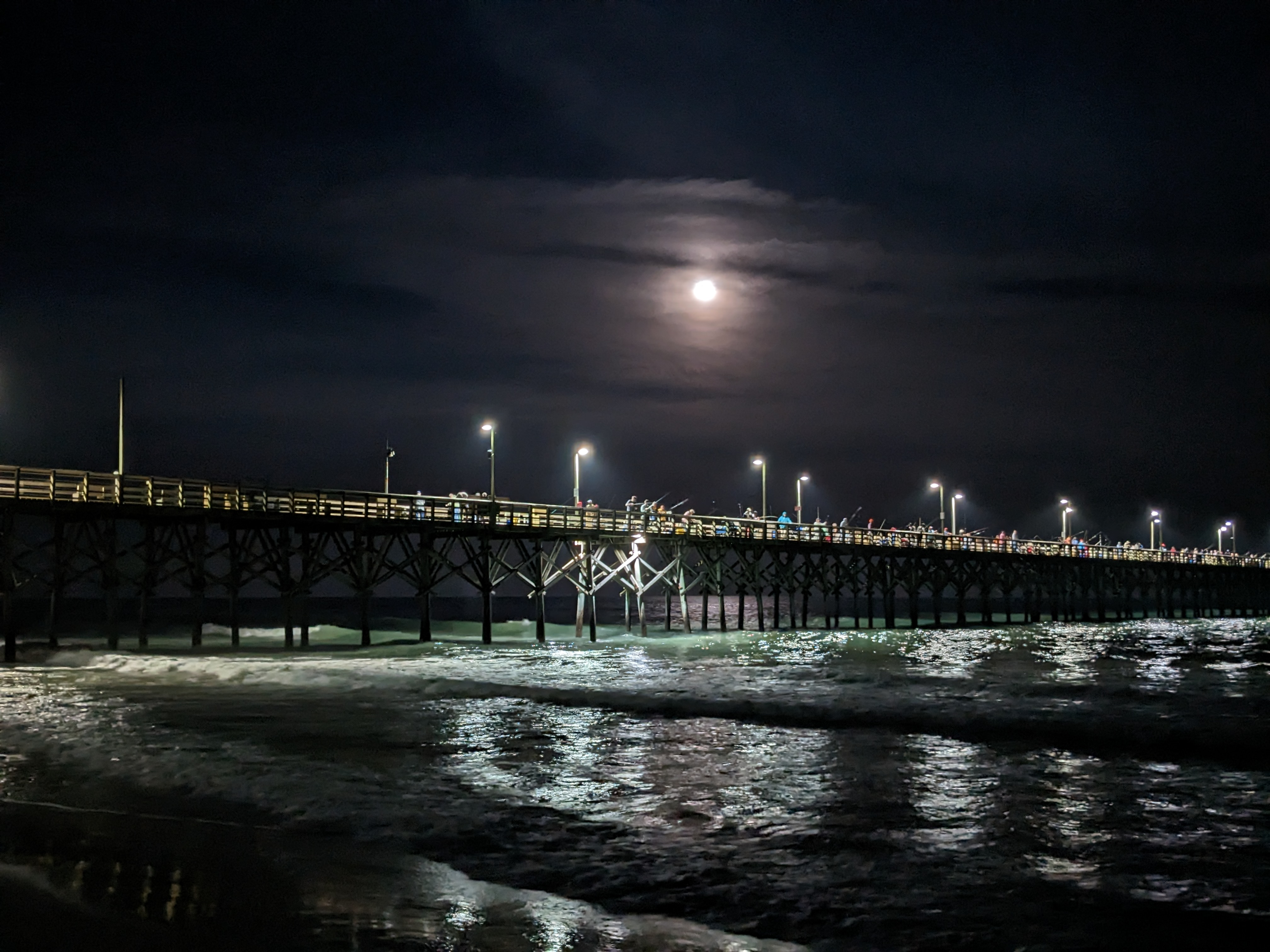
Surf City Pier, with people fishing at night

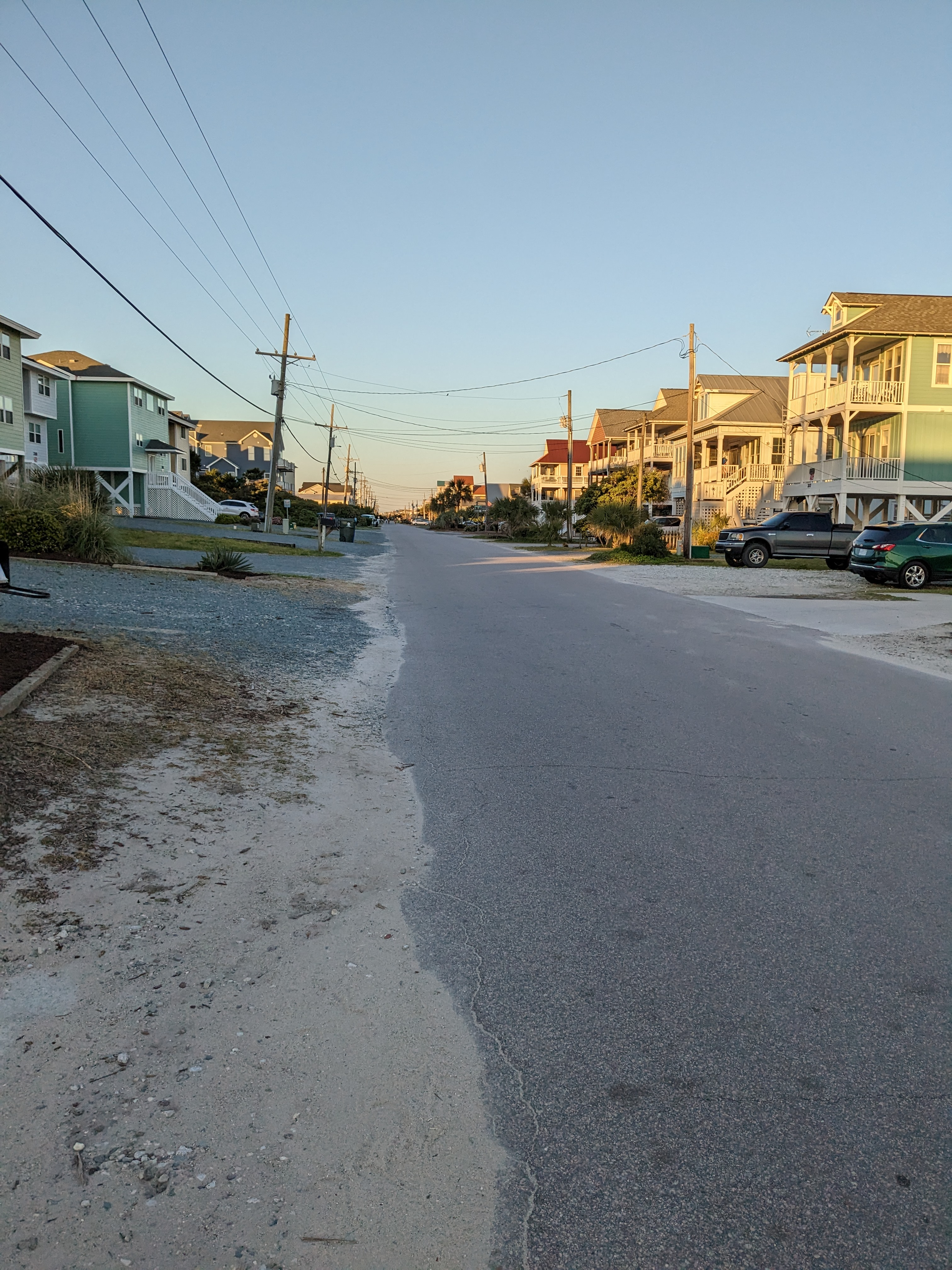
Houses in Surf City

As of the census of 2000 there were 1,393 people, 689 households, and 403 families residing in the town. The population density was 331.6 inhabitants per square mile (128.0/km^{2}). There were 2,578 housing units at an average density of 613.7 per square mile (237.0/km^{2}). The racial makeup of the town was 97.77% White, 0.43% African American, 0.07% Native American, 0.72% Asian, 0.14% Pacific Islander, 0.22% from other races, and 0.65% from two or more races. Hispanic or Latino of any race were 1.01% of the population.

There were 689 households, out of which 12.6% had children under the age of 18 living with them, 51.5% were married couples living together, 4.9% had a female householder with no husband present, and 41.4% were non-families. 32.4% of all households were made up of individuals, and 7.7% had someone living alone who was 65 years of age or older. The average household size was 2.02 and the average family size was 2.51.

In the town, the population was spread out, with 12.6% under the age of 18, 6.2% from 18 to 24, 25.4% from 25 to 44, 39.6% from 45 to 64, and 16.3% who were 65 years of age or older. The median age was 48 years. For every 100 females, there were 102.2 males. For every 100 females age 18 and over, there were 104.7 males.

The median income for a household in the town was $40,521, and the median income for a family was $48,854. Males had a median income of $36,600 versus $30,000 for females. The per capita income for the town was $25,242. About 9.9% of families and 15.4% of the population were below the poverty line, including 43.3% of those under age 18 and 3.9% of those age 65 or over.

== Bridges ==
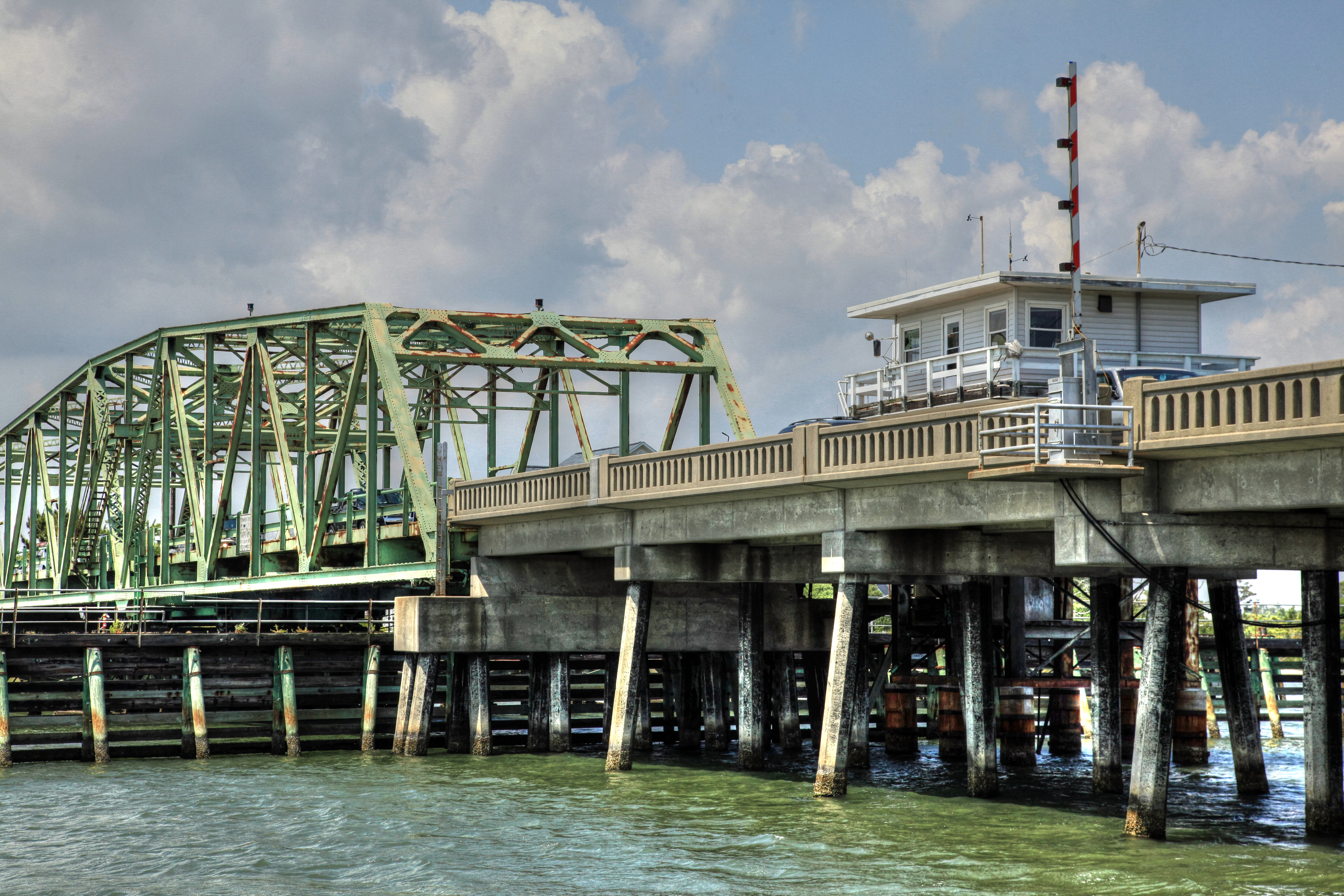
The old swing bridge was replaced in December 2018

Until late 2018, road access to Surf City was mainly via the Topsail Island Swing Bridge, a failing steel truss swing-span bridge, built in 1954, which crossed the Intracoastal Waterway. Planning for a replacement bridge began in 2010, with construction beginning in September 2016. It opened in December 2018, a year ahead of schedule. Costing US$54 million, the 3,800 feet (1,200 m) fixed-span high rise bridge, with a vertical clearance of 65 feet (20 m), allows the passage of vessels at any time and eases traffic flow to and from the community. The 50 feet (15 m) wide bridge provides two lanes for traffic, shoulder bicycle lanes, and a multi-use path. The unusually wide design is intended to permit three lanes for hurricane evacuations. The contractor was scheduled to remove the old bridge by March 31, 2019. In a letter to residents in January, the Town's mayor, Doug Medlin said, "NCDOT and Balfour Beatty understood the sentimental relationship that the Town of Surf City had for our Swing Bridge. We were given the turn bridge control panel and key as well as the cornerstone from when the bridge was first constructed. These items will be displayed in the new Surf City Town Hall as a historical memorial."

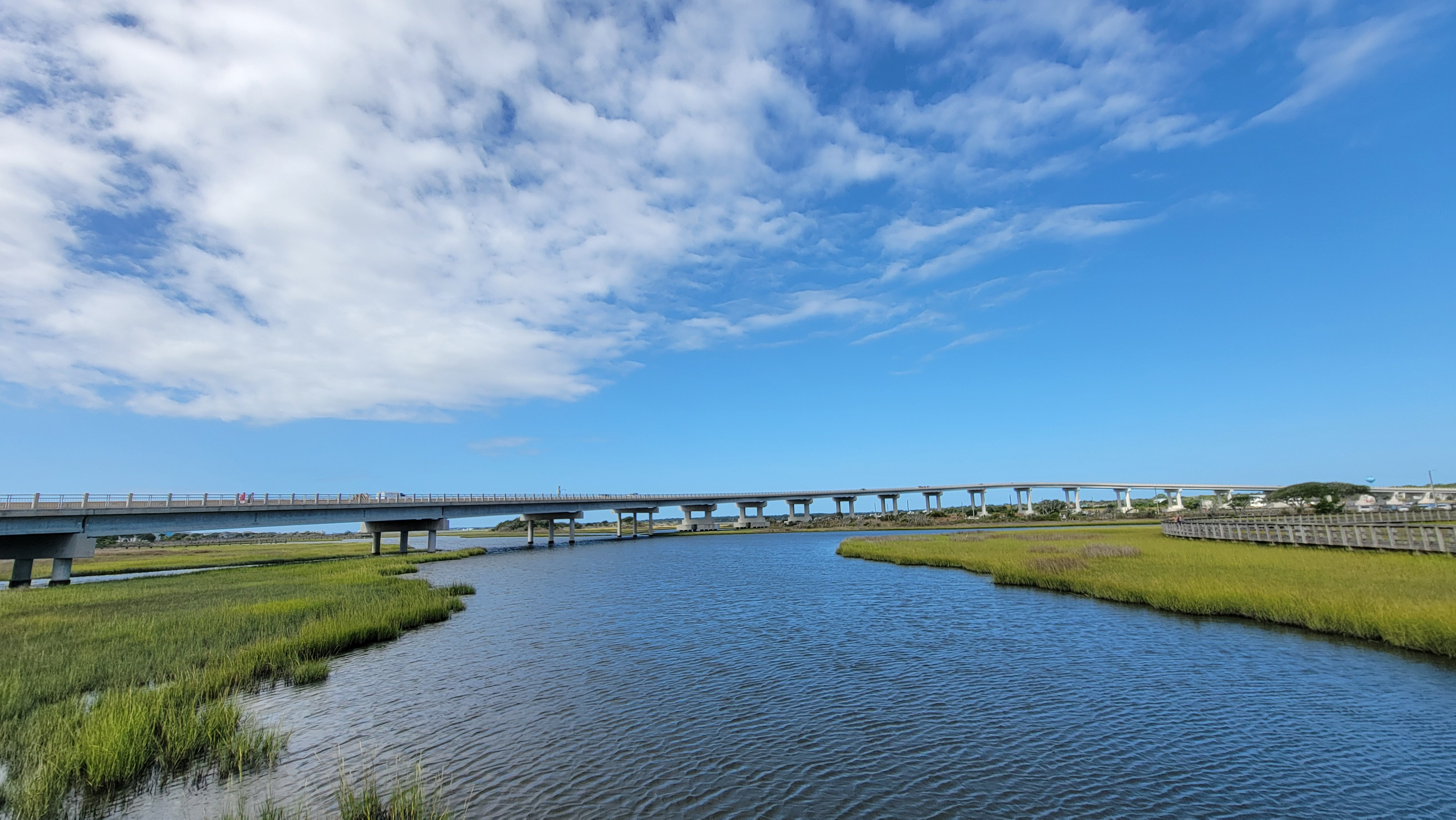
Surf City NC High Rise Bridge, as seen from the Soundside Park

Preceded by North Topsail Beach	Beaches of Southeastern North Carolina	Succeeded by Topsail Beach
