= North Topsail Beach, North Carolina =

North Topsail, North Carolina
- Town
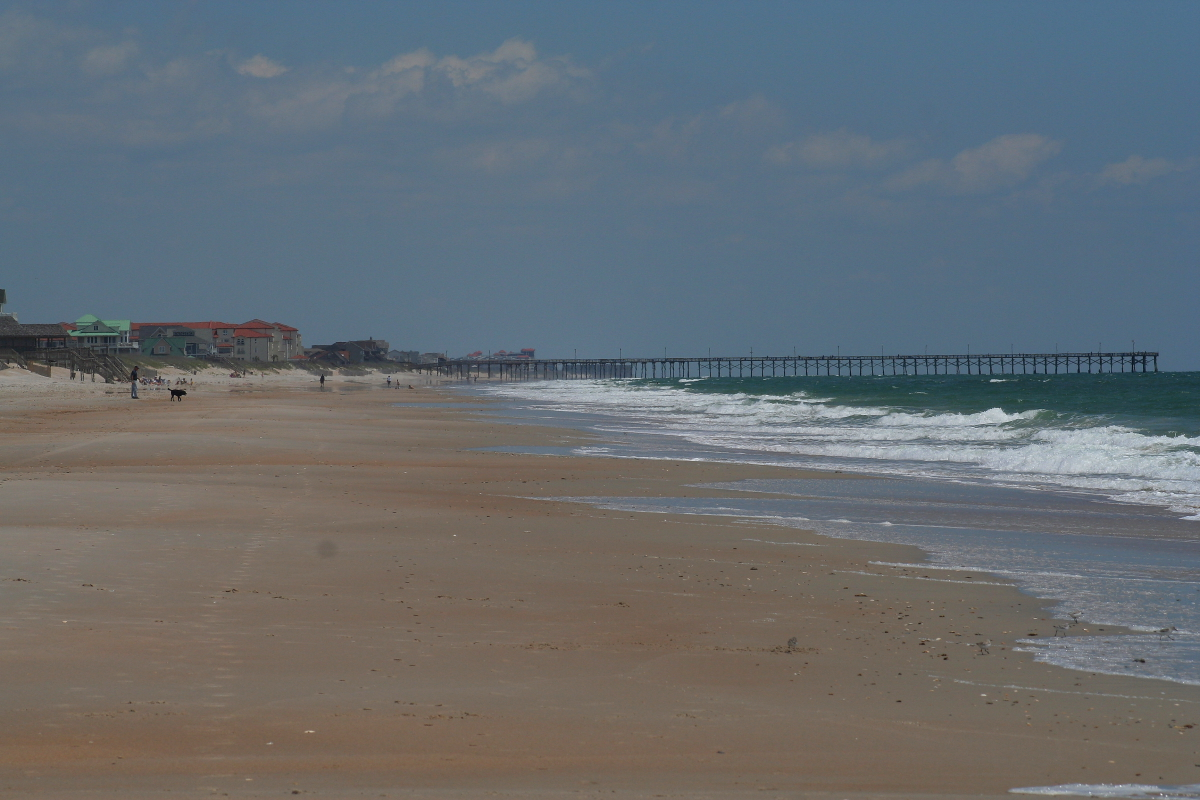
- North Topsail Beach coastline
- Motto: Nature's Tranquil Beauty
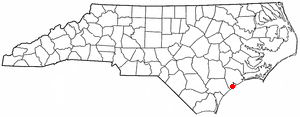
- Location of North Topsail Beach, North Carolina
- Coordinates: 34°29′36″N 77°26′00″W
- Country: United States
- State: North Carolina
- County: Onslow

Government
  - Mayor: Rick Grant
  - Town Manager: Stephanie C. Dollinger

Area
  - Total: 10.37 sq mi (26.86 km^{2})
  - Land: 6.22 sq mi (16.10 km^{2})
  - Water: 4.15 sq mi (10.75 km^{2})
- Elevation: 3 ft (0.91 m)

Population (2020)
  - Total: 1,005
  - Density: 162/sq mi (62.4/km^{2})
- Time zone: UTC-5 (Eastern (EST))
  - Summer (DST): UTC-4 (EDT)
- ZIP code: 28460
- Area codes: 910, 472
- FIPS code: 37-47845
- GNIS feature ID: 2407008
- Website: northtopsailbeachnc.gov

North Topsail Beach is a town in Onslow County, North Carolina, United States. The population was 1,005 at the 2020 census. It is located on Topsail Island. North Topsail Beach is part of the Jacksonville, North Carolina Metropolitan Statistical Area.

== History ==
In the 1940s, Ocean City was the one place in the area where African Americans could vacation or buy property. The idea came from white attorney Edgar L. Yow, who owned land in the area and talked to Black physician Samuel Gray. Wade H. Chestnut, who along with wife Caronell owned the first home there, was a leader in the community's development. In July 2022, a historical marker was planned, which will be part of the state's Civil Rights Trail.

== Geography ==
According to the United States Census Bureau, the town has a total area of 10.6 square miles (27 km^{2}), of which 6.4 square miles (17 km^{2}) is land and 4.2 square miles (11 km^{2}) (39.32%) is water.

== Demographics ==
Historical population
Census	Pop.	Note	%±
2000	843		—
2010	743		−11.9%
2020	1,005		35.3%
U.S. Decennial Census

=== 2020 census ===
North Topsail Beach racial composition
Race	Number	Percentage
White (non-Hispanic)	913	90.85%
Black or African American (non-Hispanic)	12	1.19%
Native American	5	0.5%
Asian	2	0.2%
Other/Mixed	32	3.18%
Hispanic or Latino	41	4.08%

As of the 2020 United States census, there were 1,005 people, 482 households, and 233 families residing in the town.

=== 2000 census ===
As of the census of 2000, there were 843 people, 451 households, and 242 families residing in the city. The population density was 131.4 inhabitants per square mile (50.7/km^{2}). There were 2,085 housing units at an average density of 324.9 per square mile (125.4/km^{2}). The racial makeup of the city was 92.17% White, 4.74% African American, 0.47% Native American, 0.83% Asian, 0.47% from other races, and 1.30% from two or more races. Hispanic or Latino of any race were 0.83% of the population.

There were 451 households, out of which 9.5% had children under the age of 18 living with them, 47.7% were married couples living together, 4.2% had a female householder with no husband present, and 46.3% were non-families. 37.9% of all households were made up of individuals, and 9.3% had someone living alone who was 65 years of age or older. The average household size was 1.87 and the average family size was 2.37.

In the city the population was spread out, with 9.4% under the age of 18, 9.7% from 18 to 24, 30.7% from 25 to 44, 33.1% from 45 to 64, and 17.1% who were 65 years of age or older. The median age was 45 years. For every 100 females, there were 109.2 males. For every 100 females age 18 and over, there were 114.0 males.

The median income for a household in the city was $45,982, and the median income for a family was $53,125. Males had a median income of $36,522 versus $30,000 for females. The per capita income for the city was $33,972. About 5.5% of families and 8.6% of the population were below the poverty line, including 25.0% of those under age 18 and 4.4% of those age 65 or over.

Preceded by Onslow Beach	Beaches of Southeastern North Carolina	Succeeded by Surf City
