= Timeline of the 1996 Pacific hurricane season =

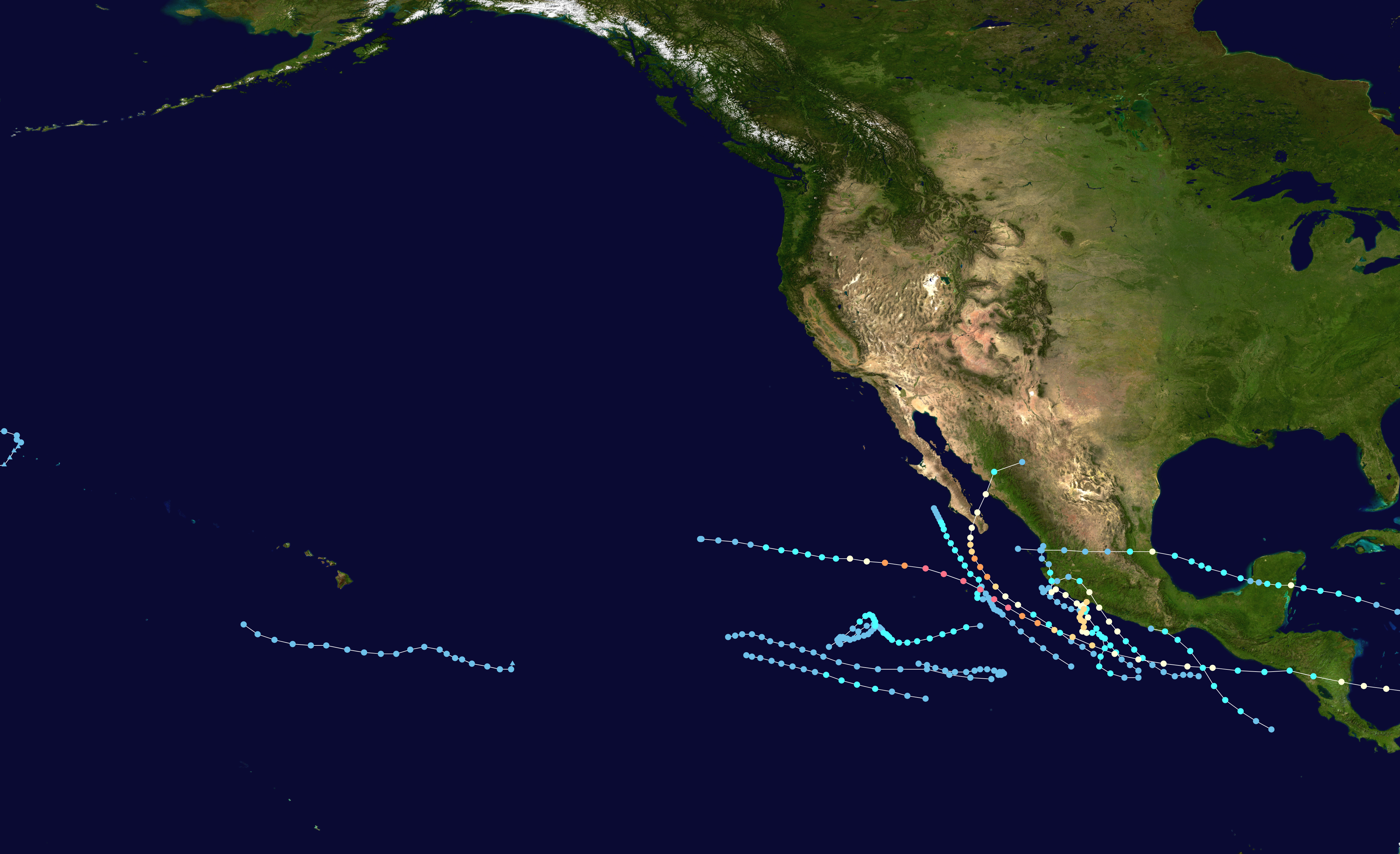
- Season summary map

Season boundaries
- First system formed: May 13, 1996
- Last system dissipated: November 11, 1996

Strongest system
- Name: Douglas
- Maximum winds: 130 mph (215 km/h) (1-minute sustained)
- Lowest pressure: 946 mbar (hPa; 27.94 inHg)

Longest lasting system
- Name: Genevieve
- Duration: 11.25 days
Storm articles
- Hurricane Cesar–Douglas
- Hurricane Dolly (1996)

The 1996 Pacific hurricane season consisted of the events that occurred in the annual cycle of tropical cyclone formation over the Pacific Ocean north of the equator and east of the International Date Line. The official bounds of each Pacific hurricane season are dates that conventionally delineate the period each year during which tropical cyclones tend to form in the basin according to the National Hurricane Center (NHC), beginning on May 15 in the Eastern Pacific proper (east of 140°W) and June 1 in the Central Pacific (140°W to the International Date Line), and ending on November 30 in both areas. However, tropical cyclogenesis is possible at any time of year, as demonstrated by the formation of an unnamed tropical storm two days before the season officially began. Activity during the season was below average; (Note: During the period from 1991 to 2020, an average Pacific hurricane season generated fifteen tropical storms, eight hurricanes, and four major hurricanes.) fifteen tropical depressions developed, of which only nine strengthened into named tropical storms. Five became hurricanes, of which two further intensified into major hurricanes. (Note: A major hurricane is a Pacific or Atlantic hurricane that reaches Category 3 or higher on the five-level Saffir–Simpson scale, with maximum sustained winds of at least 111 mph (179 km/h).) The number of tropical storms were below average; the number of hurricanes were below average, and the number of major hurricanes was half the average of four. Two tropical depressions existed in the Central Pacific in 1996: Tropical Depression Seventeen-W crossed over from the Northwest Pacific, while Tropical Depression One-C formed in the Central Pacific. Activity during the season ceased with the dissipation of Tropical Depression Twelve-E on November 11.

Much of the season's activity was clustered near the coast of Southwest Mexico, with four hurricanes and one tropical storm making landfall along it. The most impactful were: Hurricane Alma, which was responsible for 20 deaths; and |Hurricane Fausto, which left behind damage amounting to around $800,000 (1996 USD). Hurricane Douglas was the strongest storm of the season, reaching Category 4 intensity on the Saffir-Simpson Hurricane Scale. Douglas developed in the Caribbean Sea, within the Atlantic Ocean, as Hurricane Cesar, before crossing into the Pacific as a tropical storm. This was the second season on record in which there were two crossovers systens, after 1988 (Debby and Joan).

This timeline documents tropical cyclone formations, strengthening, weakening, landfalls, extratropical transitions, and dissipations during the season. It includes information that was not released during the season, meaning that data from post-storm reviews by the National Hurricane Center and the Central Pacific Hurricane Center, such as a storm that was not initially warned upon, has been included. The time stamp for each event is first stated using Coordinated Universal Time (UTC), the 24-hour clock where 00:00 = midnight UTC. The NHC uses both UTC and the time zone where the center of the tropical cyclone was then located. Prior to 2015, two time zones were utilized in the Eastern Pacific basin: Pacific for the Eastern Pacific, and Hawaii−Aleutian for the Central Pacific. In this timeline, the respective area time is included in parentheses. Additionally, figures for maximum sustained winds and position estimates are rounded to the nearest 5 units (miles, or kilometers), following National Hurricane Center practice. Direct wind observations are rounded to the nearest whole number. Atmospheric pressures are listed to the nearest millibar and nearest hundredth of an inch of mercury.

== Timeline of events ==
=== May ===
May 13

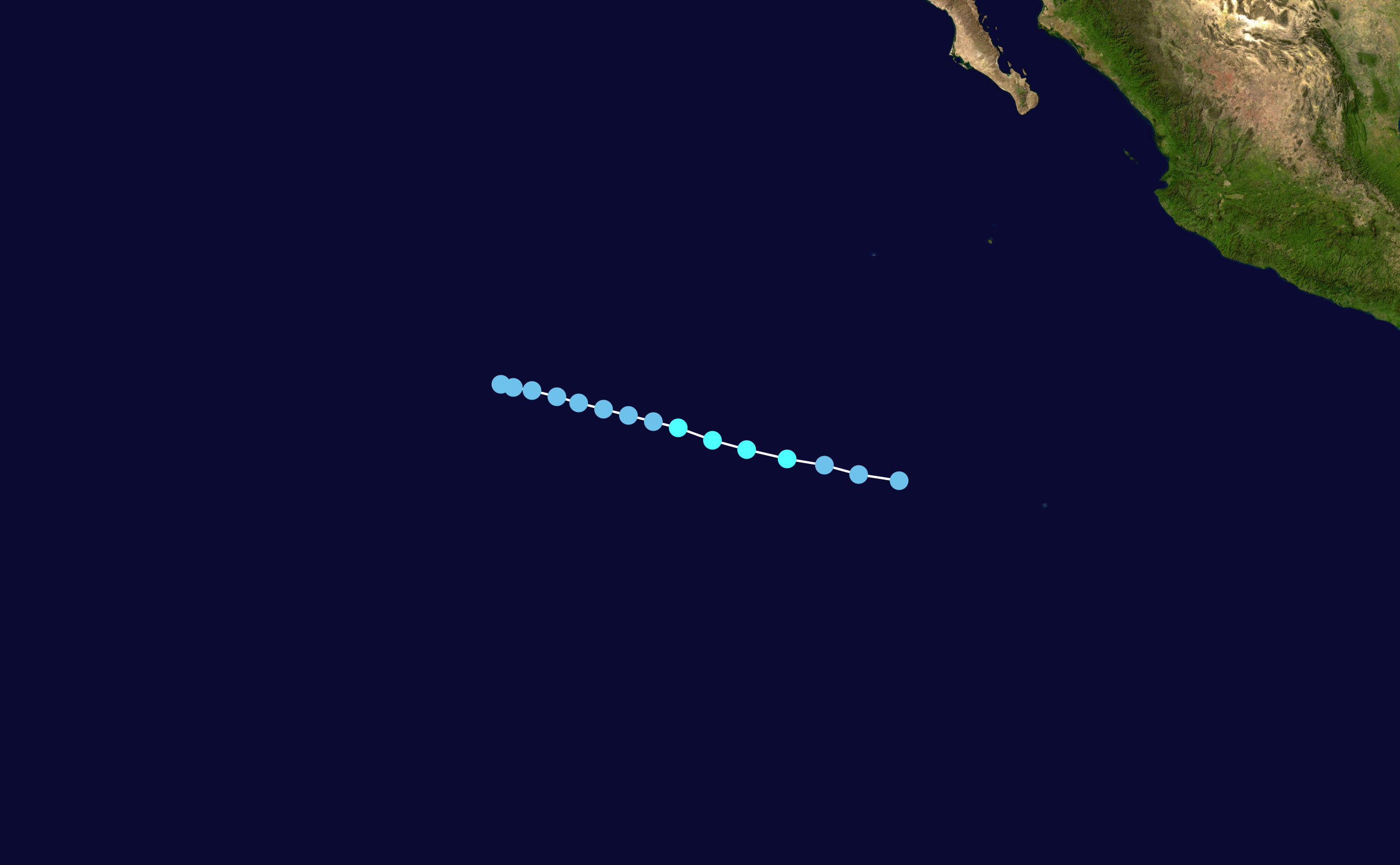
Storm path of the unnamed tropical storm

- 06:00 UTC (11:00 p.m. PDT, May 12) at 11.1°N 113.9°W – Tropical Depression One-E forms from a tropical wave about 800 mi (1,285 km) south-southwest of the southern tip of the Baja California peninsula.

May 14

- 00:00 UTC (5:00 p.m. PDT, May 13) at 11.8°N 117.5°W – Tropical Depression One-E strengthens into an unnamed tropical storm about 910 mi (1,465 km) southwest of the southern tip of the Baja California peninsula. (Note: Operationally, the National Hurricane Center (NHC) assessed One-E to have remained a tropical depression, and so did not assign it a name. Later in the season, the NHC retroactively upgraded the cyclone to a tropical storm.)
- 06:00 UTC (11:00 p.m. PDT, May 13) at 12.1°N 118.8°W – The unnamed tropical storm attains peak sustained winds of 50 mph (85 km/h) and a minimum central pressure of 1000 mbar (29.53 inHg) about 945 mi (1,520 km) southwest of the southern tip of the Baja California peninsula.

May 15

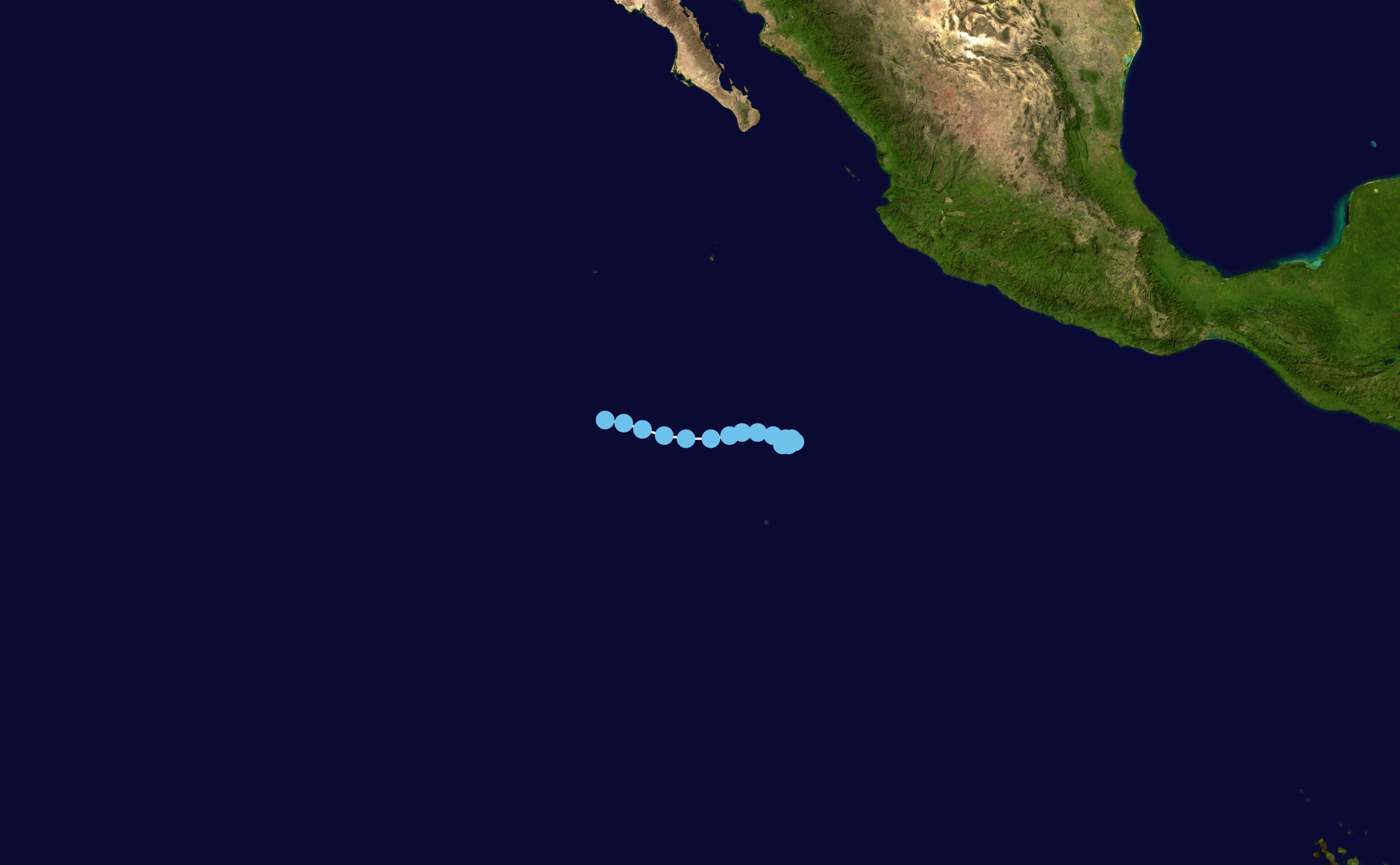
Storm path of Tropical Depression Two-E

- The 1996 Eastern Pacific hurricane season officially begins.
- 00:00 UTC (5:00 p.m. PDT, May 14) at 13.0°N 121.8°W – The unnamed tropical storm weakens into a tropical depression about 1,035 mi (1,665 km) southwest of the southern tip of the Baja California peninsula.
- 12:00 UTC (5:00 a.m. PDT) at 12.8°N 108.7°W – Tropical Depression Two-E forms from an area of unsettled weather about 520 mi (835 km) southwest of Manzanillo, Colima. It simultaneously attains peak sustained winds of 35 mph (55 km/h).
- 18:00 UTC (11:00 a.m. PDT) at 12.8°N 108.5°W – Tropical Depression Two-E attains a minimum central pressure of 1006 mbar (29.71 inHg) about 510 mi (825 km) southwest of Manzanillo.

May 16

- 18:00 UTC (11:00 a.m. PDT) at 14.2°N 126.7°W – The unnamed tropical depression is last noted as a tropical cyclone about 1,250 mi (2,010 km) west-southwest of the southern tip of the Baja California peninsula; it dissipates within six hours.

May 19

- 00:00 UTC (5:00 p.m. PDT, May 18) at 13.6°N 114.4°W – Tropical Depression Two-E is last noted as a tropical cyclone about 765 mi (1,230 km) west-southwest of Manzanillo; it dissipates within six hours.

=== June ===
June 1

- The 1996 Central Pacific hurricane season officially begins.

June 20

- 00:00 UTC (5:00 p.m. PDT, June 19) at 13.1°N 98.7°W – A tropical depression forms from a tropical wave about 410 mi (655 km) southeast of Lázaro Cárdenas, Michoacán.
- 18:00 UTC (11:00 a.m. PDT) at 14.4°N 100.3°W – The recently formed tropical depression strengthens into Tropical Storm Alma about 275 mi (445 km) south-southeast of Lázaro Cárdenas.

June 22

- 00:00 UTC (5:00 p.m. PDT, June 21) at 15.8°N 102.4°W – Tropical Storm Alma strengthens into a Category 1 hurricane about 150 mi (240 km) south of Lázaro Cárdenas.
- 12:00 UTC (5:00 a.m. PDT) at 16.2°N 102.6°W – Hurricane Alma strengthens to Category 2 intensity about 125 mi (205 km) south-southwest of Lázaro Cárdenas.

June 23

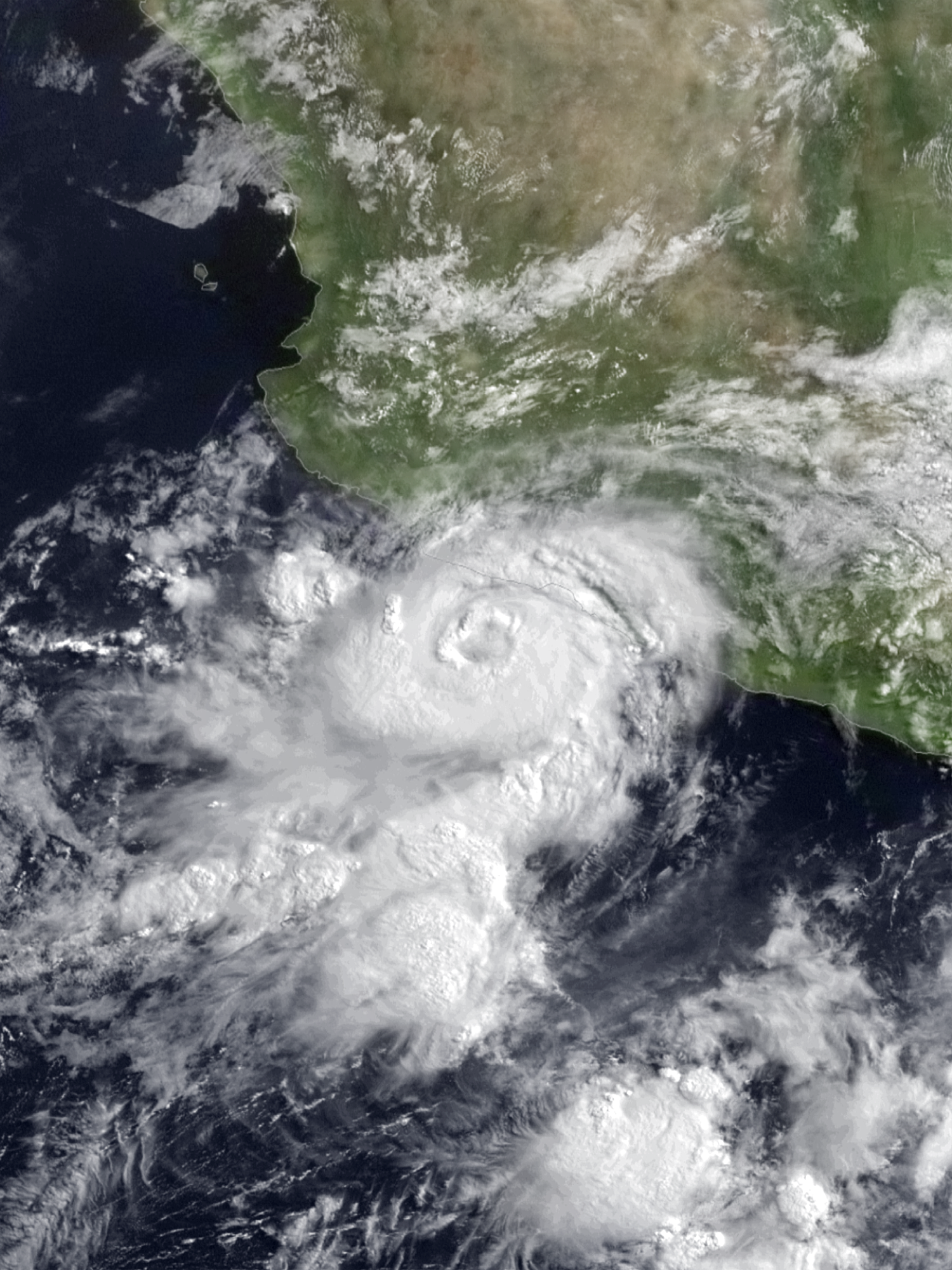
Hurricane Alma at peak intensity shortly before landfall on June 23

- 12:00 UTC (5:00 a.m. PDT) at 17.2°N 102.8°W – Hurricane Alma attains peak winds of 105 mph (165 km/h) and a minimum central pressure of 969 mbar (28.61 inHg) about 65 mi (100 km) southwest of Lázaro Cárdenas.

June 24

- 00:00 UTC (5:00 p.m. PDT, June 23) at 18.0°N 102.4°W – Hurricane Alma makes landfall near Lázaro Cárdenas with sustained winds of 105 mph (165 km/h) and a central pressure of 973 mbar (28.73 inHg).
- 06:00 UTC (11:00 p.m. PDT, June 23) at 17.8°N 102.6°W – Hurricane Alma weakens to Category 1 intensity off shore, about 30 mi (45 km) west-southwest of Lázaro Cárdenas.
- 18:00 UTC (11:00 a.m. PDT) at 17.7°N 102.8°W – Hurricane Alma weakens into a tropical storm about 45 mi (75 km) west-southwest of Lázaro Cárdenas.

June 25

- 18:00 UTC (11:00 a.m. PDT) at 17.3°N 102.7°W – Tropical Storm Alma weakens into a tropical depression about 60 mi (95 km) southwest of Lázaro Cárdenas.

June 27

- 00:00 UTC (5:00 p.m. PDT, June 26) at 12.7°N 94.4°W – A tropical depression forms from a tropical wave about 465 mi (750 km) southeast of Acapulco, Guerrero.
- 12:00 UTC (5:00 a.m. PDT) at 18.9°N 106.2°W – Tropical Depression Alma dissipates about 270 mi (435 km) west-northwest of Lázaro Cárdenas.

June 28

- 12:00 UTC (5:00 a.m. PDT) at 14.0°N 98.4°W – The recently formed tropical depression strengthens into Tropical Storm Boris about 220 mi (350 km) south-southeast of Acapulco.

June 29

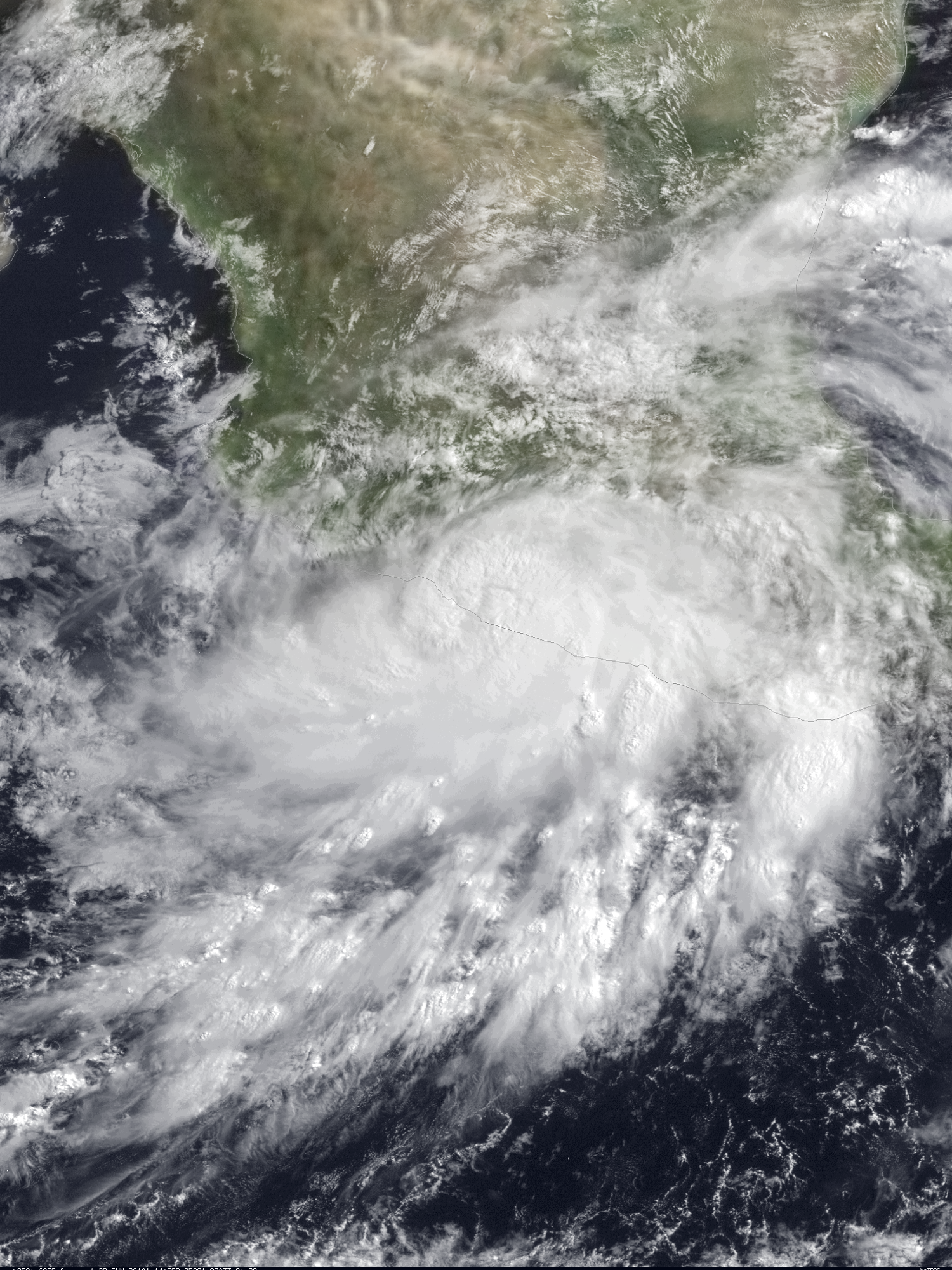
Hurricane Boris shortly before landfall on June 29

- 06:00 TC (11:00 p.m. PDT, June 29) at 15.9°N 100.2°W – Tropical Storm Boris strengthens into a Category 1 hurricane about 70 mi (110 km) south-southwest of Acapulco.
- 12:00 UTC (5:00 a.m. PDT) at 16.6°N 100.8°W – Hurricane Boris attains peak sustained winds of 90 mph (150 km/h) and a minimum central pressure of 979 mbar (28.91 inHg) about 65 mi (100 km) west-southwest of Acapulco.
- 18:00 UTC (11:00 a.m. PDT) at 17.6°N 101.5°W – Hurricane Boris makes landfall about halfway between Acapulco and Lázaro Cárdenas with sustained winds of 90 mph (150 km/h) and a central pressure of 980 mbar (28.94 inHg).

June 30

- 06:00 UTC (11:00 p.m. PDT, June 29) at 19.5°N 102.9°W – Hurricane Boris weakens into a tropical storm inland, about 115 mi (185 km) north-northwest of Lázaro Cárdenas.
- 12:00 UTC (5:00 a.m. PDT) at 19.8°N 103.7°W – Tropical Storm Boris weakens into a tropical depression inland, about 160 mi (260 km) northwest of Lázaro Cárdenas.

=== July ===
July 1

- 12:00 UTC (5:00 a.m. PDT) at 19.0°N 105.6°W – Tropical Depression Boris, after moving off shore, is last noted as a tropical cyclone about 115 mi (185 km) south of Puerto Vallarta, Jalisco; it dissipates within six hours.
- 12:00 UTC (5:00 a.m. PDT) at 8.9°N 89.2°W – A tropical depression forms from an area of unsettled weather about 335 mi (535 km) south of San Salvador, El Salvador.

July 2

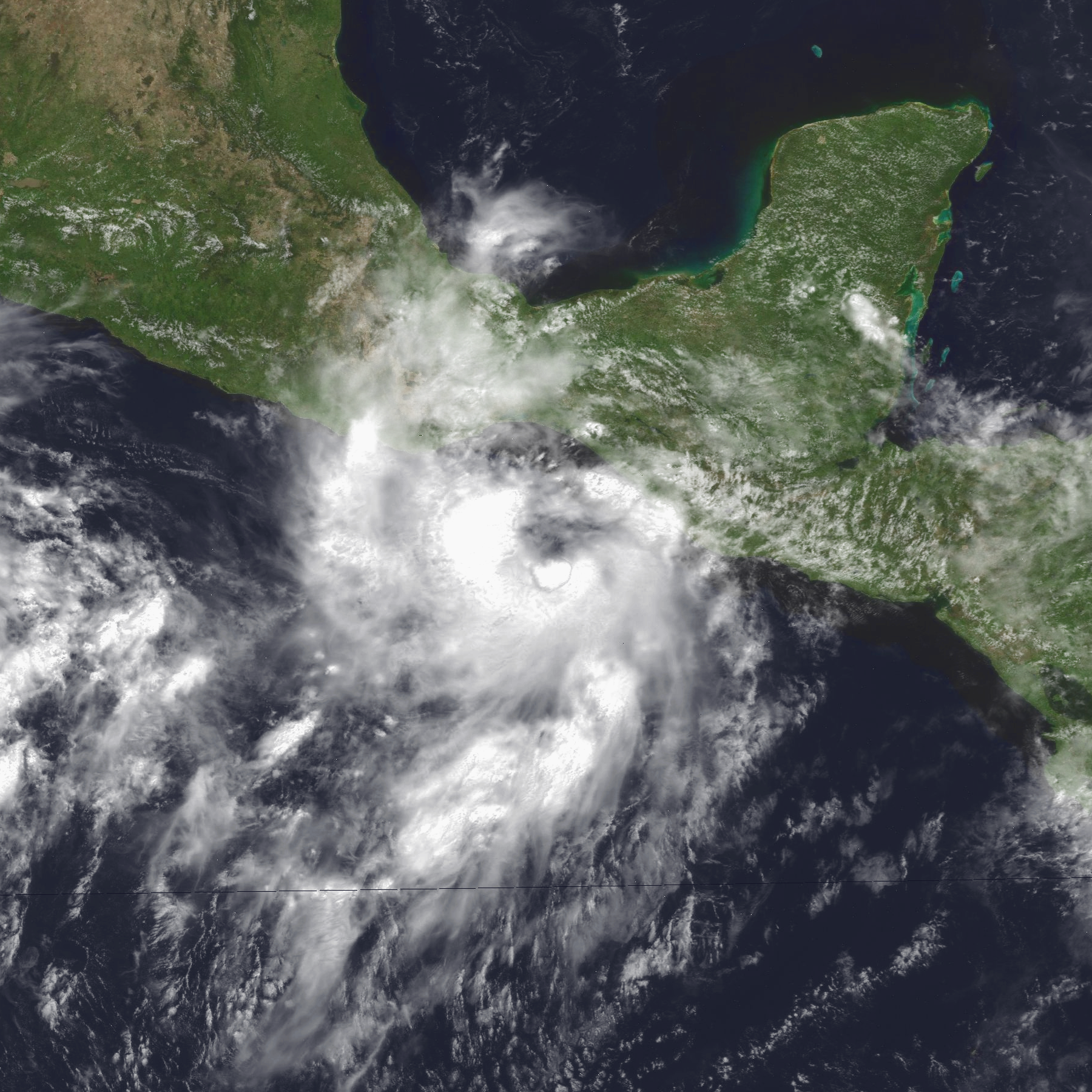
Tropical Storm Cristina over the Gulf of Tehuantepec on July 2

- 00:00 UTC (5:00 p.m. PDT, July 1) at 10.2°N 91.4°W – The recently formed tropical depression strengthens into Tropical Storm Cristina about 310 mi (500 km) south of Guatemala City, Guatemala.

July 3

- 06:00 UTC (11:00 p.m. PDT, July 2) at 15.3°N 95.9°W – Tropical Storm Cristina attains peak sustained winds of 70 mph (110 km/h) and a minimum central pressure of 991 mbar (29.26 inHg) about 45 mi (75 km) southeast of Puerto Ángel, Oaxaca.
- 09:00 UTC (2:00 a.m. PDT) at 15.7°N 96.2°W – Tropical Storm Cristina makes landfall near Puerto Ángel at peak intensity.
- 18:00 UTC (11:00 a.m. PDT) at 16.1°N 97.8°W – Tropical Storm Cristina weakens into a tropical depression inland, about 90 mi (150 km) west-northwest of Puerto Ángel; it dissipates within six hours over the Sierra Madre del Sur.

July 4

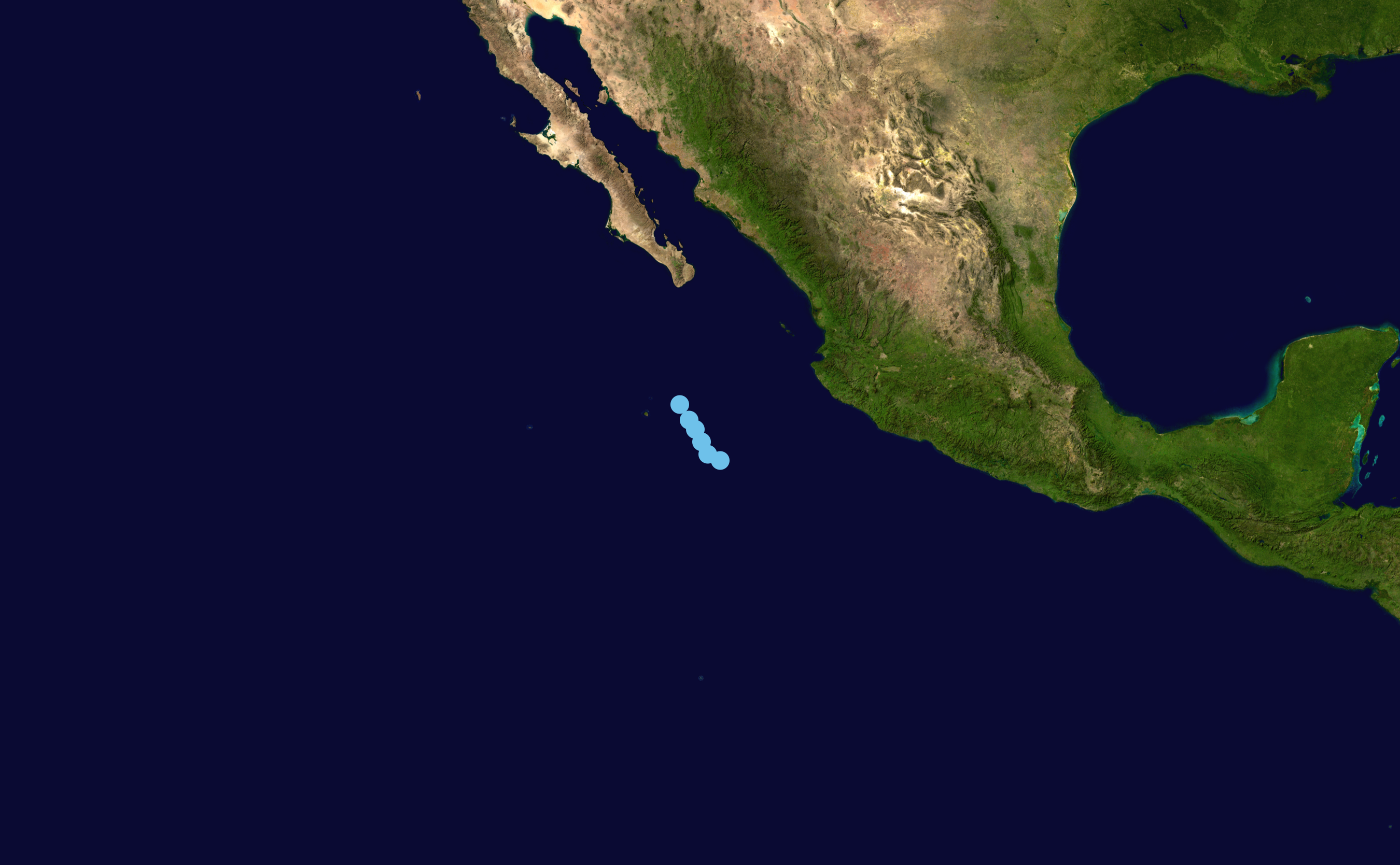
Storm path of Tropical Depression Six-E

- 18:00 UTC (11:00 a.m. PDT) at 17.3°N 108.6°W – Tropical Depression Six-E forms off the Pacific coast of Mexico.

July 5

- 00:00 UTC (5:00 p.m. PDT, July 4) at 17.5°N 109.0°W – Tropical Depression Six-E attains peak sustained winds of 35 mph (55 km/h) and a minimum central pressure of 1003 mbar (29.62 inHg).

July 6

- 00:00 UTC (5:00 p.m. PDT, July 5) at 19.1°N 109.9°W – Tropical Depression Six-E is last noted as a tropical cyclone; it dissipates within six hours.

July 29

- 00:00 UTC (5:00 p.m. PDT, July 28) at 13.0°N 89.7°W – Tropical Storm Cesar crosses over from the Atlantic basin and emerges from the Pacific coast of Central America, whereupon it is redesignated as Tropical Storm Douglas.
- 12:00 UTC (5:00 a.m. PDT) at 13.3°N 93.4°W – Tropical Storm Douglas strengthens into a Category 1 hurricane about 115 mi (185 km) southwest of the Mexico–Guatemala border.

July 30

- 18:00 UTC (11:00 a.m. PDT) at 14.9°N 102.0°W – Hurricane Douglas strengthens to Category 2 intensity off the Pacific coast of Mexico.

July 31

- 12:00 UTC (5:00 a.m. PDT) at 16.5°N 105.9°W – Hurricane Douglas strengthens to Category 3 intensity about 510 mi (825 km) south-southeast of the southern tip of the Baja California peninsula.

=== August ===
August 1

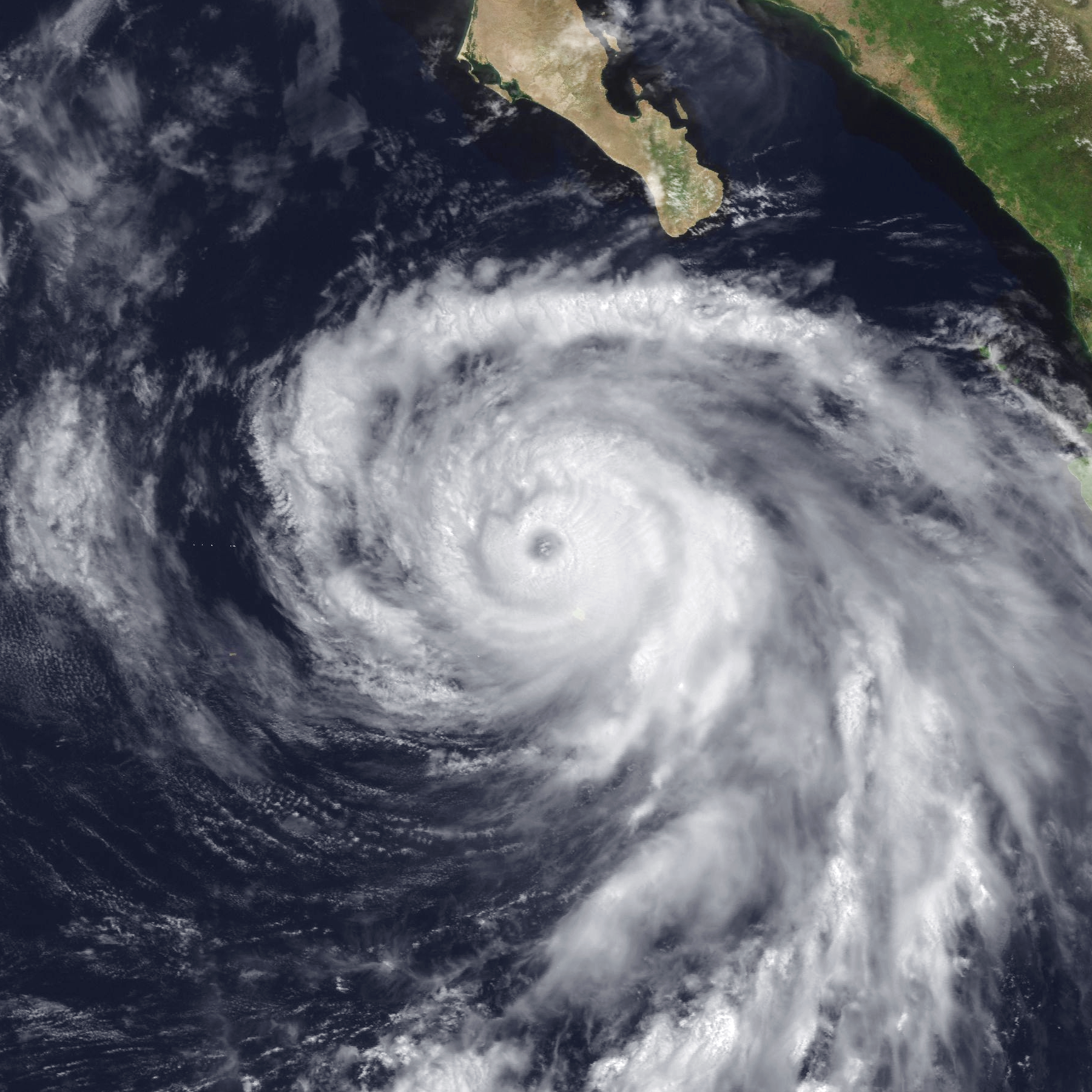
Hurricane Douglas shortly after peak intensity south of the Baja Peninsula on August 1

- 00:00 UTC (5:00 p.m. PDT, July 31) at 17.6°N 108.0°W – Hurricane Douglas strengthens to Category 4 intensity about 385 mi (620 km) south-southeast of the southern tip of the Baja California peninsula; it simultaneously attains peak sustained winds of 130 mph (215 km/h).
- 12:00 UTC (5:00 a.m. PDT) at 18.9°N 110.0°W – Hurricane Douglas attains a minimum central pressure of 946 mbar (27.94 inHg) about 275 mi (445 km) south of the southern tip of the Baja California peninsula.

August 2

- 12:00 UTC (5:00 a.m. PDT) at 20.6°N 115.4°W – Hurricane Douglas weakens to Category 3 intensity about 380 mi (610 km) west-southwest of the southern tip of the Baja California peninsula.

August 3

- 00:00 UTC (5:00 p.m. PDT, August 2) at 20.9°N 118.1°W – Hurricane Douglas rapidly weakens to Category 1 intensity about 540 mi (870 km) west-southwest of the southern tip of the Baja California peninsula.
- 12:00 UTC (5:00 a.m. PDT) at 21.1°N 120.3°W – Hurricane Douglas weakens into a tropical storm about 675 mi (1,085 km) west of the southern tip of the Baja California peninsula.

August 5

- 00:00 UTC (5:00 p.m. PDT, August 4) at 22.1°N 126.4°W – Tropical Storm Douglas weakens into a tropical depression about 1,045 mi (1,685 km) west of the southern tip of the Baja California peninsula.

August 6

- 00:00 UTC (5:00 p.m. PDT, August 5) at 22.5°N 130.0°W – Tropical Depression Douglas dissipates about 1,275 mi (2,055 km) west of the southern tip of the Baja California peninsula.

August 14

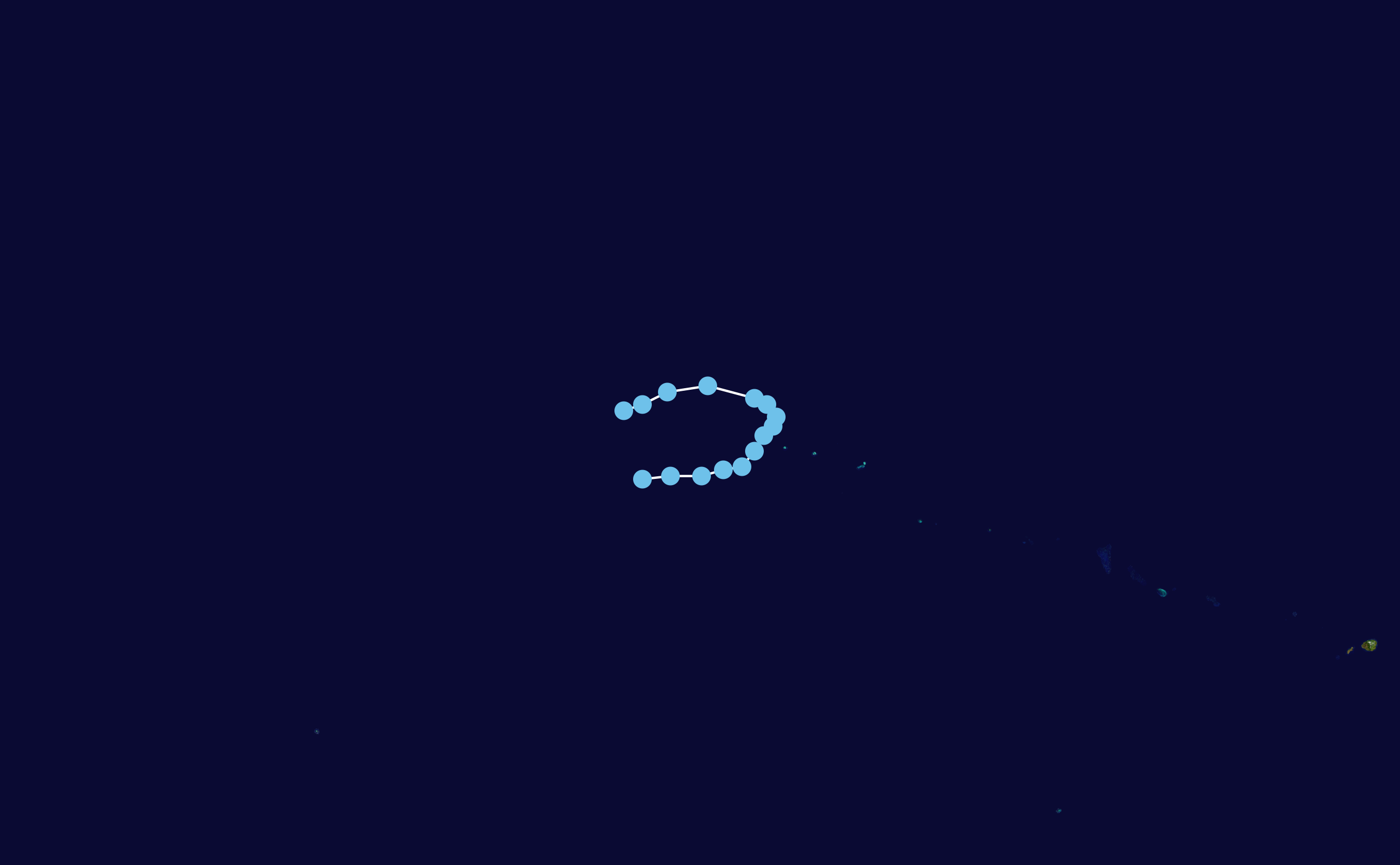
Storm path of Tropical Depression Seventeen-W

- 00:00 UTC (5:00 p.m. PDT, August 13) at 30.2°N 177.9°W – Tropical Depression Seventeen-W crosses the International Date Line, moving from the Western Pacific basin into the Central Pacific basin.

August 15

- 00:00 UTC (5:00 p.m. PDT, August 14) at 29.3°N 178.3°W – Tropical Depression Seventeen-W is last noted as a tropical cyclone.

August 24

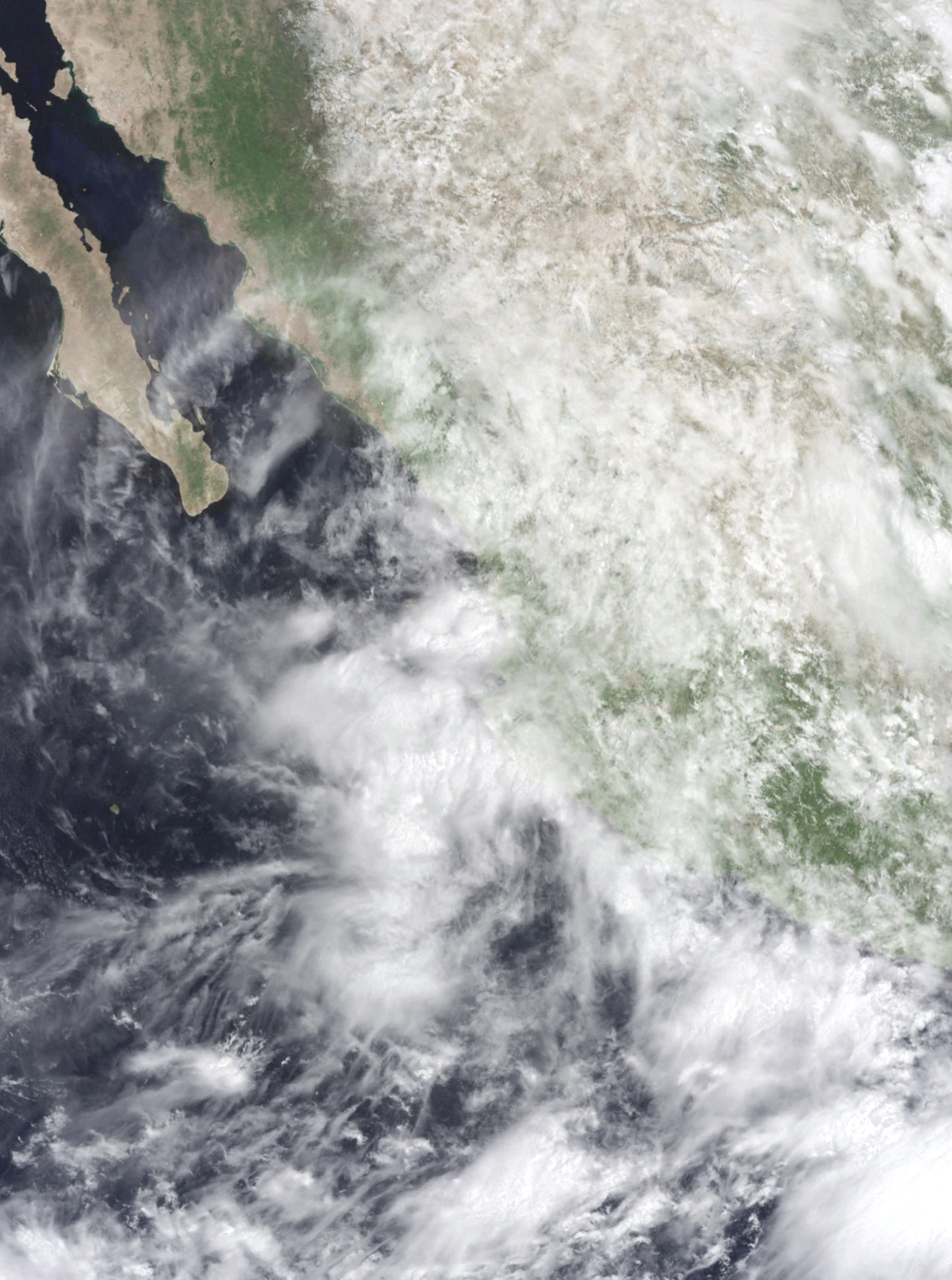
Tropical Depression Dolly in the Eastern Pacific on August 24

- 18:00 UTC (11:00 a.m. PDT) at 21.7°N 105.7°W – Tropical Depression Dolly crosses over from the Atlantic basin and emerges from the Pacific coast of Mexico; it simultaneously attains peak sustained winds of 25 mph (35 km/h) and a minimum central pressure of 1005 mbar (29.68 inHg).

August 25

- 00:00 UTC (5:00 p.m. PDT, August 24) at 21.8°N 107.3°W – Tropical Depression Dolly is last noted as a tropical cyclone; it dissipates within six hours.

August 30

- 12:00 UTC (5:00 a.m. PDT) at 13.4°N 103.5°W – A tropical depression forms from a tropical wave off the Pacific coast of Mexico.

=== September ===
September 2

- 06:00 UTC (11:00 p.m. PDT, September 1) at 18.3°N 110.2°W – The recently formed tropical depression strengthens into Tropical Storm Elida about 65 mi (100 km) southeast of Socorro Island.

September 4

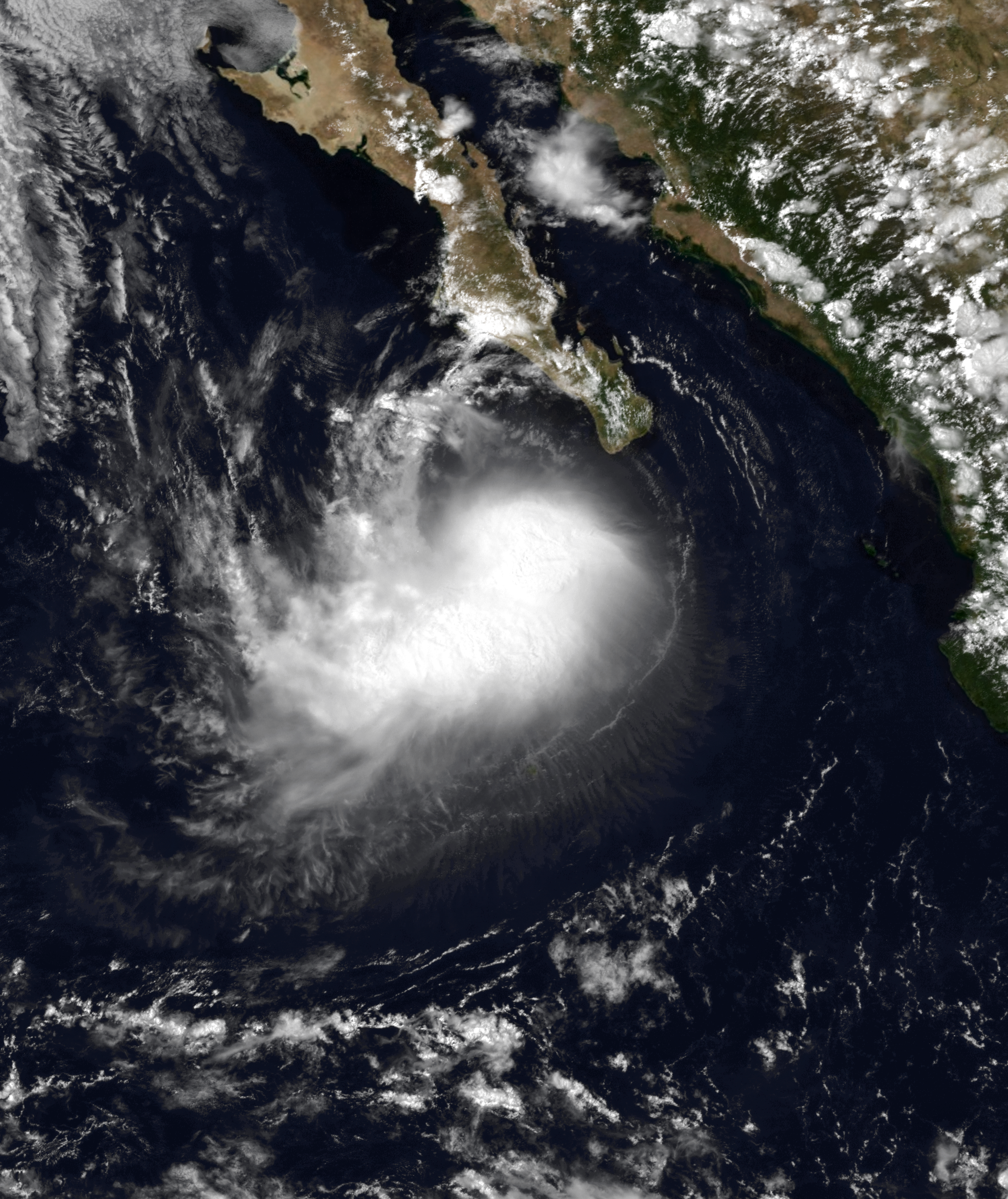
Tropical Storm Elida approaching peak intensity on September 3

- 00:00 UTC (5:00 p.m. PDT, September 3) at 21.7°N 111.8°W – Tropical Storm Elida attains peak sustained winds of 65 mph (100 km/h) about 145 mi (230 km) southwest of the southern tip of the Baja California peninsula.
- 06:00 UTC (11:00 p.m. PDT, September 3) at 22.2°N 112.1°W – Tropical Storm Elida attains a minimum central pressure of 994 mbar (29.35 inHg) about 145 mi (230 km) west-southwest of the southern tip of the Baja California peninsula.

September 5

- 12:00 UTC (5:00 a.m. PDT) at 23.9°N 112.9°W – Tropical Storm Elida weakens into a tropical depression about 200 mi (325 km) west-northwest of the southern tip of the Baja California peninsula.

September 6

- 12:00 UTC (5:00 a.m. PDT) at 24.7°N 113.3°W – Tropical Depression Elida is last noted as a tropical cyclone about 245 mi (400 km) west-northwest of the southern tip of the Baja California peninsula; it dissipates within six hours.

September 10

- 00:00 UTC (5:00 p.m. PDT, September 9) at 14.3°N 101.9°W – A tropical depression forms from an area of unsettled weather about 225 mi (360 km) southwest of Acapulco.
- 18:00 UTC (11:00 a.m. PDT) at 15.8°N 104.3°W – The recently formed tropical depression strengthens into Tropical Storm Fausto about 225 mi (360 km) south of Manzanillo.

September 11

- 12:00 UTC (5:00 a.m. PDT) at 17.8°N 107.3°W – Tropical Storm Fausto strengthens into a Category 1 hurricane about 215 mi (345 km) west-southwest of Manzanillo.

September 12

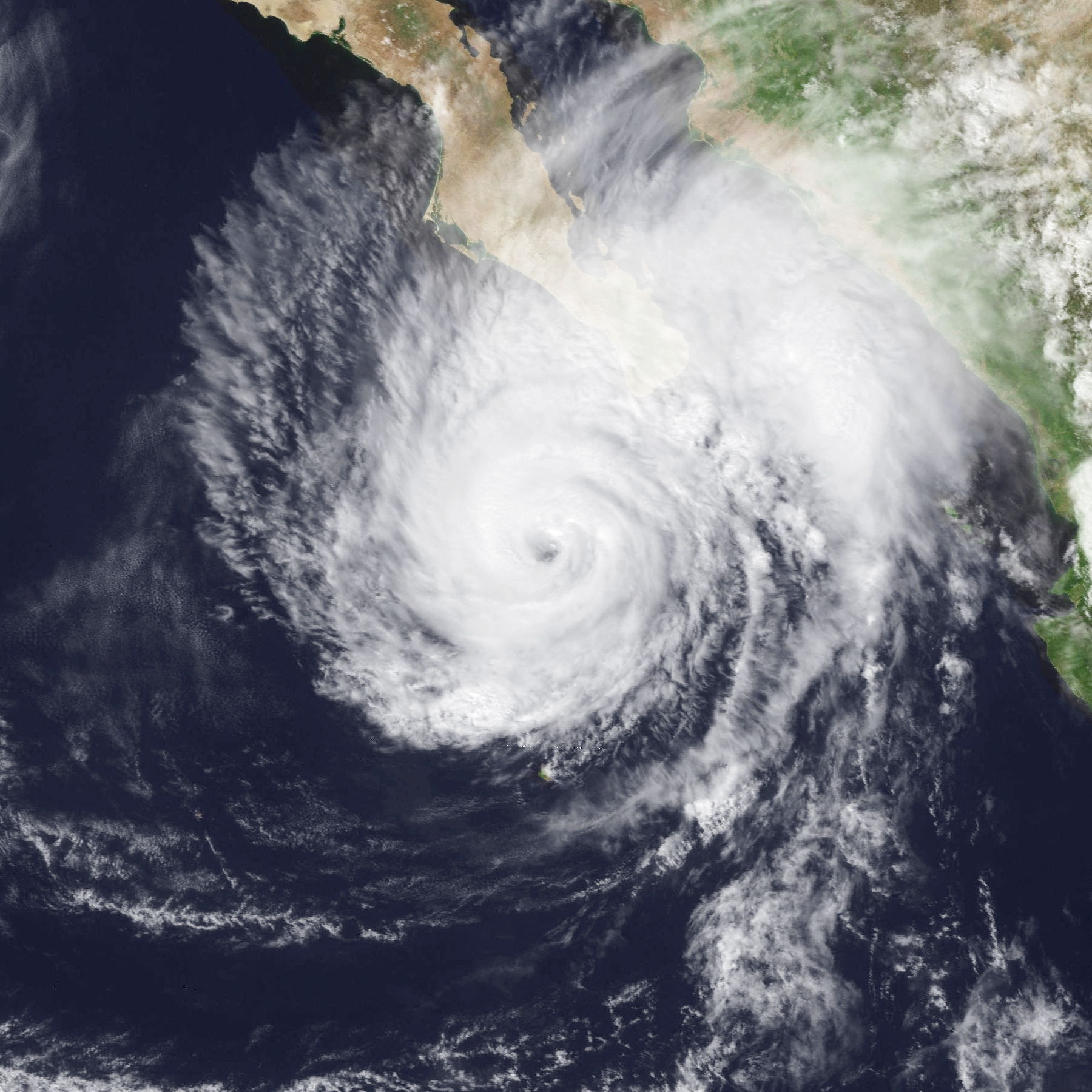
Hurricane Fausto shortly after peak intensity just south of the Baja Peninsula on September 12

- 00:00 UTC (5:00 p.m. PDT, September 11) at 19.1°N 108.9°W – Hurricane Fausto strengthens to Category 2 intensity about 270 mi (435 km) south-southeast of the southern tip of the Baja California peninsula.
- 06:00 UTC (11:00 p.m. PDT, September 11) at 19.8°N 109.5°W – Hurricane Fausto strengthens to Category 3 intensity about 215 mi (345 km) south of the southern tip of the Baja California peninsula, and simultaneously attains peak sustained winds of 120 mph (195 km/h) and a minimum central pressure of 955 mbar (28.20 inHg).

September 13

- 00:00 UTC (5:00 p.m. PDT, September 12) at 21.6°N 110.6°W – Hurricane Fausto weakens to Category 2 intensity about 100 mi (155 km) south-southwest of the southern tip of the Baja California peninsula.
- 12:00 UTC (5:00 a.m. PDT) at 22.6°N 110.7°W – Hurricane Fausto weakens to Category 1 intensity about 50 mi (85 km) west-southwest of the southern tip of the Baja California peninsula.
- 20:00 UTC (1:00 p.m. PDT) at 23.6°N 110.5°W – Hurricane Fausto makes landfall near Todos Santos, Baja California Sur, with sustained winds of 85 mph (140 km/h) and a central pressure of 980 mbar (28.94 inHg).

September 14

- 06:00 UTC (11:00 p.m. PDT, September 13) at 25.7°N 109.6°W – Hurricane Fausto, after crossing the Gulf of California, makes landfall near Los Mochis, Sinaloa, with sustained winds of 75 mph (120 km/h) and a central pressure of 990 mbar (29.23 inHg).
- 12:00 UTC (5:00 a.m. PDT) at 27.3°N 109.0°W – Hurricane Fausto weakens into a tropical storm inland, about 105 mi (165 km) north of Los Mochis.
- 18:00 UTC (11:00 a.m. PDT) at 28.0°N 107.0°W – Tropical Storm Fausto weakens into a tropical depression inland, about 195 mi (315 km) northeast of Los Mochis; it dissipates within six hours over the Sierra Madre Occidental.

September 16

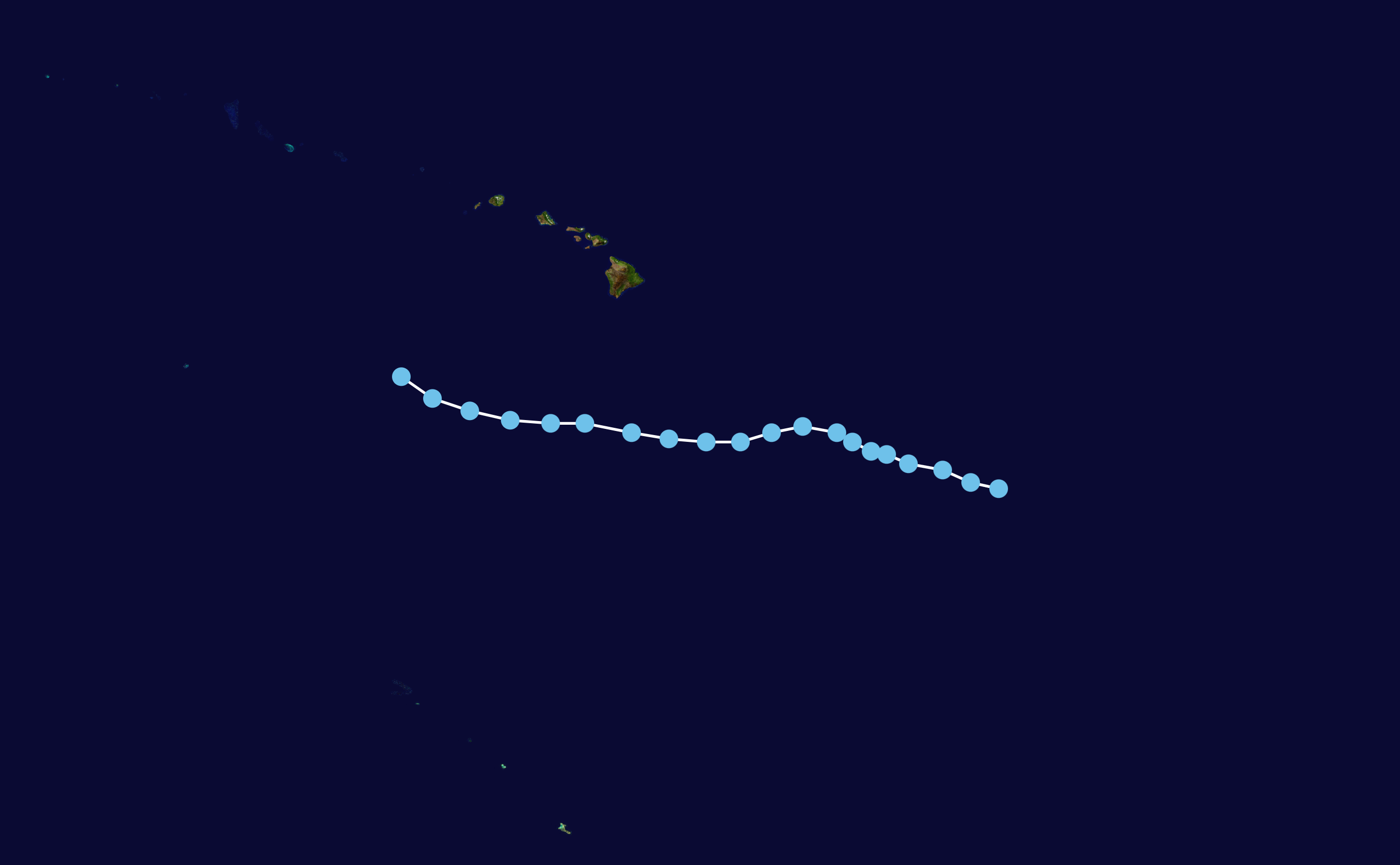
Storm path of Tropical Depression One-C

- 00:00 UTC (5:00 p.m. PDT, September 15) at 12.8°N 143.4°W – Tropical Depression One-C forms from a tropical disturbance.
- 18:00 UTC (11:00 a.m. PDT) at 13.4°N 146.3°W – Tropical Depression One-C attains peak sustained winds of 35 mph (55 km/h).

September 20

- 18:00 UTC (11:00 a.m. PDT) at 16.4°N 162.6°W – Tropical Depression One-C is last noted as a tropical cyclone.

September 27

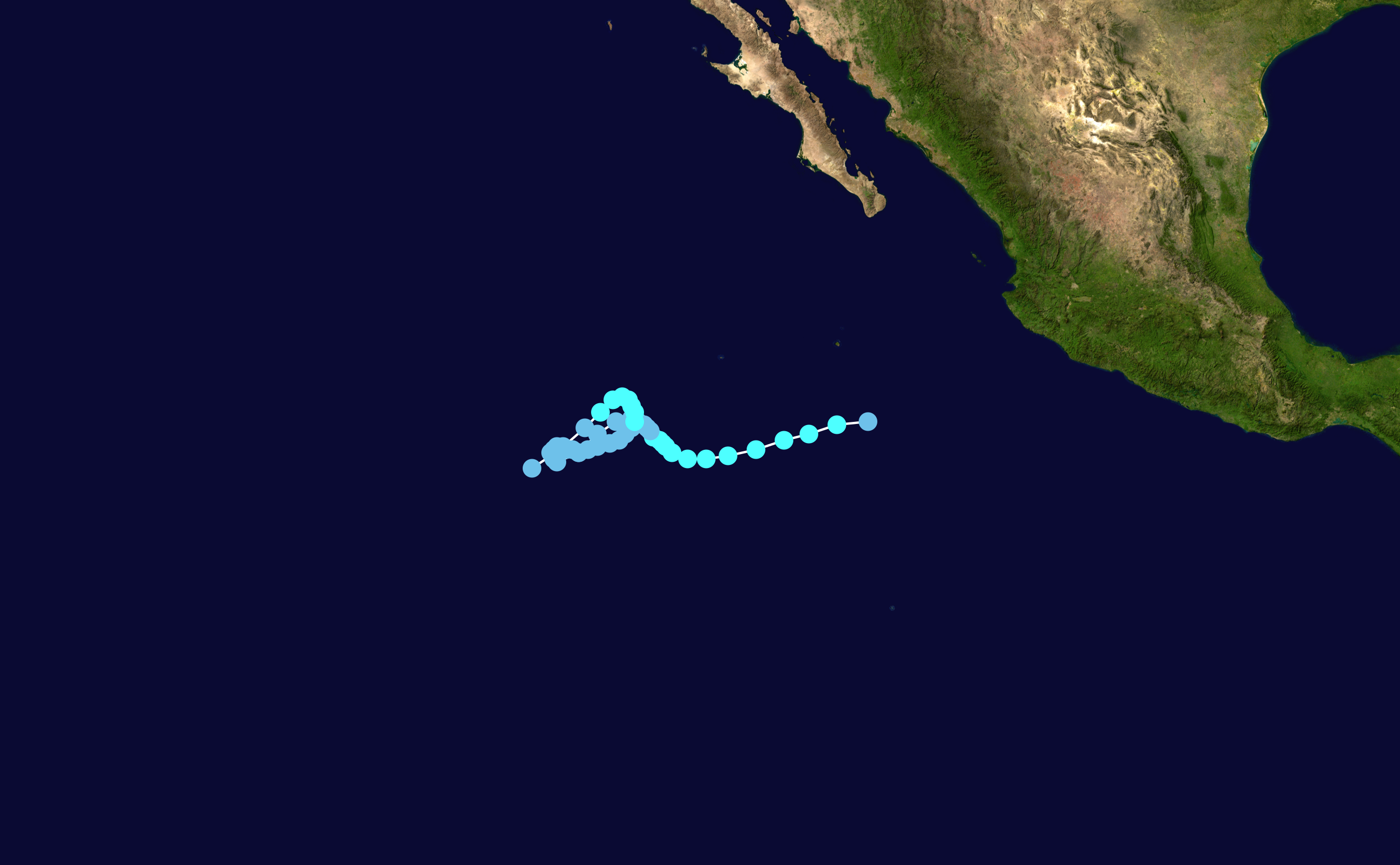
Storm path of Tropical Storm Genevieve

- 18:00 UTC (11:00 a.m. PDT) at 16.3°N 110.0°W – A tropical depression forms from a tropical disturbance about 455 mi (730 km) south of the southern tip of the Baja California peninsula.

September 28

- 00:00 UTC (5:00 p.m. PDT, September 27) at 16.2°N 111.0°W – The recently formed tropical depression strengthens into Tropical Storm Genevieve about 465 mi (750 km) south of the southern tip of the Baja California peninsula.
- 18:00 UTC (11:00 a.m. PDT) at 15.4°N 113.6°W – Tropical Storm Genevieve attains peak sustained winds of 50 mph (85 km/h) about 570 mi (915 km) south-southwest of the southern tip of the Baja California peninsula.

September 29

- 12:00 UTC (5:00 a.m. PDT) at 15.1°N 115.8°W – Tropical Storm Genevieve attains a minimum central pressure of 999 mbar (29.50 inHg) about 655 mi (1,055 km) southwest of the southern tip of the Baja California peninsula.

September 30

- 06:00 UTC (5:00 p.m. PDT, September 29) at 12.6°N 98.7°W – Tropical Depression Eleven-E forms from a tropical wave about 305 mi (490 km) south-southeast of Acapulco.
- 18:00 UTC (11:00 a.m. PDT) at 12.9°N 100.7°W – Tropical Depression Eleven-E strengthens into Tropical Storm Hernan about 275 mi (445 km) south of Acapulco.

=== October ===
October 1

- 00:00 UTC (5:00 p.m. PDT, September 30) at 16.0°N 117.0°W – Tropical Storm Genevieve weakens into a tropical depression about 660 mi (1,065 km) southwest of the southern tip of the Baja California peninsula.

October 2

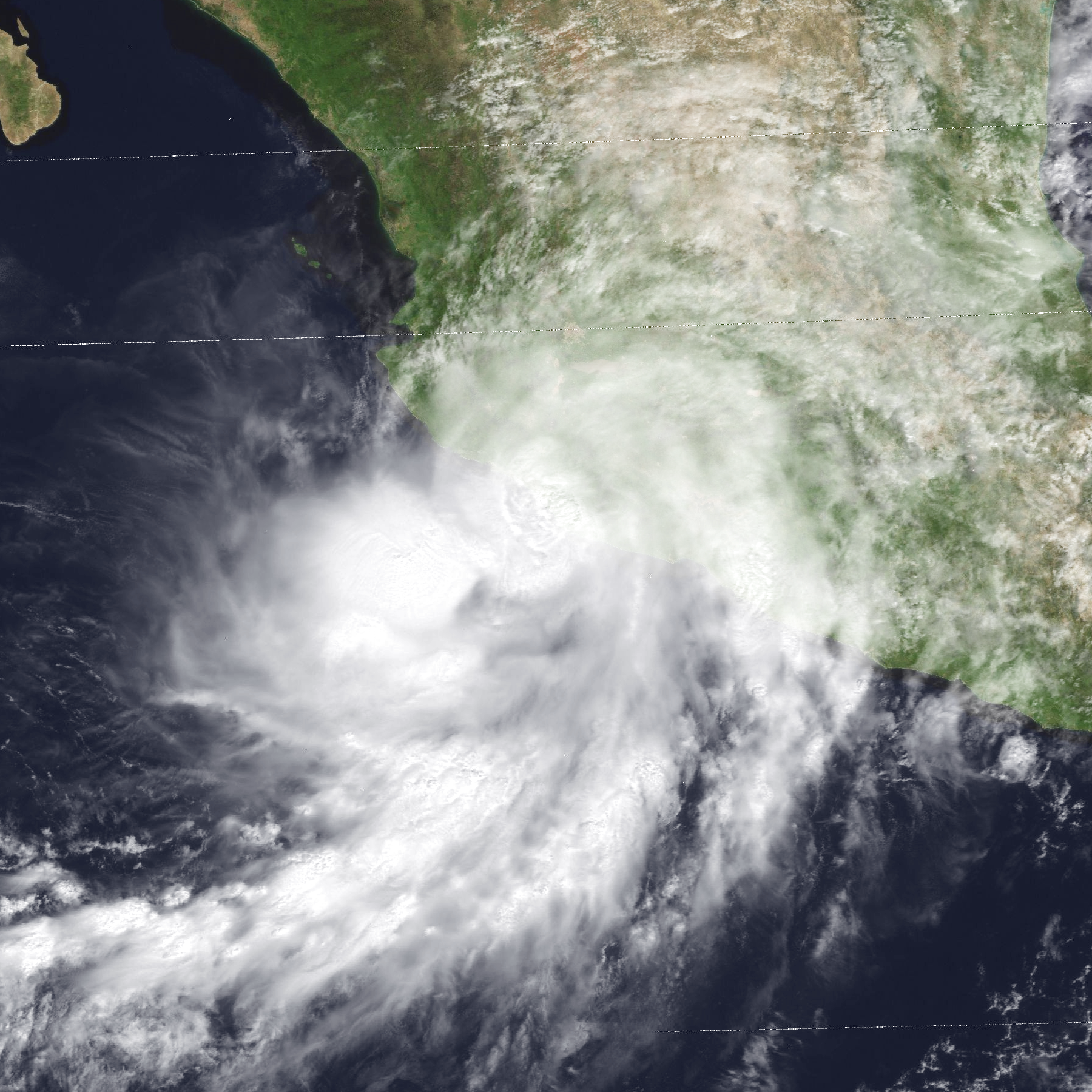
Hurricane Hernan at peak intensity near landfall in southwest Mexico on October 2

- 06:00 UTC (11:00 p.m. PDT, October 1) at 16.9°N 102.3°W – Tropical Storm Hernan strengthens into a Category 1 hurricane about 75 mi (120 km) south of Lázaro Cárdenas.
- 12:00 UTC (5:00 a.m. PDT) at 17.9°N 103.1°W – Hurricane Hernan attains peak sustained winds of 85 mph (140 km/h) and a minimum central pressure of 980 mbar (28.94 inHg) about 60 mi (95 km) west of Lázaro Cárdenas.

October 3

- 10:00 UTC (3:00 a.m. PDT) at 18.8°N 104.9°W – Hurricane Hernan makes landfall about 30 mi (45 km) south-southwest of Barra de Navidad, Jalisco, with sustained winds of 75 mph (120 km/h) and a central pressure of 987 mbar (29.15 inHg).
- 12:00 UTC (5:00 a.m. PDT) at 19.5°N 104.9°W – Hurricane Hernan weakens into a tropical storm inland, about 25 mi (35 km) northwest of Barra de Navidad.

October 4

- 00:00 UTC (5:00 p.m. PDT, October 3) at 20.7°N 105.1°W – Tropical Storm Hernan weakens into a tropical depression inland, about 10 mi (20 km) east-southeast of Puerto Vallarta.
- 18:00 UTC (11:00 a.m. PDT) at 22.0°N 105.5°W – Tropical Depression Hernan, after moving off shore, is last noted as a tropical cyclone about 100 mi (155 km) north of Puerto Vallarta; it dissipates within six hours.

October 6

- 18:00 UTC (11:00 a.m. PDT) at 16.3°N 117.5°W – Tropical Depression Genevieve restrengthens into a tropical storm about 665 mi (1,075 km) southwest of the southern tip of the Baja California peninsula.

October 8

- 12:00 UTC (5:00 a.m. PDT) at 16.1°N 119.1°W – Tropical Storm Genevieve weakens back into a tropical depression about 755 mi (1,215 km) southwest of the southern tip of the Baja California peninsula.

October 9

- 00:00 UTC (5:00 p.m. PDT, October 8) at 14.8°N 120.8°W – Tropical Depression Genevieve is last noted as a tropical cyclone about 905 mi (1,455 km) southwest of the southern tip of the Baja California peninsula; it dissipates within six hours.

=== November ===
November 7

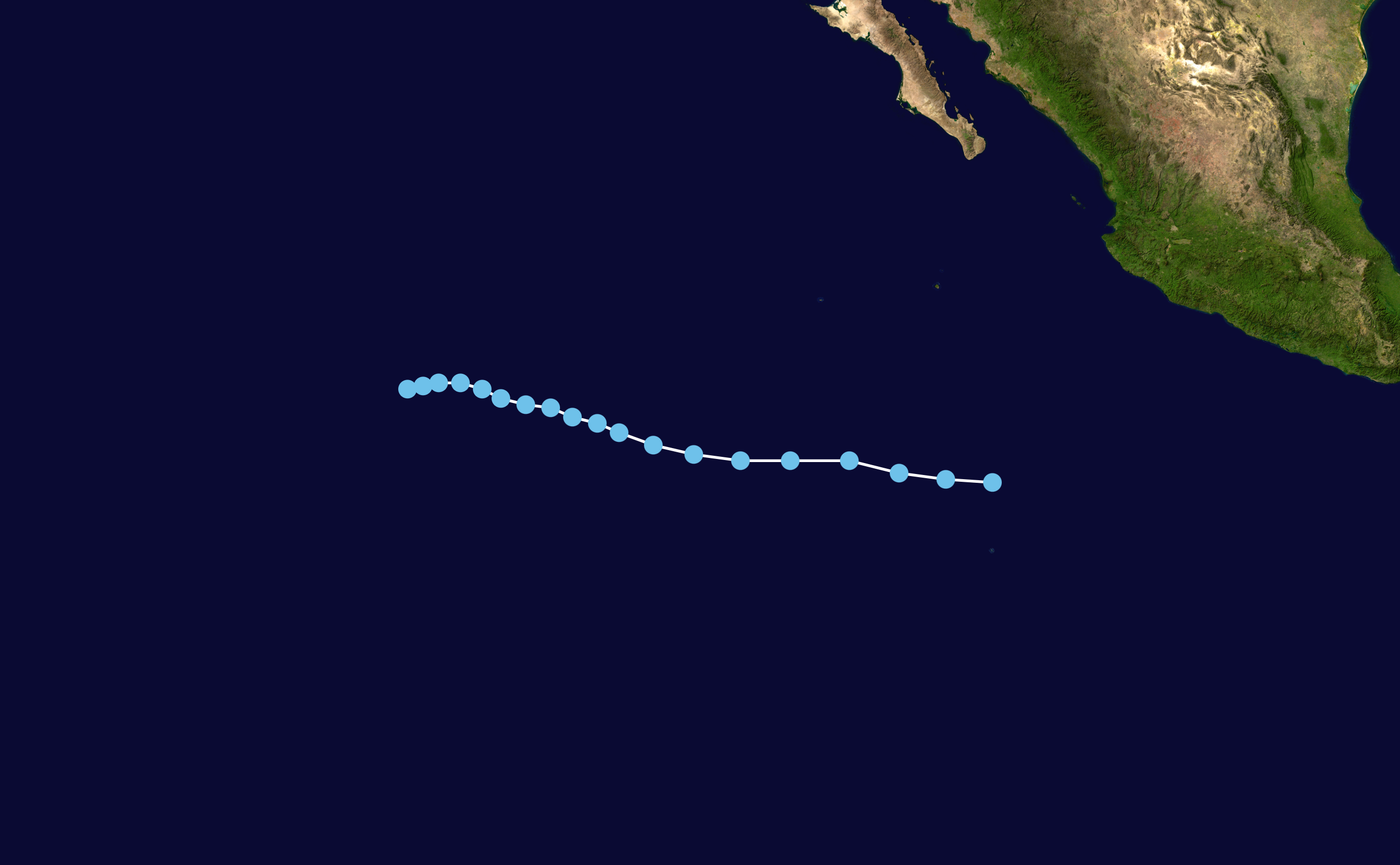
Storm path of Tropical Depression Twelve-E

- 00:00 UTC (5:00 p.m. PDT, November 6) at 12.5°N 109.2°W – Tropical Depression Twelve-E forms well off the Pacific coast of Mexico.

November 8

- 12:00 UTC (5:00 a.m. PDT) at 13.4°N 118.8°W – Tropical Depression Twelve-E attains peak sustained winds of 35 mph (55 km/h) and a minimum central pressure of 1003 mbar (29.62 inHg).

November 11

- 06:00 UTC (11:00 p.m. PDT, November 10) at 15.6°N 127.5°W – Tropical Depression Twelve-E is last noted as a tropical cyclone; it dissipates within six hours.

November 30

- The 1996 Pacific hurricane season officially ends.

== See also ==
- Timeline of the 1996 Atlantic hurricane season
- Pacific hurricane season
- Tropical cyclones in 1996
