= Timeline of the 1996 Atlantic hurricane season =

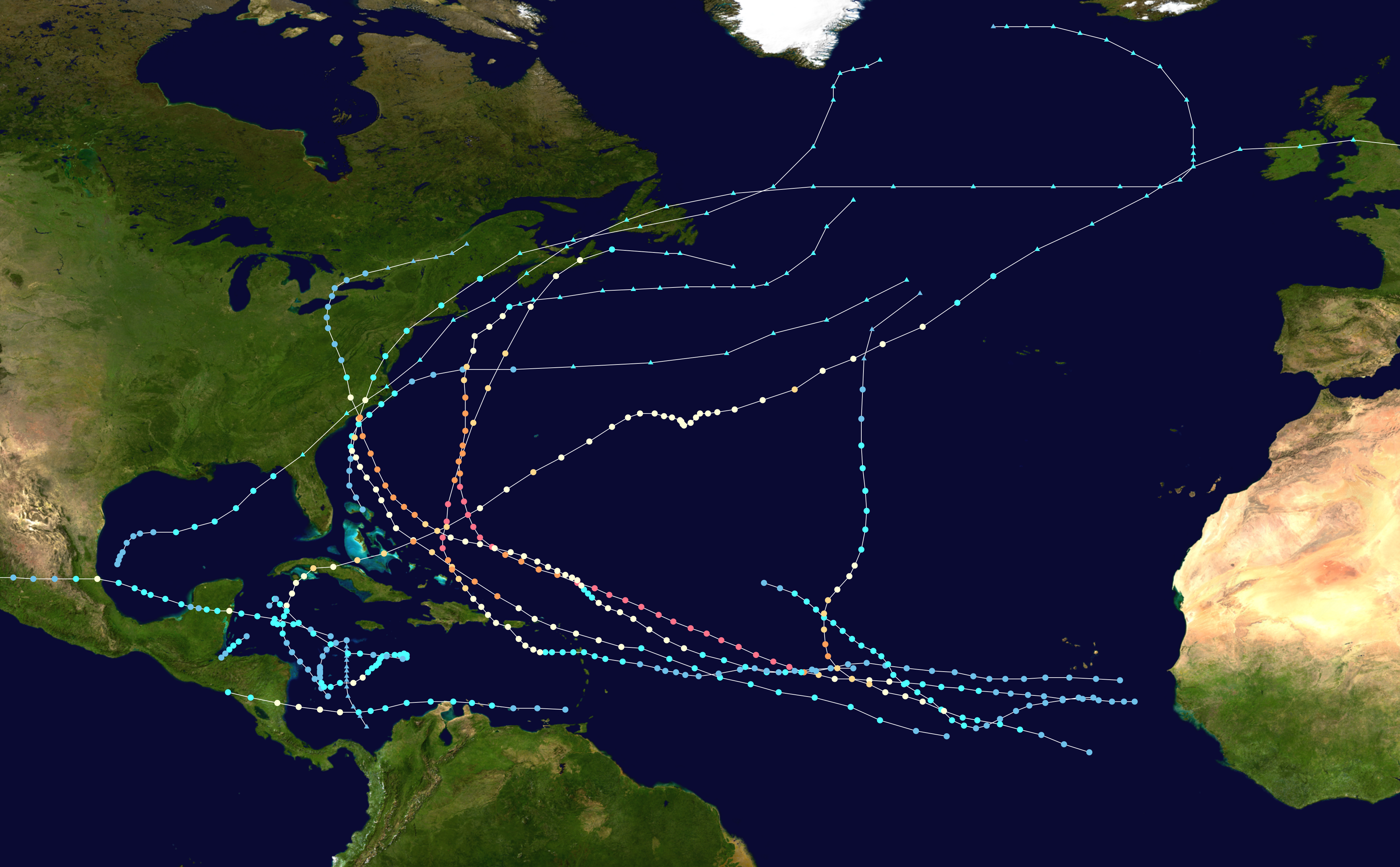
- Season summary map

Season boundaries
- First system formed: June 17, 1996
- Last system dissipated: November 26, 1996

Strongest system
- Name: Edouard
- Maximum winds: 145 mph (230 km/h) (1-minute sustained)
- Lowest pressure: 933 mbar (hPa; 27.55 inHg)

Longest lasting system
- Name: Fran
- Duration: 15.5 days
Storm articles
- Hurricane Bertha (1996)
- Hurricane Cesar–Douglas
- Hurricane Dolly (1996)
- Hurricane Edouard (1996)
- Hurricane Fran
- Hurricane Hortense
- Tropical Storm Josephine (1996)
- Hurricane Lili (1996)
- Hurricane Marco (1996)

The 1996 Atlantic hurricane season consisted of the events that occurred in the annual cycle of tropical cyclone formation over the Atlantic Ocean north of the equator. The official bounds of each Atlantic hurricane season are dates that conventionally delineate the period each year during which tropical cyclones tend to form in the basin according to the National Hurricane Center, beginning on June 1 and ending on November 30. However, tropical cyclogenesis is possible at any time of the year. Activity during the season was above average; (Note: At the time, an average season comprised ten tropical storms, six hurricanes, and two major hurricanes.) thirteen named storms developed, with nine becoming hurricanes and six further strengthening into major hurricanes. (Note: A major hurricane is an Atlantic or Pacific hurricane that reaches Category 3 or higher on the five-level Saffir–Simpson scale, with maximum sustained winds of at least 111 mph (179 km/h).) The first system, Tropical Storm Arthur, formed on June 17; the last, Hurricane Marco, dissipated on November 26.

The season's most destructive storms were Hurricane Cesar, Hurricane Fran, and Hurricane Hortense. Hurricane Cesar (later known as Hurricane Douglas in the Eastern Pacific basin) was the deadliest storm of the season; it killed at least 51 people and caused severe damage in northern Colombia and southern Central America. Hurricane Fran caused $3.2 billion (1996 USD) worth of damage in the United States, mostly in North Carolina, and killed 26 people. Hurricane Hortense dropped torrential rainfall on southwestern Puerto Rico and the eastern Dominican Republic, killing 21 people and leaving behind $127 million (1996 USD) in damage.

This timeline documents tropical cyclone formations, strengthening, weakening, landfalls, extratropical transitions, and dissipations during the season. It includes information that was not released throughout the season, meaning that data from post-storm reviews by the National Hurricane Center, such as a storm that was not initially warned upon, has been included.

The time stamp for each event is first stated using Coordinated Universal Time (UTC), the 24-hour clock where 00:00 = midnight UTC. The NHC uses both UTC and the time zone where the center of the tropical cyclone is currently located. The time zones utilized (east to west) prior to 2020 were: Atlantic, Eastern, and Central. In this timeline, the respective area time is included in parentheses. Additionally, figures for maximum sustained winds and position estimates are rounded to the nearest 5 units (miles, or kilometers), following National Hurricane Center practice. Direct wind observations are rounded to the nearest whole number. Atmospheric pressures are listed to the nearest millibar and nearest hundredth of an inch of mercury.

== Timeline of storms ==
=== June ===
June 1

- The 1996 Atlantic hurricane season officially begins.

June 17

Tropical Storm Arthur near landfall in North Carolina on June 19

- 18:00 UTC (2:00 pm EDT) at 26.8°N 77.8°W – The first tropical depression of the season forms near eastern Grand Bahama.

June 19

- 00:00 UTC (8:00 pm EDT, June 18) at 31.5°N 78.7°W – The tropical depression strengthens into Tropical Storm Arthur about 245 miles (400 km) south-southwest of Cape Lookout, North Carolina.
- 12:00 UTC (8:00 am EDT) at 33.2°N 78.1°W – Tropical Storm Arthur reaches peak winds of 45 mph (75 km/h) about 130 miles (215 km) southwest of Cape Lookout, North Carolina. (Note: The figures for maximum sustained winds and position estimates are rounded to the nearest 5 units (knots, miles, or kilometers), following the convention used in the National Hurricane Center's operational products for each storm. All other units are rounded to the nearest digit.)

June 20

- 00:00 UTC (8:00 pm EDT, June 19) at 34.7°N 76.4°W – Tropical Storm Arthur makes landfall near Cape Lookout, North Carolina with winds of 40 mph (65 km/h) and a barometric pressure of 1,005 mbar (29.68 inHg).
- 12:00 UTC (8:00 am EDT) at 36.4°N 74.1°W – Tropical Storm Arthur weakens into a tropical depression about 115 miles (185 km) northeast of Cape Hatteras, North Carolina.

June 21

- 06:00 UTC (2:00 am EDT) at 37.3°N 66.5°W – Tropical Depression Arthur reaches a minimum barometric pressure of 1,002 mbar (29.59 inHg) about 355 miles (575 km) north-northwest of Bermuda.
- 12:00 UTC (8:00 am EDT) at 37.5°N 62.0°W – Tropical Depression Arthur transitions into an extratropical gale about 405 miles (650 km) north-northeast of Bermuda.

=== July ===
July 5

- 00:00 UTC (8:00 pm AST, July 4) at 9.8°N 34.0°W – The second tropical depression of the season forms about 790 miles (1,270 km) southwest of Cape Verde.
- 12:00 UTC (8:00 am AST) at 11.0°N 39.0°W – The tropical depression strengthens into Tropical Storm Bertha about 1,070 miles (1,725 km) west-southwest of Cape Verde.

July 7

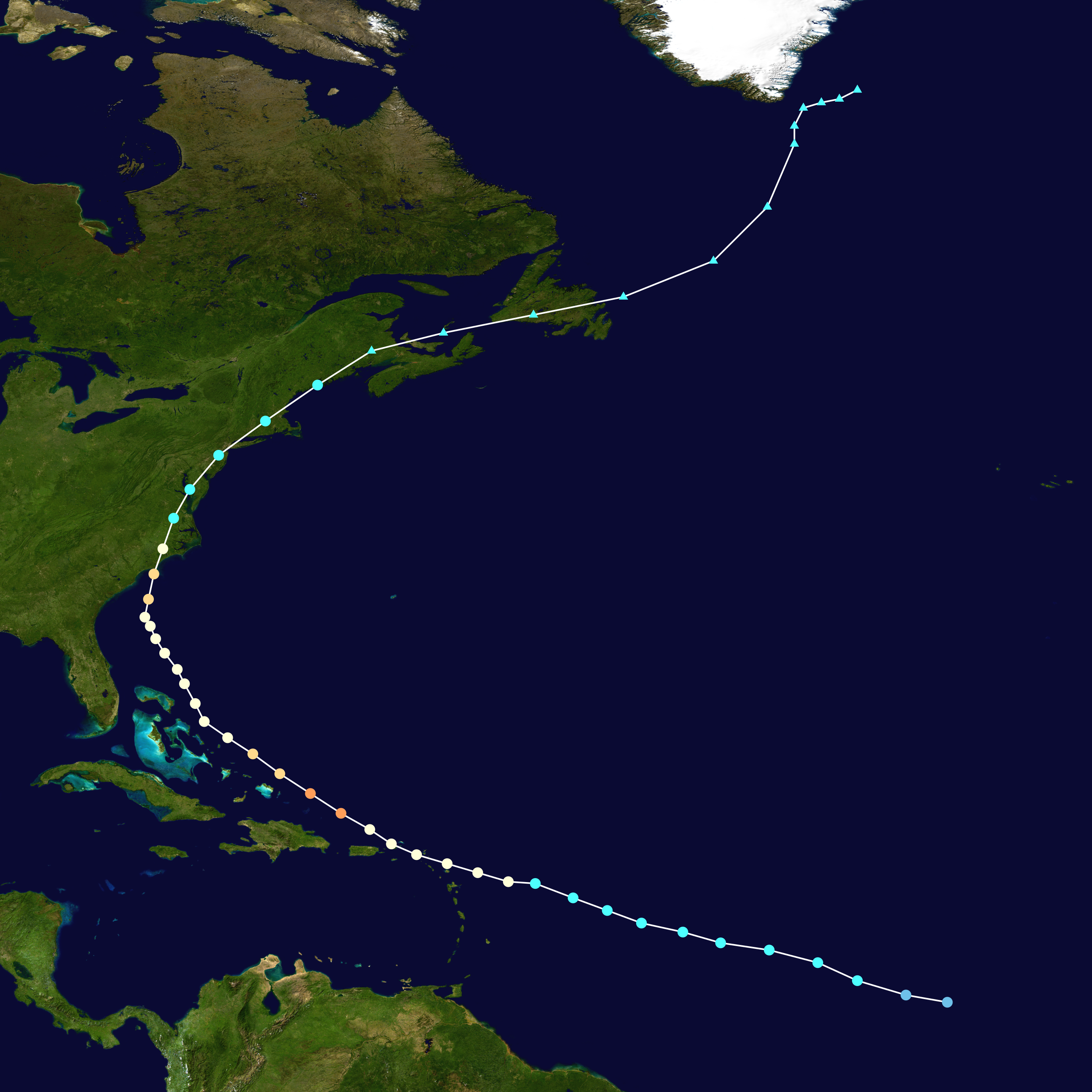
Hurricane Bertha storm path

- 18:00 UTC (2:00 pm AST) at 16.5°N 58.4°W – Tropical Storm Bertha strengthens into a Category 1 hurricane about 220 miles (350 km) east of Antigua.

July 9

- 06:00 UTC (2:00 am EDT) at 20.3°N 67.7°W – Hurricane Bertha rapidly strengthens to Category 3 intensity, skipping Category 2 status, about 140 miles (220 km/h) north of Puerto Rico, making it the first major hurricane of the season. It simultaneously reaches peak winds of 115 mph (185 km/h) and a minimum barometric pressure of 960 mbar (28.35 inHg).
- 18:00 UTC (2:00 pm EDT) at 22.5°N 71.1°W – Hurricane Bertha weakens to Category 2 intensity about 70 miles (110 km) northeast of the Turks and Caicos Islands.

July 10

- 06:00 UTC (2:00 am EDT) at 24.5°N 74.0°W – Hurricane Bertha weakens to Category 1 intensity about 40 miles (65 km) northeast of San Salvador Island.

July 12

- 12:00 UTC (8:00 am EDT) at 32.2°N 78.4°W – Hurricane Bertha regains Category 2 intensity about 100 miles (155 km) east-southeast of Charleston, South Carolina.
- 20:00 UTC (4:00 pm EDT) at 34.3°N 77.8°W – Hurricane Bertha makes landfall between Wrightsville and Topsail Beaches in North Carolina with winds of 105 mph (165 km/h) and a barometric pressure of 974 mbar (28.76 inHg).

July 13

- 00:00 UTC (8:00 pm EDT, July 12) at 35.0°N 77.6°W – Hurricane Bertha weakens back to Category 1 intensity inland over eastern North Carolina.
- 06:00 UTC (2:00 am EDT) at 36.7°N 77.0°W – Hurricane Bertha weakens into a tropical storm about 40 miles (65 km) southwest of Newport News, Virginia.

July 14

- 12:00 UTC (8:00 am EDT) at 46.0°N 66.0°W – Tropical Storm Bertha becomes extratropical over the Canadian province of New Brunswick.

July 24

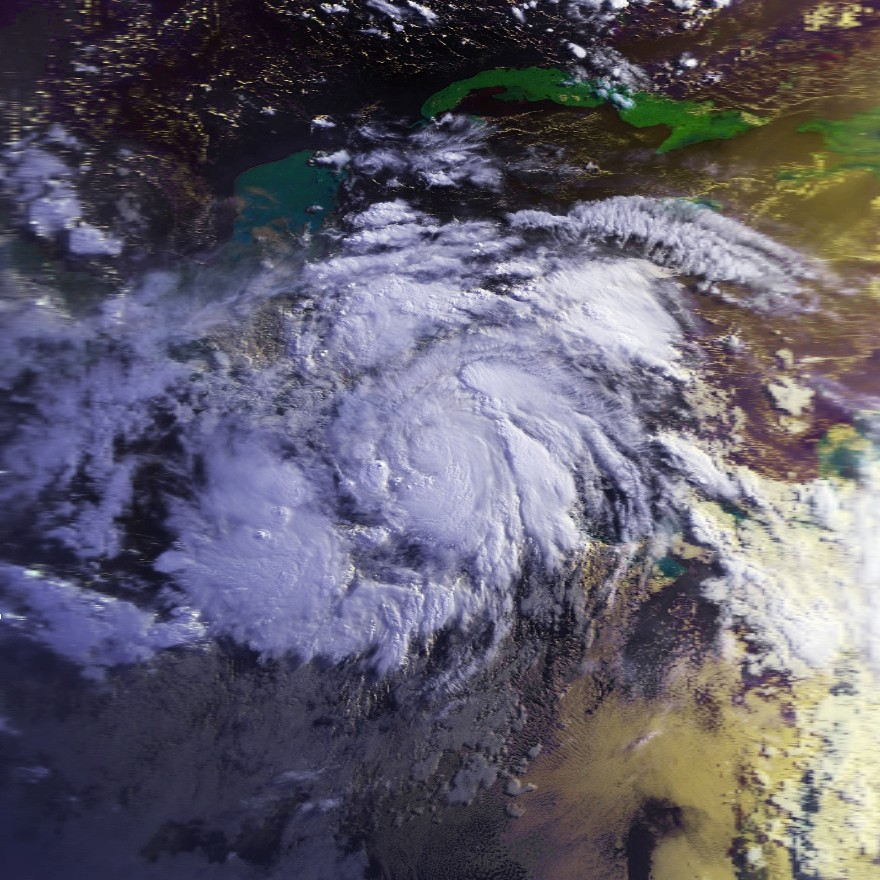
Hurricane Cesar at landfall in Nicaragua

- 18:00 UTC (2:00 pm EDT) at 11.8°N 62.6°W – The third tropical depression of the season forms just north of Isla Margarita.

July 25

- 12:00 UTC (8:00 am EDT) at 12.1°N 68.1°W – The tropical depression strengthens into Tropical Storm Cesar near Curaçao.

July 27

- 12:00 UTC (8:00 am EDT) at 11.6°N 79.5°W – Tropical Storm Cesar strengthens into a Category 1 hurricane over the southwestern Caribbean Sea.

July 28

- 04:00 UTC (12:00 am EDT) at 12.2°N 83.9°W – Hurricane Cesar makes landfall just north of Bluefields, Nicaragua. It simultaneously reaches peak winds of 85 mph (140 km/h) and a minimum barometric pressure of 985 mbar (29.09 inHg).
- 12:00 UTC (8:00 am EDT) at 12.7°N 86.2°W – Hurricane Cesar weakens into a tropical storm inland over Nicaragua.

July 29

- 00:00 UTC (7:00 pm CDT, July 28) at 13.0°N 89.7°W – Tropical Storm Cesar completes its trek across Nicaragua and becomes Tropical Storm Douglas in the Eastern Pacific basin.

=== August ===
August 19

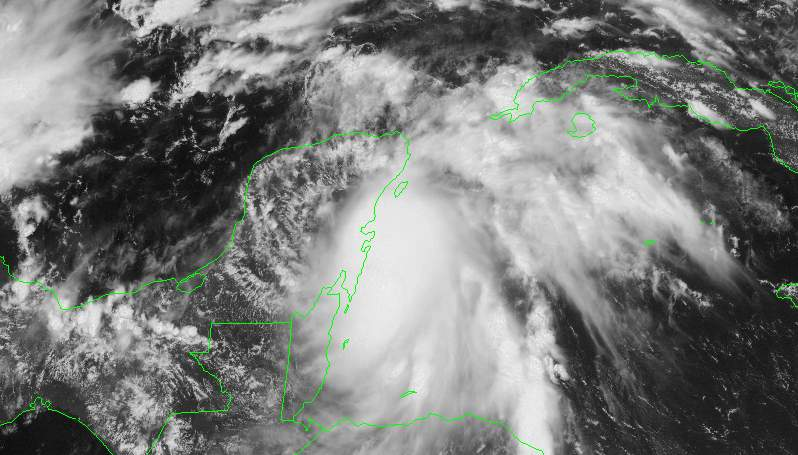
Hurricane Dolly near its landfall on the Yucatan Peninsula

- 06:00 UTC (2:00 am EDT) at 17.3°N 80.2°W – The fourth tropical depression of the season forms over the western Caribbean Sea.
- Just after 12:00 UTC (8:00 am EDT) near 17.8°N 81.7°W – The aforementioned tropical depression strengthens into Tropical Storm Dolly over the western Caribbean Sea.
- 18:00 UTC (2:00 pm AST) at 12.4°N 19.9°W – Another tropical depression, the fifth of the season, forms about 345 miles (555 km) southeast of Cape Verde.

August 20

- 17:30 UTC (12:30 CDT) at 19.1°N 87.7°W – Tropical Storm Dolly strengthens into a Category 1 hurricane as it makes its first landfall near Punta Herrero, Quintana Roo with winds of 75 mph (120 km/h) and a barometric pressure of 999 mbar (29.50 inHg).

August 21

- 00:00 UTC (7:00 pm CDT, August 20) at 19.2°N 88.7°W – Hurricane Dolly weakens into a tropical storm inland about 50 miles (85 km) north-northwest of Chetumal.
- 12:00 UTC (7:00 am CDT) at 19.4°N 90.1°W – Tropical Storm Dolly weakens into a tropical depression inland over the Yucatan Peninsula.

August 22

- 00:00 UTC (7:00 pm CDT, August 21) at 19.7°N 91.4°W – Tropical Depression Dolly restrengthens into a tropical storm over the Bay of Campeche.
- 06:00 UTC (2:00 am AST) at 13.2°N 31.6°W – The fifth tropical depression of the season strengthens into Tropical Storm Edouard about 545 miles (880 km) west-southwest of Cape Verde.

August 23

- 12:00 UTC (7:00 am CDT) at 21.6°N 97.7°W – Tropical Storm Dolly restrengthens into a Category 1 hurricane as it makes its second landfall midway between Tampico, Tamaulipas, and Tuxpan, Veracruz. It simultaneously reaches peak winds of 80 mph (130 km/h) and a minimum barometric pressure of 989 mbar (29.21 inHg).
- 12:00 UTC (8:00 am AST) at 13.9°N 38.3°W – Tropical Storm Edouard strengthens into a Category 1 hurricane about 980 miles (1,575 km) west of Cape Verde.
- 12:00 UTC (8:00 am AST) at 14.0°N 21.0°W – The sixth tropical depression of the season forms about 200 miles (325 km) southeast of Cape Verde.
- 18:00 UTC (1:00 pm CDT) at 21.6°N 99.3°W – Hurricane Dolly weakens into a tropical storm inland over central Mexico.

August 24

- 00:00 UTC (7:00 pm CDT, August 23) at 21.6°N 100.9°W – Tropical Storm Dolly weakens into a tropical depression inland over central Mexico.

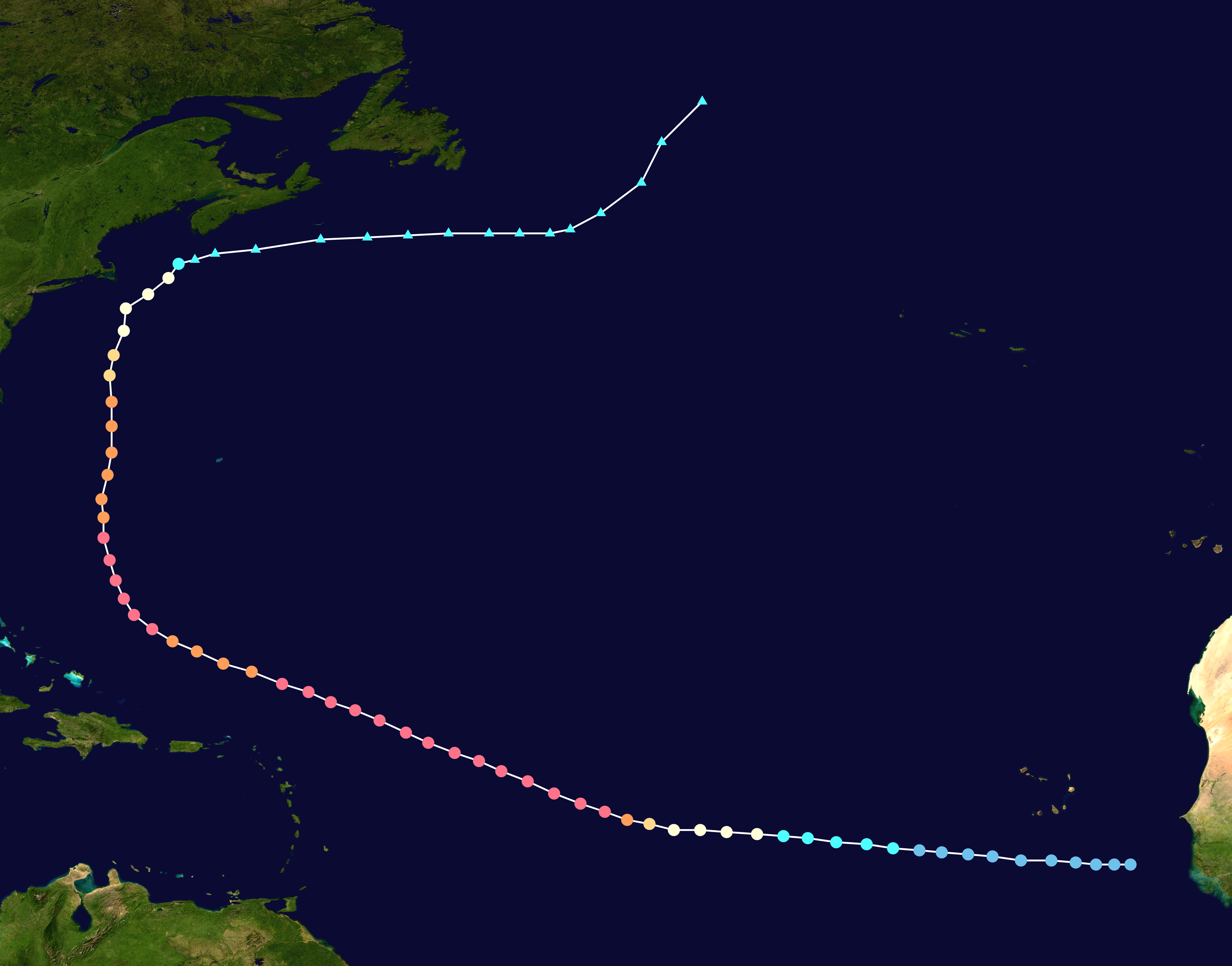
Hurricane Edouard storm path

- 12:00 UTC (8:00 am AST) at 14.4°N 43.6°W – Hurricane Edouard strengthens to Category 2 intensity about 1,330 miles (2,140 km) west of Cape Verde.
- 18:00 UTC (12:00 pm MDT) at 21.7°N 105.7°W – Tropical Depression Dolly completes its trek across Mexico and enters the Eastern Pacific basin; it dissipates 12 hours later.
- 18:00 UTC (2:00 pm AST) at 14.6°N 44.7°W – Hurricane Edouard strengthens to Category 3 intensity about 1,405 miles (2,260 km) west of Cape Verde, making it the second major hurricane of the season.

August 25

- 00:00 UTC (8:00 pm AST, August 24) at 15.0°N 45.8°W – Hurricane Edouard strengthens to Category 4 intensity about 1,475 miles (2,370 km) west of Cape Verde.
- 06:00 UTC (2:00 am AST) at 15.4°N 47.0°W – Hurricane Edouard reaches peak winds of 145 mph (230 km/h) and a minimum barometric pressure of 933 mbar (27.55 inHg) about 1,550 miles (2,490 km) west of Cape Verde, making it the strongest storm of the season.

August 26

- 00:00 UTC (8:00 pm AST, August 25) at 12.7°N 23.0°W – The seventh tropical depression of the season forms about 185 miles (295 km) south-southeast of Cape Verde.

August 27

- 12:00 UTC (8:00 am AST) at 14.6°N 44.9°W – The sixth tropical depression of the season strengthens into Tropical Storm Fran about 1,035 miles (1,665 km) east of the Lesser Antilles.

August 28

- 06:00 UTC (2:00 am AST) at 10.6°N 32.7°W – The seventh tropical depression of the season strengthens into Tropical Storm Gustav about 685 miles (1,105 km) west-southwest of Cape Verde.
- 12:00 UTC (8:00 am EDT) at 21.9°N 63.2°W – Hurricane Edouard weakens to Category 3 intensity about 725 miles (1,165 km) south of Bermuda.
- 12:00 UTC (8:00 am AST) at 11.0°N 33.6°W – Tropical Storm Gustav reaches a minimum barometric pressure of 1,005 mbar (29.68 inHg) about 720 miles (1,160 km) west-southwest of Cape Verde.

August 29

- 00:00 UTC (8:00 pm AST, August 28) at 16.4°N 53.7°W – Tropical Storm Fran strengthens into a Category 1 hurricane about 460 miles (740 km) east of the Leeward Islands.
- 00:00 UTC (8:00 pm AST, August 28) at 12.5°N 35.2°W – Tropical Storm Gustav reaches peak winds of 45 mph (75 km/h) about 795 miles (1,280 km) west-southwest of Cape Verde.
- 12:00 UTC (8:00 am EDT) at 24.0°N 68.1°W – Hurricane Edouard regains Category 4 intensity about 610 miles (980 km) south-southwest of Bermuda.

August 30

- 18:00 UTC (2:00 pm AST) at 20.2°N 60.6°W – Hurricane Fran weakens into a tropical storm about 235 miles (380 km) north-northeast of the Leeward Islands.

August 31

- 00:00 UTC (8:00 pm EDT, August 30) at 29.5°N 70.5°W – Hurricane Edouard weakens back to Category 3 intensity about 390 miles (630 km) west-southwest of Bermuda.
- 12:00 UTC (8:00 am AST) at 21.1°N 61.4°W – Tropical Storm Fran restrengthens into a Category 1 hurricane about 275 miles (445 km) north-northeast of the Leeward Islands.

=== September ===
September 1

- 12:00 UTC (8:00 am EDT) at 36.5°N 70.2°W – Hurricane Edouard weakens to Category 2 intensity about 310 miles (500 km) east-northeast of Cape Hatteras, North Carolina.
- 18:00 UTC (2:00 pm AST) at 20.0°N 46.5°W – Tropical Storm Gustav weakens into a tropical depression about 1,535 miles (2,475 km) west of Cape Verde; it dissipates 12 hours later.

September 2

- 00:00 UTC (8:00 pm EDT, September 1) at 38.7°N 69.5°W – Hurricane Edouard weakens to Category 1 intensity about 180 miles (285 km) south of Nantucket, Massachusetts.

September 3

- 00:00 UTC (8:00 pm EDT, September 2) at 42.0°N 66.8°W – Hurricane Edouard weakens into a tropical storm about 180 miles (285 km) east-northeast of Nantucket, Massachusetts.
- 06:00 UTC (2:00 am EDT) at 42.2°N 66.0°W – Tropical Storm Edouard becomes extratropical about 220 miles (350 km) east-northeast of Nantucket, Massachusetts.
- 12:00 UTC (8:00 am AST) at 14.9°N 41.0°W – The eighth tropical depression of the season forms about 1,150 miles (1,855 km) west of Cape Verde.
- 18:00 UTC (2:00 pm EDT) at 25.2°N 72.2°W – Hurricane Fran strengthens to Category 2 intensity while paralleling the Bahamas just over 115 miles (185 km) to the east.

September 4

Hurricane Fran at peak intensity

- 06:00 UTC (2:00 am EDT) at 26.4°N 73.9°W – Hurricane Fran strengthens to Category 3 intensity northeast of the central Bahamas, making it the third major hurricane of the season.
- 12:00 UTC (8:00 am EDT) at 27.0°N 74.7°W – Hurricane Fran reaches peak winds of 120 mph (195 km/h) northeast of the central Bahamas.

September 5

- 00:00 UTC (8:00 pm EDT, September 4) at 28.6°N 76.1°W – Hurricane Fran reaches a minimum barometric pressure of 946 mbar (27.94 inHg) about 290 miles (465 km) offshore the east coast of Florida.

September 6

- 00:30 UTC (8:30 pm EDT, September 5) at 33.9°N 78.0°W – Hurricane Fran makes landfall near Cape Fear, North Carolina with winds of 115 mph (185 km/h) and a barometric pressure of 954 mbar (28.17 inHg).
- 06:00 UTC (2:00 am EDT) at 35.2°N 78.7°W – Hurricane Fran rapidly weakens to Category 1 intensity inland over North Carolina.
- 12:00 UTC (8:00 am EDT) at 36.7°N 79.0°W – Hurricane Fran weakens into a tropical storm inland over North Carolina and Virginia.
- 18:00 UTC (2:00 pm EDT) at 38.0°N 79.4°W – Tropical Storm Fran weakens into a tropical depression inland over Virginia.

September 7

- 06:00 UTC (2:00 am AST) at 15.4°N 58.3°W – The eighth tropical depression of the season strengthens into Tropical Storm Hortense about 220 miles (350 km) east of Guadeloupe.

September 9

- 00:00 UTC (8:00 pm EDT, September 8) at 44.9°N 75.9°W – Tropical Depression Fran becomes extratropical over southern Ontario.

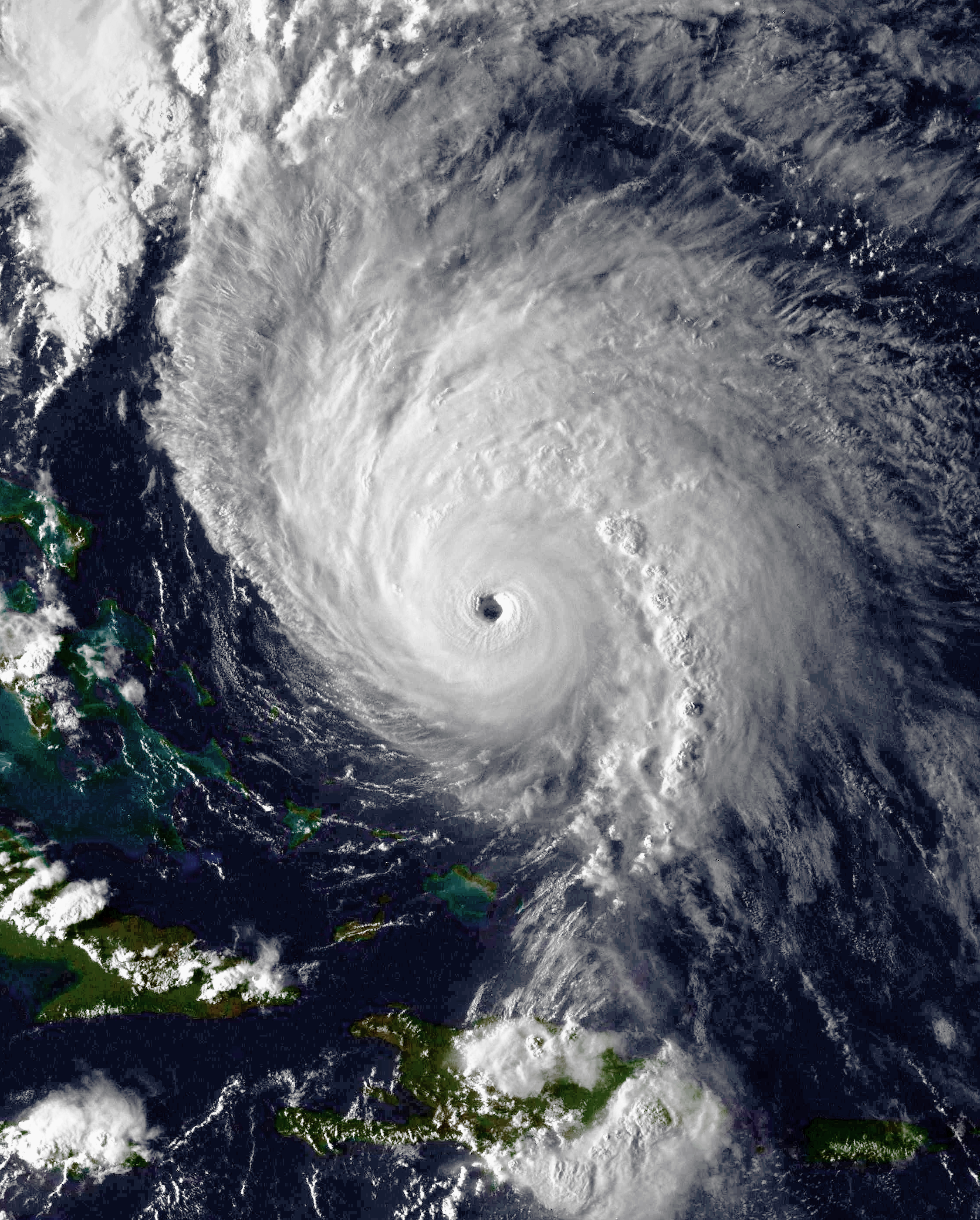
Hurricane Hortense near peak intensity

- 06:00 UTC (2:00 am AST) at 16.1°N 64.5°W – Tropical Storm Hortense strengthens into a Category 1 hurricane over the eastern Caribbean Sea.

September 10

- 06:00 UTC (2:00 am EDT) at 18.0°N 66.9°W – Hurricane Hortense makes its first landfall near Guánica, Puerto Rico with winds of 80 mph (130 km/h) and a barometric pressure of 989 mbar (29.21 inHg).

September 11

- 12:00 UTC (8:00 am EDT) at 20.9°N 70.1°W – Hurricane Hortense strengthens to Category 2 intensity about 125 miles (205 km) east-southeast of the Turks and Caicos Islands.

September 12

- 00:00 UTC (8:00 pm EDT, September 11) at 22.3°N 71.1°W – Hurricane Hortense strengthens to Category 3 intensity about 60 miles (95 km) northeast of the Turks and Caicos Islands, making it the fourth major hurricane of the season.
- 12:00 UTC (8:00 am EDT) at 23.9°N 71.8°W – Hurricane Hortense strengthens to Category 4 intensity about 145 miles (230 km) north of the Turks and Caicos Islands.

September 13

- 00:00 UTC (8:00 pm EDT, September 12) at 25.9°N 71.5°W – Hurricane Hortense reaches peak winds of 140 mph (220 km/h) and a minimum barometric pressure of 935 mbar (27.61 inHg) about 290 miles (465 km) north of the Turks and Caicos Islands.
- 12:00 UTC (8:00 am EDT) at 29.0°N 70.9°W – Hurricane Hortense weakens to Category 3 intensity about 500 miles (805 km) north of the Turks and Caicos Islands.

September 14

- 00:00 UTC (8:00 pm EDT, September 13) at 33.3°N 69.5°W – Hurricane Hortense weakens to Category 2 intensity about 805 miles (1,295 km) north of the Turks and Caicos Islands.
- 18:00 UTC (2:00 pm AST) at 42.0°N 65.2°W – Hurricane Hortense weakens to Category 1 intensity just south of Nova Scotia.

September 15

- 03:00 UTC (11:00 pm AST, September 14) at 44.8°N 62.5°W – Hurricane Hortense makes its second landfall over eastern Nova Scotia with winds of 80 mph (130 km/h) and a barometric pressure of 978 mbar (28.88 inHg).
- 12:00 UTC (8:00 am AST) at 46.3°N 59.1°W – Hurricane Hortense weakens into a tropical storm just east of Nova Scotia.
- 18:00 UTC (2:00 pm AST) at 46.0°N 55.0°W – Tropical Storm Hortense becomes extratropical just south of Newfoundland.

September 24

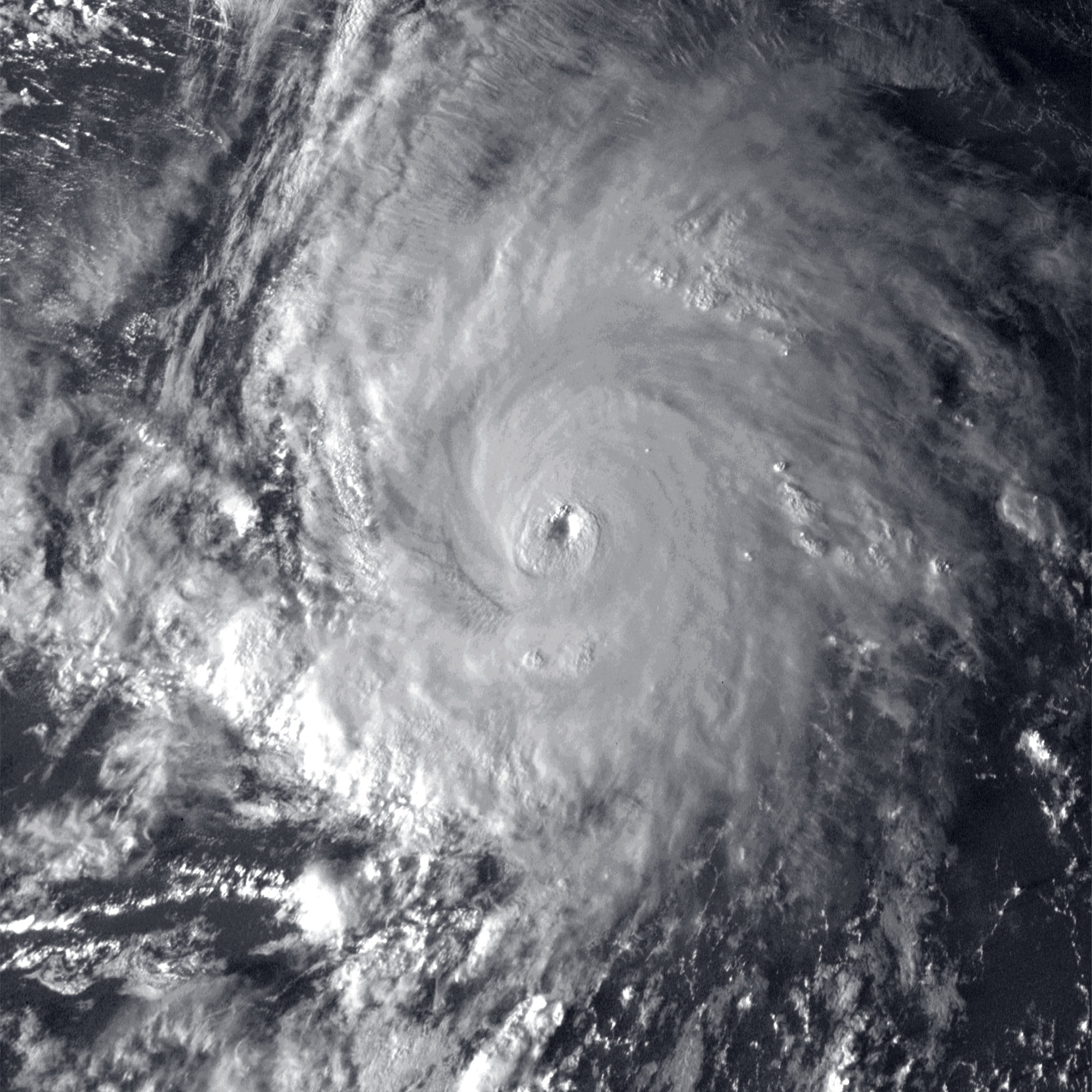
Hurricane Isidore near peak intensity

- 12:00 UTC (8:00 am AST) at 8.6°N 23.3°W – The ninth tropical depression of the season forms about 465 miles (750 km) south of Cape Verde.

September 25

- 06:00 UTC (2:00 am AST) at 10.3°N 28.5°W – The ninth tropical depression of the season strengthens into Tropical Storm Isidore about 470 miles (760 km) southwest of Cape Verde.

September 26

- 06:00 UTC (2:00 am AST) at 11.7°N 34.2°W – Tropical Storm Isidore strengthens into a Category 1 hurricane about 750 miles (1,205 km) west-southwest of Cape Verde.

September 27

- 06:00 UTC (2:00 am AST) at 13.7°N 39.8°W – Hurricane Isidore strengthens to Category 2 intensity about 1,080 miles (1,740 km) west of Cape Verde.

September 28

- 00:00 UTC (8:00 pm AST, September 27) at 15.8°N 42.9°W – Hurricane Isidore strengthens to Category 3 intensity about 1,280 miles (2,055 km) west of Cape Verde, making it the season's fifth major hurricane. It simultaneously reaches peak winds of 115 mph (185 km/h) and a minimum barometric pressure of 960 mbar (28.35 inHg).
- 12:00 UTC (8:00 am AST) at 17.8°N 43.2°W – Hurricane Isidore weakens to Category 2 intensity about 1,135 miles (1,825 km) west of Cape Verde.

September 29

- 06:00 UTC (2:00 am AST) at 20.8°N 42.2°W – Hurricane Isidore weakens to Category 1 intensity about 1,270 miles (2,050 km) west-northwest of Cape Verde.

September 30

- 00:00 UTC (8:00 pm AST, September 29) at 23.8°N 40.4°W – Hurricane Isidore weakens into a tropical storm about 1,230 miles (1,985 km) west-northwest of Cape Verde.

=== October ===
October 1

- 12:00 UTC (8:00 am AST) at 33.6°N 40.4°W – Tropical Storm Isidore weakens into a tropical depression over the northeastern Atlantic basin.

October 2

- 00:00 UTC (8:00 pm AST, October 1) at 38.1°N 40.1°W – Tropical Depression Isidore transitions into an extratropical cyclone.

October 4

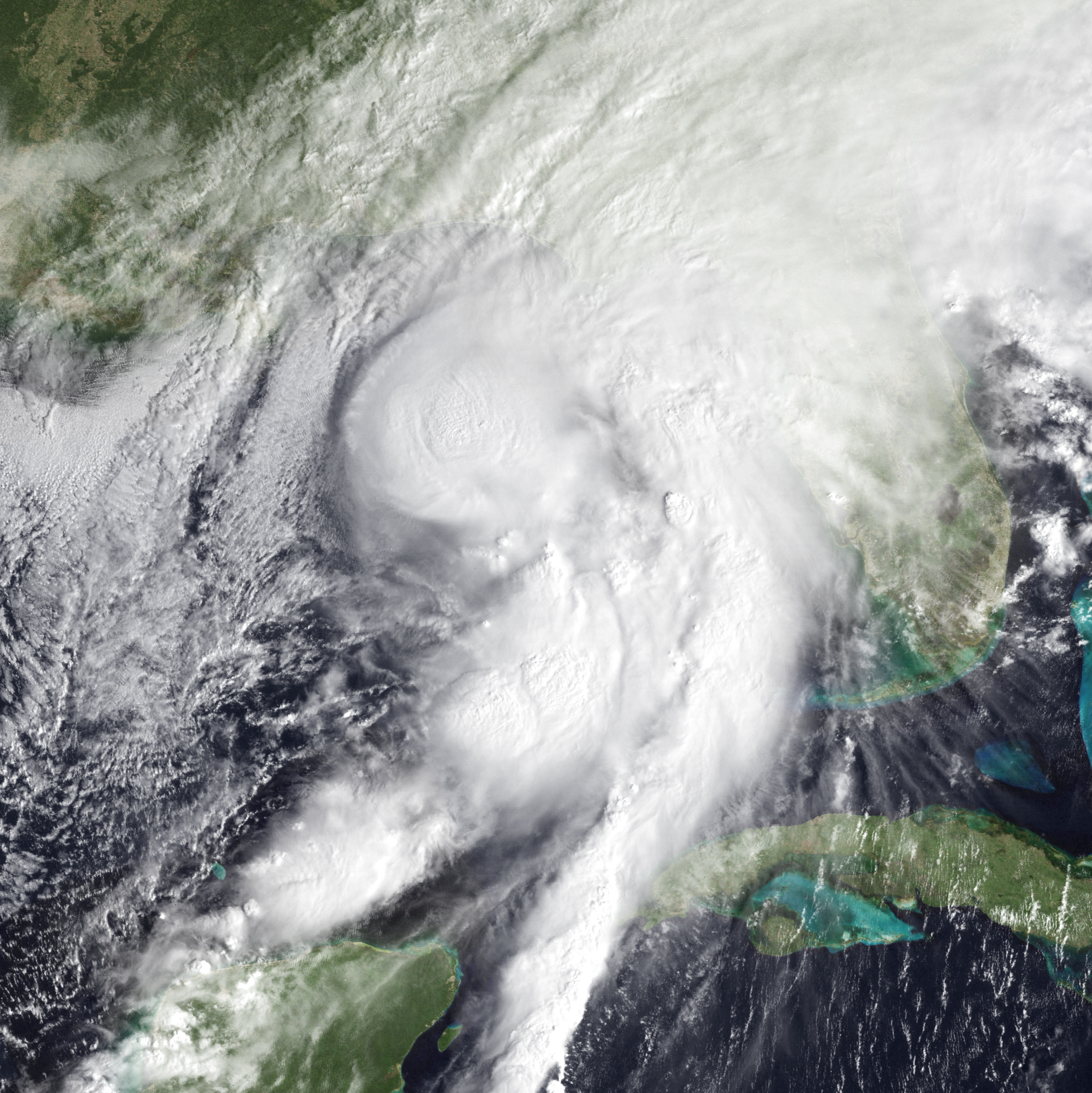
Tropical Storm Josephine at peak intensity

- 18:00 UTC (1:00 pm CDT) at 22.7°N 96.2°W – Tropical Depression Ten forms over the western Gulf of Mexico.

October 6

- 18:00 UTC (1:00 pm CDT) at 25.1°N 91.8°W – Tropical Depression Ten strengthens into Tropical Storm Josephine.

October 7

- 12:00 UTC (7:00 am CDT) at 26.9°N 87.3°W – Tropical Storm Josephine reaches peak winds of 70 mph (110 km/h) and a minimum barometric pressure of 981 mbar (28.97 inHg) over the northeastern Gulf of Mexico.

October 8

- 03:30 UTC (11:30 pm EDT, October 7) at 30.0°N 83.9°W – Tropical Storm Josephine makes landfall in Taylor County, Florida, between Dekle Beach and St. Marks, with winds of 70 mph (110 km/h) and a barometric pressure of 983 mbar (29.03 inHg).
- 06:00 UTC (2:00 am EDT) at 30.9°N 82.3°W – Tropical Storm Josephine becomes extratropical as it begins to move over Georgia.

October 11

- 12:00 UTC (8:00 am EDT) at 17.3°N 86.5°W – The eleventh tropical depression of the season forms about midway between the coast of Belize and the Swan Islands .
- 18:00 UTC (2:00 pm EDT) at 16.9°N 87.1°W – The tropical depression strengthens into Tropical Storm Kyle and simultaneously reaches peak winds of 50 mph (85 km/h) over the Gulf of Honduras.
- 21:00 UTC (5:00 pm EDT) at 16.7°N 87.4°W – Tropical Storm Kyle reaches a minimum barometric pressure of 1,002 mbar (29.59 inHg).

October 12

- 12:00 UTC (7:00 am CDT) at 16.0°N 88.1°W – Tropical Storm Kyle weakens into a tropical depression just offshore the Guatemala/Honduras border.
- 18:00 UTC (1:00 pm CDT) at 15.7°N 88.4°W – Tropical Depression Kyle makes landfall near the Guatemala/Honduras border with winds of 30 mph (45 km/h) and a barometric pressure of 1,012 mbar (29.88 inHg). It dissipates near this area six hours later.

October 14

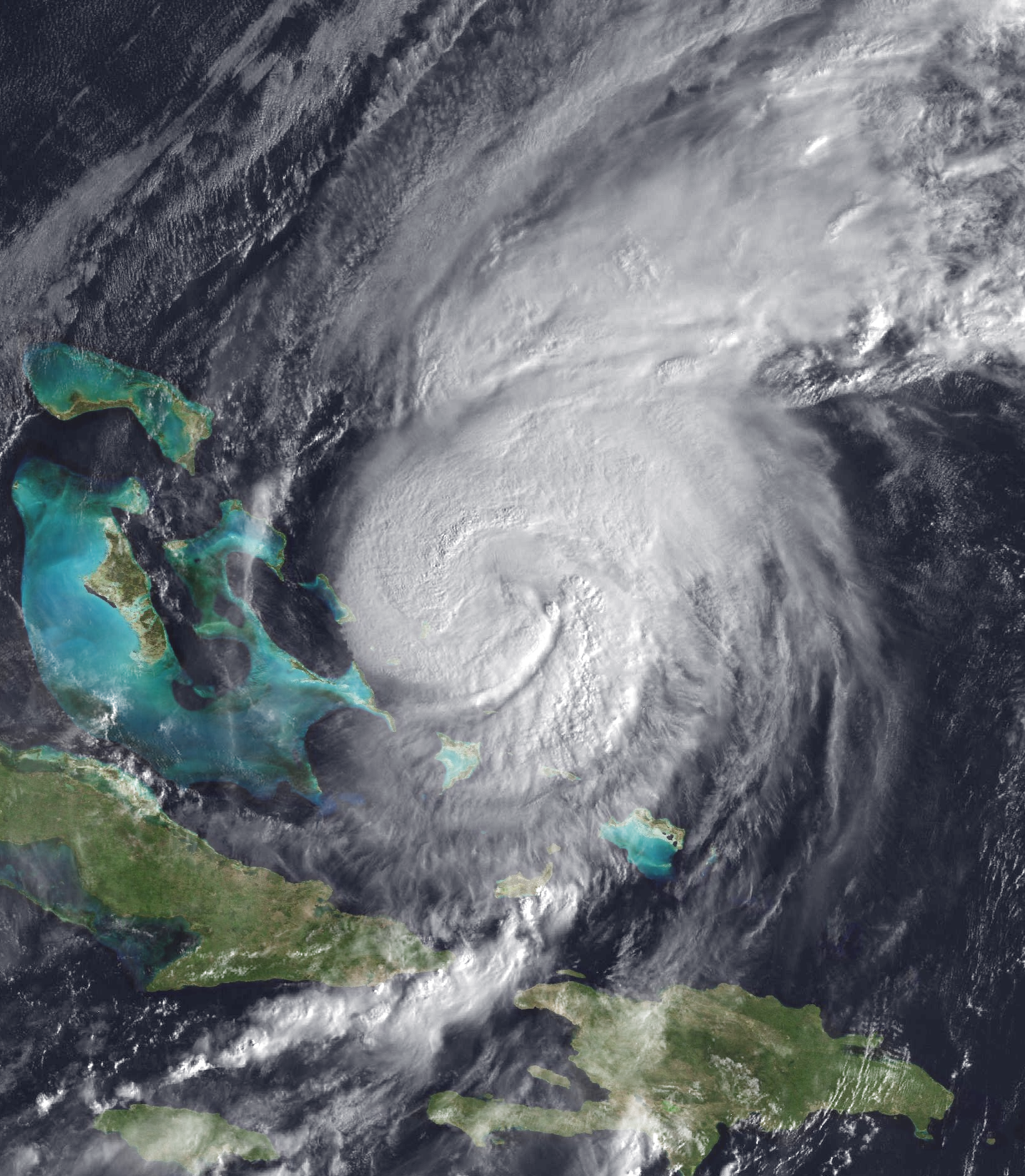
Hurricane Lili at peak intensity

- 12:00 UTC (8:00 am EDT) at 12.8°N 80.4°W – The twelfth tropical depression of the season forms east of Nicaragua.

October 16

- 06:00 UTC (2:00 am EDT) at 17.5°N 83.8°W – The tropical depression strengthens into Tropical Storm Lili near the Swan Islands.

October 17

- 12:00 UTC (8:00 am EDT) at 19.6°N 83.5°W – Tropical Storm Lili strengthens into a Category 1 hurricane about 130 miles (215 km) south of the Isle of Youth.

October 18

- 09:30 UTC (5:30 am EDT) at 22.3°N 82.0°W – Hurricane Lili strengthens to Category 2 intensity. It simultaneously makes landfall on the Zapata Peninsula of Cuba with winds of 100 mph (155 km/h) and a barometric pressure of 975 mbar (28.79 inHg).
- 18:00 UTC (2:00 pm EDT) at 22.5°N 80.0°W – Hurricane Lili weakens to Category 1 intensity over Cuba.

October 19

- 00:00 UTC (8:00 pm EDT, October 18) at 23.0°N 78.2°W – Having re-emerged over water, Hurricane Lili regains Category 2 intensity about 145 miles (230 km) west-southwest of Great Exuma.
- 12:00 UTC (8:00 am EDT) at 24.4°N 74.0°W – Hurricane Lili strengthens to Category 3 intensity about 35 miles (55 km) northeast of San Salvador Island, making it the sixth major hurricane of the season. It simultaneously reaches peak winds of 115 mph (185 km/h) and a minimum barometric pressure of 960 mbar (28.35 inHg).
- 18:00 UTC (2:00 pm EDT) at 25.5°N 71.5°W – Hurricane Lili weakens back to Category 2 intensity about 215 miles (345 km) east-northeast of San Salvador Island.

October 20

- 00:00 UTC (8:00 pm EDT, October 19) at 26.9°N 69.0°W – Hurricane Lili weakens to Category 1 intensity about 390 miles (630 km) east-northeast of San Salvador Island.

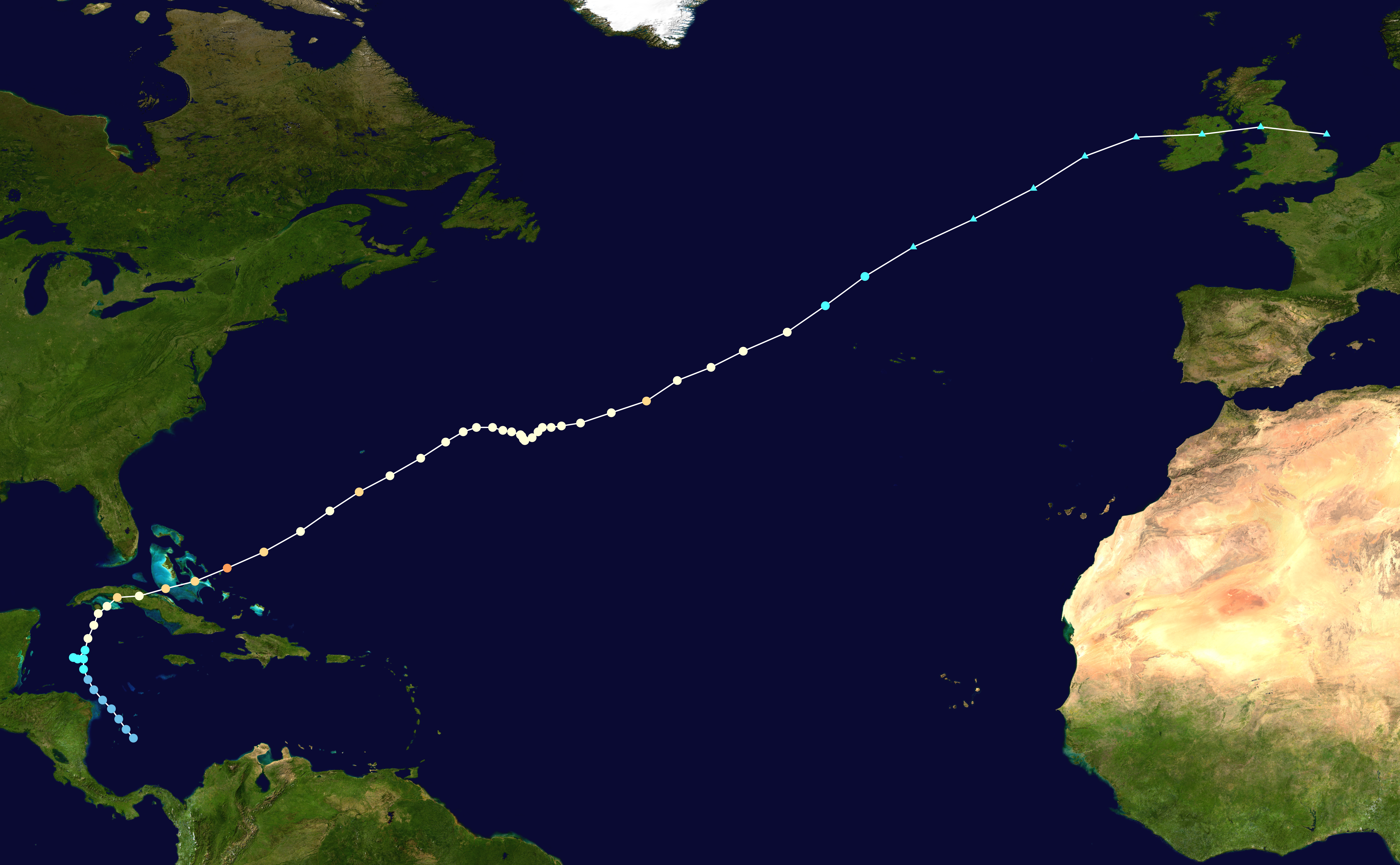
Hurricane Lili storm path

- 12:00 UTC (8:00 am AST) at 29.6°N 65.0°W – Hurricane Lili again regains Category 2 intensity about 190 miles (305 km) south of Bermuda.
- 18:00 UTC (2:00 pm AST) at 30.7°N 62.9°W – Hurricane Lili weakens back to Category 1 intensity about 155 miles (250 km) southeast of Bermuda.

October 25

- 12:00 UTC (8:00 am AST) at 35.8°N 45.4°W – Hurricane Lili regains Category 2 intensity for a final time about 975 miles (1,565 km) west-southwest of the Azores.
- 18:00 UTC (2:00 pm AST) at 37.2°N 43.3°W – Hurricane Lili weakens to Category 1 intensity about 835 miles (1,345 km) west of the Azores.

October 26

- 18:00 UTC (2:00 pm AST) at 42.3°N 33.2°W – Hurricane Lili weakens into a tropical storm about 370 miles (595 km) northwest of the Azores.

October 27

- 06:00 UTC (2:00 am AST) at 46.3°N 27.2°W – Tropical Storm Lili becomes extratropical about 530 miles (850 km) north of the Azores.

=== November ===
November 16

- 18:00 UTC (1:00 pm EST) at 17.0°N 79.0°W – The thirteenth tropical depression of the season forms southwest of Jamaica.

November 19

- 06:00 UTC (1:00 am EST) at 13.8°N 80.9°W – The tropical depression strengthens into Tropical Storm Marco over the western Caribbean Sea, off the coast of Central America.

November 20

Hurricane Marco in the Caribbean Sea

- 06:00 UTC (1:00 am EST) at 13.8°N 78.5°W – Tropical Storm Marco strengthens into a Category 1 hurricane well to the south of Jamaica. It simultaneously reaches peak winds of 75 mph (120 km/h) and a minimum barometric pressure of 983 mbar (29.03 inHg).
- 18:00 UTC (1:00 pm EST) at 14.6°N 77.4°W – Hurricane Marco weakens into a tropical storm.

November 23

- 18:00 UTC (1:00 pm EST) at 15.6°N 74.8°W – Tropical Storm Marco weakens into a tropical depression southeast of Jamaica.

November 24

- 12:00 UTC (7:00 am EST) at 16.0°N 78.0°W – Tropical Depression Marco restrengthens into a tropical storm south of Jamaica.

November 26

- 12:00 UTC (7:00 am EST) at 20.1°N 84.3°W – Tropical Storm Marco weakens into a tropical depression about 125 miles (205 km) south-southeast of the Guanahacabibes Peninsula of Cuba.
- 18:00 UTC (1:00 pm EST) at 19.6°N 84.8°W – Tropical Depression Marco dissipates about 155 miles (250 km) south of the Guanahacabibes Peninsula.

November 30

- The 1996 Atlantic hurricane season officially ends.

== See also ==
- Timeline of the 1996 Pacific hurricane season
- Lists of Atlantic hurricanes
- Tropical cyclones in 1996
