= Surf City Pier =

Fishing pier in Surf City, North Carolina

Coordinates: 34°25′26″N 77°32′40″W

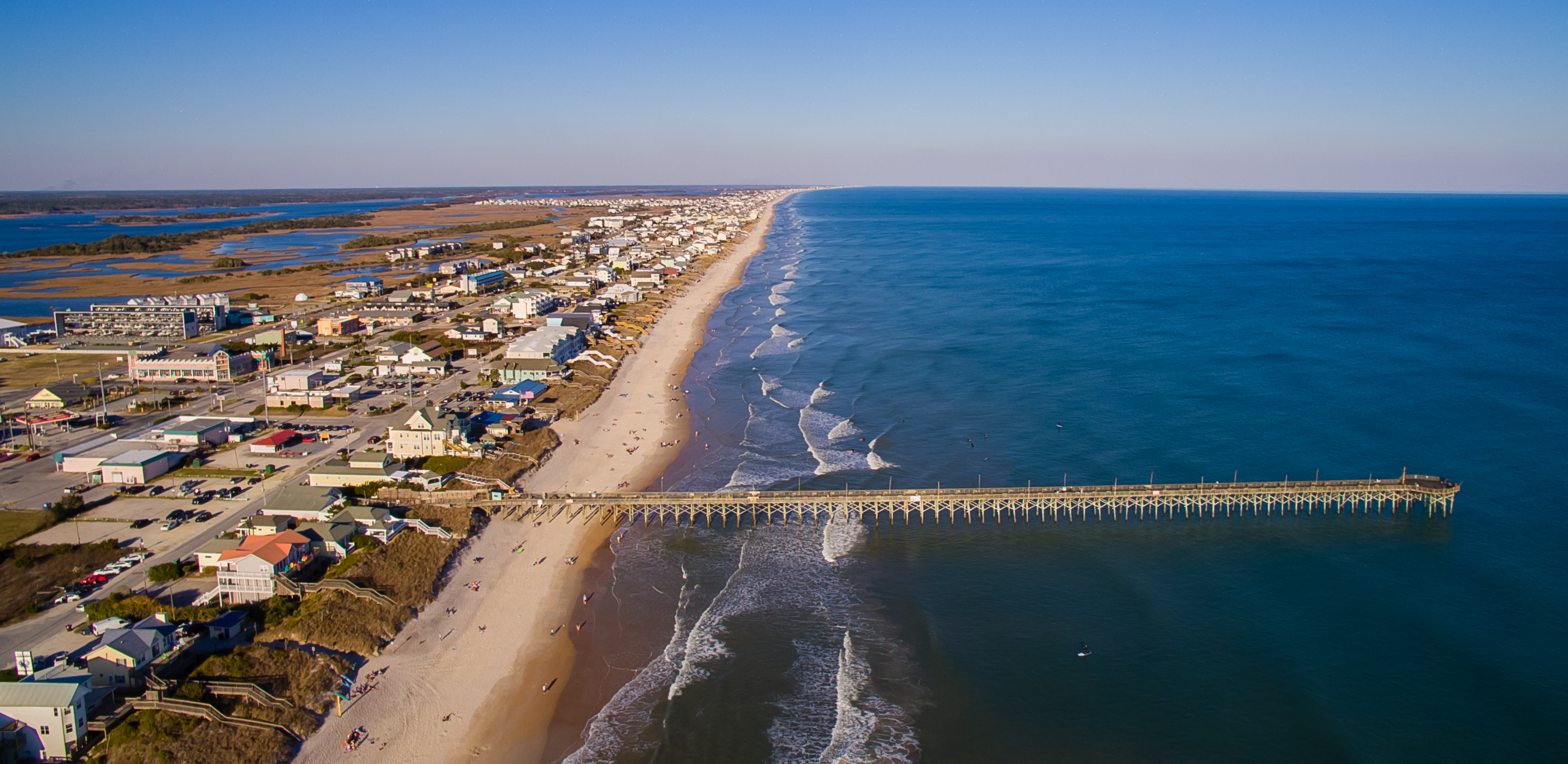
The Pier from above

The Surf City Pier is a fishing pier located in Surf City, North Carolina, United States, at 112 S Shore Drive. At 937 feet (286 m) in length, it is the only remaining Pier in Surf City. Previously, the pier contained an 40 feet (12 m) octagon at the end and two fish cleaning stations are located on its decks. The pier is one of the local attractions for both visitors and residents.

== History ==
The pier was originally built in 1948. The pier was purchased by the Lore family in 1973. The pier has been damaged by several hurricanes, including Hurricane Gloria in 1985, Hurricanes Bertha, Edouard, and Fran in 1996, the latter of which destroyed the pier, and Hurricane Florence in 2018. The current version was rebuilt and reopened in 1997. A 150-foot section, including the octagon was damaged during Hurricane Florence in 2018. Rebuilding began in early 2019, but the remainder of the pier is open.

== Uses and features ==
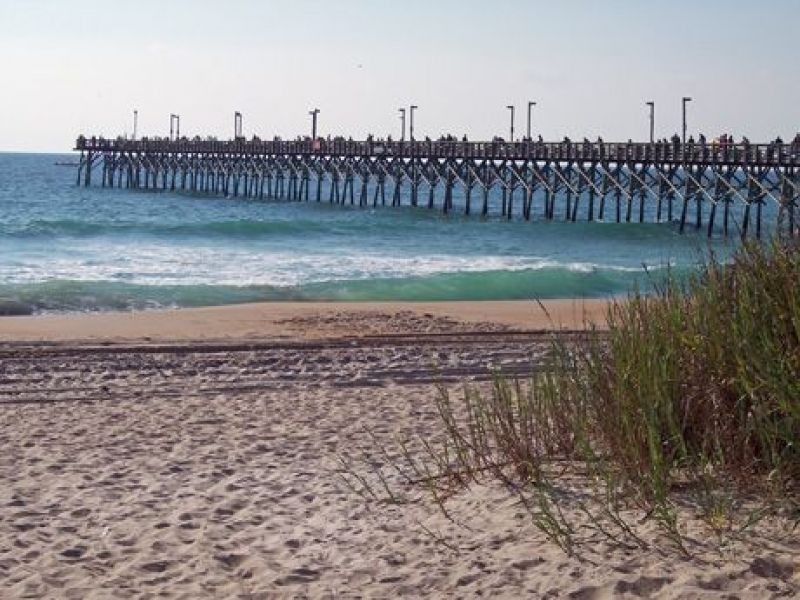
Surf City Pier

The pier is used primarily by fishermen, as well as spectators. The pier is open mid-March through December 1, 24 hours a day, seven days a week. The pier has lights for night fishing, fish cleaning stations and several benches. The attached building has bait and tackle, souvenirs, a grill and ice cream. The pier is often used for photographers to capture shots of the local surfers.

== Prices and fees ==
The pier has daily and seasonal passes available. 24-hour fishing passes are $10 per rod for those over 11 years old and $5 per rod for those 10 and younger. 2019 seasonal rates are $325 per person for up to 2 rods and $650 for 2 people, up to 2 rods. Spectators can also walk on the pier and observe for $1 per day, per person. Spectator seasonal rates are $30 per person or $50 per family.

== Gallery ==
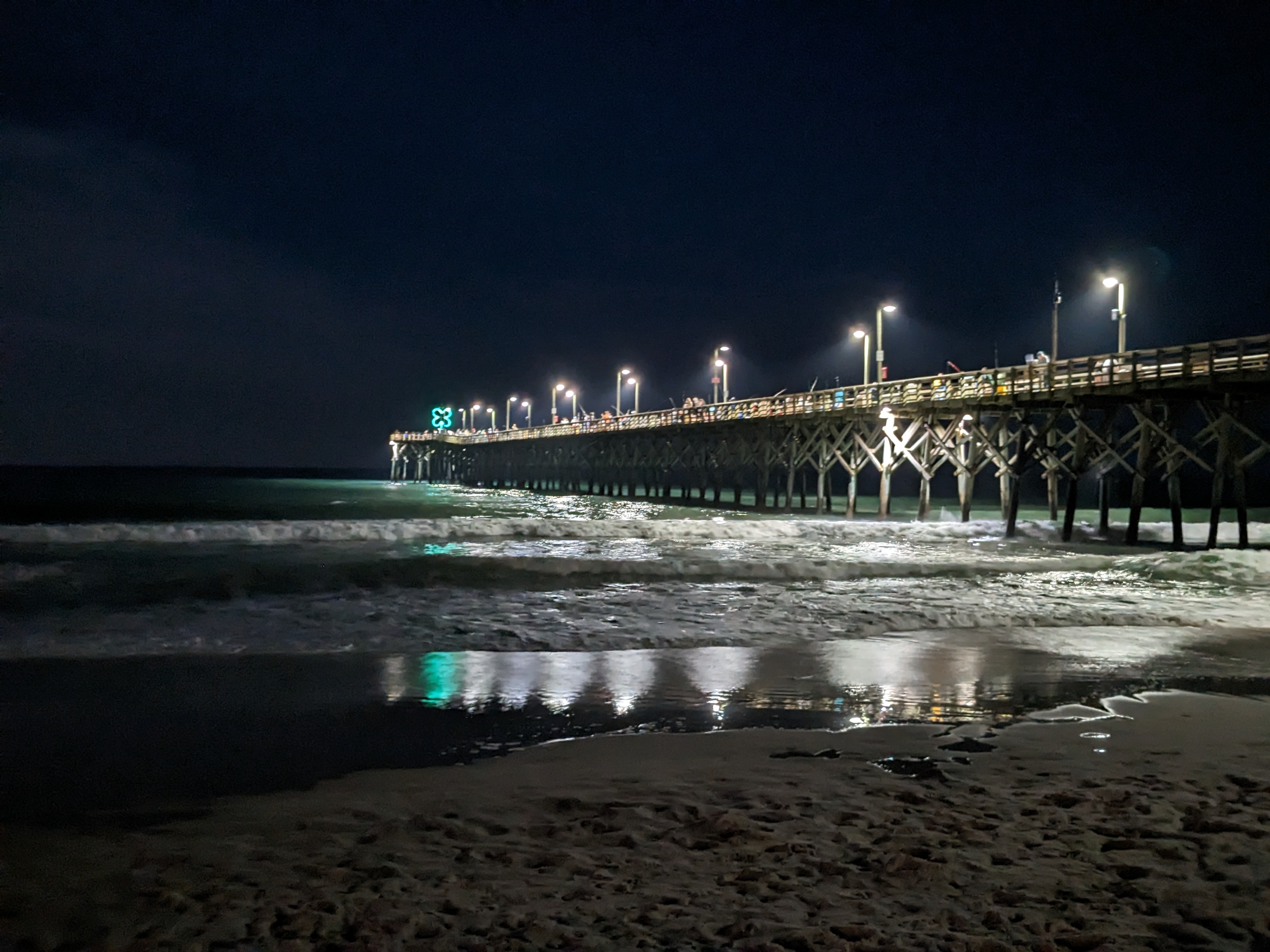
Surf City Pier at night, showing people fishing at night

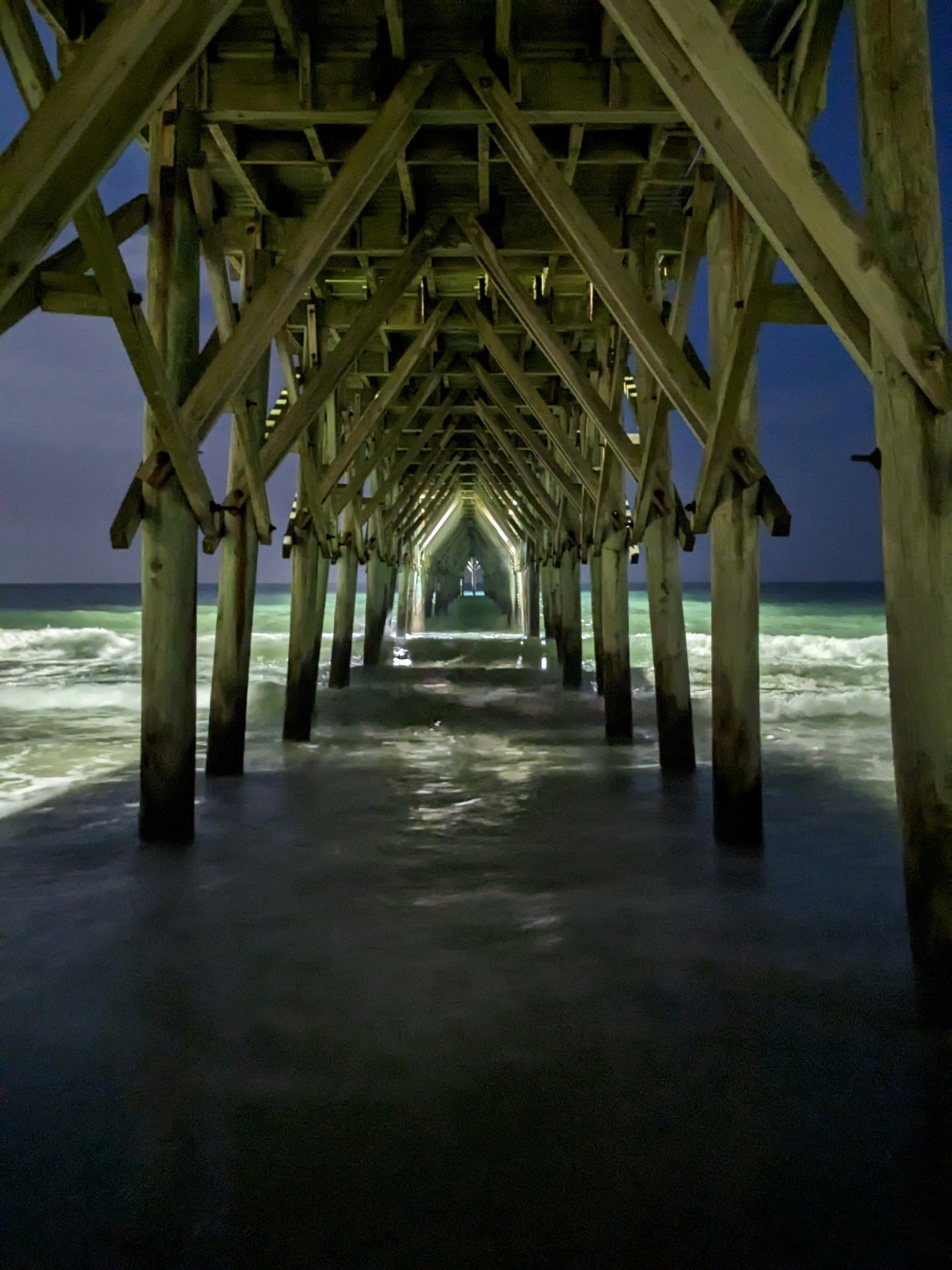
underneath the Surf City Pier at night

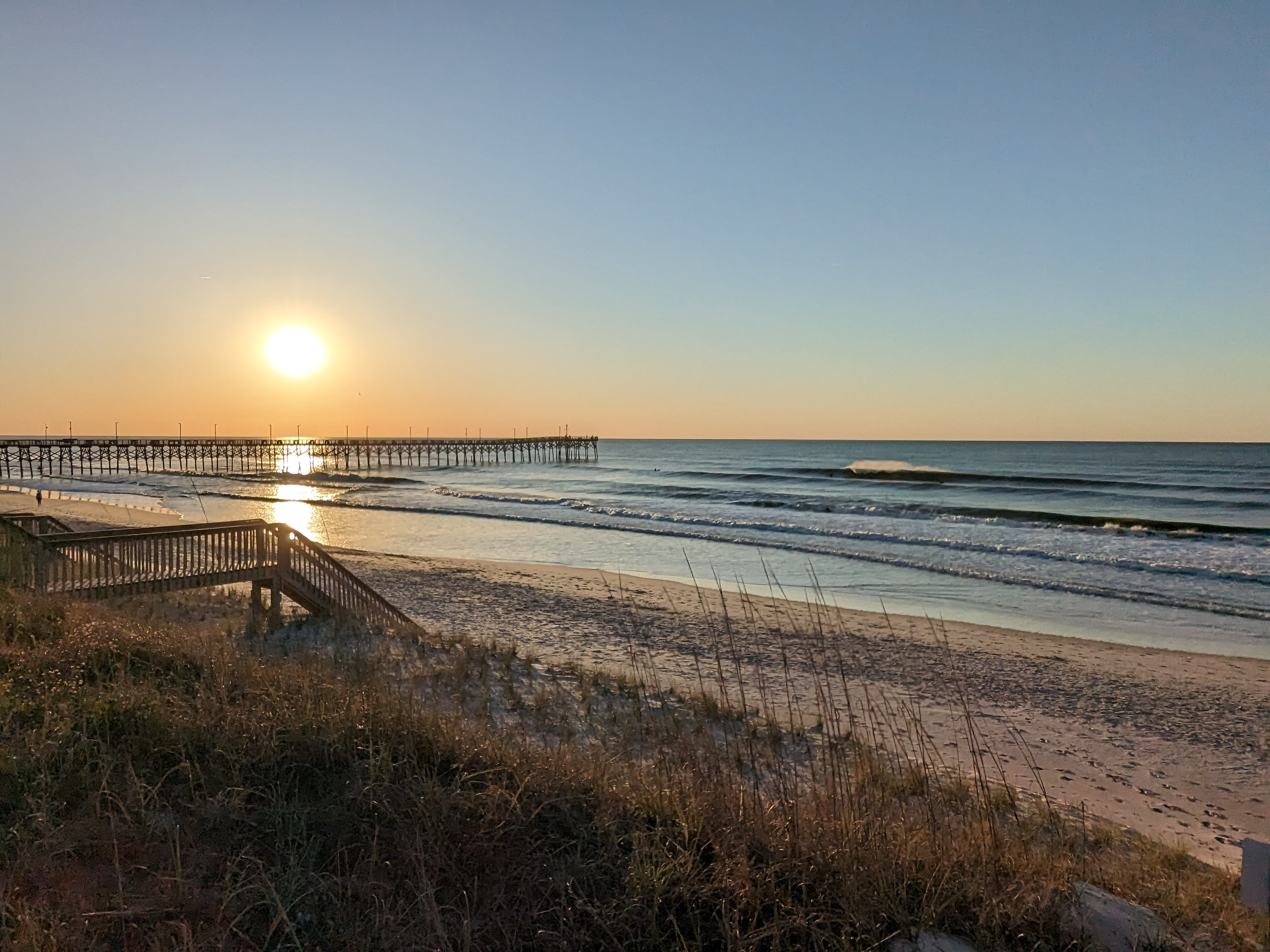
Surf City Pier at sunrise

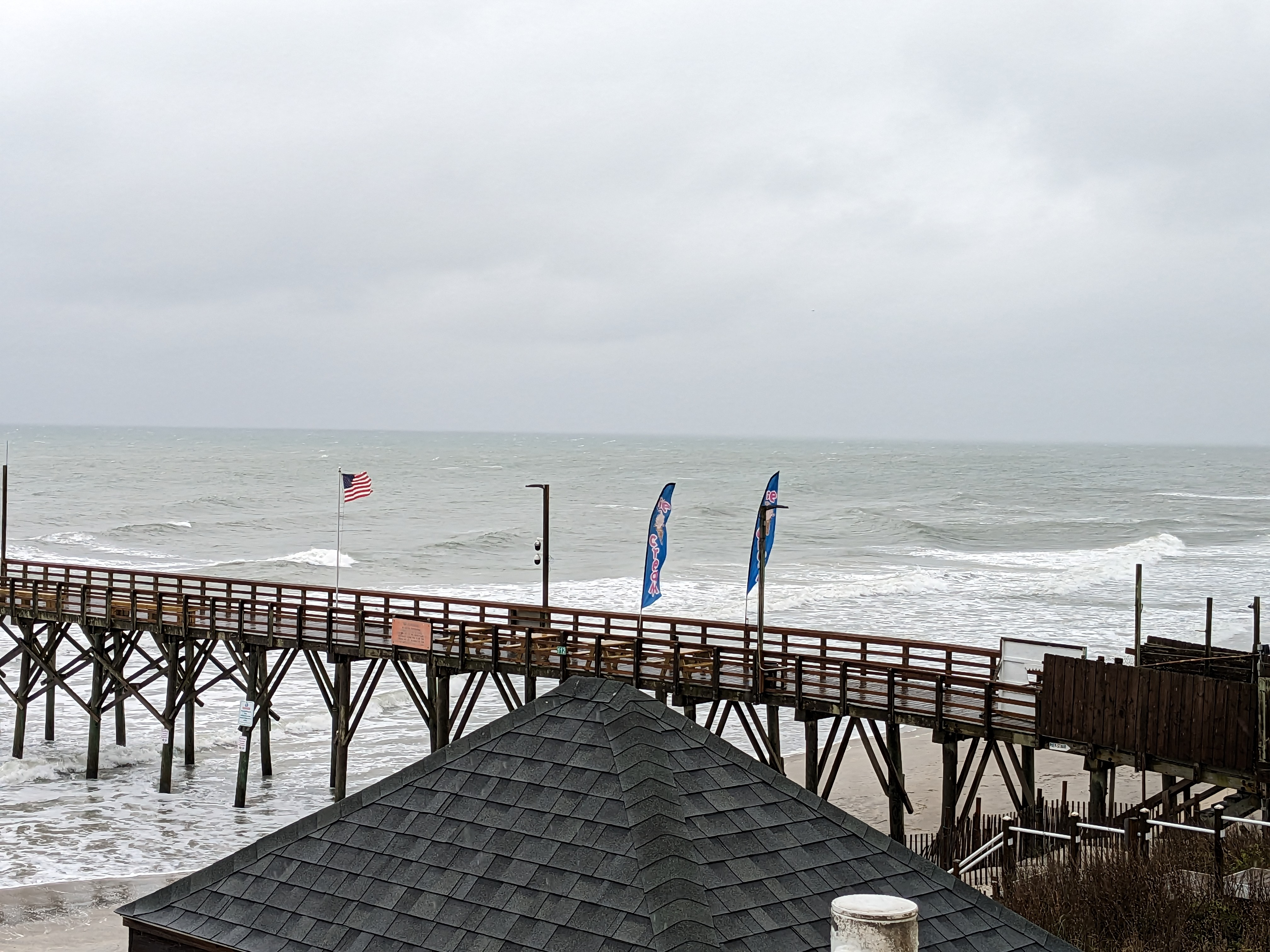
The entry to Surf City Pier

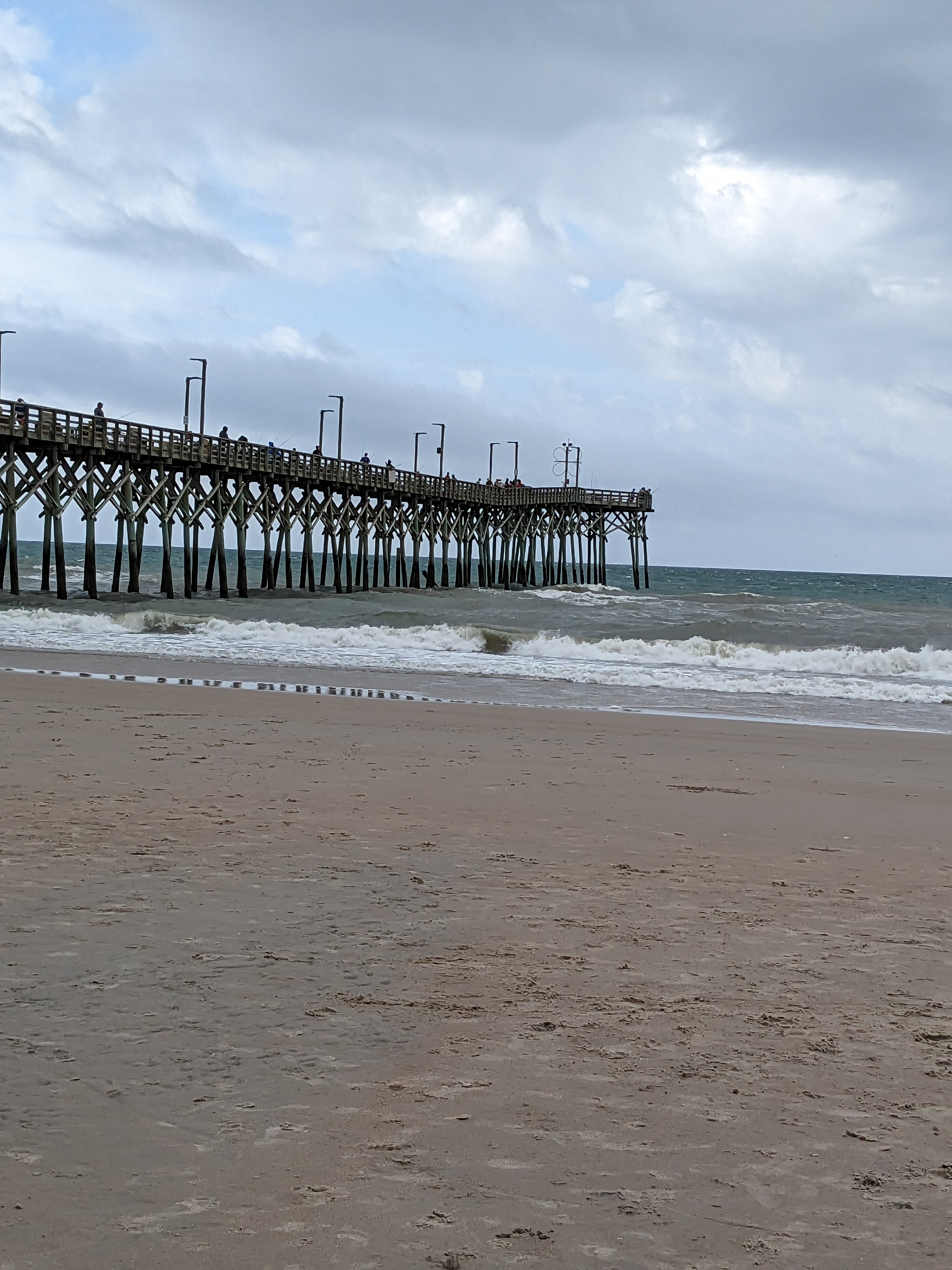
Surf City Pier from the right side

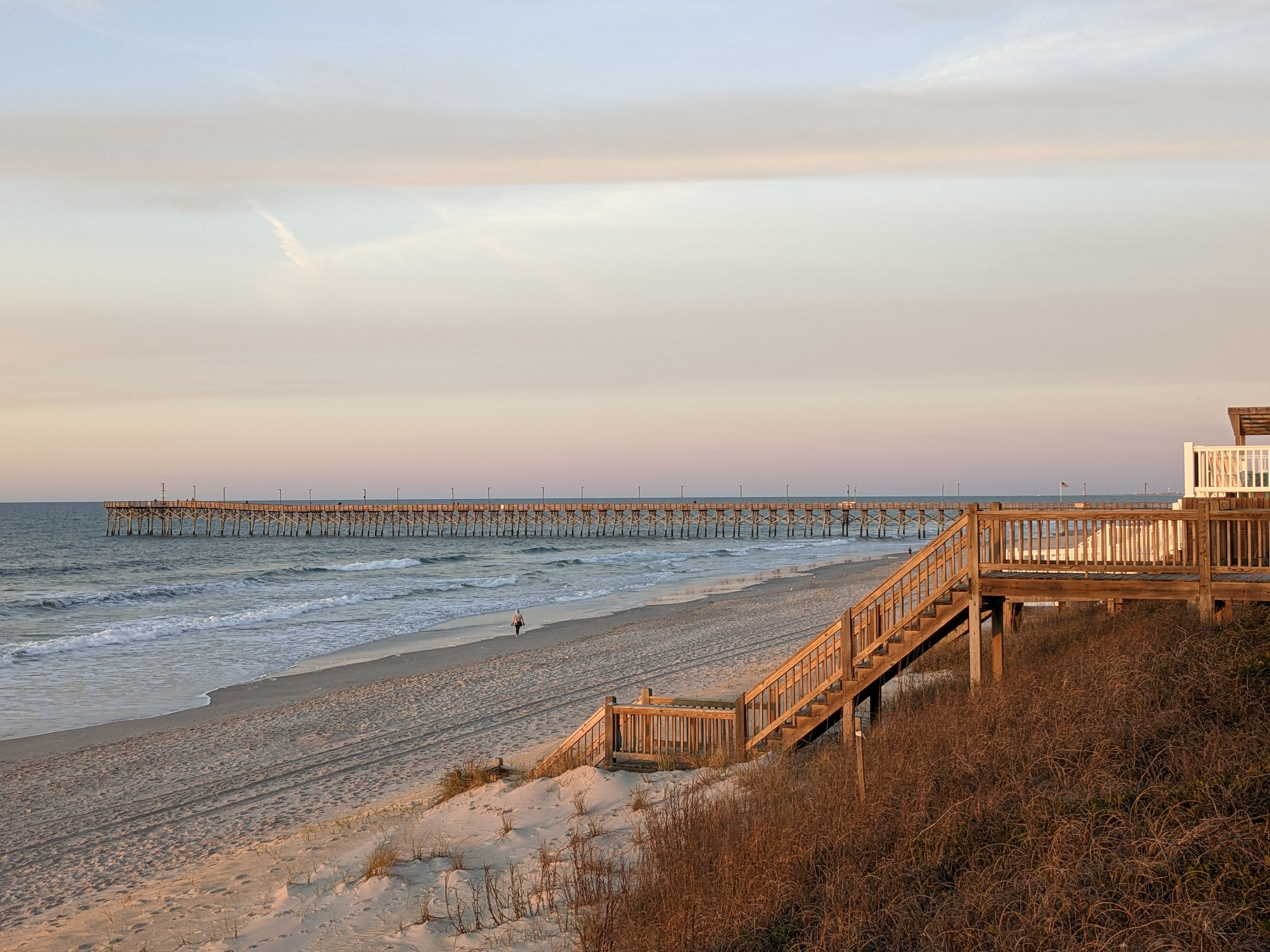
Surf City Pier from the left side
