= List of storms named Edouard =

The name Edouard has been used for eight tropical cyclones in the Atlantic Ocean.

- Tropical Storm Edouard (1984), a tropical storm that rapidly formed and strengthened in the Bay of Campeche
- Tropical Storm Edouard (1990), a tropical storm that caused minor damage in the Azores
- Hurricane Edouard (1996), a powerful category 4 hurricane that impacted New England and Atlantic Canada but remained offshore
- Tropical Storm Edouard (2002), a tropical storm that crossed west over Florida
- Tropical Storm Edouard (2008), a tropical storm that made landfall in Texas
- Hurricane Edouard (2014), a Category 3 hurricane that churned in the open ocean
- Tropical Storm Edouard (2020), a tropical storm that briefly affected Bermuda
- Tropical Storm Edouard (2026), a tropical storm that made landfall in the southwest corner of Louisiana
