= Tropical Storm Edouard (2008) =

Atlantic tropical storm in 2008

- Tropical Storm Edouard near peak intensity on August 4

Meteorological history
- Formed: August 3, 2008
- Dissipated: August 6, 2008

Tropical storm
- 1-minute sustained (SSHWS/NWS)
- Highest winds: 65 mph (100 km/h)
- Lowest pressure: 996 mbar (hPa); 29.41 inHg

Overall effects
- Fatalities: 6 direct
- Damage: $1.1 million (2008 USD)
- Areas affected: Florida, Alabama, Mississippi, Louisiana, Texas, Oklahoma
- IBTrACS
- Part of the 2008 Atlantic hurricane season

Tropical Storm Edouard brought coastal and minor inland flooding to Louisiana and Texas in August 2008. The fifth tropical cyclone and fifth named storm of the hurricane season, Edouard developed from a trough in the northern Gulf of Mexico on August 3. After developing into a tropical depression, it gradually strengthened and was upgraded to Tropical Storm Edouard on August 4. However, northerly wind shear initially halted any further significant intensification and also caused the storm to struggle to maintain deep convection over the center. Edouard eventually intensified further and peaked as a strong tropical storm with winds of 65 mph (100 km/h) on August 5. Shortly thereafter, the storm made landfall near Gilchrist, Texas later that day. Edouard quickly weakened and was downgraded to tropical depression by early on August 6, six hours before degenerated into a remnant low pressure area.

Due to the relatively weak nature of the storm, impact was generally minor. Rip currents in Alabama and Florida led to five fatalities. The sixth death from the storm was also related to rough seas and occurred near the mouth of the Mississippi River in Louisiana. Storm surge and high tides also caused coastal flooding in the state, especially in Cameron Parish. Relatively strong winds left more than 2,000 without electricity and damaged trees and the roofs of mobile homes. Storm surge caused coastal flooding in eastern Texas, particularly in the Gilchrist area. At least 25 homes sustained damage, while portions of a few major roads, such as Interstate 10, were closed. Minor inland flooding occurred due to heavy rainfall, with a portion of Texas State Highway 36 being temporarily shutdown. Strong winds in the region damaged hundreds of homes, downed trees, and left about 300,000 people without electricity. Overall, damage from Tropical Storm Edouard totaled slightly more than $1.1 million (2008 USD).

== Meteorological history ==
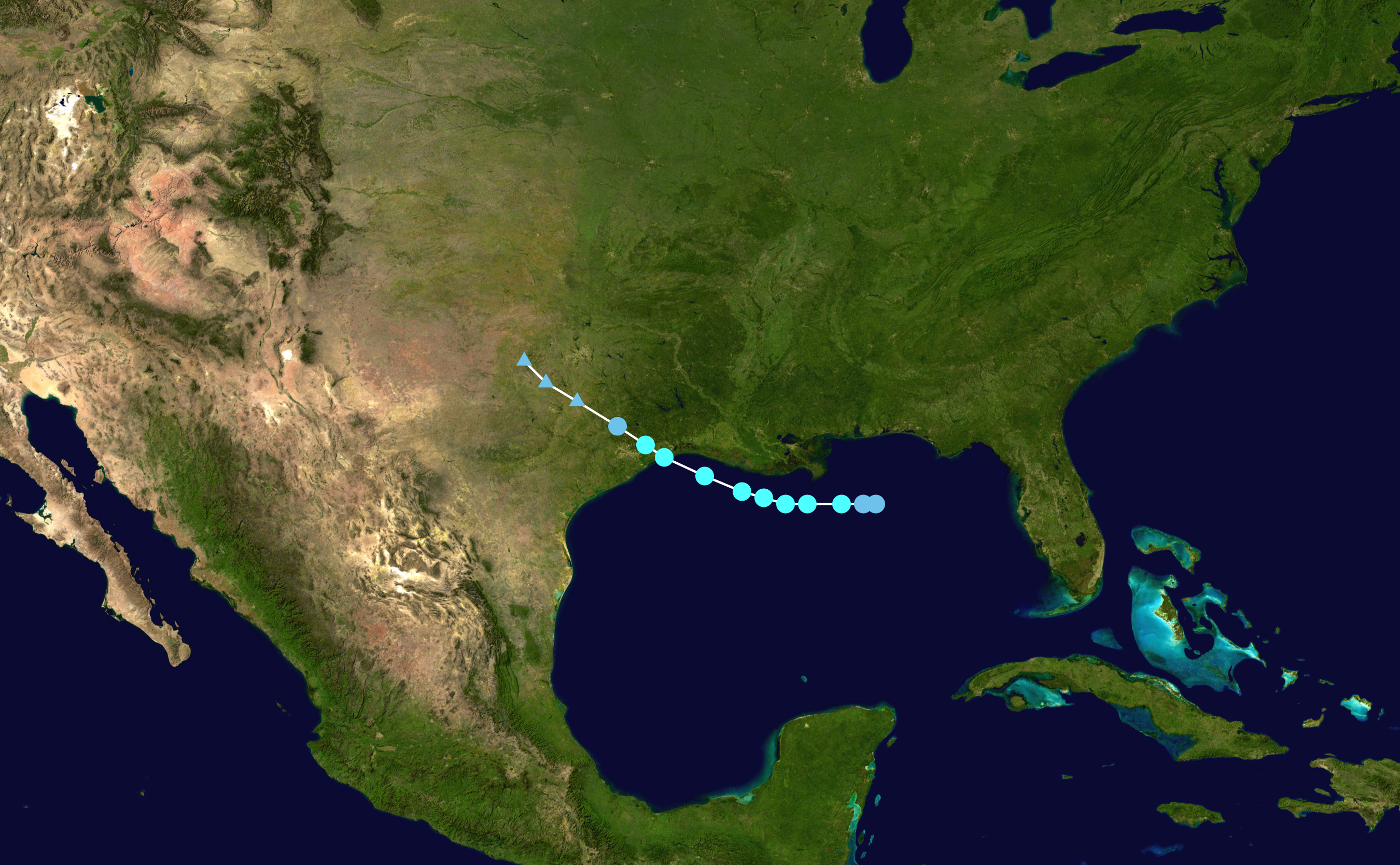
Map plotting the storm's track and intensity, according to the Saffir–Simpson scale Map key Saffir–Simpson scale Tropical depression (≤38 mph, ≤62 km/h) Tropical storm (39–73 mph, 63–118 km/h) Category 1 (74–95 mph, 119–153 km/h) Category 2 (96–110 mph, 154–177 km/h) Category 3 (111–129 mph, 178–208 km/h) Category 4 (130–156 mph, 209–251 km/h) Category 5 (≥157 mph, ≥252 km/h) Unknown Storm type Tropical cyclone Subtropical cyclone Extratropical cyclone, remnant low, tropical disturbance, or monsoon depression

On August 2, 2008, a trough entered the northern Gulf of Mexico, with a low pressure area developing near Apalachicola, Florida. The system maintained scattered deep convection across offshore waters and environmental conditions favored tropical cyclogenesis. The system tracked generally west-southwestward, due to its position south of a subtropical ridge extending from Texas through Florida. On the afternoon of August 3, a Hurricane Hunters flight into the system confirmed the development of a well-defined center of circulation, slightly exposed from a disorganized area of thunderstorms. As a result, the system developed into Tropical Depression Five at 1200 UTC on August 3, while located about 85 miles (140 km) south of the mouth of the Mississippi River. Because the depression was initially located in an area of northerly wind shear and dry air, the National Hurricane Center forecast it to slowly intensify.

After a burst in deep convection late on August 3, Hurricane Hunter data indicated flight level winds of 65 miles per hour (105 km/h). At 0000 UTC on August 4, the depression strengthened into Tropical Storm Edouard. Later that day, convection temporarily decreased around the center, though a brief convective flare up on its east side occurred early on August 5. Due to decreasing westerly wind shear, the center was nearly surrounded by convection that afternoon. Further organization continued and at 1200 UTC on August 5, Edouard attained its peak intensity with maximum sustained winds of 65 mph (100 km/h) and a minimum barometric pressure of 996 mbar (29.4 inHg). Simultaneously, the storm made landfall at the McFaddin and Texas Point National Wildlife Refuges near Gilchrist, Texas at the same intensity. It weakened rapidly after moving inland and was downgraded to a tropical depression late on August 5. Edouard then re-curved northwest over eastern Texas, before degenerating into a remnant low pressure area at 0600 UTC on August 6. The remnant low continued northwestward until dissipating over northern Texas early on August 7.

== Preparations ==
Several tropical cyclone warnings and watches were issued in association with Tropical Storm Edouard. At 2100 UTC on August 3, a tropical storm watch was posted from Intracoastal City, Louisiana to Port O'Connor, Texas. Simultaneously, a tropical storm warning was issued from Intracoastal City to the mouth of the Mississippi River in Louisiana. The tropical storm watch was upgraded to a hurricane watch early on August 4. Around that time, the tropical storm warning was extended from the mouth of the Mississippi River to Cameron, Louisiana. At 0900 UTC on August 4, the tropical storm warning was revised to reach San Luis Pass, Texas. The hurricane watch was modified from Grand Isle, Louisiana to Sargent, Texas. The tropical storm warning was extended to include the mouth of the Mississippi River to Port O'Connor at 1500 UTC on August 5. At that time, the tropical storm warning was modified again to stretch from San Luis Pass to Cameron. Late on August 5, all tropical cyclones were discontinued.

In the Gulf of Mexico, Shell Oil evacuated about 40 workers from drilling operations. BP and Chevron also evacuated workers from platforms in the western and central Gulf, though neither predicted substantial effects on production. A few oil refineries on land were closed, such as one operated by Marathon Oil in Texas City, Texas. Governor of Texas Rick Perry issued a disaster declaration for 17 Texas counties that were threatened by Tropical Storm Edouard. Perry activated up to 1,200 National Guard troops, a 70 member rescue team, six helicopters, and an incident management team that brings food and water to affected areas. Under the order, about 200 buses became available in San Antonio and Houston to help in evacuations. Dow Chemical shut down their plants in Clear Lake and La Porte. The United States Coast Guard also ceased cargo operations to the Galveston-Houston area by late on August 4. Governor of Louisiana Bobby Jindal declared a statewide emergency. In Cameron Parish, Louisiana the Office of Emergency Preparedness ordered a mandatory evacuation, where Sheriff's deputies also erected roadblocks.

== Impact ==
=== Florida, Alabama, and Louisiana ===
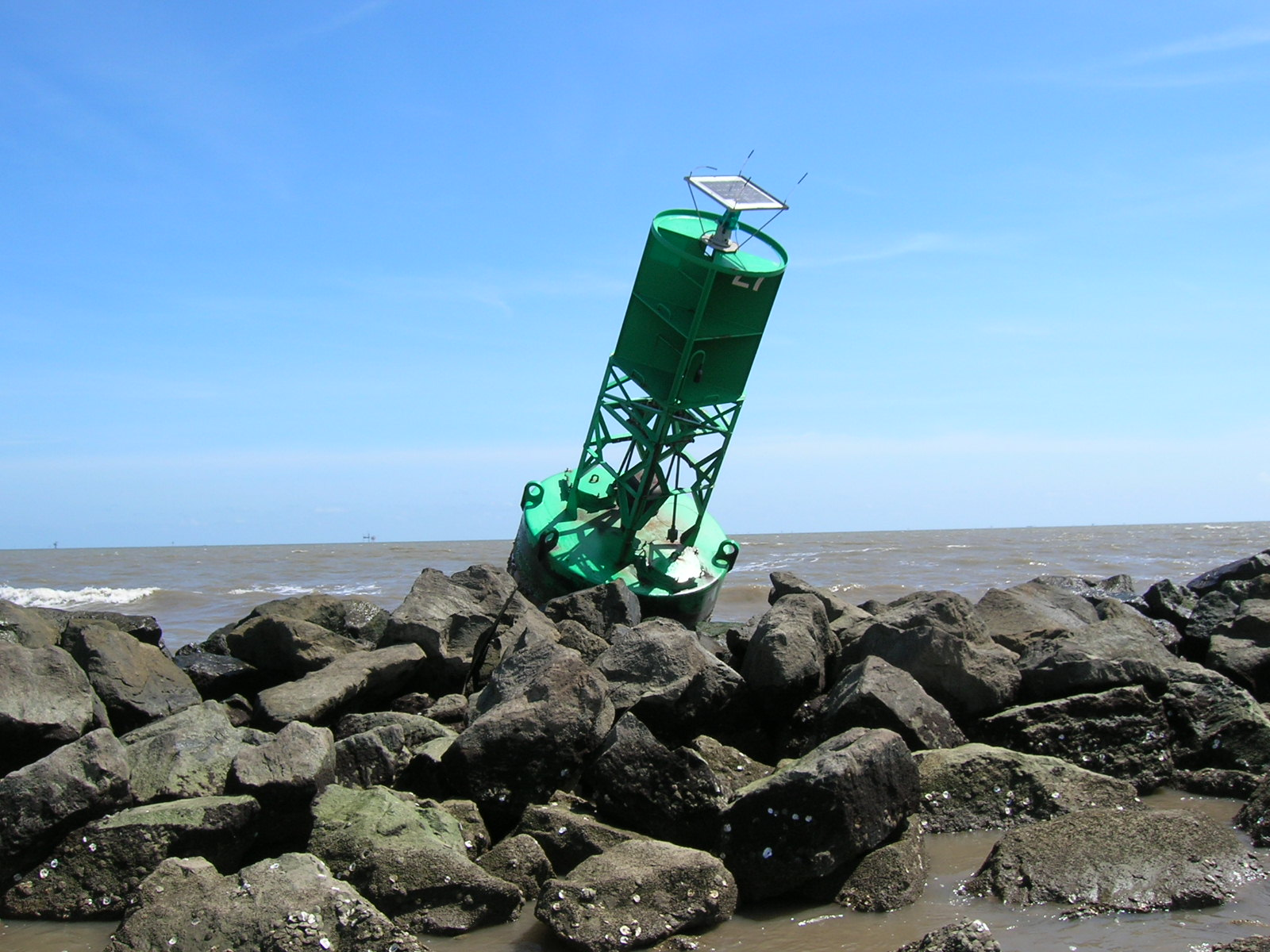
Navigational buoy snapped loose and beached near Holly Beach, LA.

Rip currents in Florida and Alabama led to the deaths of five people, three of which occurred in Panama City, Florida. Along the coast, storm surge in Louisiana generally ran 4 to 5 feet (1.2 to 1.5 m) above normal, although a slightly higher tide was reported near Intracoastal City. Due to the storm surge, part of Louisiana Highway 82 was closed between Holly Beach and Johnson Bayou. Additionally, Interstate 10 was also flooded by storm surge. Minor flooding from the surge traveled up the Calcasieu River to Lake Charles, where water flooded a local yacht club. Low-lying areas of Intracoastal City were flooded, disrupting marine industries. A man fell overboard from a shrimp boat and died in rough seas from Edouard near the mouth of the Mississippi River. This was the only death directly associated with Tropical Storm Edouard.

Three locations reported tropical storm force winds, including 46 mph (74 km/h) on Timbalier Island, 54 mph (87 km/h) in Calcasieu Pass, and 48 mph (77 km/h) on Marsh Island. In Cameron, Vermilion, and Calcasieu Parishes, wind gusts were mainly between 40 and 60 mph (64 and 97 km/h), though a gust of 62 mph (100 km/h) was observed at Calcasieu Pass. Winds severely damaged several mobile homes in Cameron, mostly from roofs being torn off. More than 3,000 people were left without electricity in Cameron Calcasieu Parishes combined as winds downed trees and power lines. A few mobile homes in that parish sustained minor wind damage. In Vermilion Parish, a few trees and power lines were downed. Rainfall in Louisiana reached 3.81 inches (97 mm) at Hackberry; at other locations, precipitation was mainly between 1 and 3 inches (25 and 76 mm). Overall, Edouard caused about $350,000 in damage within the state of Louisiana.

=== Texas ===
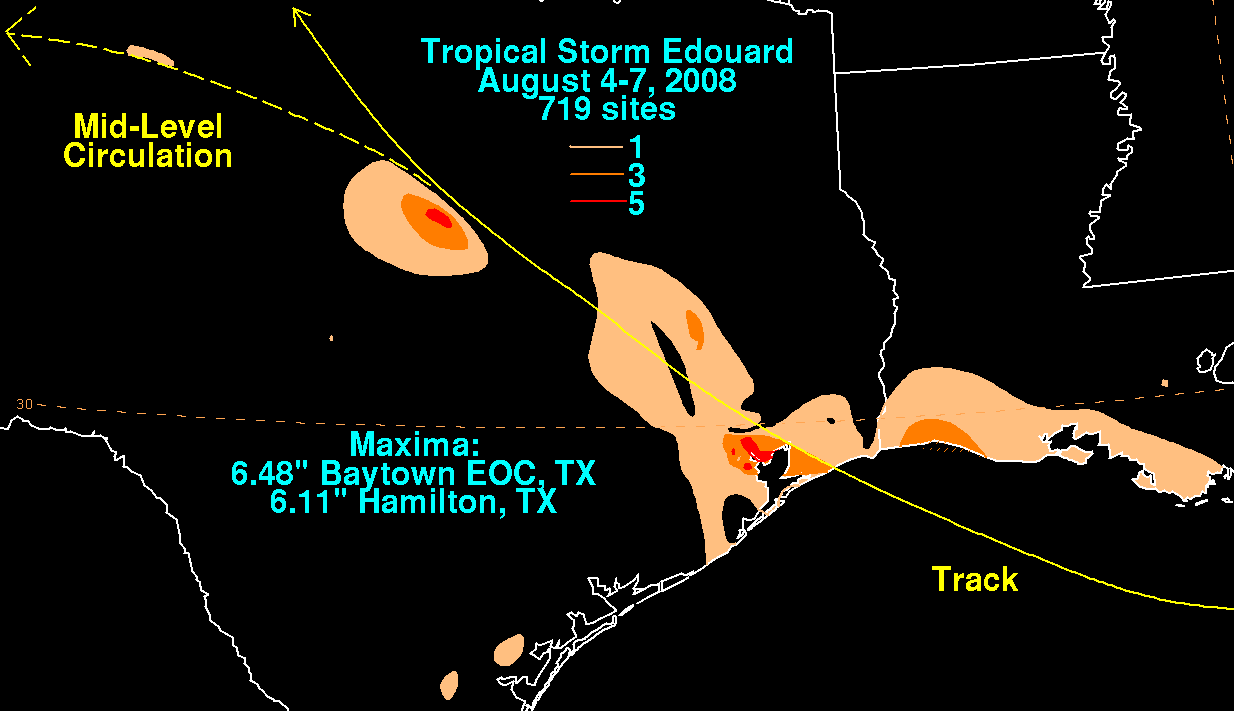
Edouard's storm total rainfall

Rainfall from Edouard peaked at 6.48 inches (165 mm) at Baytown, Texas, near Houston. In central Texas, a burst of thunderstorm activity near the storm's center produced 6.11 inches (155 mm) of rain near Hamilton, Texas; as a result, part of Texas State Highway 36 was closed due to flooding. Elsewhere, 3 to 5 inches (76 to 127 mm) of precipitation was reported. The heavy rainfall was expected to help relieve persistent drought conditions in some locations. Winds gusted to over 50 mph (80 km/h), peaking at over 70 mph (110 km/h). Furthermore, a wind gust of 71 mph (114 km/h) was reported at Texas Point. Due to the high winds, falling trees and power lines left at least 300,000 customers in Southeastern Texas without electricity, most of them in Jefferson County. Hundreds of homes also suffered damage.

Storm surge ranged between 2 and 5 feet (0.60–1.5 m) along the coast. In addition, high surf battered the shore. Minor storm surge flooding along portions of the Bolivar Peninsula caused $95,000 in damage. The coastal flooding forced the closure of and caused $5,000 in damage to Interstate 10 in Chambers County. Near Baytown, water flooded a few garages. Additionally, at least 27 homes in Gilchrist flooded. Two mobile homes and fifteen single-family homes had 6 inches (150 mm) of water; as much as 18 inches (460 mm) of water was reported in ten other single-family houses. At the McFaddin and Texas Point National Wildlife Refuges, losses in the park totaled to $100,000. Overall, effects from Tropical Storm Edouard in the state of Texas resulted in approximately $450,000 in damage.

=== Other States ===
Remnant moisture from Edouard generated severe thunderstorms over New Mexico. Several roads and buildings were flooded. One person was rescued. Damage statewide totaled to US$300,000.

== See also ==
- List of Texas hurricanes
- Other storms of the same name
- Hurricane Barry (2019) - took a similar path
