= Hurricane Edouard (1996) =

Category 4 Atlantic hurricane in 1996

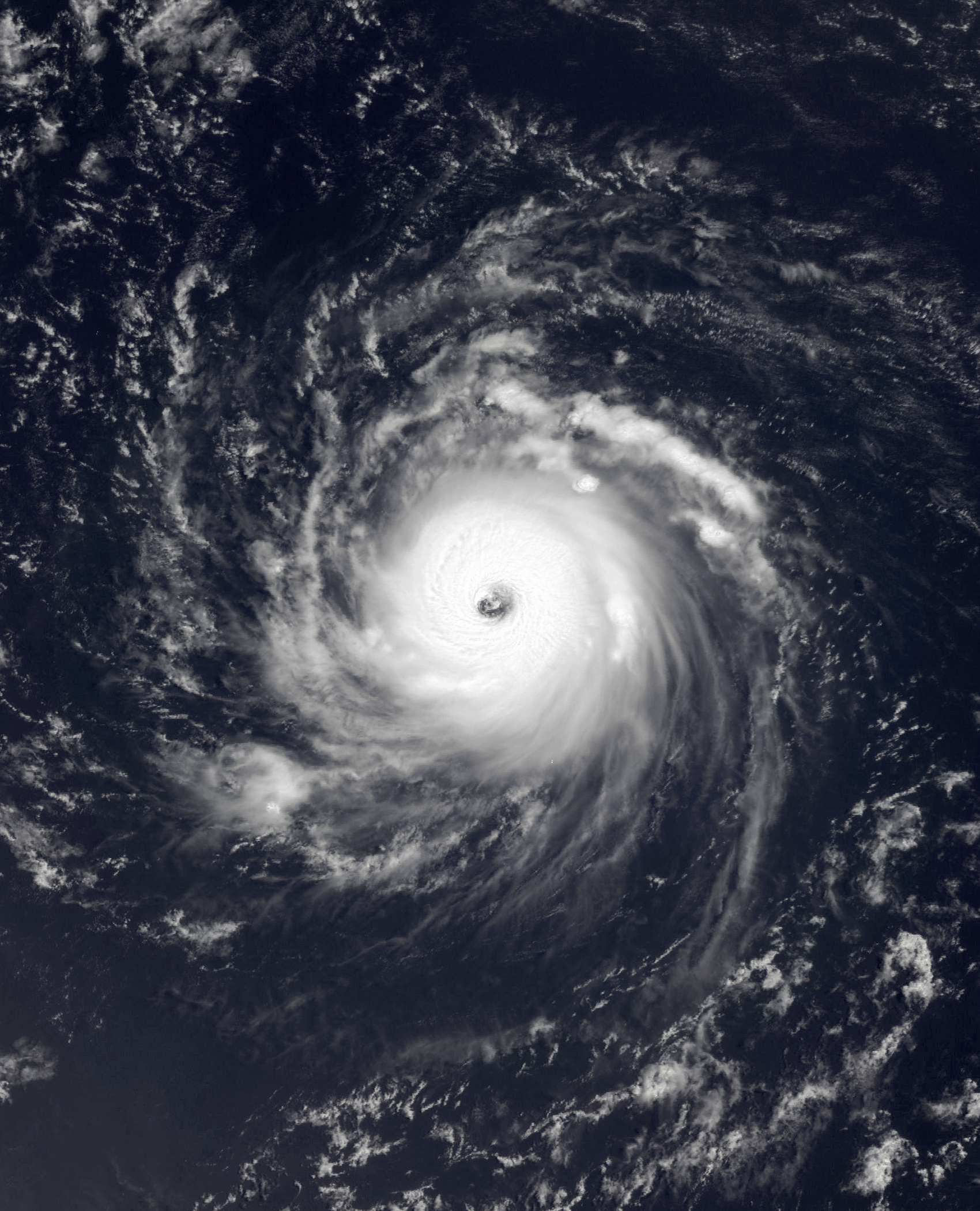
- Edouard at peak intensity on August 25

Meteorological history
- Formed: August 19, 1996
- Extratropical: September 3, 1996
- Dissipated: September 7, 1996

Category 4 major hurricane
- 1-minute sustained (SSHWS/NWS)
- Highest winds: 145 mph (230 km/h)
- Lowest pressure: 933 mbar (hPa); 27.55 inHg

Overall effects
- Fatalities: 2 direct
- Damage: $20 million (1996 USD)
- Areas affected: East Coast of the United States, Atlantic Canada
- IBTrACS
- Part of the 1996 Atlantic hurricane season

Hurricane Edouard was the strongest tropical cyclone of the 1996 Atlantic hurricane season, reaching winds of 145 mph (233 km/h) on its path. Edouard remained a major hurricane for eight days, an unusually long amount of time. A Cape Verde hurricane, the storm formed near the coast of Africa in the middle of August. It moved westward then curved northward, and persisted until early September when it became extratropical to the southeast of New England. Edouard was originally forecast to strike the northeast United States, but it produced hurricane-force gusts to portions of southeastern Massachusetts while remaining offshore. The winds caused minor damage totaling $20 million. In addition, the hurricane generated strong waves and rip currents to coastlines, killing two people in Ocean City, New Jersey and causing numerous injuries.

== Meteorological history ==
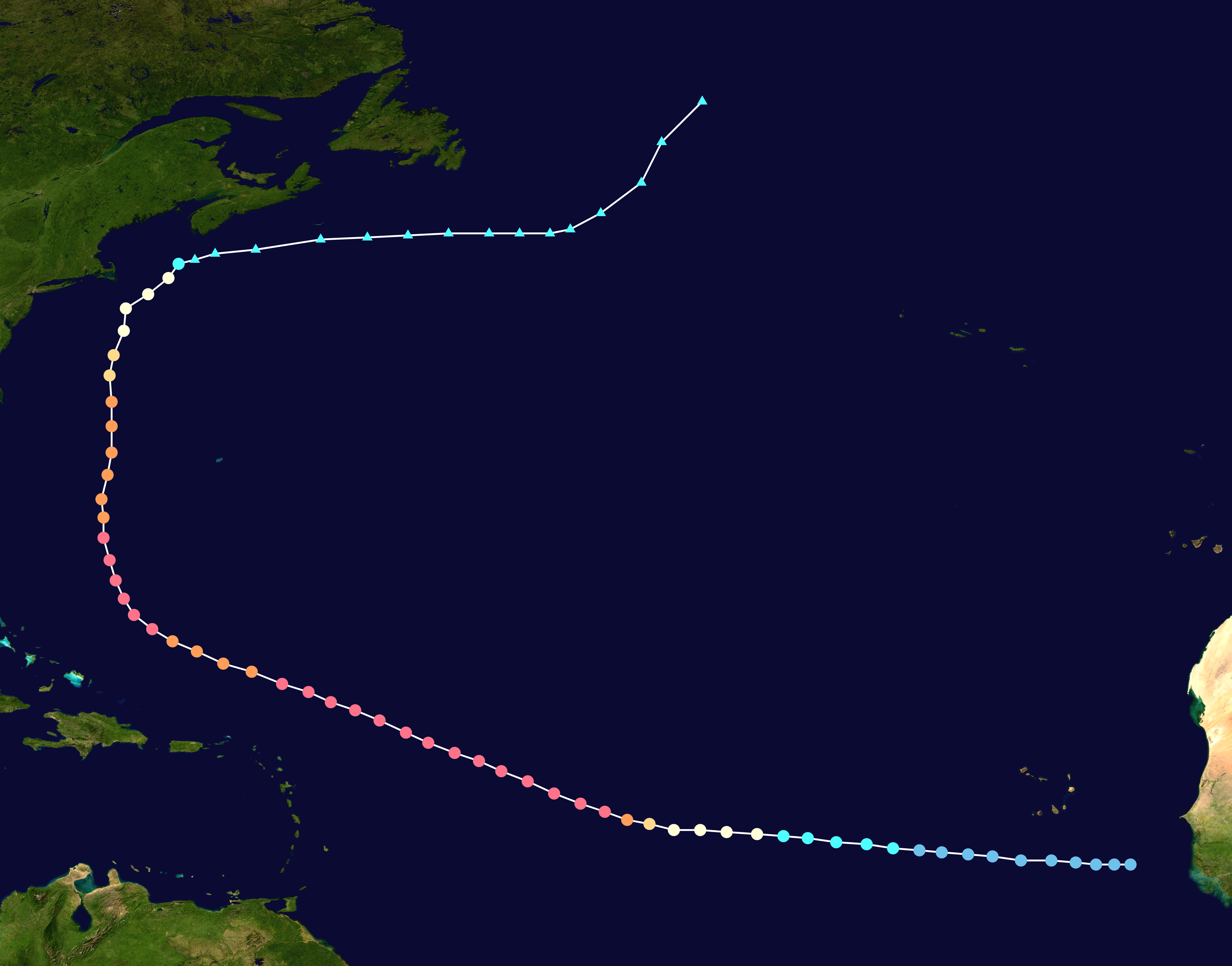
Map plotting the storm's track and intensity, according to the Saffir–Simpson scale Map key Saffir–Simpson scale Tropical depression (≤38 mph, ≤62 km/h) Tropical storm (39–73 mph, 63–118 km/h) Category 1 (74–95 mph, 119–153 km/h) Category 2 (96–110 mph, 154–177 km/h) Category 3 (111–129 mph, 178–208 km/h) Category 4 (130–156 mph, 209–251 km/h) Category 5 (≥157 mph, ≥252 km/h) Unknown Storm type Tropical cyclone Subtropical cyclone Extratropical cyclone, remnant low, tropical disturbance, or monsoon depression

A tropical wave moved off the coast of Africa on August 19, accompanied with spiral bands of convection around an area of low pressure. A large circulation quickly developed once it reached the Atlantic Ocean, and the system organized into Tropical Depression Four late on August 19 while located 345 mi (555 km) southeast of Cape Verde. Initial forecasts predicted for great intensification, including one forecast for the depression to strengthen to a hurricane within three days. However, the depression remained disorganized, and slowly intensified to attain tropical storm status on August 22.

After becoming a tropical storm, Edouard quickly strengthened due to the establishment of an upper-level anticyclone over the storm. The storm moved to the west in response to a strong subtropical ridge to its north, and Edouard strengthened into a hurricane on August 23. Due to very favorable conditions, the hurricane rapidly strengthened on August 24 and August 25 to peak as a 145 mph (233 km/h) Category 4 hurricane on the Saffir-Simpson Scale. A weakness in the subtropical ridge allowed for a motion more to the west-northwest, and the hurricane passed about 250 mi (400 km) north of the Lesser Antilles on August 28. For three days during this time, Edouard maintained Category 4 intensity, though weakened late on August 28 due to an eyewall replacement cycle and vertical shear.

Late on August 29, Hurricane Edouard developed three concentric eyewalls, an unusual occurrence coinciding with an increase in strength to 140 mph (230 km/h). A mid-tropospheric trough turned the hurricane to the north to an area of unfavorable conditions, and Edouard weakened to a Category 3 hurricanes on August 31. On September 1, the hurricane passed about midway between Bermuda and Cape Hatteras, and turned to the north-northeast. Edouard continued to weaken as it turned to the northeast, and on September 2 passed about 95 mi (153 km) to the southeast of Nantucket, Massachusetts as an 80 mph (130 km/h) hurricane, its closest point of approach to the United States. Edouard weakened to tropical storm status on September 3, and became extratropical shortly thereafter while located to the south of Nova Scotia. As an extratropical storm, Edouard turned to the east, then moved around the periphery of a larger extratropical storm until becoming absorbed by the storm early on September 7.

== Preparations ==
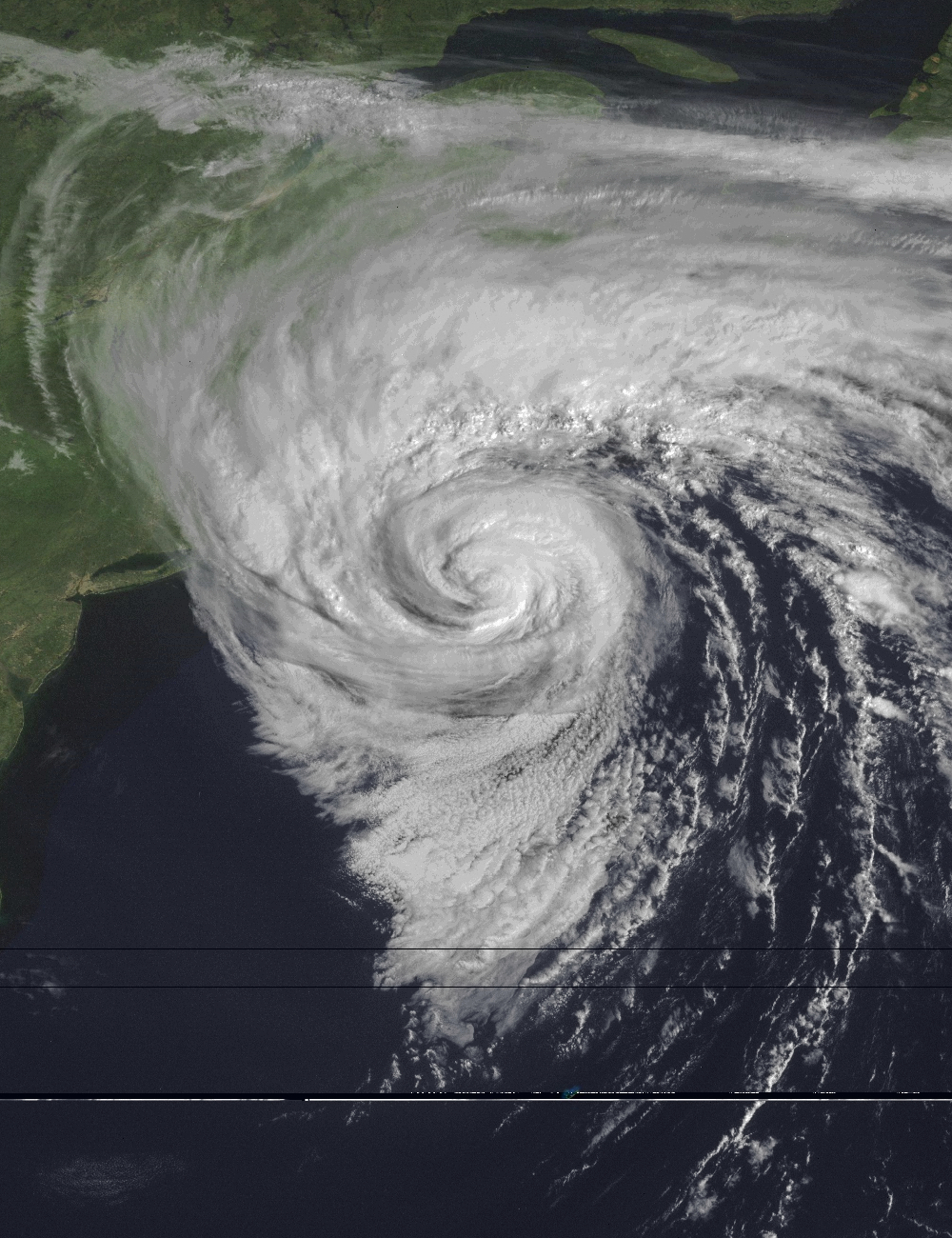
Hurricane Edouard near New England on September 2

A high pressure system over New England resulted in the possibility that Edouard would track to the west and strike the United States. One computer model predicted the hurricane would strike near Atlantic City, New Jersey with winds of over 111 mph (179 km/h) on Labor Day. This caused Cape May County officials to contemplate ordering an evacuation for the busiest tourist weekend of the year, though an evacuation never occurred. Due to the possibility for a landfall on the East Coast of the United States, officials at the National Hurricane Center issued Tropical Storm and Hurricane Watches and Warnings from Cape Lookout, North Carolina to Eastport, Maine at various times. Tropical storm warnings existed from North Carolina to Watch Hill, Rhode Island and from the mouth of the Merrimack River to the United States/Canada border, while hurricane warnings existed from Watch Hill, Rhode Island to Merrimack River, Massachusetts. Hurricane watches were also issued for the tropical storm warning area.

In North Carolina, Cape Lookout was closed and evacuated prior to the storm's passage. Because a Hurricane Watch existed for the New York City metropolitan area, New York Mayor Rudy Giuliani urged citizens to take preparations. In addition, city officials set up a hurricane helpline, activated the city's Emergency Command Center at the Police Headquarters, and distributed leaflets to flood-prone areas. Near New Bedford, Massachusetts, where landfall was predicted to occur, schools were prepared as shelters in case of a direct hit. New Bedford Mayor issued a state of emergency for the city. However, few people stayed in shelters during the storm's passage. On Cape Cod, thousands of tourists and summer residents evacuated in preparation for the storm, resulting in an 18-mile (29 km) traffic backup. As a result, many beach resorts lost millions in potential revenue. Of those who remained on Cape Cod, 900 stayed in emergency shelters when the storm passed the area. In Boston's Logan International Airport, numerous flights were cancelled or delayed to move planes to safety. Many sailors removed their boats from the water prior to the storm. At one time in Mattapoisett Harbor, workers removed boats at a rate of one every eight minutes. In Maine, the Red Cross opened several emergency shelters, though they were never used. Like in Massachusetts, sailors removed their boats, and due to media coverage, residents were well-prepared for the hurricane.

== Impact ==
Despite initial predictions, Edouard's effects were much less than expected. Strong waves struck much of the East Coast of the United States, killing 2 and injuring numerous others. In 2011 the National Hurricane Center reported that Edouard had caused a total of US$20 million with the greatest damage occurring on Cape Cod, where moderate wind gusts resulted in $4.6 million (2007 USD).

=== Carolinas and Mid-Atlantic ===
In South Carolina, minor beach erosion was reported in Charleston and Colleton Counties. Swells of up to 15 ft (4.6 m), in combination with strong waves, caused overwash on Route 12 on Hatteras Island. Minor beach erosion occurred. Moderate winds of up to 50 mph (80 km/h) blew down a few trees and caused shingle damage to buildings. In Delaware, rough surf closed numerous coastal beaches, while storm tides and waves flooded a campground near the Indian River in Sussex County. Strong waves in New Jersey killed two people and seriously injured another. Lifeguards made numerous rescues along the coast, while other beaches were closed or had restrictions on bathing. Winds were minor along the Jersey coastline, peaking at less than 30 mph (48 km/h).

In New York, Edouard produced strong waves and storm tides of one to two ft (0.3 to 0.6 m), causing overwash along southern Long Island due to high tide. Coastal flooding occurred, including in Hampton Bays where the waves flooded one road and covered another with sand. The flooding trapped six cars, while the strong waves forced several beaches to close. Because the hurricane moved through the New York Shipping Channel, numerous ships reported winds of over hurricane status, though winds remained below tropical storm force on land. A boat capsized off the coast of Jones Beach Island, though its passengers were not injured. A Celebrity Cruises cruise ship, the MV Zenith suffered damage from 30 to 50 ft (nine to 15 m) waves, injuring several passengers and crew members. Rainfall was minimal, peaking at less than a half of an inch in eastern Long Island.

=== New England and Canada ===
Hurricane Edouard passed about 95 miles (153 km)/h) southeast of Nantucket while moving at only 12 mph (19 km/h), much slower than previous New England hurricanes. This resulted in several hours of strong waves, winds, and rain. The hurricane produced wave heights of up to 31 feet (9.4 m), which washed twelve boats ashore and damaged numerous others. The strong waves and a storm surge of up to 2.1 feet (0.64 m) in Nantucket flooded a few coastal roads. Edouard also produced tropical storm force winds across much of Massachusetts, as well as one hurricane-force gust on Nantucket. In addition, there were unofficial reports of stronger gusts, including 77 mph (124 km/h) on Cape Cod, 80 mph (130 km/h) on Martha's Vineyard, and 90 mph (140 km/h) on Nantucket. The strong winds caused power outages to 2/3 of Nantucket, all of Martha's Vineyard for six hours, and most of Cape Cod for several hours. Power outages, effecting 35,000 to 40,000 were reported throughout Massachusetts, though far from the power outages caused by Hurricane Bob five years prior. The winds also downed numerous trees, and blew off the roof of the fire station in Hyannis. Rainfall was moderate from the slow-moving hurricane, peaking at 6.37 inches (162 mm) in West Dennis with many other locations reporting over 3 inches (76 mm). The rainfall produced minor street flooding. Damage on Cape Cod totaled to $3.5 million (1996 USD, $4.6 million 2007 USD).

In New Hampshire, the hurricane produced winds gusts of up to 38 mph (61 km/h) and around 1 inch (25 mm) of rain along the coast. In Maine, heavy surf closed several beaches and injured two people. Waves also damaged several boats. Winds were moderate near the coast, peaking at 47 mph (76 km/h) with gusts to 54 mph (87 km/h) at Mount Desert Island. The winds knocked over several trees and caused sporadic power outages throughout the state, including loss of power for 1,900 Portland residents. In Kittery, water fell through an office building, damaging computer equipment. Rainfall was minor, peaking at 1.23 inches (31 mm) in Eastport.

In southern Nova Scotia, Edouard produced heavy rainfall from 3.7 to 5.5 inches (94 to 140 mm). Winds were moderate, peaking at 75 mph (121 km/h) in Cape Breton Highlands. The hurricane also caused beach erosion on southeastern Nova Scotia.

== See also ==
- Other storms of the same name
- List of Category 4 Atlantic hurricanes
- Hurricane Bill (2009)
- Hurricane Earl (2010)
- Hurricane Katia (2011)
- Hurricane Jose (2017)
- Hurricane Lee (2023)
- Hurricane Erin (2025)
